= Lycée Valentine Labbé =

Senior high school in Nord, France

Coordinates: 50.6476°N 3.0732°E

Lycée Valentine Labbé is a senior high school/sixth-form college in La Madeleine, Nord, France, in the Lille Metropole.

It is two tram stations away from Gare Lille Flandres.

The school has a boarding facility.
