= Peace Palace =

International law administrative building in The Hague, Netherlands

- Dutch: Vredespaleis
- The Peace Palace, headquarters of the Permanent Court of Arbitration and the International Court of Justice

General information
- Type: International courthouse
- Architectural style: Neo-Renaissance
- Location: The Hague, Netherlands
- Coordinates: 52.0866°N 4.2955°E
- Current tenants: International Court of Justice and Permanent Court of Arbitration
- Groundbreaking: 1907; 119 years ago
- Opened: 28 August 1913; 113 years ago
- Cost: US$1.5 million ($50,000,000, adjusted for inflation)
- Affiliation: United Nations

Design and construction
- Architect: Louis M. Cordonnier
- Architecture firm: J.A.G. van der Steur
- Awards: European Heritage Label

The Peace Palace (Dutch: Vredespaleis [ˈvreːdəspaːˌlɛis]; French: Palais de la Paix) is an international courthouse in The Hague, Netherlands. It houses the International Court of Justice (which is the principal judicial body of the United Nations), and the Permanent Court of Arbitration (PCA).

The palace officially opened on 28 August 1913; it was built to provide a courthouse for the PCA, a court created to end war by the Hague Convention of 1899. In addition to its function as the headquarters of the PCA since 1913 and of the International Court of Justice since 1946, the palace continues to serve as the Courts' main hearing facilities and hosts dozens of hearings each year.

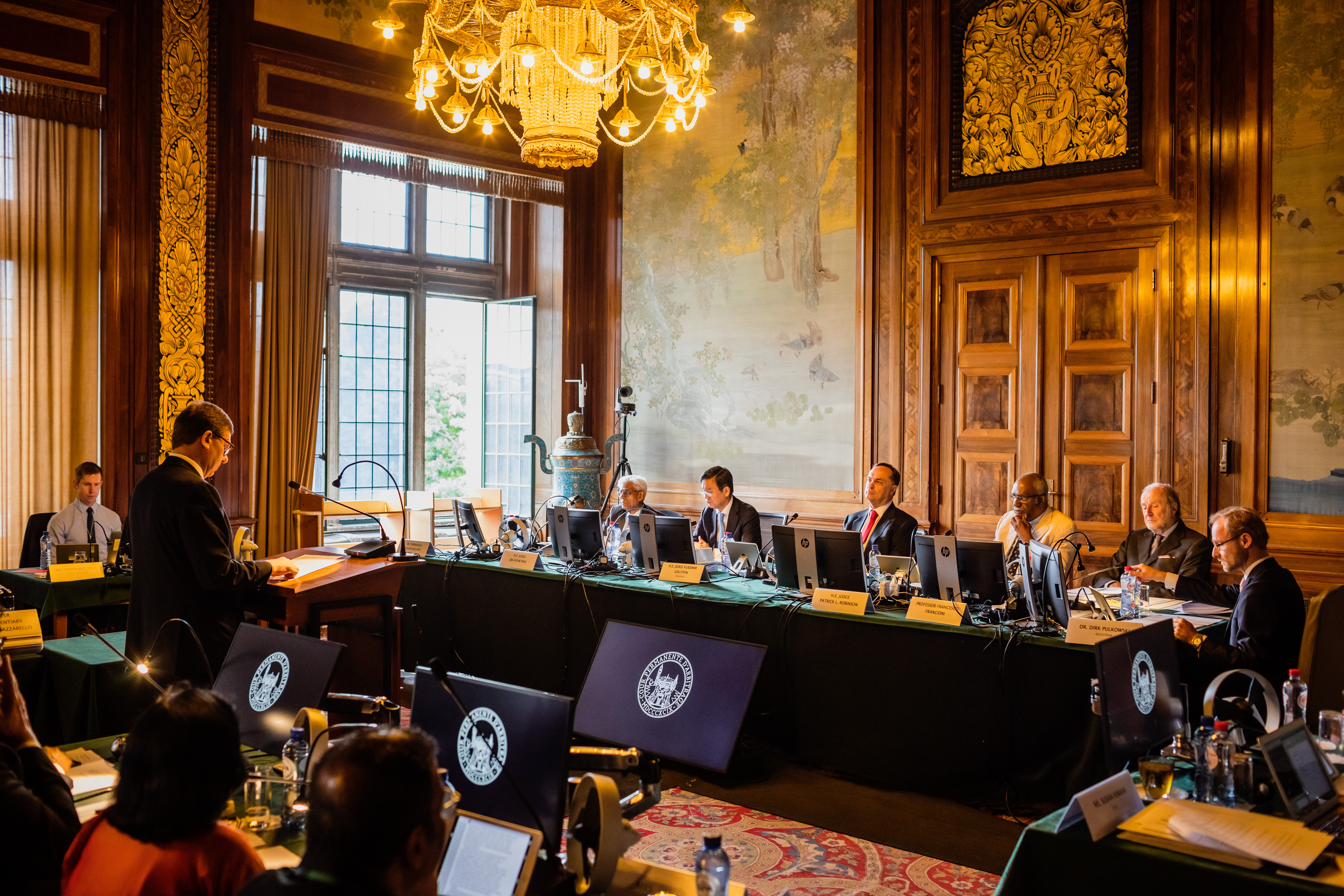
Hearing in the PCA Administrative Council Chamber at the Peace Palace

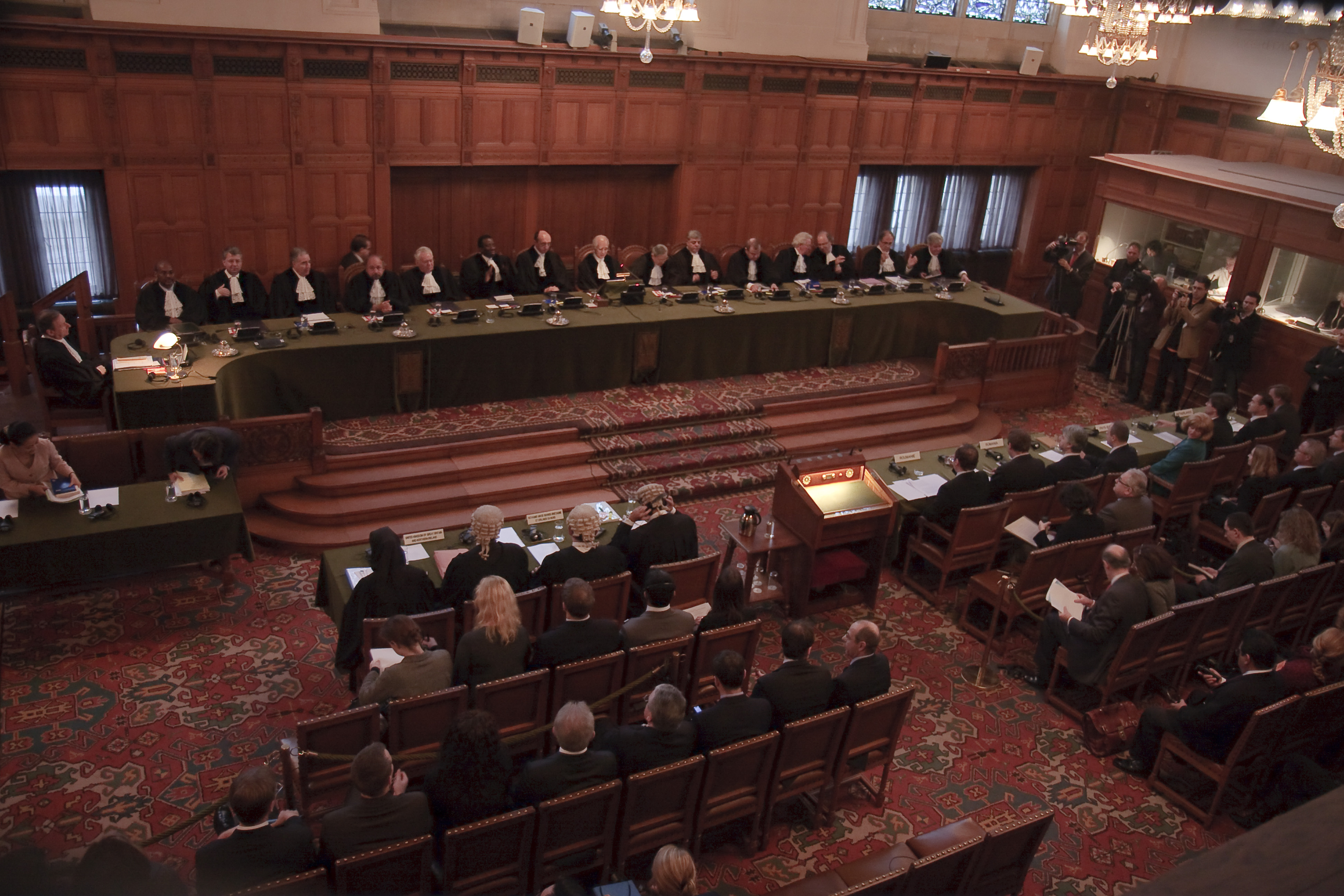
ICJ Hearing

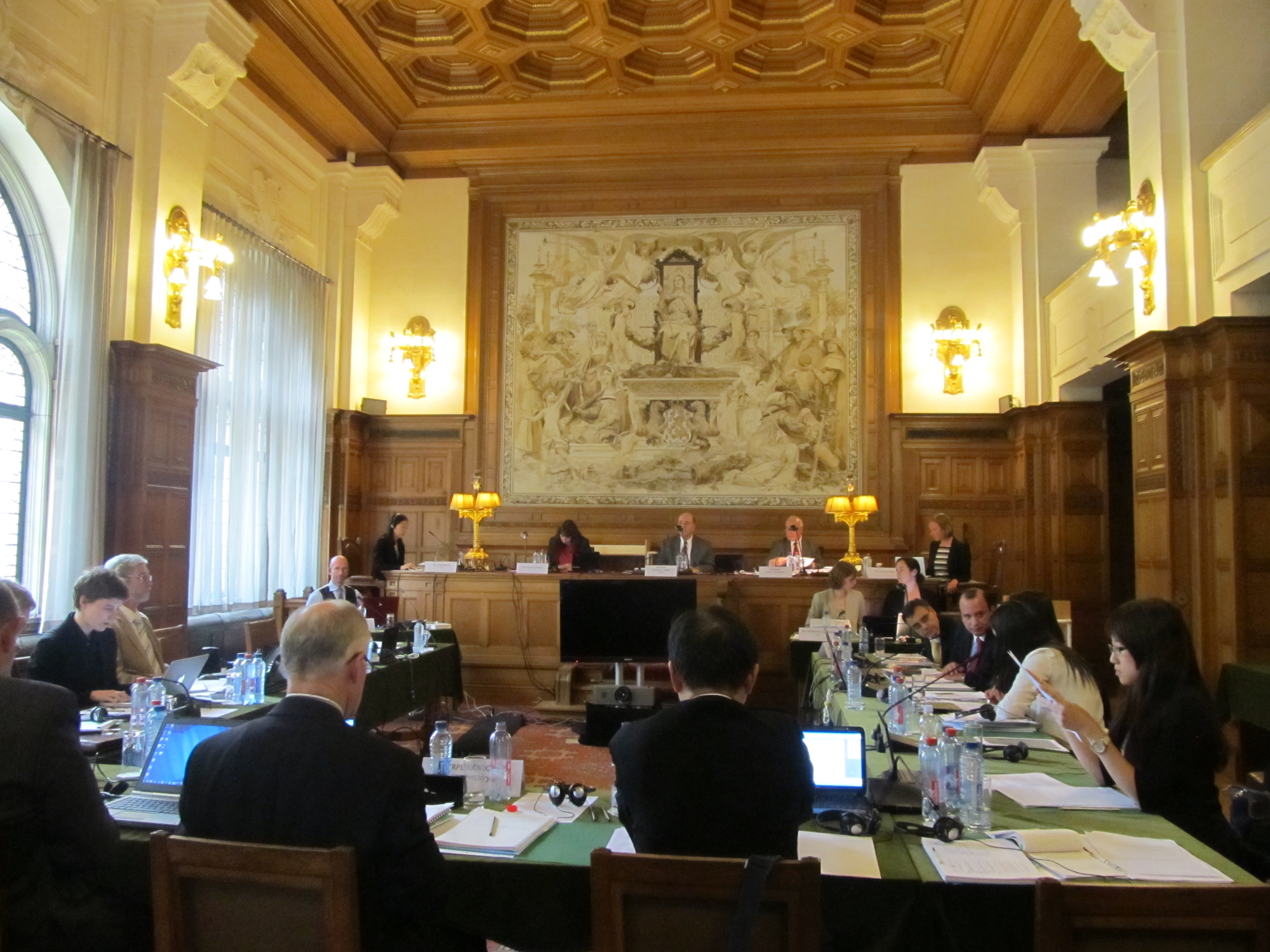
Meeting in the Small Hall of Justice of the PCA (PCA Case 2013-14)

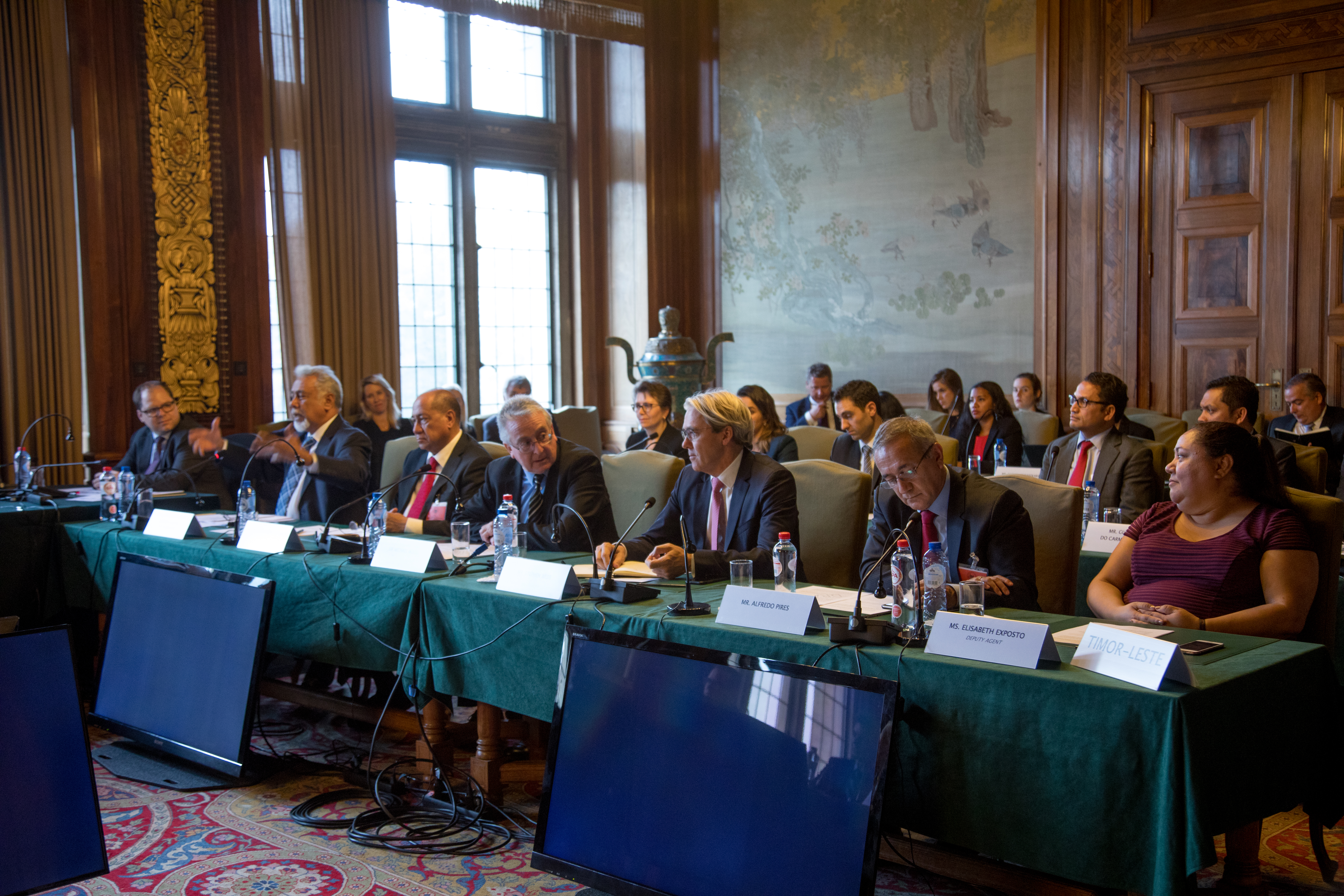
Hearing at the Peace Palace (Timor-Leste v. Australia)

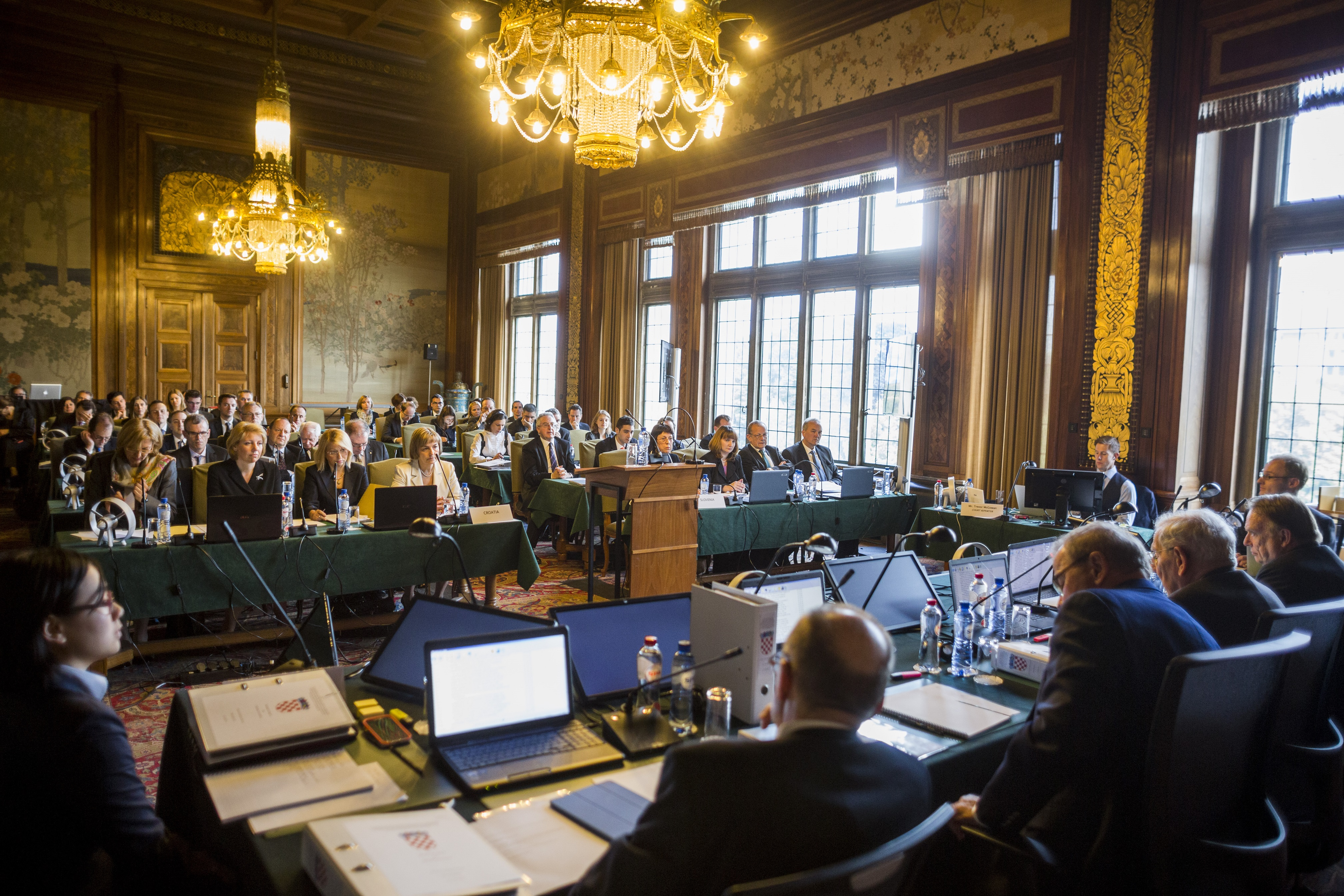
Hearing in PCA Case 2012-04 (Croatia v. Slovenia)

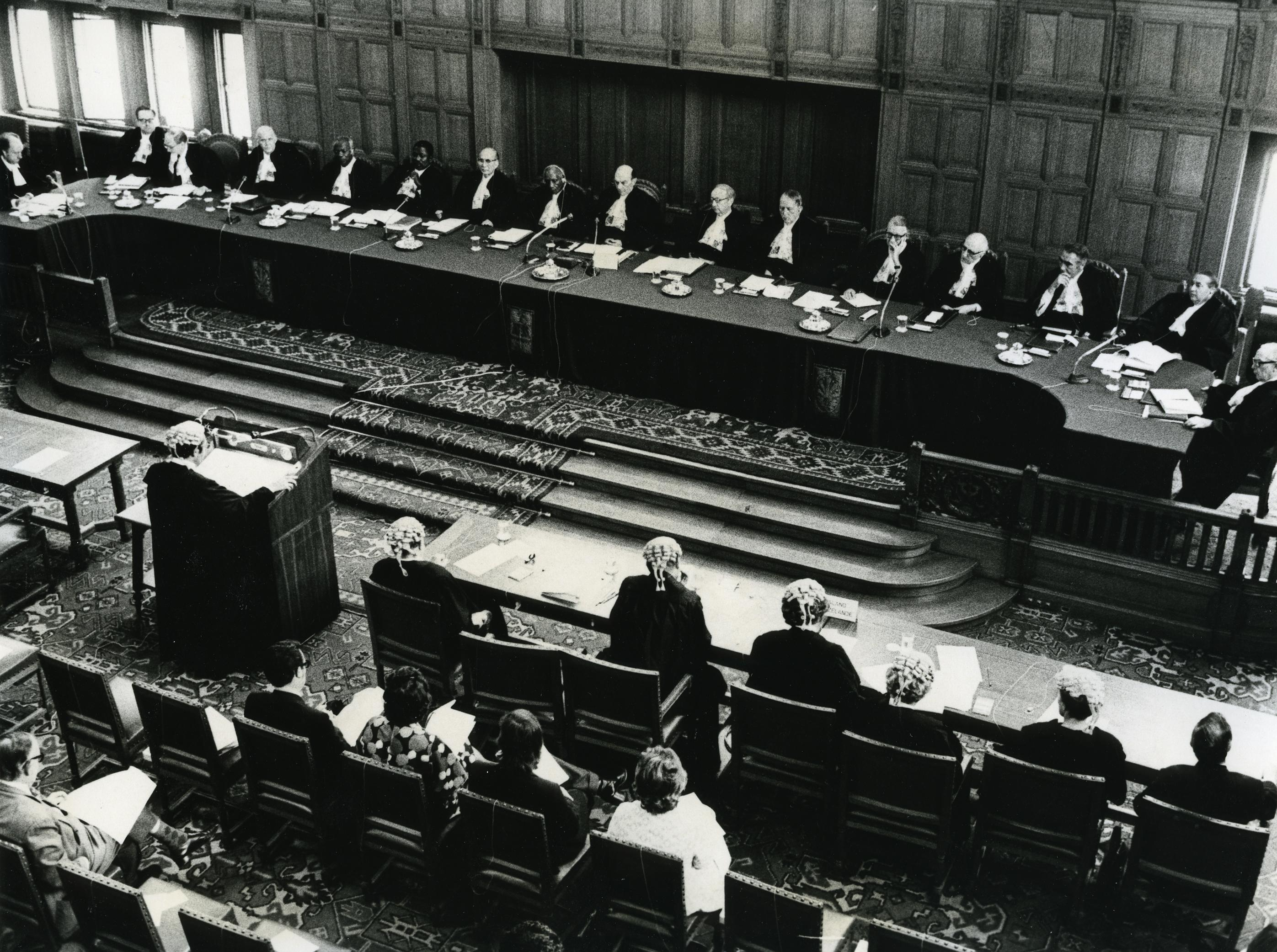
Hearing of the International Court of Justice at the Peace Palace

== History ==
=== Background ===
In the late 1800s, States were in the midst of an arms race. Faced with economic challenges caused by the military build-up, as well as the risk of a large-scale armed conflict, Russian Czar Nicholas II proposed a conference to develop peaceful mechanisms of settling international disputes. In 1899, delegates from 26 States, including a number of countries in Europe, the Ottoman Empire, the United States, Mexico, China, Japan, the then-Kingdom of Siam, and Persia came to Huis Ten Bosch in The Hague for what has come to be known as the First Hague Peace Conference.

The crowning achievement of the Conference was the 1899 Convention for the Pacific Settlement of International Disputes. The Convention recognized arbitration as “the most effective, and at the same time the most equitable means of settling disputes which diplomacy has failed to settle.” To that end, the Convention established the Permanent Court of Arbitration (PCA), to be “accessible to all” and “accessible at all times”. The PCA was the first permanent intergovernmental organization to provide a forum for the resolution of international disputes through arbitration and other peaceful means.

Following the creation of the PCA in 1899, its Founding States decided to build a dedicated courthouse to support the Court's mission and encourage States to resolve their disputes peacefully: the Peace Palace.

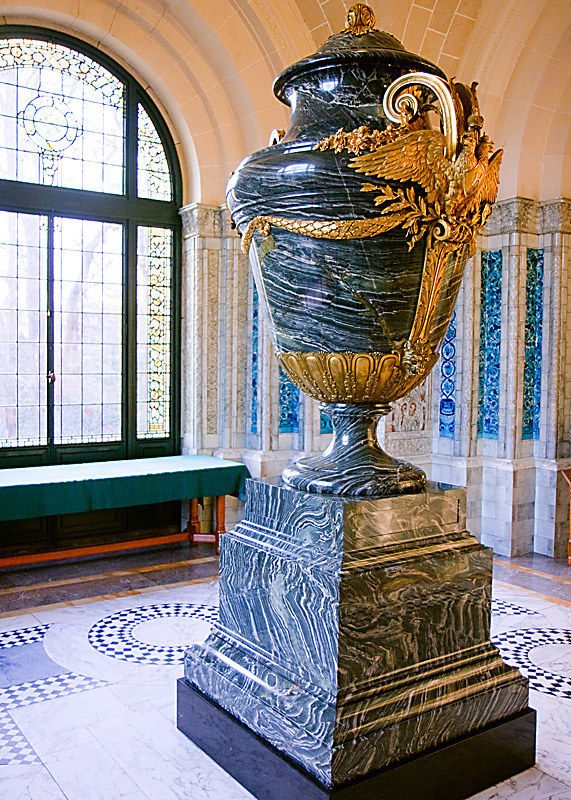
Vase given by Russia

The idea of the palace started from a discussion in 1900 between the Russian diplomat Friedrich Martens and American diplomat White over providing a home for the PCA. Andrew Dickson White, whose efforts were instrumental in creating the court, secured US$1.5 million ($50,000,000, adjusted for inflation) from Scottish-American steel magnate Andrew Carnegie to build the Peace Palace to house the court as well as to endow it with a library of international law. White described his idea to Carnegie:

"A temple of peace where the doors are open, in contrast to the Janus-temple, in times of peace and closed in cases of war [...] as a worthy testimony of the people that, after many long centuries finally a court that has thrown open its doors for the peaceful settlement of differences between peoples".

Were such a fabric to be created, men would make pilgrimages from all parts of the civilized world to see it. It would become a sort of holy place, prized and revered by thinking men throughout the world, and to which, in any danger of war between any two countries, the minds of men would turn naturally and normally. The main difficulty now is that the people of the various nations do not really know what was done for them by the Conference; but such a building would make them know it. It would be an "outward and visible sign" of the Court, which would make its actual, tangible existence known to the ends of the earth"

—Andrew Dickson White to Andrew Carnegie, 5 August 1902

=== Architectural competition ===
In September 1903, the Minister of Foreign Affairs of the Netherlands established an Advisory and Preparatory Commission to launch an open competition for the design of the courthouse. The Commission drafted a program of requirements for the architectural competition and visited prominent courthouses to determine the building's needs.

At first Carnegie simply wanted to donate the money directly to the Dutch Queen Wilhelmina of the Netherlands for the building of the palace, but legal problems prohibited this, and in November 1903 the Carnegie Foundation in the Netherlands was founded to manage the construction and maintenance of the palace for the Permanent Court of Arbitration.

In 1904, the newly created Foundation assumed responsibility for the competition and issued the call for proposals in 1905, which led to the selection of French architect Louis M. Cordonnier's design, set in the Neo-Renaissance style, from among 216 entries.

To build within budget, Cordonnier and his Dutch associate J.A.G. van der Steur adjusted the design. The palace initially had two big bell towers in front and two small ones in the back. Only one big tower and one small tower remained in the final building.

In 1908, Thomas Hayton Mawson won a competition to design the grounds. Because of budget constraints, he also had to discard design elements: mountains and sculptures. He made use of a natural watercourse on the site.

=== Construction ===
In 1907, the first stone was symbolically placed during the Second Hague Conference. At this Second Peace Conference, French delegate Baron d’Estournelles de Constant proposed that all participating States contribute resources toward the construction of the Peace Palace:

“The new edifice will be the palace of all the peoples of the earth. Is it not fitting that it should be constructed with material from all countries? It will thus be as suitable in its origin as in its purpose. It will be created of the substance of all for the use of all. […] Greece and Italy could furnish their marbles, America and Asia their woods and precious metals, Germany, England, Russia, France, Japan and Spain and all the countries of the earth their masterpieces of national art. The individual expense for each country would be almost nothing, while such objects would constitute one of the world’s most unique collections, well worthy of our International Court of Arbitration.”

The suggestion was well received, and during its plenary session on 16 October 1907, the Conference formally expressed the hope that each signatory government of the Hague Convention would assist in building the Palace of the Permanent Court of Arbitration by providing, in coordination with the architect, materials for construction and decoration, along with artworks showcasing the finest examples of their national craftsmanship. The aim was for the Court’s headquarters—the symbol of universal goodwill and hope—to be built from contributions representing all nations.

As a result, the palace is filled with many gifts of the Contracting Parties of the Permanent Court of Arbitration as a sign of their support for the Court's mission. Among the gifts are a 3.2-tonne (3.1-long-ton; 3.5-short-ton) vase from Russia, doors from Belgium, marble from Italy, a fountain from Denmark, the clock for the clock tower from Switzerland, Persian rugs from Persia, wood from Malaysia, Indonesia, Brazil and the United States of America and wrought-iron fences from Germany.

One of these gifts is the set of intricate silk tapestries adorning the walls of the Permanent Court of Arbitration’s Administrative Council Chamber. Titled “A hundred flowers and a hundred birds in late spring and early summer”, the tapestries were a gift from Japan and were hand-woven using small silk loops in the “Tsuzure Nishiki” technique by 48,600 skilled Japanese artisans over the course of four years.

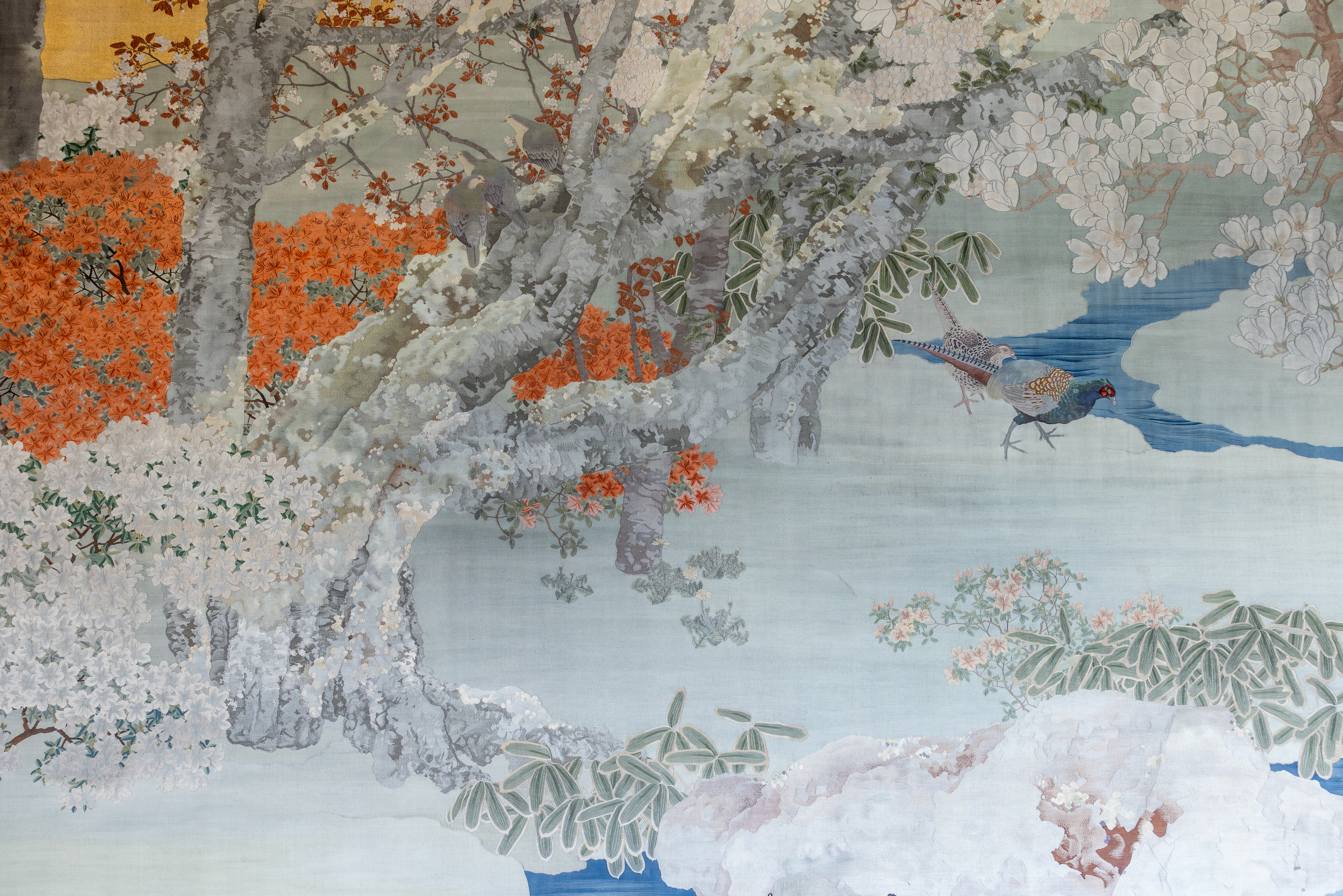

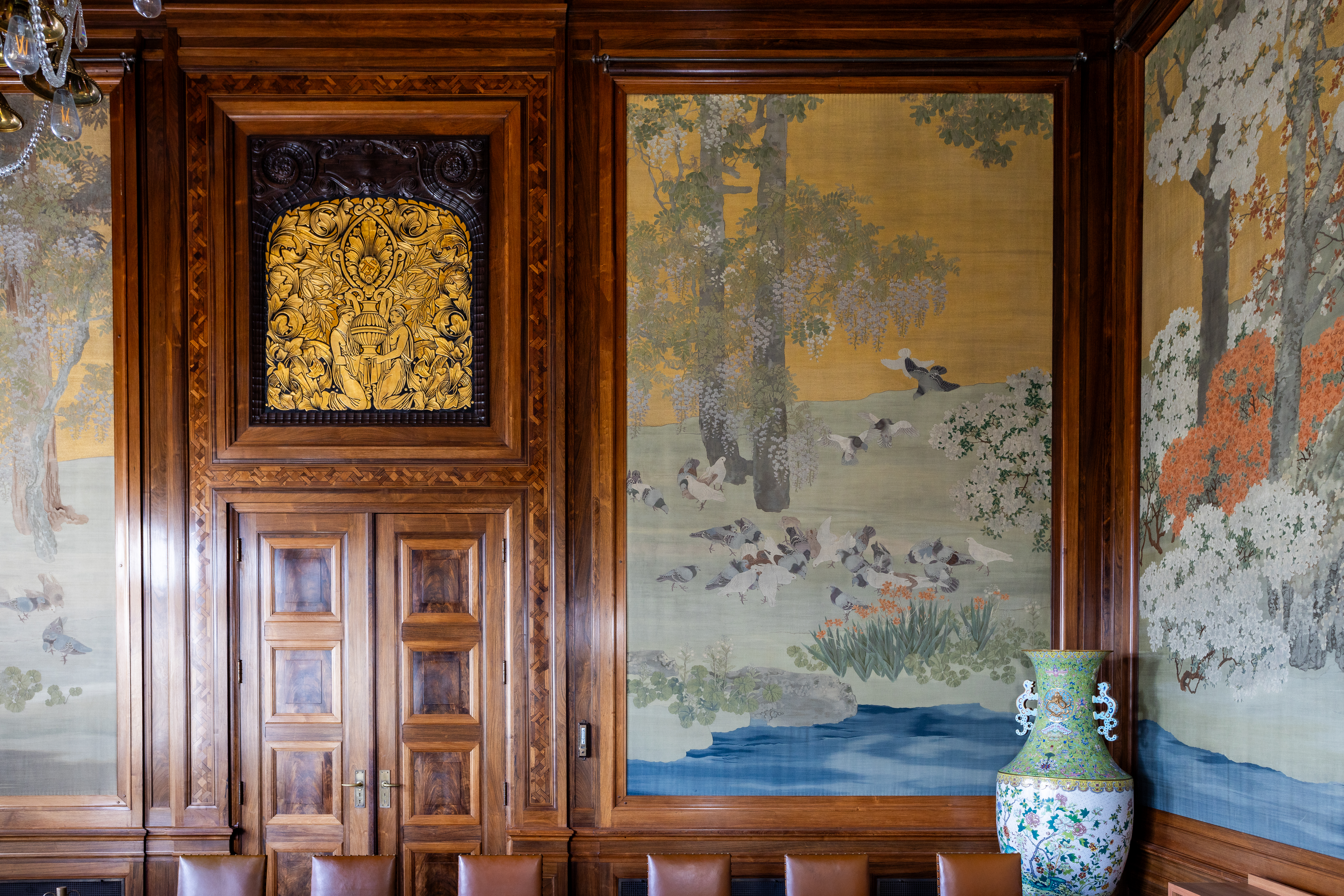

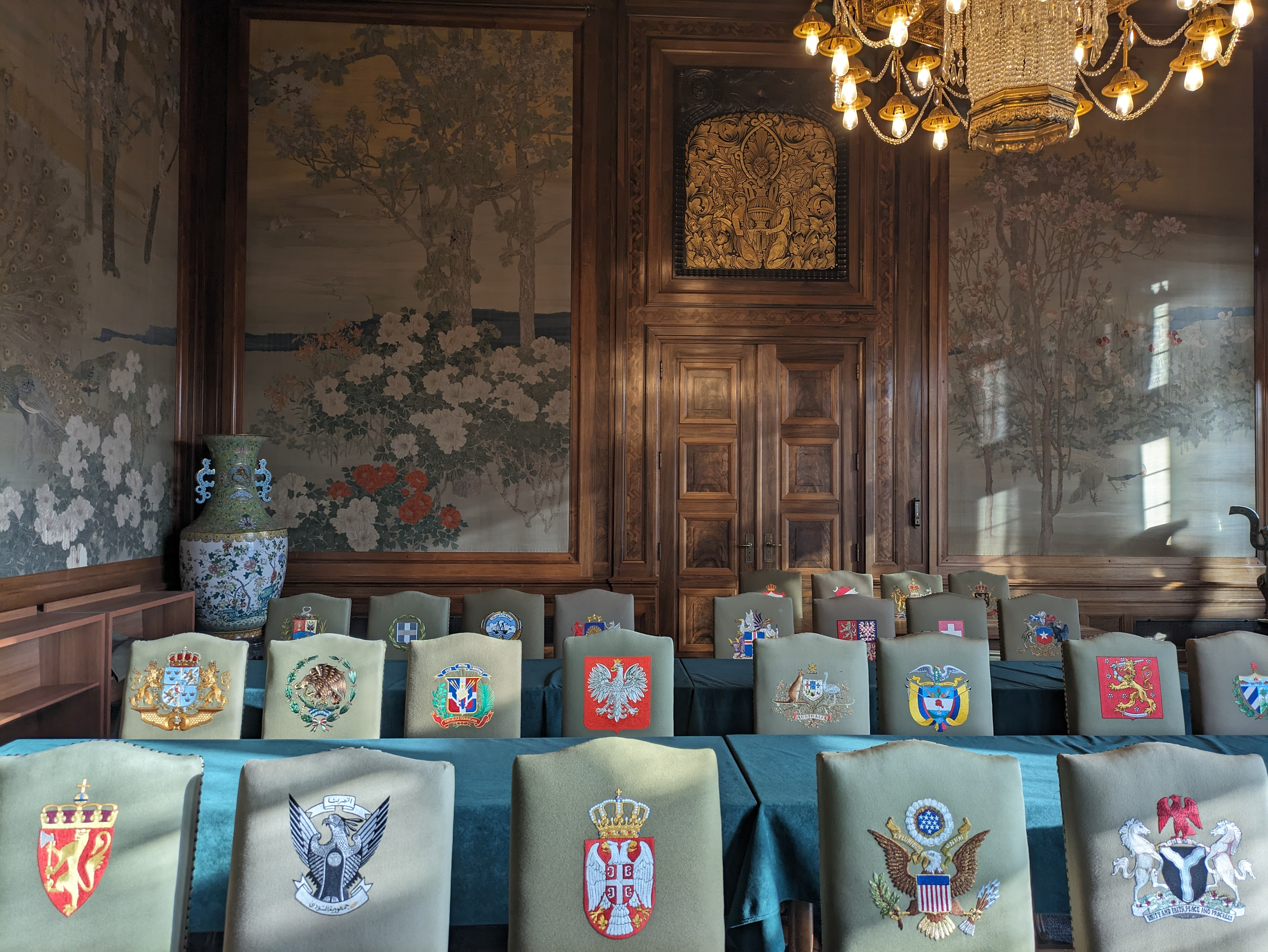

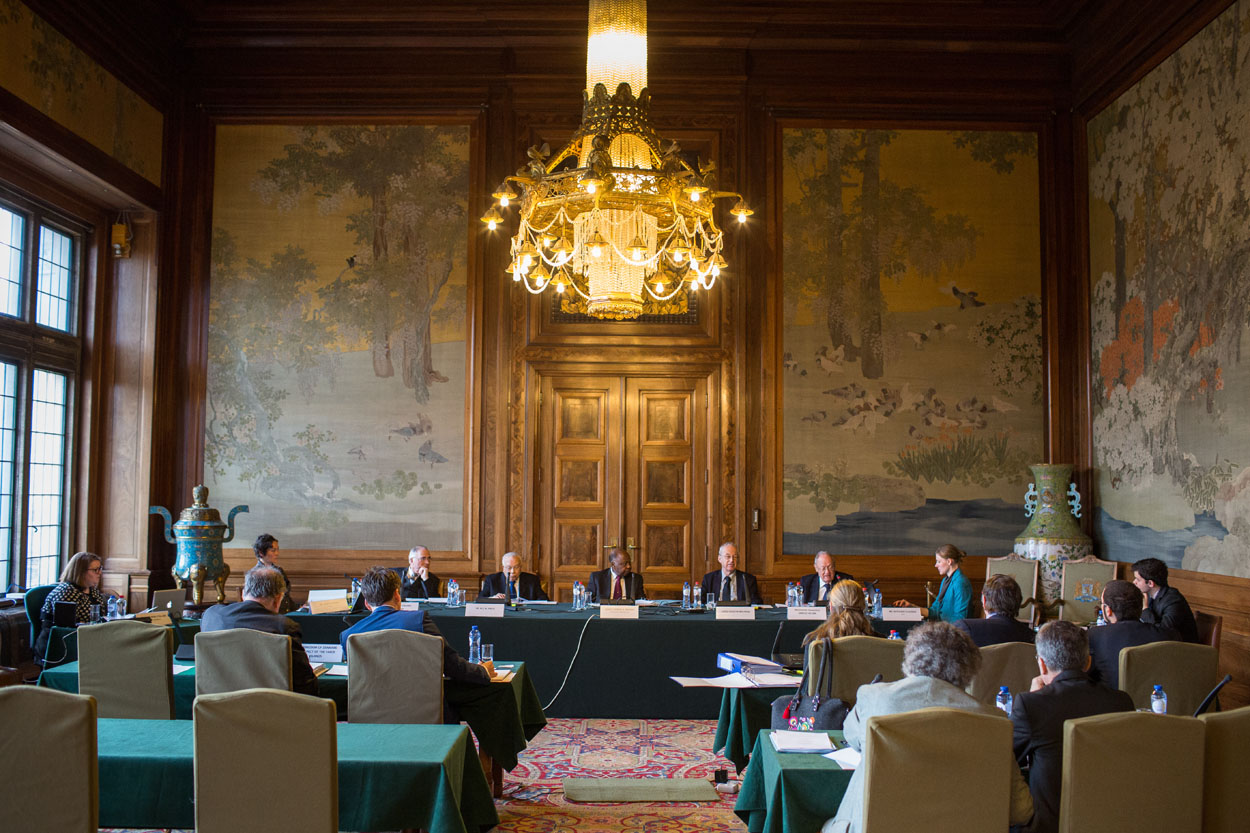

The construction began some months after the Second Hague Peace Conference and was completed with an inauguration ceremony on 28 August 1913, attended by the Dutch Royal Family, members of the Permanent Court of Arbitration, diplomats, politicians and peace activists. During the ceremony, the key to the Peace Palace was handed over to the Secretary-General of the Permanent Court of Arbitration, leading Andrew Carnegie to predict that the end of war was "as certain to come, and come soon, as day follows night."

In 2007, Queen Beatrix opened the new building for the Peace Palace Library of International Law, housing the entire catalogue of the library, a lecture hall and a new reading room in the bridge to the main building of the Peace Palace. Like the new Academy Hall, the library was designed by architects Michael Wilford and Manuel Schupp.

The European Heritage Label was awarded to the Peace Palace on 8 April 2014.

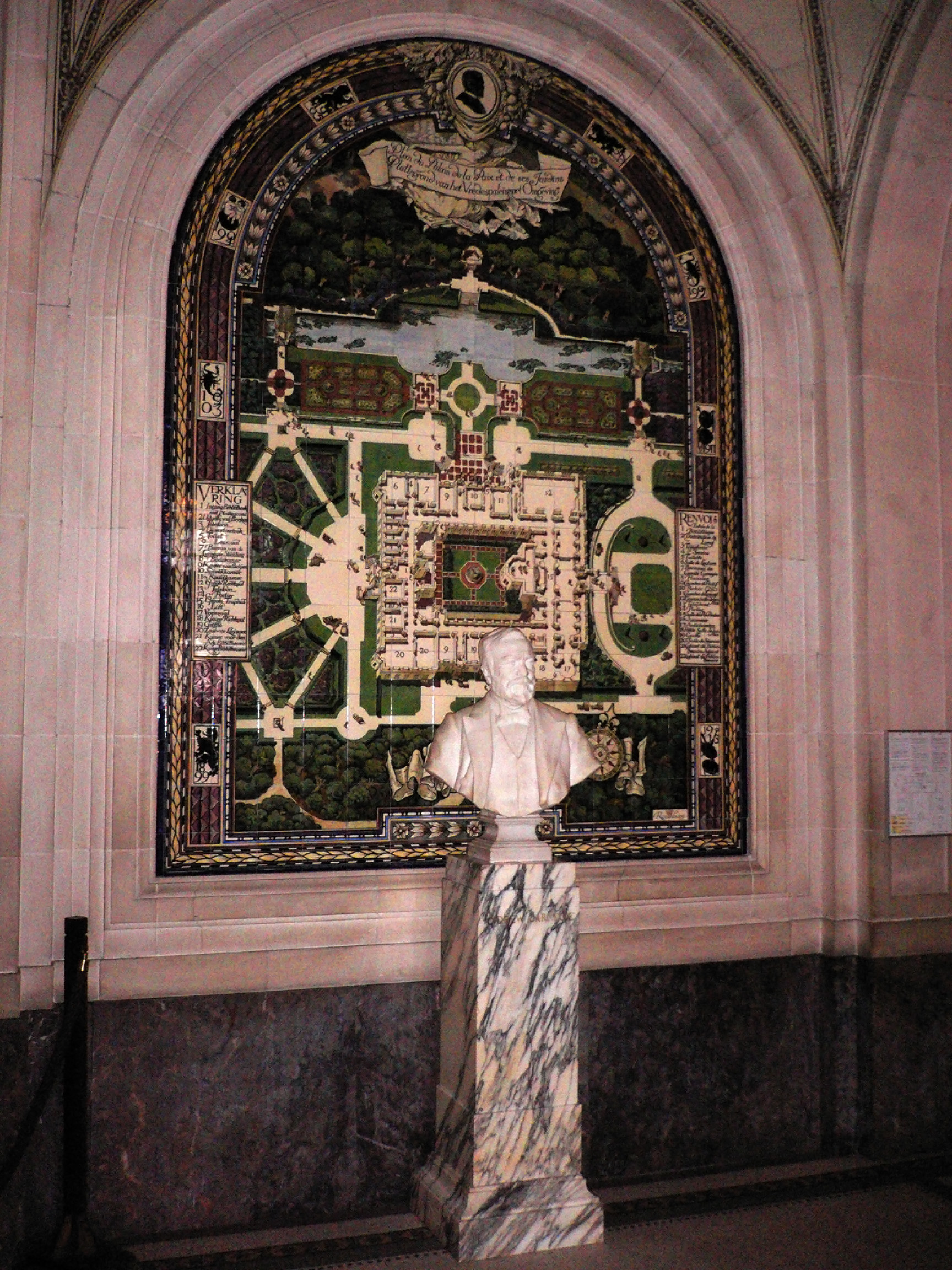
Bust of Carnegie and the original plan of the Peace Palace

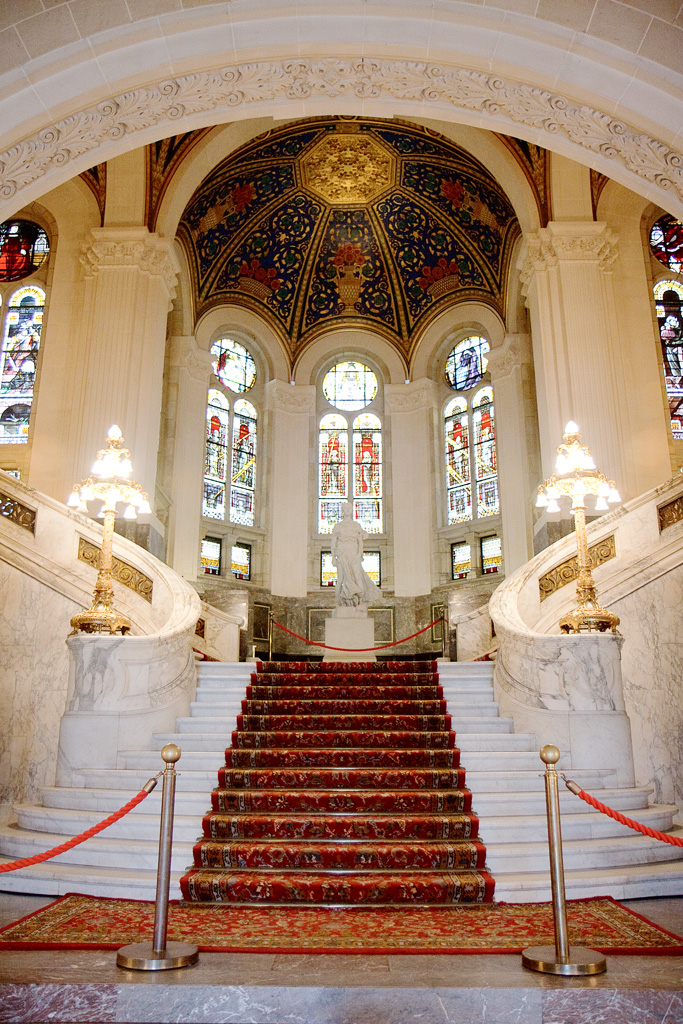
Inside the Peace Palace

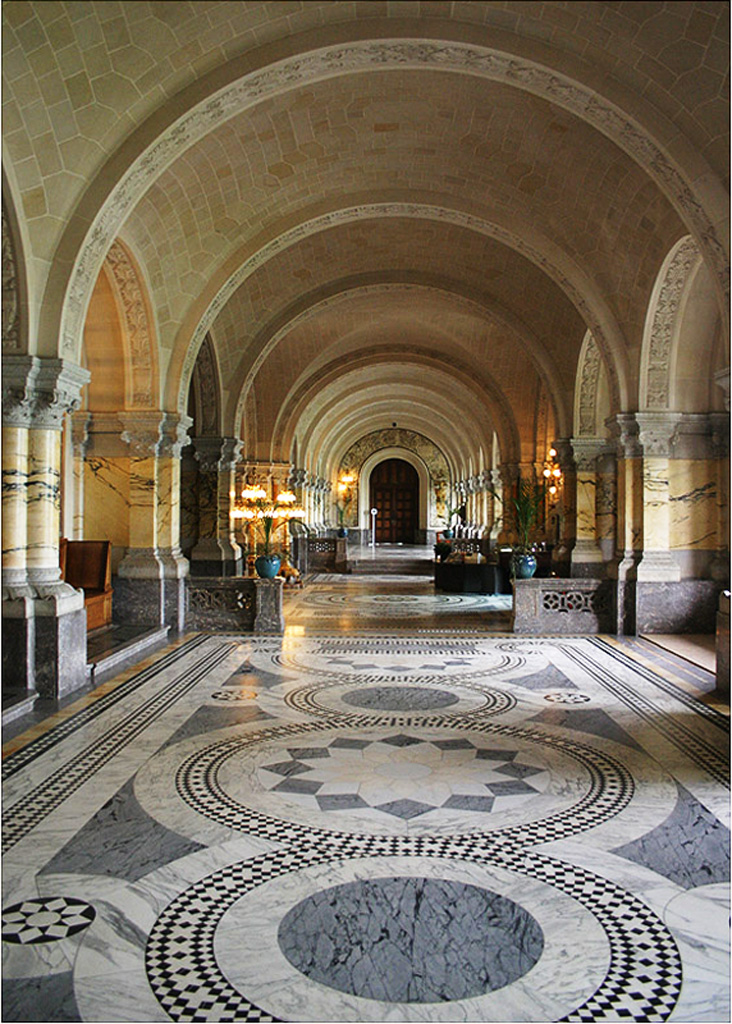
Main hall of the Peace Palace. The background is the entrance of the Courtroom of the International Court of Justice.

== Courts ==
Two international courts are headquartered at the Peace Palace:

- Permanent Court of Arbitration (1913–present) The original court for which the Peace Palace was constructed. From 1901 until the opening of the palace in 1913, the Permanent Court of Arbitration was housed at Prinsegracht 71 in The Hague.
- International Court of Justice (1946–present) and its predecessor, the Permanent Court of International Justice (1922–1946). In 1922, the Permanent Court of International Justice of the League of Nations was added to the occupants. This meant the library was forced to move to an annex building, and the Permanent Court of Arbitration was moved to the front left of the building. In 1946, when the United Nations replaced the League of Nations, the International Court of Justice was established as the UN's principal judicial organ.

In addition, the following organisations are also housed in the Palace:

- Peace Palace Library of International Law (1913–present). The library grew quickly to house the best collection of material on international law. Although this stature is well in the past, the library still contains some original classical works, as the original copies of Hugo Grotius' works on peace and law and Erasmus' Querela Pacis.
- The Hague Academy of International Law (1923–present). Established in 1914, strongly advocated by Tobias Michael Carel Asser. Funds for the academy came from another peace project by Andrew Carnegie, namely the Carnegie Endowment for International Peace, established in 1910.

Other international courts in The Hague, the Iran–United States Claims Tribunal, the International Criminal Tribunal for the former Yugoslavia, and the International Criminal Court, are separate organizations, located elsewhere in The Hague.

== Interior ==
Statues, busts and portraits of prominent peace campaigners from around the world

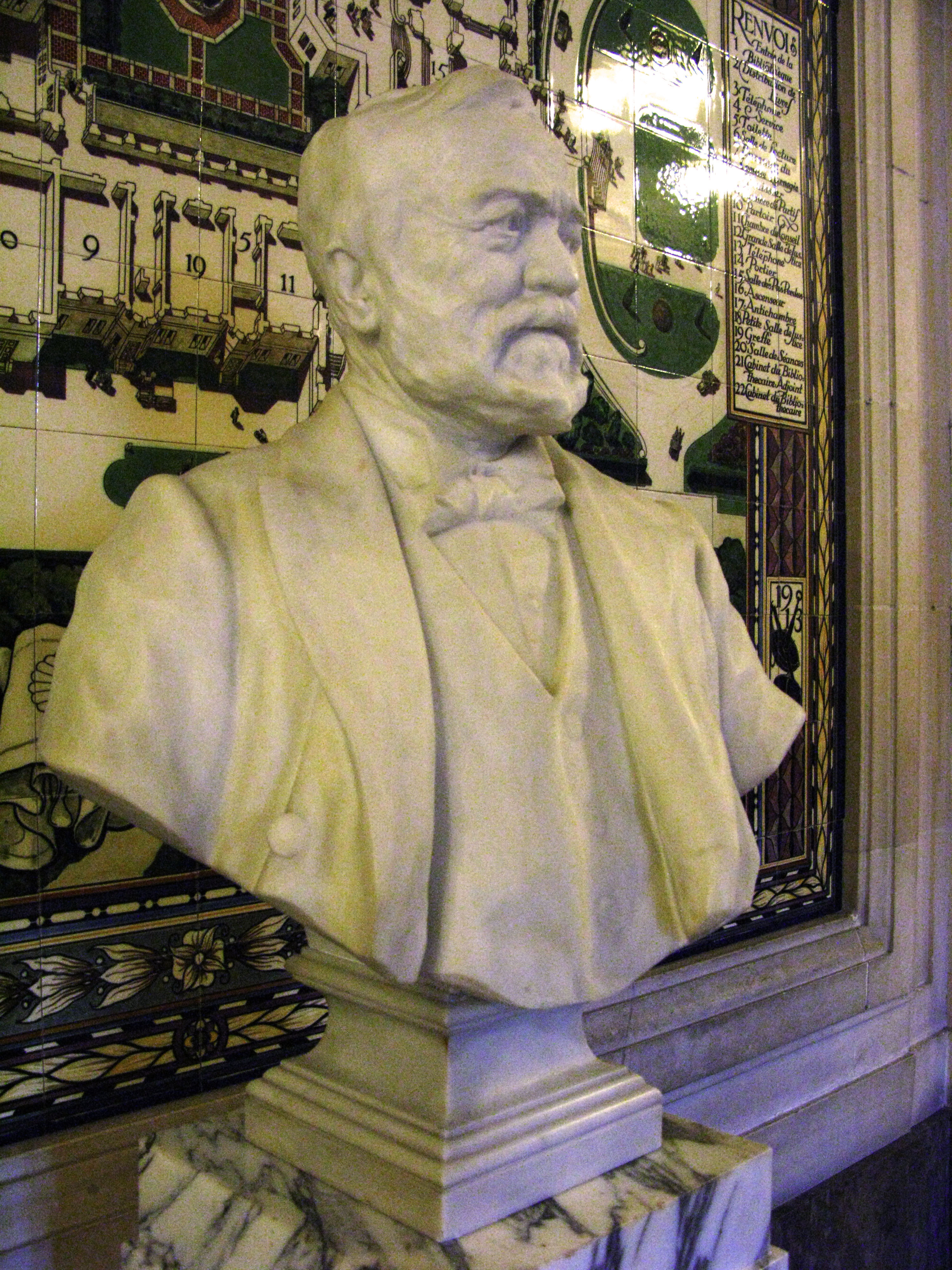
Andrew Carnegie

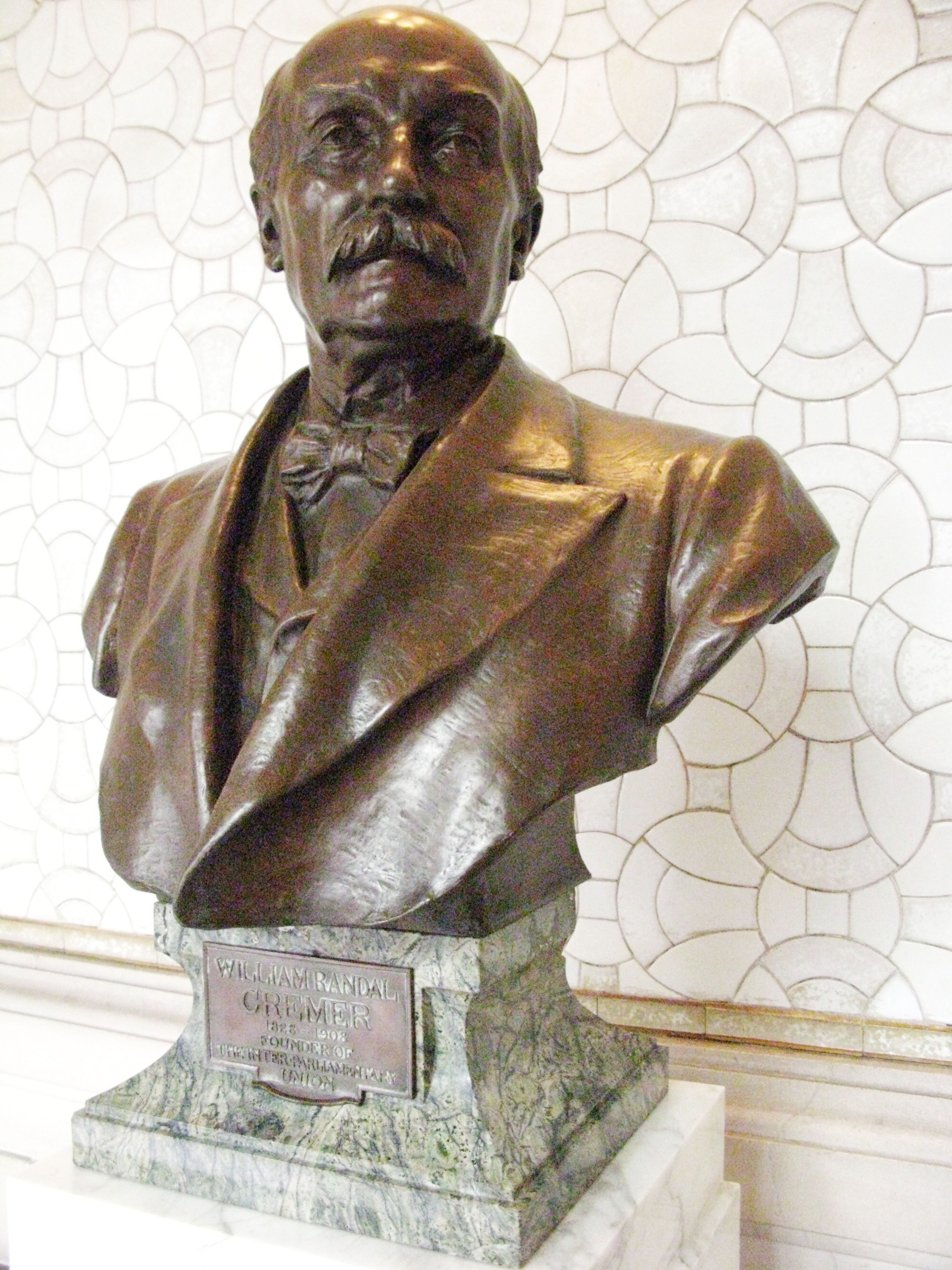
William Randal Cremer

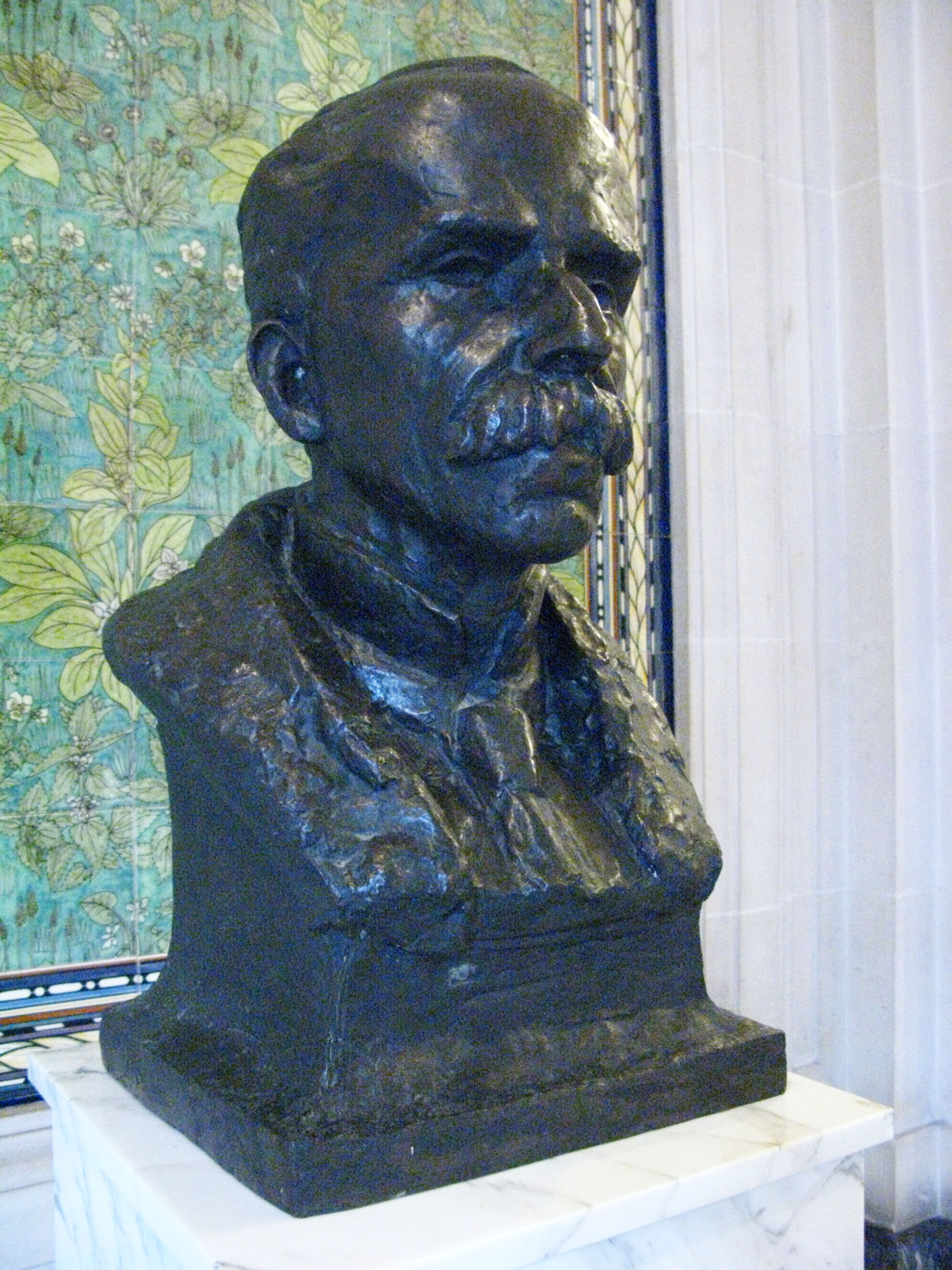
Ruy Barbosa

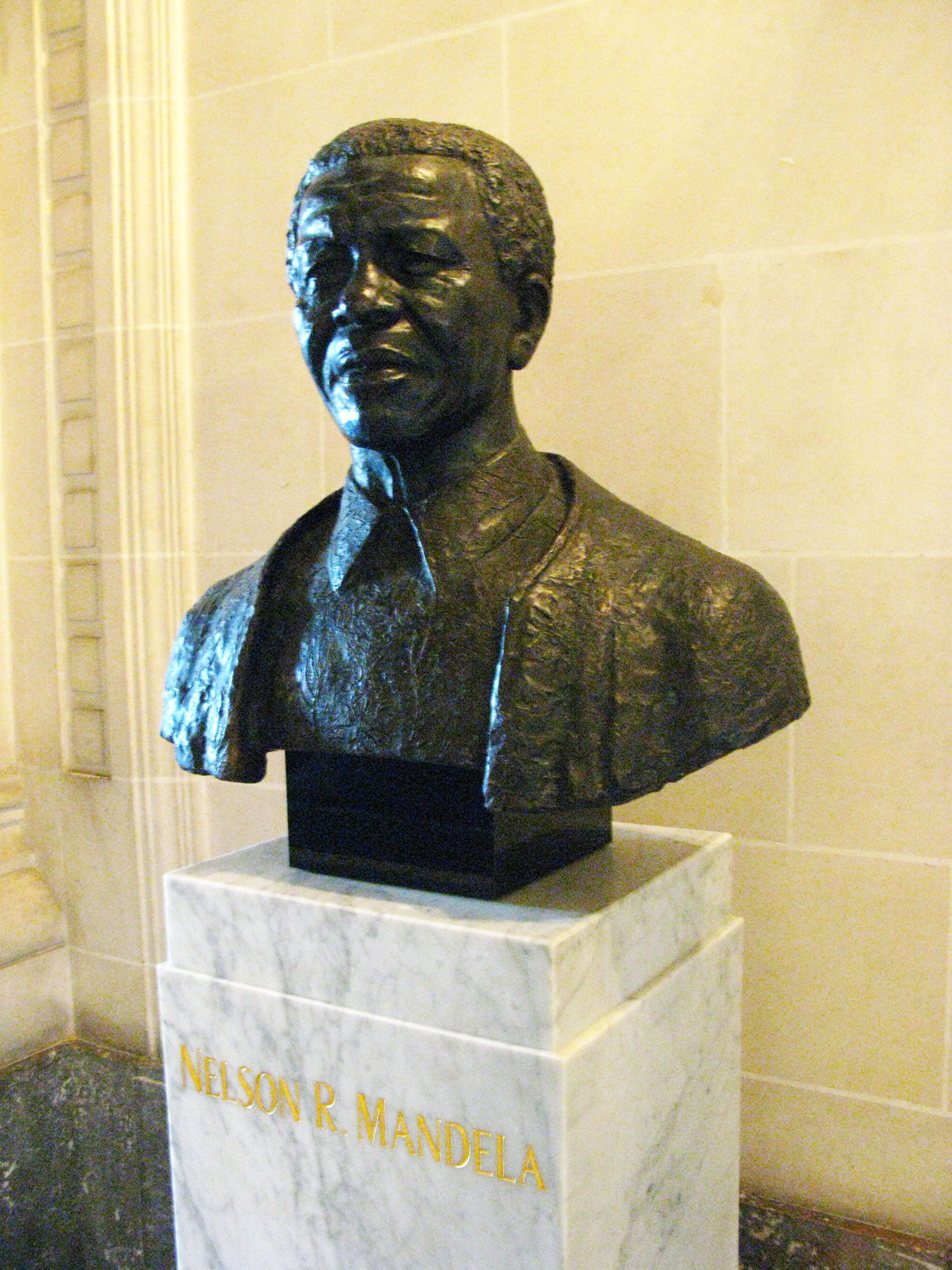
Nelson Mandela

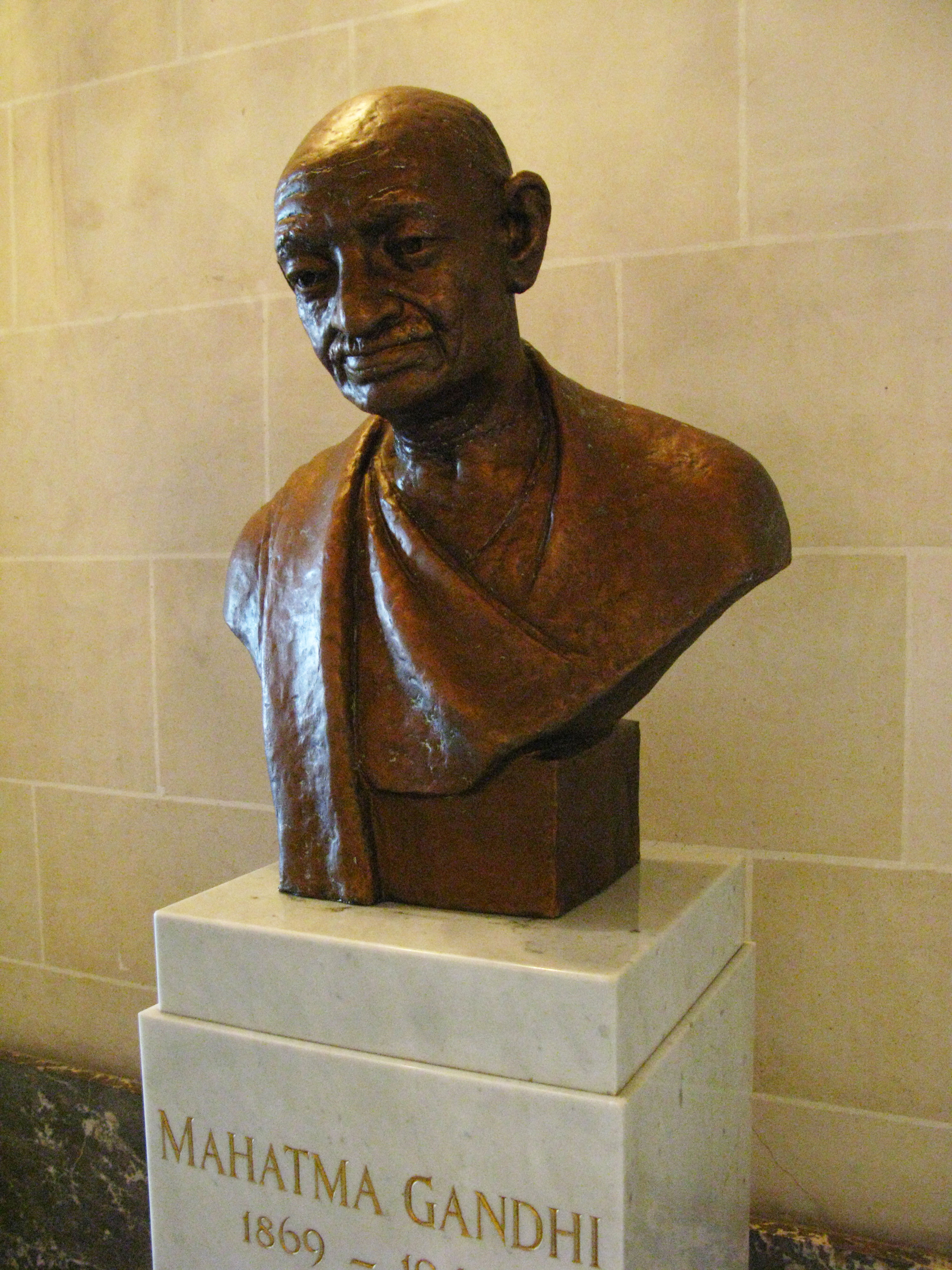
Mahatma Gandhi

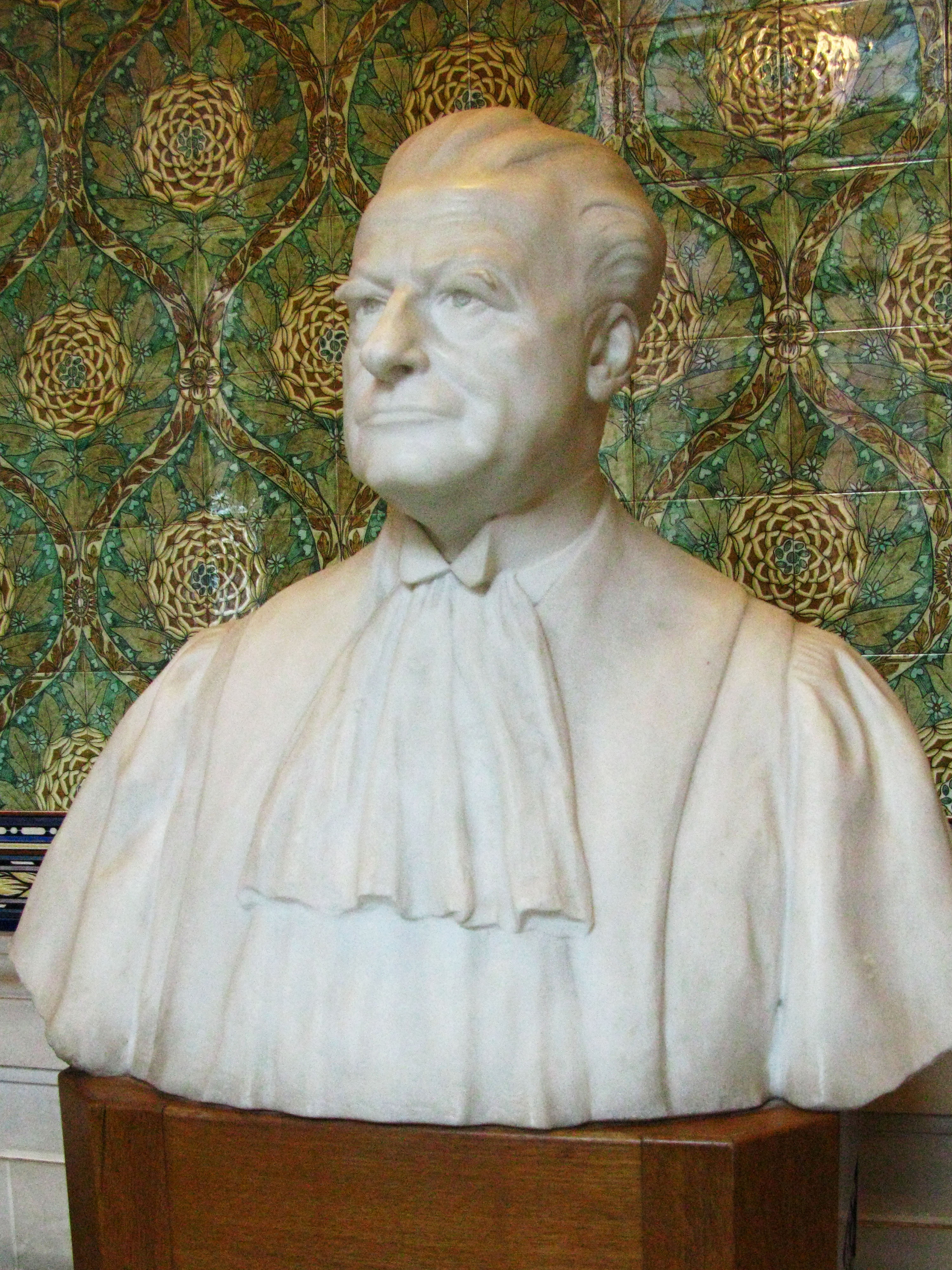
Bernard Loder

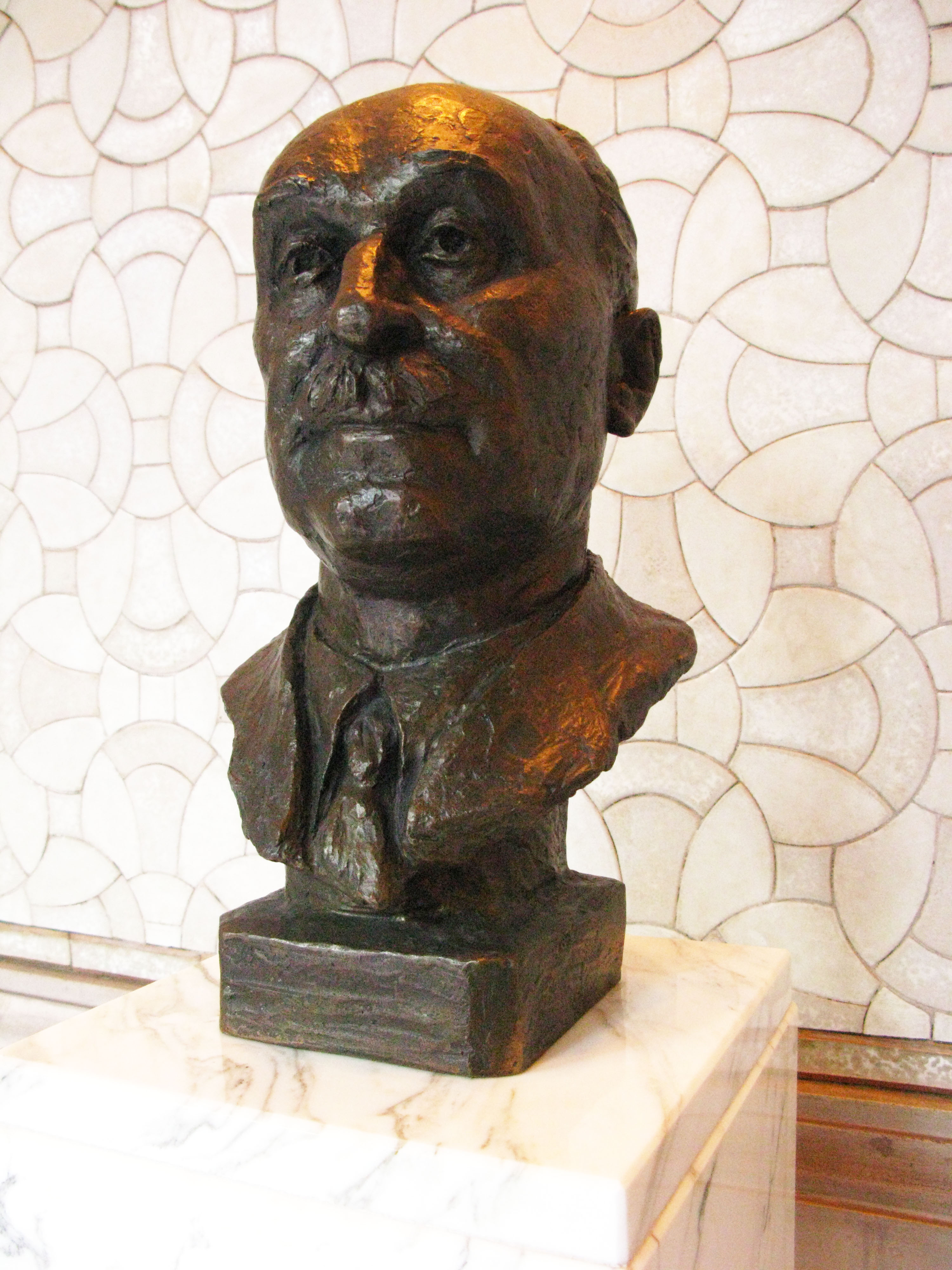
Jean Monnet

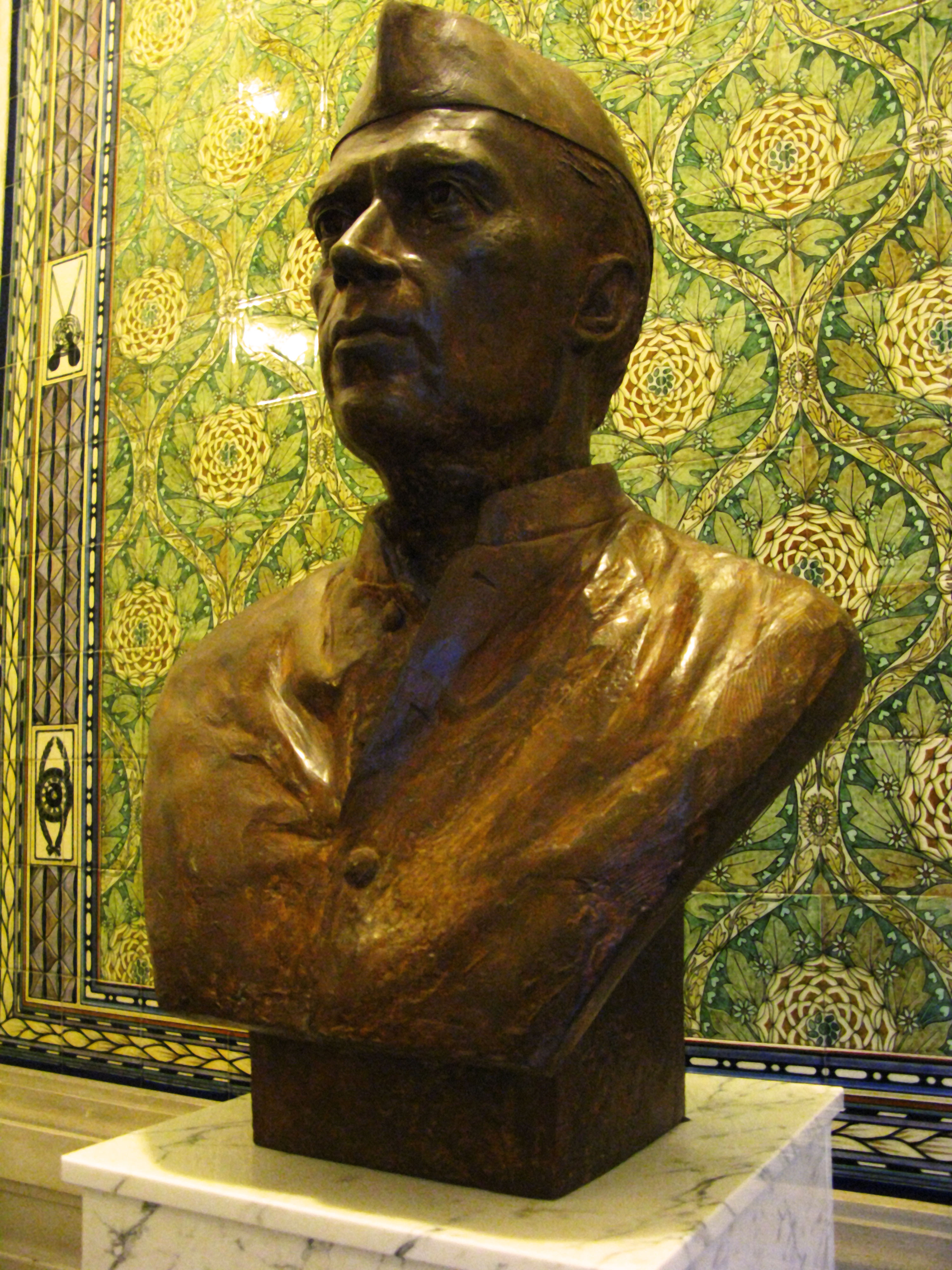
Jawaharlal Nehru

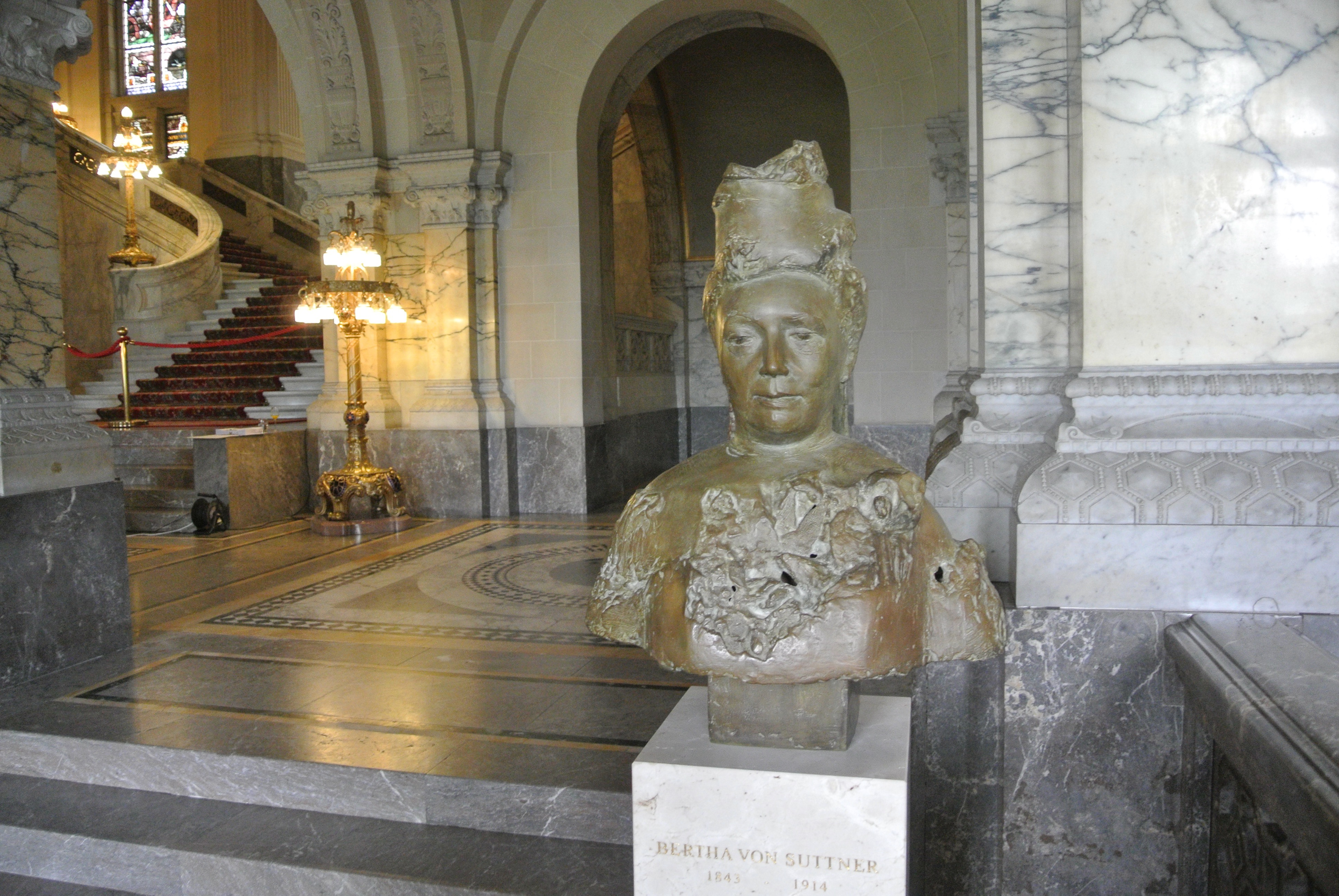
Bertha von Suttner

The palace also features a number of statues, busts and portraits of prominent peace campaigners from around the world and of all eras.

== See also ==
- Permanent Court of Arbitration
- International Court of Justice
