= Louis Marie Cordonnier =

French architect (1854–1940)

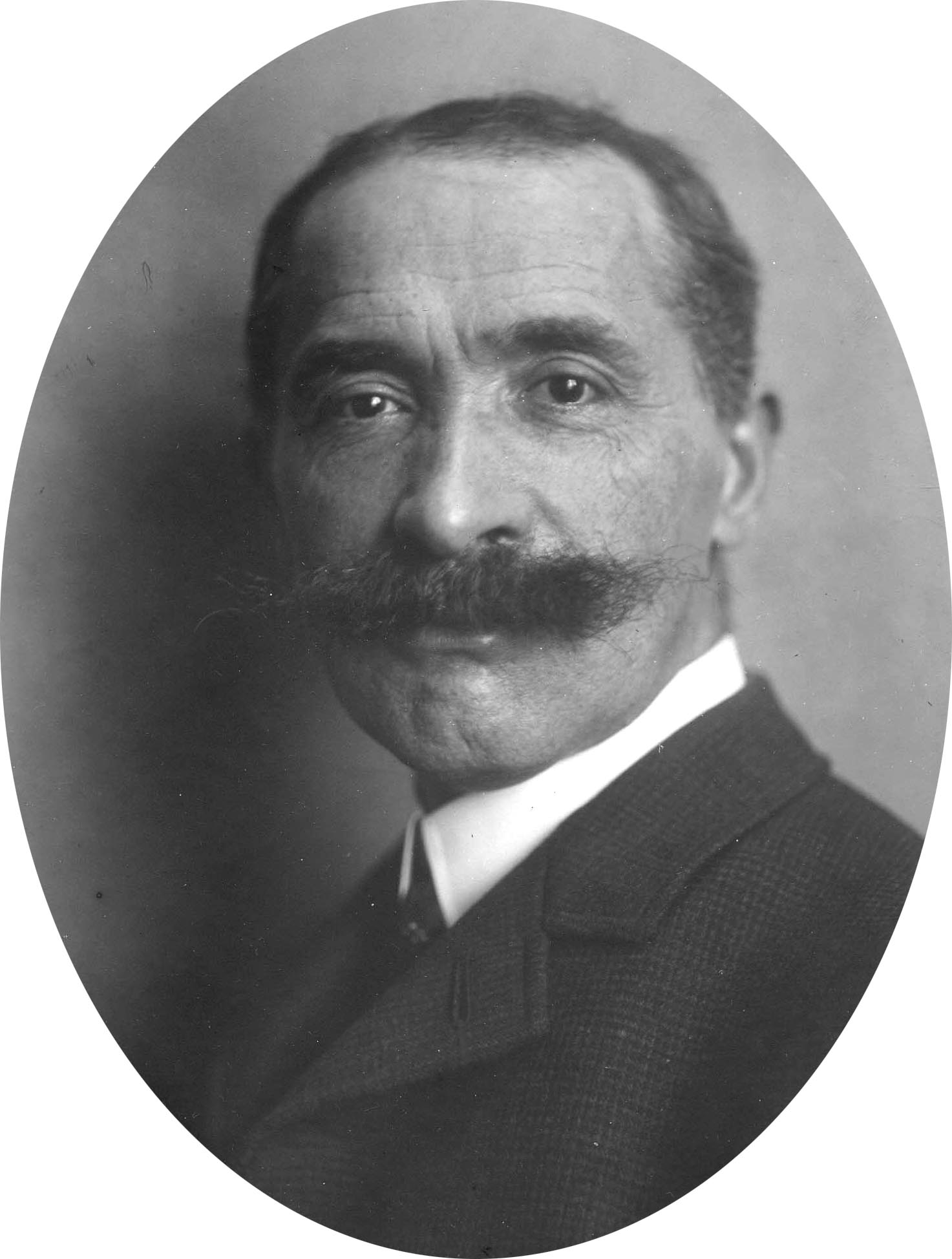
Louis Marie Cordonnier (date unknown)

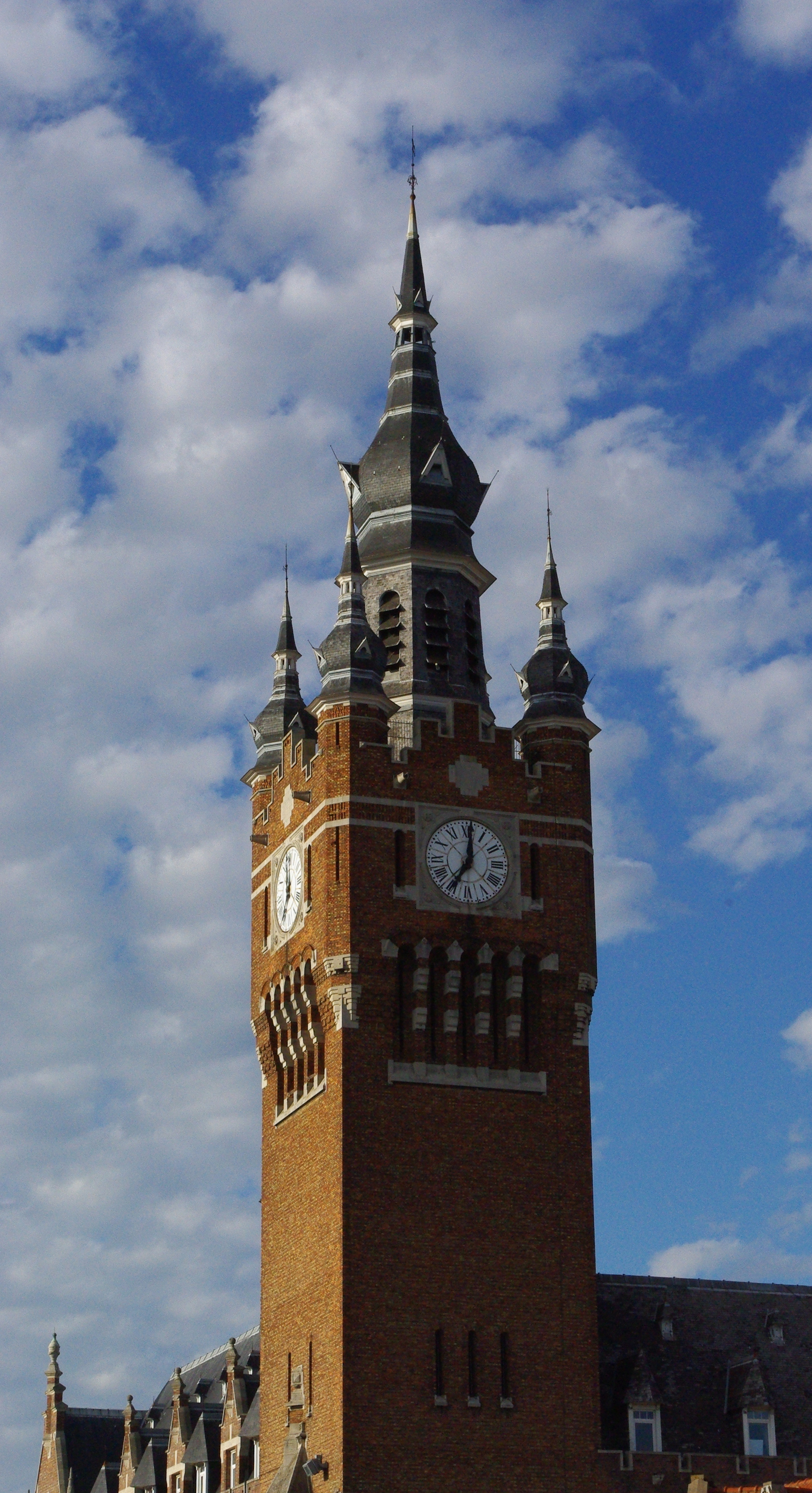
Belfry, Armentières

Louis Marie Cordonnier (July 7, 1854, Haubourdin, Nord – 1940) was a French architect, born in Haubourdin and associated principally with Lille and the French Flanders region. He was influenced by Viollet le Duc.

== Biography ==
Son of the architect Jean-Baptiste Cordonnier (1820–1902), Cordonnier studied at the École des Beaux-Arts in Paris. He returned to Lille for his first major commission, the 1881 town hall of Loos. His chosen style was a strongly regional Flemish Renaissance Revival in brick, with a characteristic belfry tower.

Further civic commissions in the area culminated in Cordonnier's best known work, the Peace Palace in The Hague, seat of the International Court of Justice. There his neo-Flemish entry won a design competition against far more modern competitors like Hendrik Berlage and Otto Wagner. The jury's choice proved controversial enough to fuel lawsuits for seven years.

Cordonnier alternated his regional Flemish style with occasional essays in the neo-classical Beaux-Arts style so prevalent in Paris during these years. In Lille the architect's Flemish Chamber of Commerce building of 1910–21 stands twenty paces away from his Beaux-Arts Opéra de Lille of 1903–14, its design said to be inspired by Garnier's Paris Opera.

In the wake of the widespread destruction of World War I in this part of France, Cordonnier took the lead in efforts to rebuild civic buildings and local churches in strictly traditional style, although not averse to using structural concrete. Towards the end of his career he was joined in practice by his son, Louis-Stanislas Cordonnier (1884–1960).

== Work ==
His work includes:

- Hôtel de Ville, Loos, 1884
- Hôtel de Ville, La Madeleine, 1892
- Hôtel de Ville, Dunkirk, 1901
- the Opéra de Lille, built 1903–1914
- The seaside resort of Hardelot, c.1905–1908
- Notre-Dame-de-Lille Pellevoisin, Lille, 1906–1911
- the Peace Palace in The Hague, 1907–1913
- series of seaside mansions and villas at Neufchâtel-Hardelot, circa 1908–1912
- Chamber of Commerce de Lille, 1910–1921
- Basilica and memorial building, Notre Dame de Lorette war cemetery, 1921–1927
- the Basilica of St. Thérèse, Lisieux, the second-largest pilgrimage site in France, after Lourdes, 1923–1959
- Church of St. Vaast, Béthune, 1924–1927
- Grands Bureaux of the Societe des Mines in Lens 1928–1930 (now the Jean Perrin Faculty of Science)
- Hôtel de Ville, Bailleul, 1932
- Hôtel de Ville, Comines, 1932
- Hôtel de Ville, Armentières, 1934
- Church of St. Vaast, Bailleul, 1935
- Grands bureaux de la Société des Mines headquarters, in Lens, Pas-de-Calais, with landscape architect Achille Duchêne, 1928–1930, now part of Artois University

Four of the Belfries of Belgium and France designated by UNESCO as a World Heritage Site. Of the 23 such municipal towers within Nord-Pas-de-Calais and the Somme, Cordonnier designed those in Loos, Dunkirk, Comines, and Armentières.

== Gallery ==
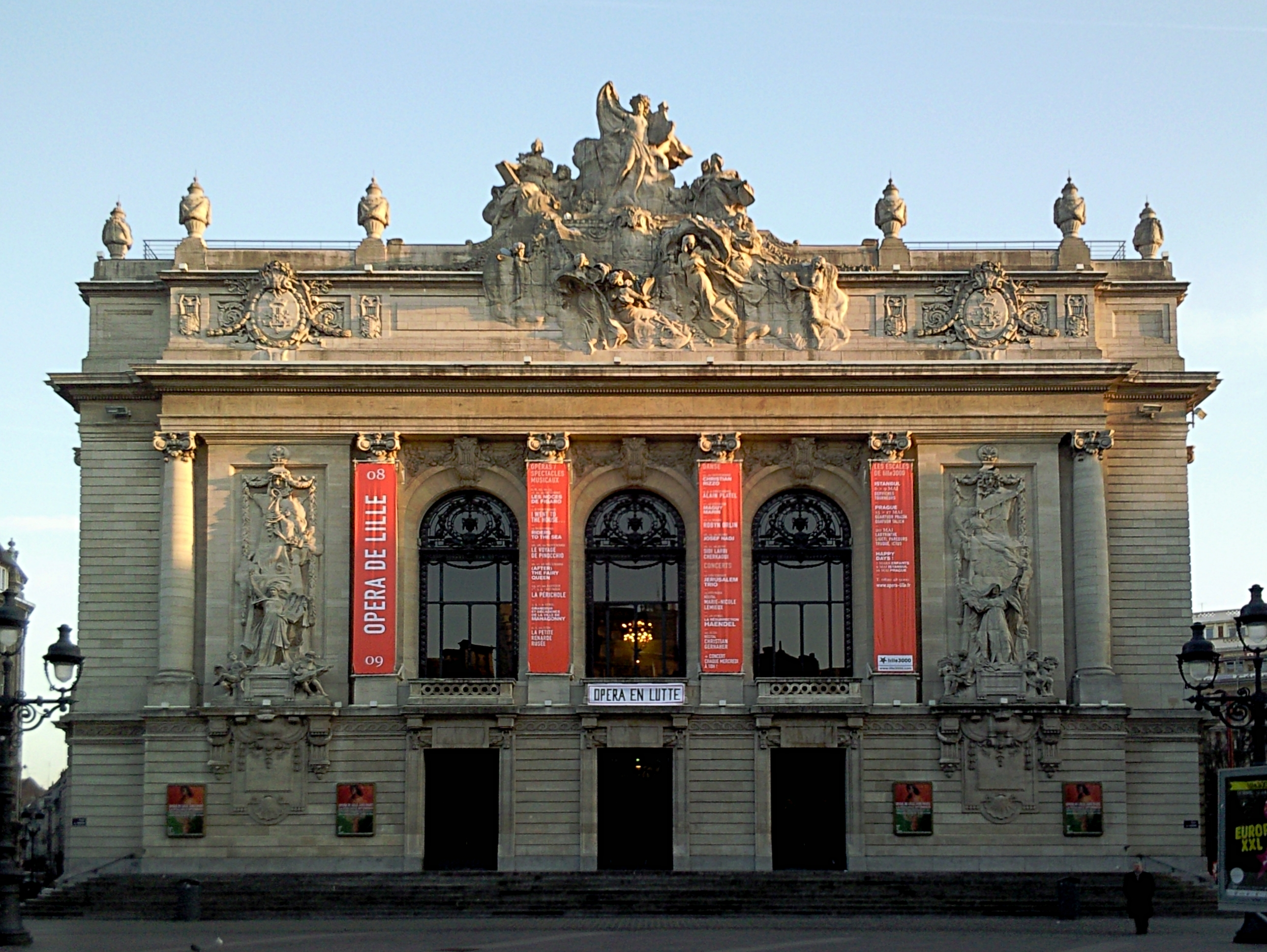
Opéra de Lille

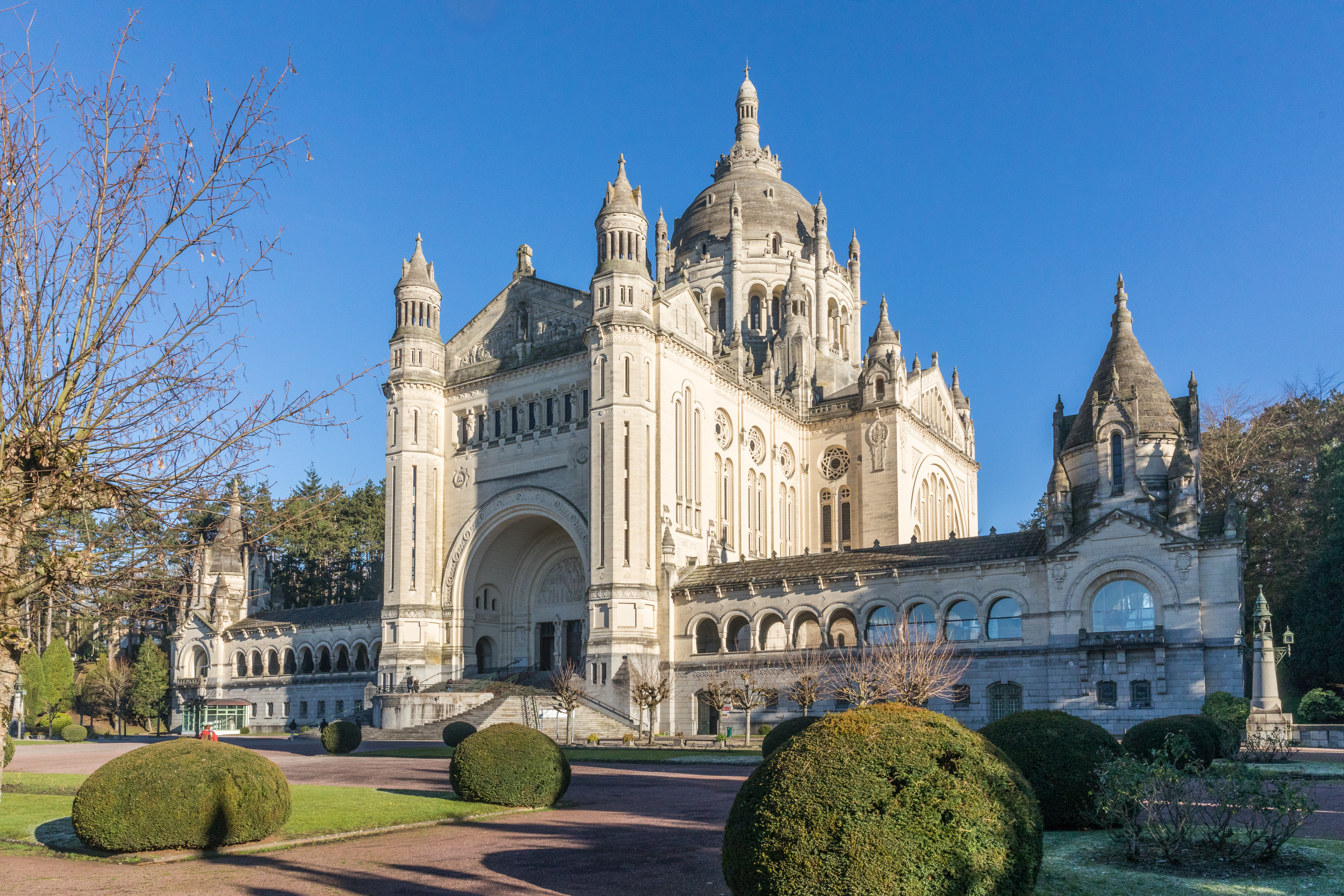
Basilica of St. Thérèse, Lisieux

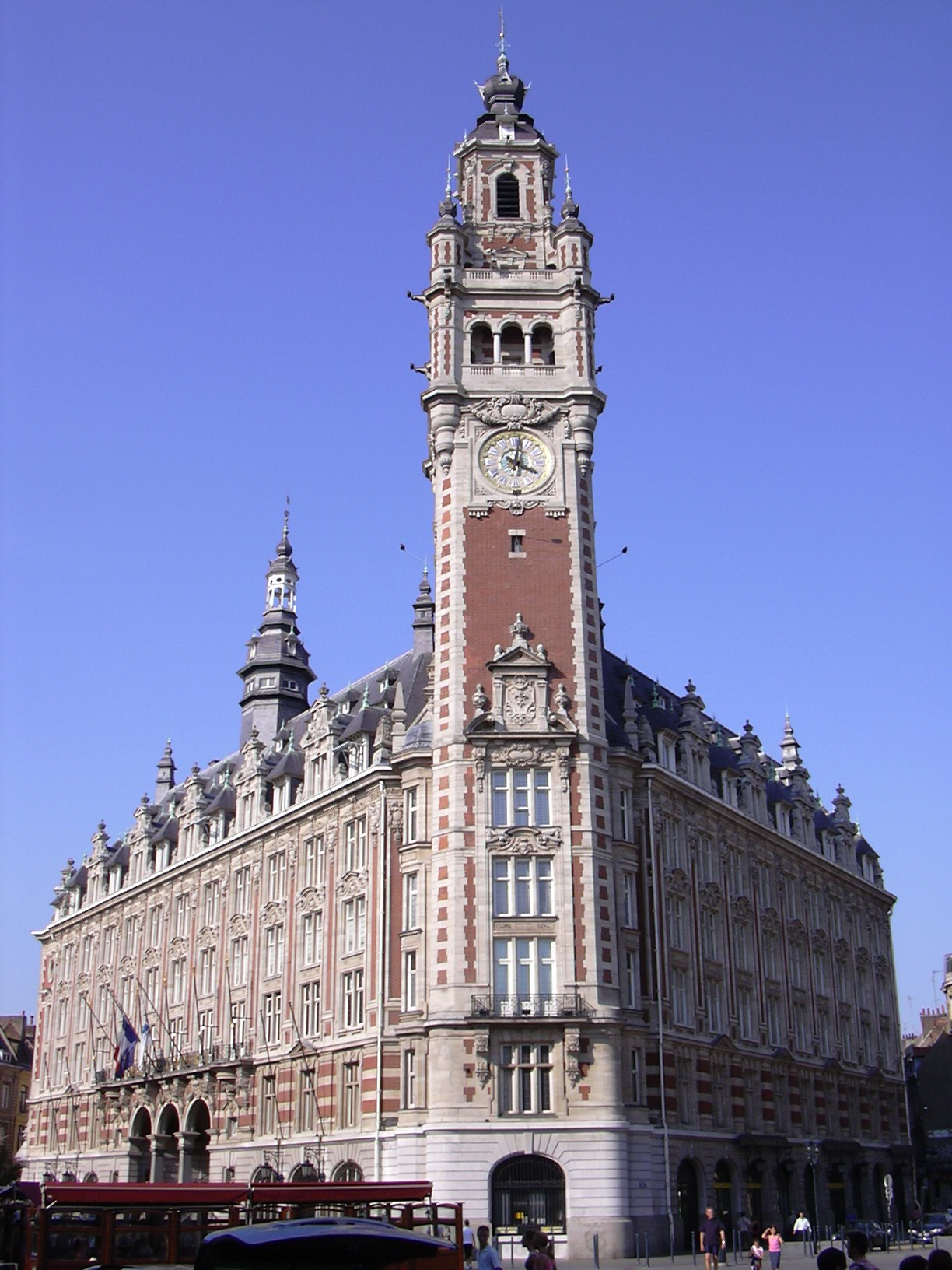
Chamber of Commerce, Lille

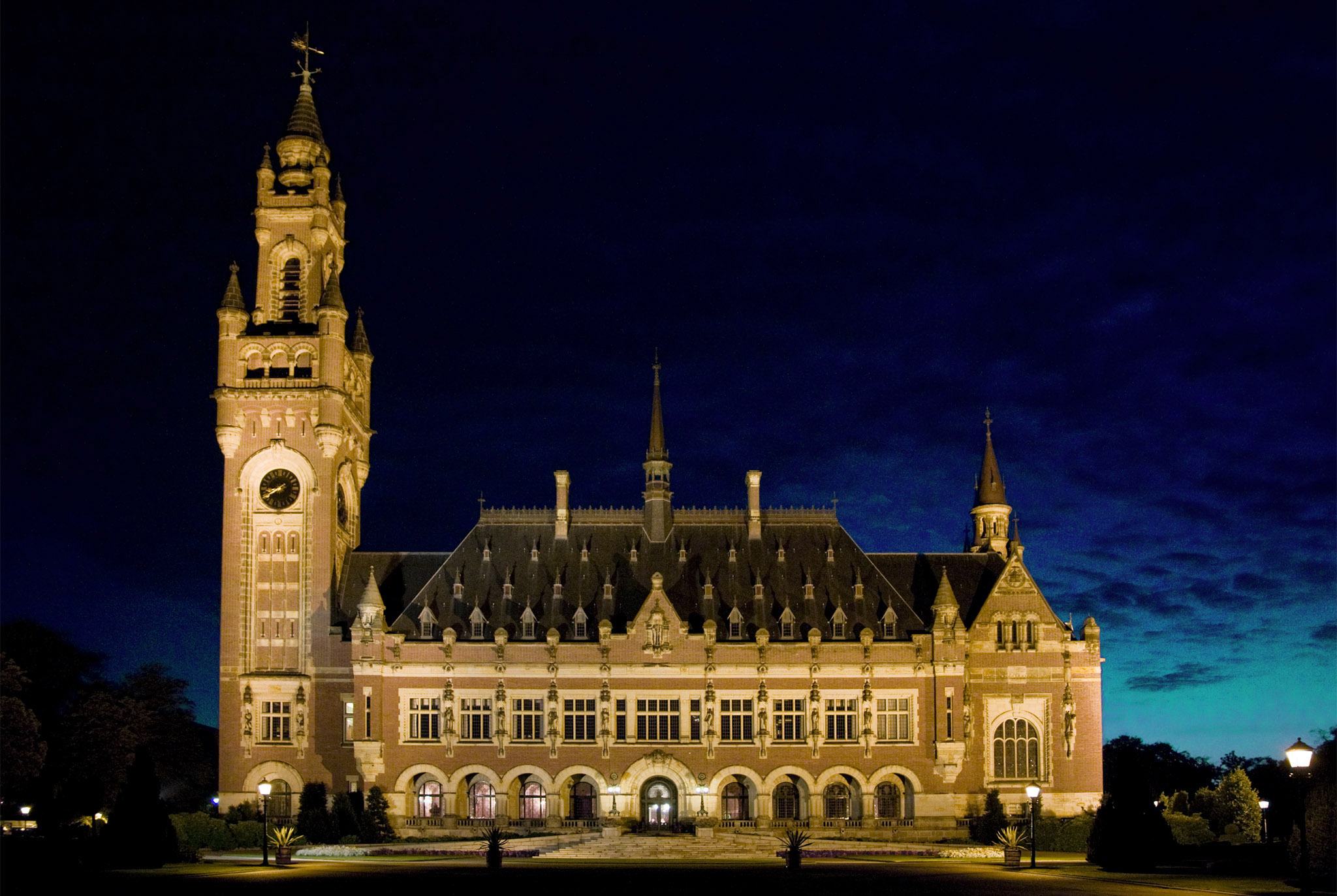
Peace Palace in The Hague

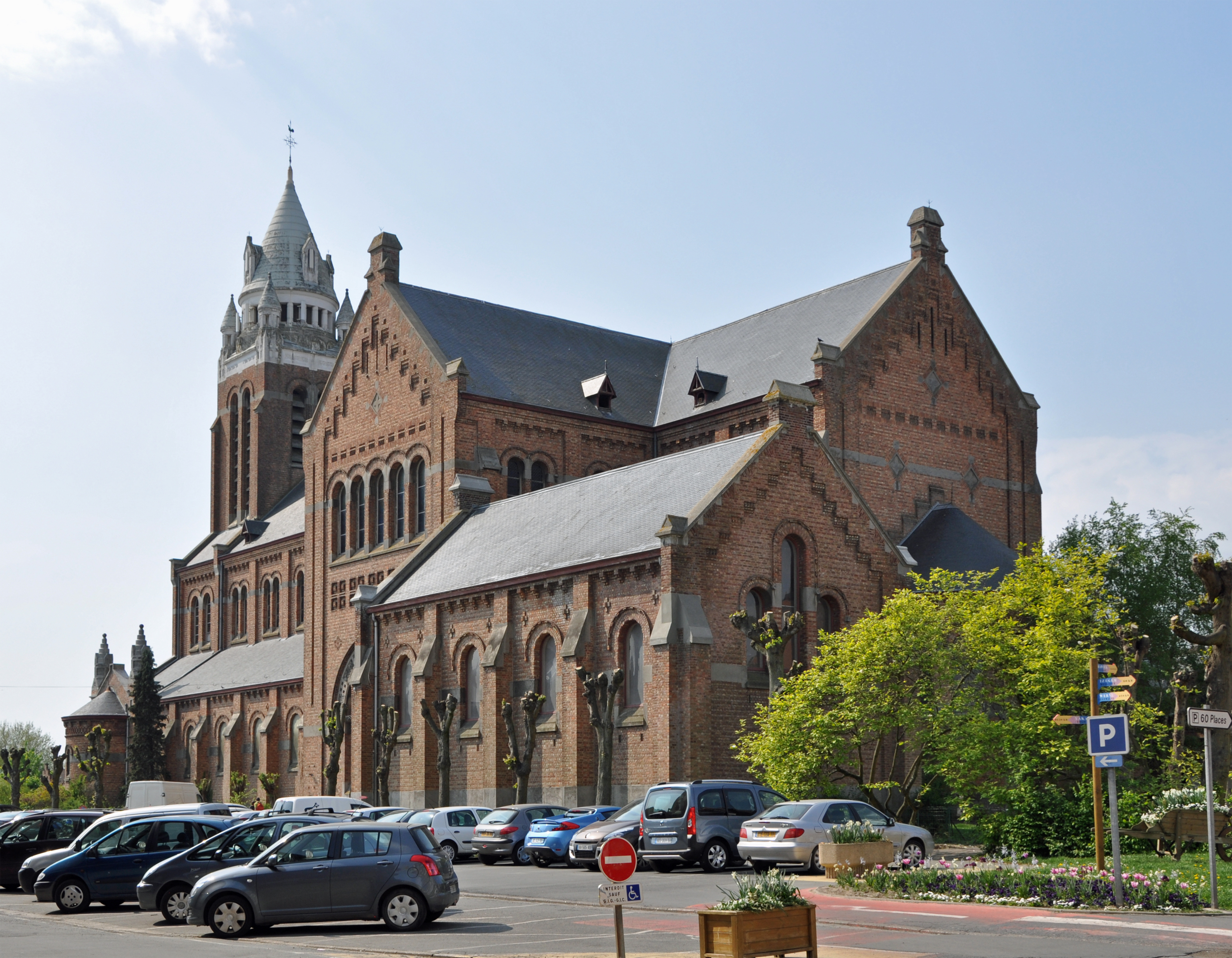
Church of St Vaast, Bailleul

The Lantern of the Dead at the Notre-Dame-de-Lorette National Necropolis
