= Hôtel de Ville, Dunkirk =

Town hall in Dunkirk, France

Hôtel de Ville
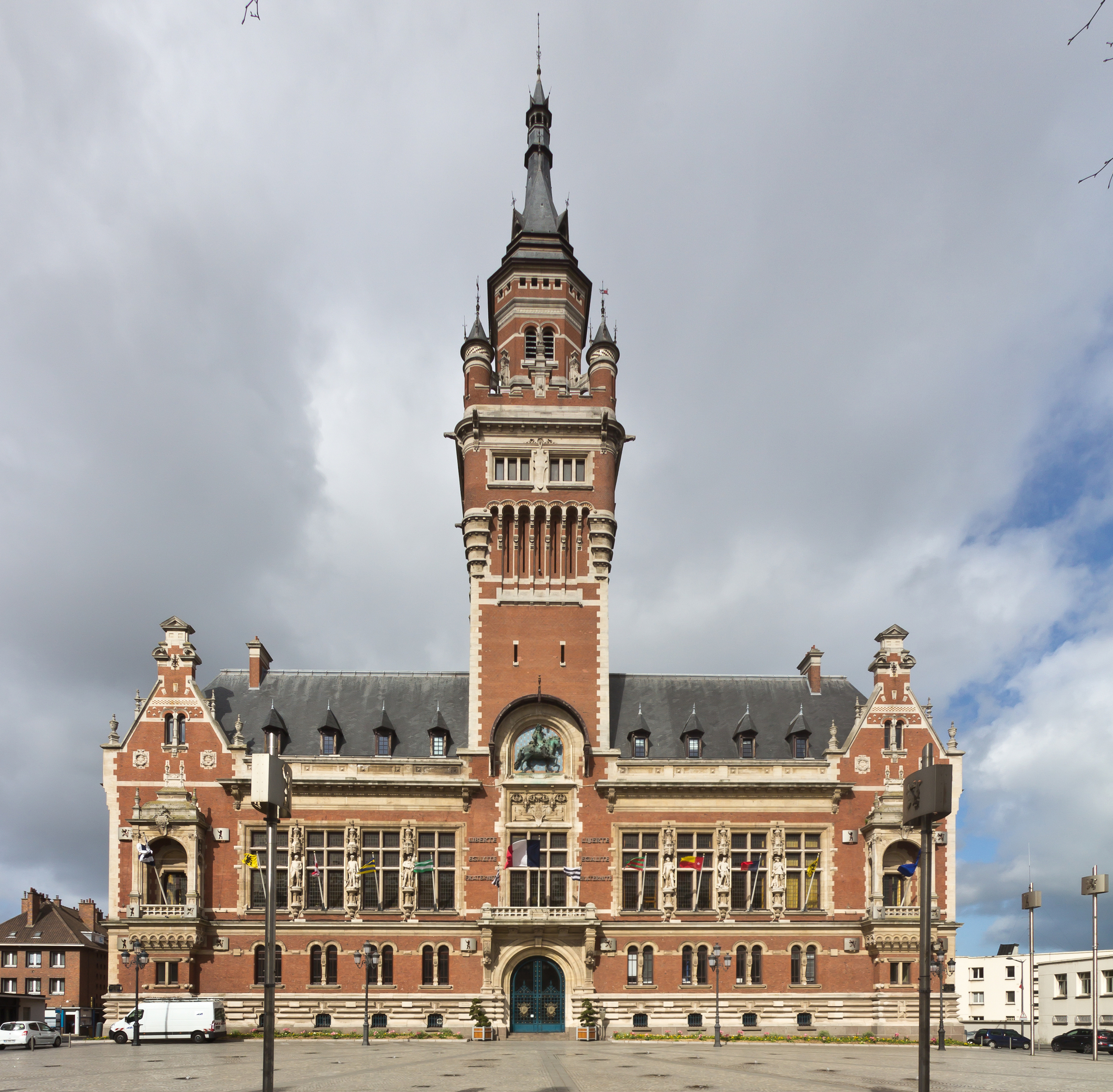
- The main frontage of the Hôtel de Ville in April 2014

General information
- Type: City hall
- Architectural style: Flemish Renaissance Revival style
- Location: Dunkirk, France
- Coordinates: 51.0377°N 2.3766°E
- Completed: 1901

Height
- Height: 75 metres (246 ft)

Design and construction
- Architects: Louis Marie Cordonnier

UNESCO World Heritage Site
- Part of: Belfries of Belgium and France
- Criteria: Cultural: ii, iv
- Reference: 943
- Inscription: 1999 (23rd Session)

Monument historique
- Official name: Hôtel de ville
- Type: Inscrit
- Designated: 1989
- Reference no.: PA00107900

The Hôtel de Ville (French pronunciation: [otɛl də vil], City Hall) is a municipal building in Dunkirk, Nord, northern France, standing on the Place Charles Valentin. It was designated a monument historique by the French government in 1989.

== History ==
The first town hall of Dunkirk was erected on the current site in 1233. Gravelines and Dunkirk had been under English control, when they were attacked by the French marshal, Paul de Thermes, in 1558 during the Italian War of 1551–1559. The re-building of the town hall, which had been completely destroyed in the attack, was completed in 1562. The new structure, which was designed in the Gothic Revival style and featured fine stained glass windows, was reduced to a shell during a fire in 1642, and the subsequent reconstruction was completed in 1644. The new structure was embellished in the neoclassical style with a prominent tetrastyle portico, formed with four Ionic order columns in 1812.

However, by the late 19th century, the building was dilapidated and the council decided to commission a new town hall on the same site. The foundation stone for the new building was laid on 30 May 1897. It was designed by Louis Marie Cordonnier in the Flemish Renaissance Revival style, built in red brick with stone dressings and was officially opened by the president of France, Émile Loubet, in the presence of Nicholas II of Russia, on 17 September 1901.

The design involved a symmetrical main frontage of eleven bays facing onto Place Charles Valentin. The central bay featured a five-stage clock tower with round headed doorway with a moulded surround and a keystone flanked by brackets supporting a balcony in the first stage, a mullioned and transomed window surmounted by a panel in the second stage, a relief of Louis XIV on horseback under a curved arch surmounted by two lancet windows in the third stage, five narrow lancet windows under a series of round headed arches in the fourth stage and six recessed casement windows in the fifth stage. The tower, which was 75 metres (246 ft) high, was castellated, featured bartizans at the corners, and was surmounted by a hexagonal belfry with a spire. The wings of four bays each were fenestrated by paired rounded headed windows on the ground floor and by mullioned and transomed windows separated by statues on the first floor. The end bays featured rounded headed porticos on the first floor and were gabled. The statues depicted, from left to right, the soldier, Armand Charles Guilleminot, the local magistrate, Robert de Cassel, the former mayor, Jean-Marie Joseph Emmery, the naval officer, Pierre Jean Van Stabel, the nobleman, Baldwin III, and the privateer, Michel Jacobsen.

The building was badly damaged by German shelling on 27 May 1940 during the Battle of Dunkirk, part of the Second World War. The interior of the town hall was destroyed, reducing the main structure to a shell. It was rebuilt after the war to a design by the original architect's son, Louis-Stanislas Cordonnier, and was officially re-opened by the president of France, René Coty, on 15 October 1955. The building was extended to the north, with an extra wing completed in 1960, and extended to the south, with an extra wing completed in 1974.

In 2005, its belfry was added to the UNESCO World Heritage Site group of the Belfries of Belgium and France.
