= La Madeleine, Nord =

La Madeleine
- Commune
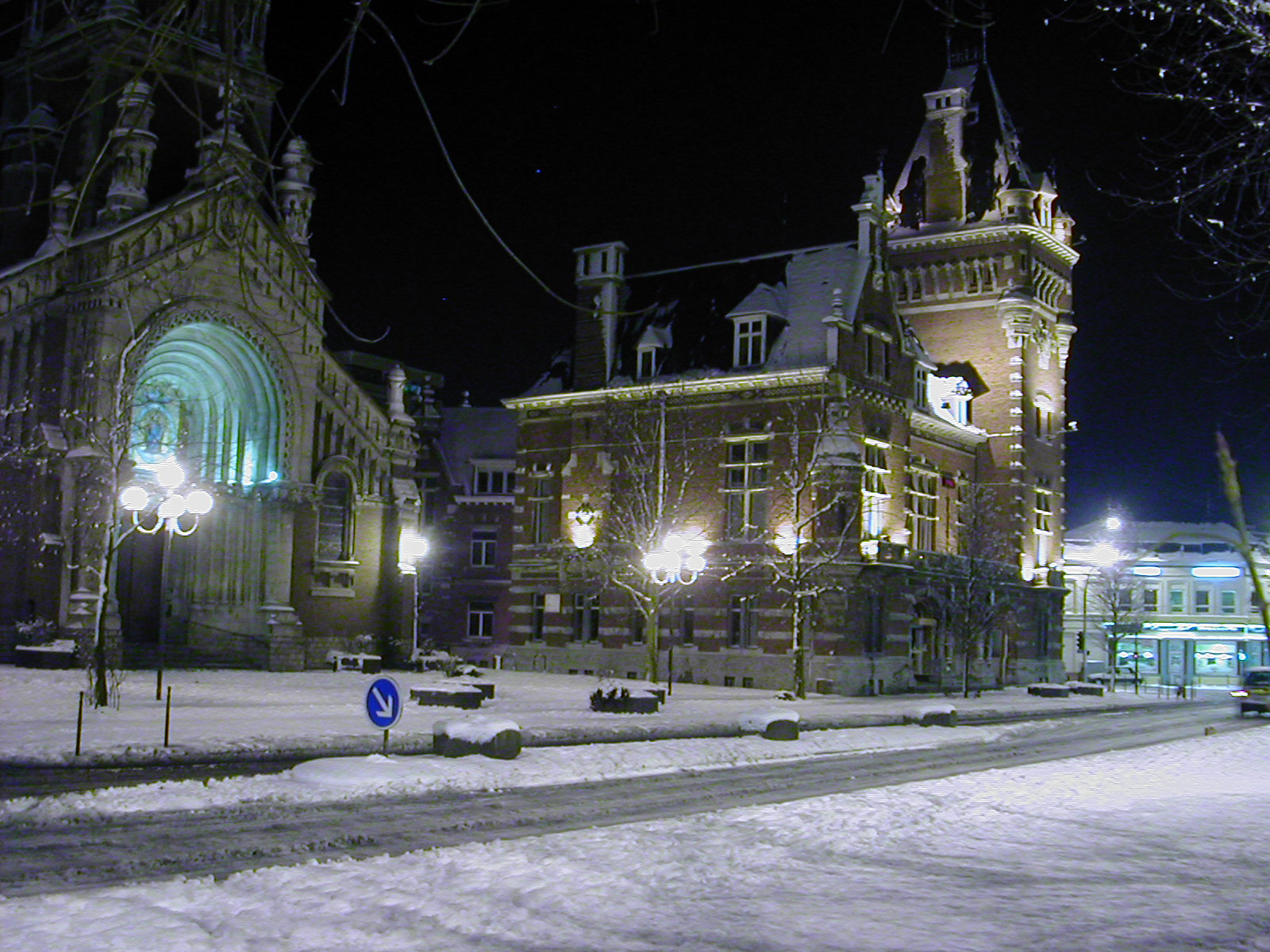
- The Hôtel de Ville

- Coat of arms
- Location of La Madeleine
- Location within France Location within Hauts-de-France
- Coordinates: 50°39′21″N 3°04′16″E
- Country: France
- Region: Hauts-de-France
- Department: Nord
- Arrondissement: Lille
- Canton: Lille-1
- Intercommunality: Métropole Européenne de Lille

Government
  - Mayor (2020–2026): Sébastien Leprêtre
- Area^{1}: 2.84 km^{2} (1.10 sq mi)
- Elevation: 40 m (130 ft)
- Highest elevation: 38 m (125 ft)
- Lowest elevation: 16 m (52 ft)
- Population (2023): 21,790
  - Density: 7,670/km^{2} (19,900/sq mi)
- Time zone: UTC+01:00 (CET)
  - Summer (DST): UTC+02:00 (CEST)
- INSEE/Postal code: 59368 /59110
- ^{1} French Land Register data, which excludes lakes, ponds, glaciers > 1 km^{2} (0.386 sq mi or 247 acres) and river estuaries.

La Madeleine (French pronunciation: [la madlɛn]) is a commune in the Nord department in northern France.

It is a suburb of the city of Lille, bordering it on its north side.

== Heraldry ==
Arms of La Madeleine	The arms of La Madeleine are blazoned : Sable, an eagle argent, beaked and membered Or. (La Madeleine and Pont-à-Marcq use the same arms.)

== History ==
The Hôtel de Ville was completed in 1892.

In 1944, Pierre Marchant and Lucien Olivier, two members of the French resistance from La Madeleine, were killed near Hill 60 (Ypres) by Germans.

== Population ==
Historical population

Year	Pop.	±% p.a.
1793	541	—
1800	611	+1.75%
1806	569	−1.18%
1821	657	+0.96%
1831	788	+1.83%
1836	925	+3.26%
1841	1,126	+4.01%
1846	1,528	+6.30%
1851	1,974	+5.26%
1856	2,443	+4.36%
1861	4,015	+10.45%
1866	5,410	+6.15%
1872	6,348	+2.70%
1876	7,461	+4.12%
1881	8,504	+2.65%
1886	9,060	+1.27%
1891	9,689	+1.35%
1896	10,779	+2.16%
1901	12,359	+2.77%

Year	Pop.	±% p.a.
1906	13,522	+1.81%
1911	15,699	+3.03%
1921	17,902	+1.32%
1926	20,428	+2.68%
1931	21,507	+1.03%
1936	21,501	−0.01%
1946	21,688	+0.09%
1954	22,831	+0.64%
1962	23,381	+0.30%
1968	23,203	−0.13%
1975	20,999	−1.42%
1982	22,115	+0.74%
1990	21,601	−0.29%
1999	22,399	+0.40%
2007	22,428	+0.02%
2012	22,520	+0.08%
2017	21,173	−1.23%
2023	21,790	+0.48%

Source: EHESS and INSEE (1968-2023)

== Education ==
Schools in the commune:

- Public preschools (écoles maternelles): Anne Frank, Courbet, d'Hallendre, du Moulin - Alphonse Daudet, and Gaston Leclercq
- Public elementary schools: Victor Hugo, Louise de Bettignies, Kléber, and Edmond Rostand
- Private preschools and elementary schools: Institution Jeanne d'Arc and Ecole Sainte-Geneviève
- One public junior high school, Collège Flandre
- One private junior high school, Collège privé Saint-Jean
- One public senior high school, Lycée Valentine Labbé

The École Japonaise du Nord-Pas-de-Calais (ノール=パ・ド・カレー日本人学校 Nōsu Pa do Karē Nihonjin Gakkō), a part-time Japanese supplementary school, is held in La Madeleine.

== See also ==
- Communes of the Nord department
