= Basilica of Sainte-Thérèse, Lisieux =

Basilica located in Calvados, in France

Basilica of Sainte-Thérèse of Lisieux
- Basilique Sainte-Thérèse de Lisieux (French)
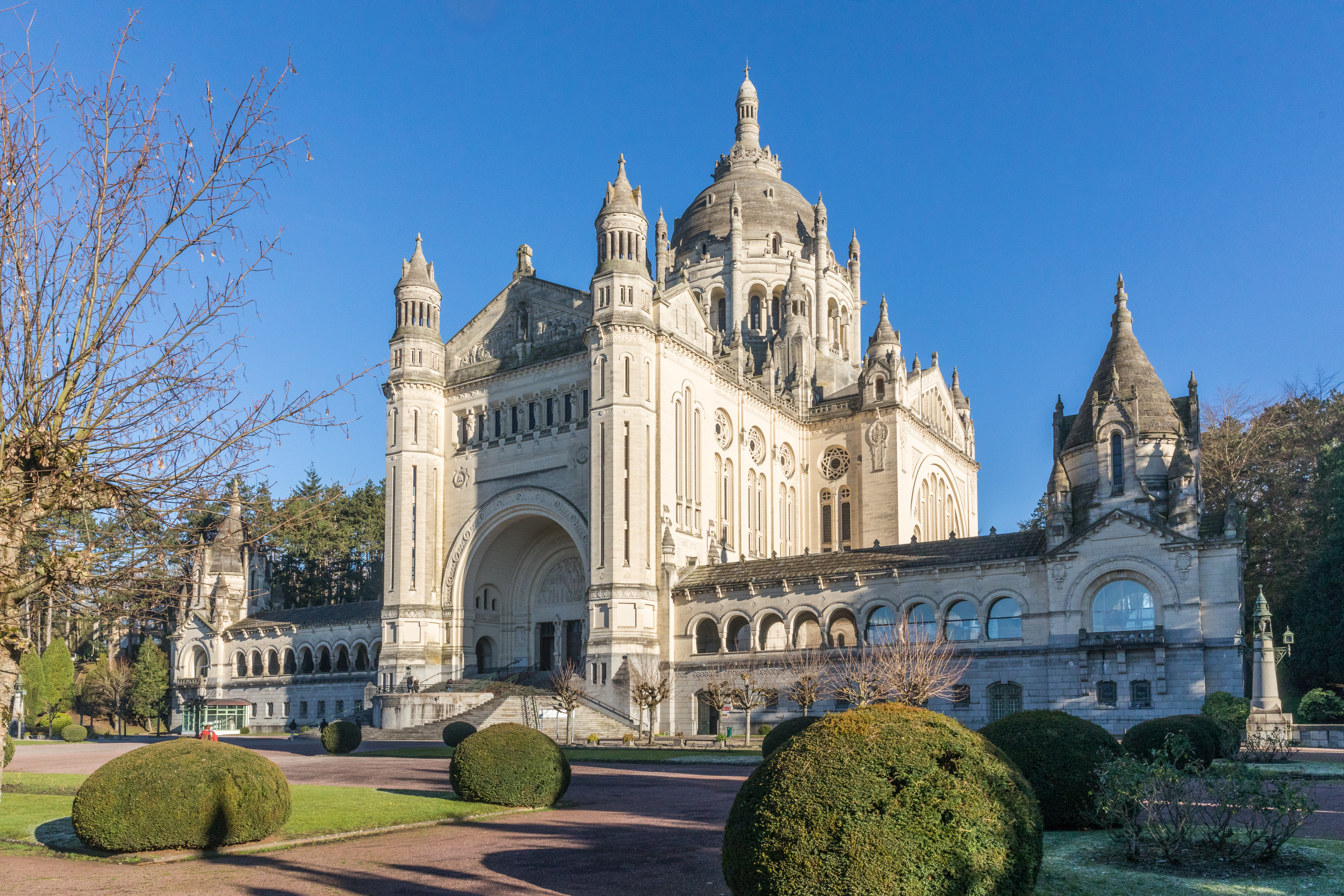
- Basilica of Sainte-Thérèse in Lisieux

Religion
- Affiliation: Catholic Church
- Ecclesiastical or organisational status: Minor basilica
- Year consecrated: 1951

Location
- Location: Lisieux, France
- Interactive map of Basilica of Sainte-Thérèse of Lisieux
- Coordinates: 49°8′22.56″N 0°14′11.04″E

Architecture
- Architects: Louis-Marie Cordonnier, Louis-Stanislas Cordonnier, Louis Cordonnier
- Type: Church
- Style: Neo-Byzantine
- Groundbreaking: 1929
- Completed: 1954

Specifications
- Capacity: 4000
- Length: 105 metres (344 ft)
- Width: 65 metres (213 ft)
- Height (max): 90 metres (300 ft)

Website
- https://www.therese-de-lisieux.catholique.fr/en/

The Basilica of Sainte-Thérèse of Lisieux (French: Basilique Sainte-Thérèse de Lisieux) is a Catholic church and minor basilica dedicated to Saint Thérèse of Lisieux. Located in Lisieux, France, the large basilica can accommodate 4,000 people and, with more than two million visitors a year, is the second largest pilgrimage site in France, after Lourdes. Pope John Paul II visited the Basilica on 2 June 1980.

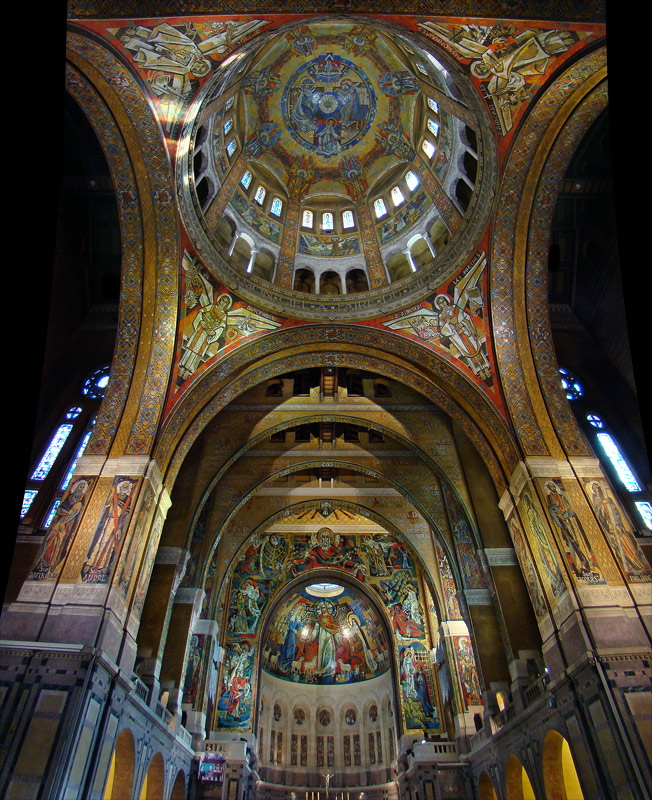
Interior of the Basilica

== History ==
Thérèse of Lisieux was beatified in 1923 and canonised in 1925. The Bishop of Bayeux and Lisieux, Thomas-Paul-Henri Lemonnier, decided to build a large basilica dedicated to her in the city where she lived and died. The project received the full support of Pope Pius XI, who had placed his pontificate under the sign of Saint Thérèse. Construction started in 1929 and was completed in 1954. The basilica is located on a hill at the city's southeastern edge. It was funded entirely by donations and special contributions from several countries worldwide, based on strong devotions to Saint Thérèse. The basilica thus contains 18 minor altars offered by different nations to Saint Thérèse.

The basilica was blessed on 11 July 1937 by the papal legate Cardinal Eugenio Pacelli (the future Pope Pius XII). Works stopped for some time due to the Second World War, but then resumed, and the basilica was completed in 1954. The basic structure, completed before the war, suffered minor damage during the bombing, which destroyed two-thirds of Lisieux. On 11 July 1951, the basilica was consecrated by Most Reverend, the Archbishop of Rouen Joseph-Marie Martin, with the Papal Legate, Cardinal Maurice Feltin.

== Interior ==
Three architects supervised the construction from father to son, Cordonnier – Louis Marie, and his son Louis-Stanislas Cordonnier and his grandson Louis Cordonnier. The Roman-Byzantine style of the basilica was inspired by the Sacred Heart Basilica in Paris. The building is shaped like a Latin cross, with a nave, choir and transept. An imposing dome surmounts the crossing. The internal volume is all in one piece, without collateral or ambulatory aisles. Due to the absence of columns, all who attend mass have an unobstructed view. Much of the basilica's interior is covered with mosaics. The basilica also has an unusually long reverberation time of over 11 seconds.

=== Crypt ===
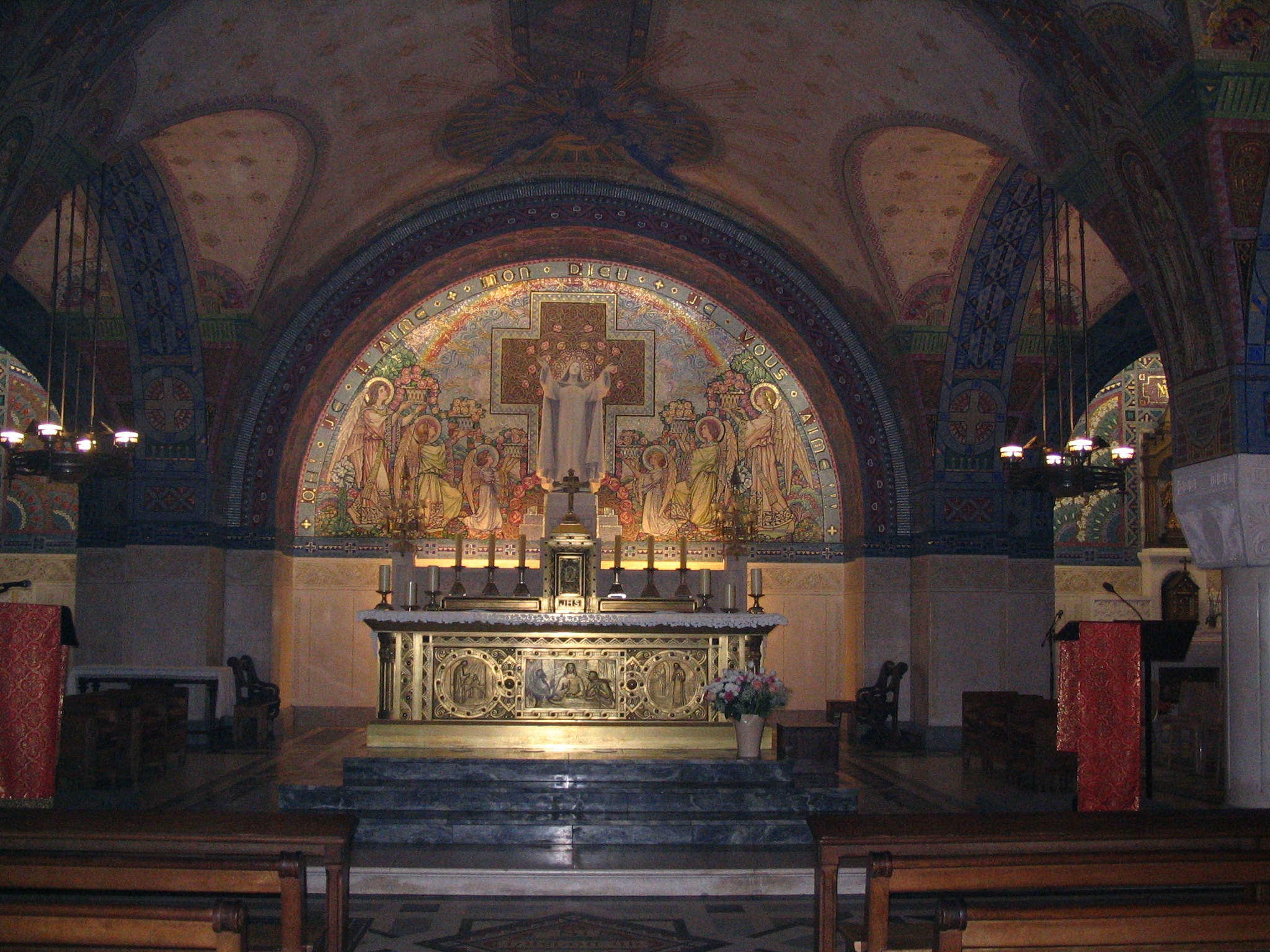
The crypt.

Completed in 1932, the crypt evokes the secret of the spiritual life of Saint Thérèse. It is decorated with marble and mosaics representing certain scenes from the life of Saint Thérèse: baptism, first communion, miraculous healing, commitment to religious life, death.

In the summer of 1944, the townspeople who remained in Lisieux took refuge in the basilica's crypt. The Carmelites of Lisieux, including Saint Thérèse's two surviving sisters, lived in the basilica's crypt that summer.

Built in 2000, the worship chapel is a place for silent prayer and can be entered through the crypt. The Irish ex-voto offered it to Saint Thérèse.

== Exterior ==
Built in the 1960s, the bell tower is separated from the main building and situated on the square. It was never completely finished; the priority has been given to charity. It contains 51 bells, or 6 to 45 and fly for carillon (all color). It gives concerts twice a day. Belgium and the Netherlands donated the bells in the ex-voto to Saint Thérèse.

=== Way of the cross ===
The area east of the apse houses a Way of the Cross and tombs which held the parents of Saint Thérèse, Saints Louis Martin and Marie-Azélie Guérin from 1958 through 2008. The causes for their beatification were introduced in 1957. For the first time in the history of the Church, the two causes were united into one by Pope Paul VI. Pope John Paul II declared them venerable in 1994, and Cardinal José Saraiva Martins, Papal Legate, announced their beatification in the Basilica of Saint Thérèse on Mission Sunday, 19 October 2008. They were canonized by Pope Francis on 18 October 2015.
