= Hôtel de Ville, La Madeleine =

Town hall in La Madeleine, Nord, France

Hôtel de Ville
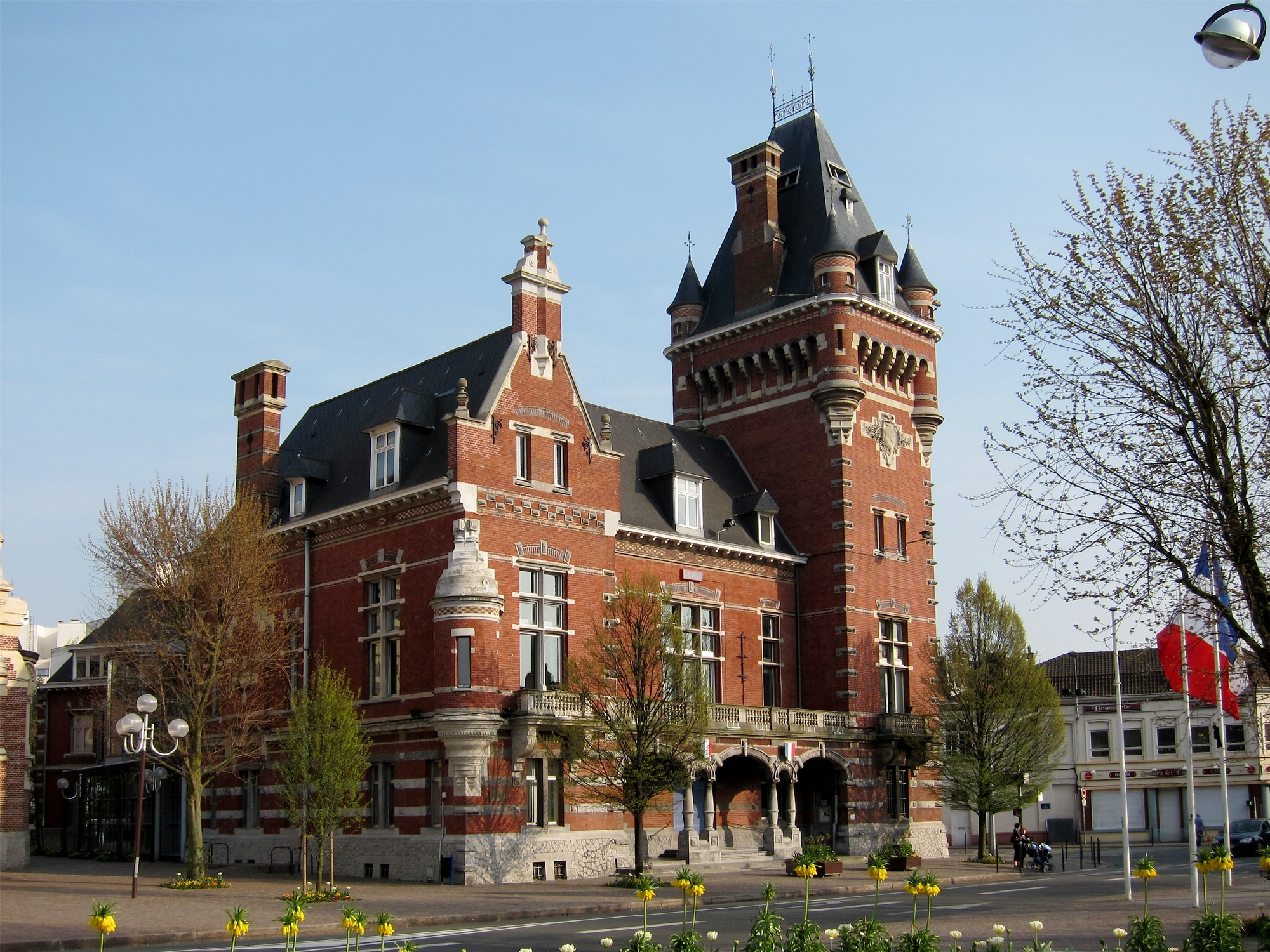
- The main frontage of the Hôtel de Ville in April 2010
- Interactive map of the Hôtel de Ville area

General information
- Type: City hall
- Architectural style: Flemish Renaissance Revival style
- Location: La Madeleine, France
- Coordinates: 50.6540°N 3.0739°E
- Completed: 1892

Design and construction
- Architect: Louis Marie Cordonnier

The Hôtel de Ville (French pronunciation: [otɛl də vil], City Hall) is a municipal building in La Madeleine, Nord, in northern France, standing on Rue du Général de Gaulle.

== History ==
Following the French Revolution, the new town council initially met in the house of the mayor at the time. However, in October 1886, following significant population growth, the council led by the mayor, Charles Crepelle-Fontaine, decided to seek proposals for a dedicated town hall. The site they selected, after much discussion, was adjacent to the Church of Sainte-Marie-Madeleine, which had been completed the previous year. The council selected a proposal submitted by the well-established architect, Louis Marie Cordonnier. The building was designed in the Flemish Renaissance Revival style, built in red brick with stone finishings and was officially opened in April 1892.

The design involved an asymmetric main frontage of five bays facing onto what is now Rue du Général de Gaulle. The left-hand bay was fenestrated by mullioned and transomed windows on the first two floors and by a pair of casement windows on the second floor with a stepped gable above. The central section of three bays, which was recessed, was arcaded on the ground floor; on the first floor, it was fenestrated by a large mullioned and transomed window, flanked by a pair of transomed windows with a balustraded balcony in front. The right-hand bay was formed by a five-stage tower with mullioned and transomed windows in the first two stages, a pair of casement windows in the third stage and the coat of arms of the town in the fourth stage. The fifth stage was decorated with machicolations at the bottom, a modillioned cornice at the top and bartizans at the corners, and was surmounted by a mansard roof with cresting. Internally, the principal room was the Salle du Conseil (council chamber). In the early 20th century, the building was extended to the rear in a similar style to provide accommodation for the civil registry.

After the Second World War, General Charles de Gaulle visited the town hall: he signed the guestbook and was declared an honorary citizen of the town in the council chamber on 13 February 1949.
