= List of city and town halls in France =

Many city and town hall buildings in France survive, of which some 450 of the more significant ones have been included on this list. The oldest town hall is Hôtel de Ville, La Rochelle completed in 1298, and the tallest town hall is Hôtel de Ville, Lille with a clock tower which rises to 104 metres (341 ft).

This list of city and town halls—compiled using the list of the largest cities and towns of France published by "About France" to ensure completeness— is sortable by building age and (in a few cases) height, and, where relevant, provides a link to the database of monuments historiques, which is a listing of buildings and structures important to France's architectural and historical cultural heritage.

Town or city	Building	Image	Department	Built	Height	Notes
Abbeville	Hôtel de Ville, Abbeville	More images	Somme	1960		Architect: Clément Tambuté.
Achères	Hôtel de Ville, Achères	More images	Yvelines	1995		
Agde	Hôtel de Ville, Agde	More images	Hérault	1892		
Agen	Hôtel de Ville, Agen	More images	Lot-et-Garonne	1666		
Aire-sur-la-Lys	Hôtel de Ville, Aire-sur-la-Lys	More images	Pas-de-Calais	1721	58 metres (190 ft)	Base Mérimée: PA00107942, French Ministry of Culture (in French). Architect: Jacques Héroguel.
Aix-en-Provence	Hôtel de Ville, Aix-en-Provence	More images	Bouches-du-Rhône	1668		Base Mérimée: PA00081058, French Ministry of Culture (in French). Architect: Pierre Pavillon.
Aix-les-Bains	Hôtel de Ville, Aix-les-Bains	More images	Savoie	1571		Base Mérimée: PA00118171, French Ministry of Culture (in French).
Ajaccio	Hôtel de Ville, Ajaccio	More images	Corse-du-Sud	1836		Base Mérimée: PA00099127, French Ministry of Culture (in French). Architect: Alphonse de Gisors.
Albi	Hôtel de Ville, Albi	More images	Tarn	1682		Base Mérimée: PA00095461, French Ministry of Culture (in French).
Alençon	Hôtel de Ville, Alençon	More images	Orne	1788		Base Mérimée: PA00110698, French Ministry of Culture (in French). Architect: Jean Delarue.
Alès	Hôtel de Ville, Alès	More images	Gard	1755		Base Mérimée: PA00102950, French Ministry of Culture (in French). Architect: Guillaume Rollin.
Alfortville	Hôtel de Ville, Alfortville	More images	Val-de-Marne	1887		Base Mérimée: IA00130068, French Ministry of Culture (in French). Architect: Jean-Baptiste Preux.
Amiens	Hôtel de Ville, Amiens	More images	Somme	1760		Base Mérimée: IA80000161, French Ministry of Culture (in French). Architects: Pierre-Louis Beffara and Jean-Jacques Jumel-Riquier.
Angers	Hôtel de Ville, Angers	More images	Maine-et-Loire	1823		Base Mérimée: IA49000849, French Ministry of Culture (in French). Architect: Adolphe Lenoir.
Anglet	Hôtel de Ville, Anglet	More images	Pyrénées-Atlantiques	1935		Base Mérimée: EA64000003, French Ministry of Culture (in French). Architect: William Marcel.
Angoulême	Hôtel de Ville, Angoulême	More images	Charente	1870		Base Mérimée: PA00104211, French Ministry of Culture (in French). Architect: Paul Abadie.
Annecy	Hôtel de Ville, Annecy	More images	Haute-Savoie	1851		Architect: François Justin.
Annemasse	Hôtel de Ville, Annemasse	More images	Haute-Savoie	1885		Architect: Émile Reverdin.
Antibes	Hôtel de Ville, Antibes	More images	Alpes-Maritimes	1828		Architect: Jacques Quine.
Antony	Hôtel de Ville, Antony	More images	Hauts-de-Seine	1970		Architect: Georges Félus.
Argenteuil	Hôtel de Ville, Argenteuil	More images	Val-d'Oise	1994		Architect: Eric Van Bellinghen.
Arles	Hôtel de Ville, Arles	More images	Bouches-du-Rhône	1676		Base Mérimée: PA00081155, French Ministry of Culture (in French). Architects: Jacques Peytret and Jules Hardouin-Mansart.
Armentières	Hôtel de Ville, Armentières	More images	Nord	1934	67 metres (220 ft)	Base Mérimée: PA59000085, French Ministry of Culture (in French). Architect: Louis Marie Cordonnier.
Arras	Hôtel de Ville, Arras	More images	Pas-de-Calais	1517	75 metres (246 ft)	Base Mérimée: PA00107978, French Ministry of Culture (in French). Architect: Pierre Paquet (reconstruction).
Asnières-sur-Seine	Hôtel de Ville, Asnières-sur-Seine	More images	Hauts-de-Seine	1899		Base Mérimée: IA00129701, French Ministry of Culture (in French). Architect: Emmanuel Garnier.
Athis-Mons	Hôtel de Ville, Athis-Mons	More images	Essonne	1893		Base Mérimée: IA91000463, French Ministry of Culture (in French). Architect: Jean Louis Henri Pucey.
Aubagne	Hôtel de Ville, Aubagne	More images	Bouches-du-Rhône	1828		
Aubervilliers	Hôtel de Ville, Aubervilliers	More images	Seine-Saint-Denis	1849		Architect: Jacques Paul Lequeux.
Auch	Hôtel de Ville, Auch	More images	Gers	1778		Base Mérimée: PA00094710, French Ministry of Culture (in French). Architects: François Picault and Albert du Limbeau.
Aulnay-sous-Bois	Hôtel de Ville, Aulnay-sous-Bois	More images	Seine-Saint-Denis	1934		Architect: Georges Levèque.
Aurillac	Hôtel de Ville, Aurillac	More images	Cantal	1806		Architect: Sieur Lallier.
Auxerre	Hôtel de Ville, Auxerre	More images	Yonne	1735		
Avignon	Hôtel de Ville, Avignon	More images	Vaucluse	1856		Base Mérimée: PA00081880, French Ministry of Culture (in French). Architects: Joseph-Auguste Joffroy and Léon Feuchère.
Bagneux	Hôtel de Ville, Bagneux	More images	Hauts-de-Seine	1959		
Bagnolet	Hôtel de Ville, Bagnolet	More images	Seine-Saint-Denis	1881		Architect: C. Monière.
Baie-Mahault	Hôtel de Ville, Baie-Mahault	More images	Guadeloupe	1991		Architect: Pierre Zobda.
Bailleul	Hôtel de Ville, Bailleul	More images	Nord	1932	62 metres (203 ft)	Base Mérimée: PA00107358, French Ministry of Culture (in French). Architect: Louis Marie Cordonnier.
Bastia	Hôtel de Ville, Bastia	More images	Haute-Corse	1965		
Bayonne	Hôtel de Ville, Bayonne	More images	Pyrénées-Atlantiques	1842		Architect: Nicolas Vionnois.
Beaune	Hôtel de Ville, Beaune	More images	Côte-d'Or	1700		Base Mérimée: PA00112106, French Ministry of Culture (in French). Architect: Jacques Guichard.
Beaupréau-en-Mauges	Hôtel de Ville, Beaupréau-en-Mauges	More images	Maine-et-Loire	1959		
Beauvais	Hôtel de Ville, Beauvais	More images	Oise	1757		Base Mérimée: PA00114509, French Ministry of Culture (in French). Architect: Suier Bayeux.
Belfort	Hôtel de Ville, Belfort	More images	Territoire de Belfort	1724		Base Mérimée: PA00101139, French Ministry of Culture (in French). Architect: Jean-Baptiste Kléber.
Benfeld	Hôtel de Ville, Benfeld	More images	Bas-Rhin	1619		Base Mérimée: PA00084605, French Ministry of Culture (in French). Architect: Ascagne Albertini.
Bergerac	Hôtel de Ville, Bergerac	More images	Dordogne	1795		
Besançon	Hôtel de Ville, Besançon	More images	Doubs	1573		Base Mérimée: PA00101510, French Ministry of Culture (in French). Architect: Richard Maire.
Béthune	Hôtel de Ville, Béthune	More images	Pas-de-Calais	1929	45 metres (148 ft)	Base Mérimée: PA62000040, French Ministry of Culture (in French). Architect: Jacques Alleman.
Béziers	Hôtel de Ville, Béziers	More images	Hérault	1746		Base Mérimée: PA00103383, French Ministry of Culture (in French). Architect: Sieur Cadas.
Bezons	Hôtel de Ville, Bezons	More images	Val-d'Oise	2015		Architects: Emmanuel Combarel Dominique Marrec Architectes (ECDM).
Biarritz	Hôtel de Ville, Biarritz	More images	Pyrénées-Atlantiques	1929		Architects: Louis-Hippolyte Boileau and Paul Perrotte.
Blagnac	Hôtel de Ville, Blagnac	More images	Haute-Garonne	1992		Architects: G. P. A.
Blois	Hôtel de Ville, Blois	More images	Loir-et-Cher	1704		Base Mérimée: PA00098346, French Ministry of Culture (in French). Architect: Jacques Gabriel.
Bobigny	Hôtel de Ville, Bobigny	More images	Seine-Saint-Denis	1974		Architect: Marius Depont.
Bois-Colombes	Hôtel de Ville, Bois-Colombes	More images	Hauts-de-Seine	1937	57 metres (187 ft)	Base Mérimée: IA00079391, French Ministry of Culture (in French). Architects: Émile Berthelot and Georges Bovet.
Bois-Guillaume	Hôtel de Ville, Bois-Guillaume	More images	Seine-Maritime	1887		Architect: Louis Loisel.
Bondy	Hôtel de Ville, Bondy	More images	Seine-Saint-Denis	1969		Architects: René Roux-Dufort and Noël Laval.
Bordeaux	Palais Rohan	More images	Gironde	1778		Base Mérimée: PA00083157, French Ministry of Culture (in French). Architects: Joseph Étienne and Richard-François Bonfin.
Boulogne-Billancourt	Hôtel de Ville, Boulogne-Billancourt	More images	Hauts-de-Seine	1934		Base Mérimée: PA00088077, French Ministry of Culture (in French). Architects: Tony Garnier and Jacques Debat-Ponsan.
Boulogne-sur-Mer	Hôtel de Ville, Boulogne-sur-Mer	More images	Pas-de-Calais	1736		Base Mérimée: IA00059443, French Ministry of Culture (in French). Architect: Etienne Martinet.
Bourg-en-Bresse	Hôtel de Ville, Bourg-en-Bresse	More images	Ain	1771		Base Mérimée: PA00116324, French Ministry of Culture (in French).
Bourges	Hôtel de Ville, Bourges	More images	Cher	1992		Architects: Claude Vasconi and Jean-Paul Chazelle.
Bourg-la-Reine	Hôtel de Ville, Bourg-la-Reine	More images	Hauts-de-Seine	1845		Base Mérimée: IA00117398, French Ministry of Culture (in French). Architect: Claude Naissant.
Bourgoin-Jallieu	Hôtel de Ville, Bourgoin-Jallieu	More images	Isère	1870		
Brest	Hôtel de Ville, Brest	More images	Finistère	1961		Architect: Maurice Léon Génin.
Brétigny-sur-Orge	Hôtel de Ville, Brétigny-sur-Orge	More images	Essonne	1864		Architect: Sieur Richard.
Brive-la-Gaillarde	Hôtel de Ville, Brive-la-Gaillarde	More images	Corrèze	1671		Base Mérimée: PA00099690, French Ministry of Culture (in French).
Bron	Hôtel de Ville, Bron	More images	Metropolis of Lyon	1958		Architect: Pierre Fonterme.
Bruay-la-Buissière	Hôtel de Ville, Bruay-la-Buissière	More images	Pas-de-Calais	1931	47 metres (154 ft)	Base Mérimée: PA62000007, French Ministry of Culture (in French). Architects: René and Paul Hanote.
Bruges	Hôtel de Ville, Bruges	More images	Gironde	1992		Architects: Patrick Baggio and Anne Piechaud.
Brunoy	Hôtel de Ville, Brunoy	More images	Essonne	1898		Architect: Sieur Breasson.
Bussy-Saint-Georges	Hôtel de Ville, Bussy-Saint-Georges	More images	Seine-et-Marne	1850		
Cachan	Hôtel de Ville, Cachan	More images	Val-de-Marne	1935		Base Mérimée: PA94000015, French Ministry of Culture (in French). Architects: Jean-Baptiste Mathon, Joannès Chollet and René Chaussat.
Caen	Hôtel de Ville, Caen	More images	Calvados	1726		Architect: Guillaume de la Tremblaye.
Cagnes-sur-Mer	Hôtel de Ville, Cagnes-sur-Mer	More images	Alpes-Maritimes	1908		
Cahors	Hôtel de Ville, Cahors	More images	Lot	1840		Base Mérimée: PA00095003, French Ministry of Culture (in French). Architect: Charles Hector Malo.
Calais	Hôtel de Ville, Calais	More images	Pas-de-Calais	1923	72 metres (236 ft)	Base Mérimée: PA62000055, French Ministry of Culture (in French). Architect: Louis Debrouwer.
Caluire-et-Cuire	Hôtel de Ville, Caluire-et-Cuire	More images	Metropolis of Lyon	1846	20 metres (66 ft)	Base Mérimée: PA00117728, French Ministry of Culture (in French). Architect: Brother Pasquier.
Cambrai	Hôtel de Ville, Cambrai	More images	Nord	1786		Architect: Jacques Denis Antoine.
Cannes	Hôtel de Ville, Cannes	More images	Alpes-Maritimes	1876		Base Mérimée: IA06000102, French Ministry of Culture (in French). Architect: Louis Hourlier.
Carcassonne	Hôtel de Rolland	More images	Aude	1761		Base Mérimée: PA00102601, French Ministry of Culture (in French). Architect: Guillaume Rollin.
Carpentras	Hôtel de Ville, Carpentras	More images	Vaucluse	1740		Base Mérimée: IA84000621, French Ministry of Culture (in French).
Carquefou	Hôtel de Ville, Carquefou	More images	Loire-Atlantique	1986		
Castelnau-le-Lez	Hôtel de Ville, Castelnau-le-Lez	More images	Hérault	1972		Architect: Henri Puech.
Castres	Hôtel de Ville, Castres	More images	Tarn	1673		Base Mérimée: PA00095519, French Ministry of Culture (in French). Architect: Jules Hardouin-Mansart.
Cavaillon	Hôtel de Ville, Cavaillon	More images	Vaucluse	1753		Base Mérimée: IA84000519, French Ministry of Culture (in French). Architect: Joseph-Abel Mottard.
Cayenne	Hôtel de Ville, Cayenne	More images	French Guiana	1924		Base Mérimée: IA97300241, French Ministry of Culture (in French).
Cenon	Hôtel de Ville, Cenon	More images	Gironde	1824		
Cergy	Hôtel de Ville, Cergy	More images	Val-d'Oise	1990		Architects: Dominique Armand and Thierry Melot.
Challans	Hôtel de Ville, Challans	More images	Vendée	2006		Architects: Architectures – Chabanne et Scott.
Châlons-en-Champagne	Hôtel de Ville, Châlons-en-Champagne	More images	Marne	1776		Base Mérimée: PA00078623, French Ministry of Culture (in French). Architect: Jean-Nicolas-Louis Durand.
Chalon-sur-Saône	Hôtel de Ville, Chalon-sur-Saône	More images	Saône-et-Loire	1845		Architect: Eugène Piot.
Chambéry	Hôtel de Ville, Chambéry	More images	Savoie	1867		Architects: Charles-Bernard Pellegrini and Joseph Samuel Revel.
Champigny-sur-Marne	Hôtel de Ville, Champigny-sur-Marne	More images	Val-de-Marne	1931		Architects: Julien Heulot.
Champs-sur-Marne	Hôtel de Ville, Champs-sur-Marne	More images	Seine-et-Marne	2002		Architects: Cabinet ATE.
Charenton-le-Pont	Hôtel de Ville, Charenton-le-Pont	More images	Val-de-Marne	1612		Base Mérimée: PA00079861, French Ministry of Culture (in French).
Charleville-Mézières	Hôtel de Ville, Charleville-Mézières	More images	Ardennes	1933		Base Mérimée: PA08000021, French Ministry of Culture (in French). Architects: Marie Eugène Chifflot and Robert Colle.
Chartres	Hôtel de Ville, Chartres	More images	Eure-et-Loir	1614		Base Mérimée: PA00097002, French Ministry of Culture (in French).
Châteauroux	Hôtel de Ville, Châteauroux	More images	Indre	1977		Architects: Pierre Bouguin, Gisèle Fiaud, Jean Maret, and Marc Mogenet.
Châtellerault	Hôtel de Ville, Châtellerault	More images	Vienne	1850		Architect: Jacques Dulin.
Châtenay-Malabry	Hôtel de Ville, Châtenay-Malabry	More images	Hauts-de-Seine	1977		
Châtillon	Hôtel de Ville, Châtillon	More images	Hauts-de-Seine	1851		Base Mérimée: IA92000131, French Ministry of Culture (in French). Architect: Claude Naissant.
Chatou	Hôtel de Ville, Chatou	More images	Yvelines	1730		Base Mérimée: IA00027737, French Ministry of Culture (in French).
Chaumont	Hôtel de Ville, Chaumont	More images	Haute-Marne	1790		Base Mérimée: PA00079019, French Ministry of Culture (in French). Architect: François-Nicolas Lancret.
Chaville	Hôtel de Ville, Chaville	More images	Hauts-de-Seine	1814		Base Mérimée: IA00051372, French Ministry of Culture (in French).
Chelles	Hôtel de Ville, Chelles	More images	Seine-et-Marne	1850		
Cherbourg	Hôtel de Ville, Cherbourg	More images	Manche	1804		Base Mérimée: PA50000028, French Ministry of Culture (in French).
Chilly-Mazarin	Hôtel de Ville, Chilly-Mazarin	More images	Essonne	1825		
Choisy-le-Roi	Hôtel de Ville, Choisy-le-Roi	More images	Val-de-Marne	1988		Architect: Pierre Soria.
Cholet	Hôtel de Ville, Cholet	More images	Maine-et-Loire	1976		Architect: Francis Pierrès.
Clamart	Hôtel de Ville, Clamart	More images	Hauts-de-Seine	1878		Base Mérimée: PA00088094, French Ministry of Culture (in French).
Clermont-Ferrand	Hôtel de Ville, Clermont-Ferrand	More images	Puy-de-Dôme	1844		Architect: Louis-Charles-François Ledru.
Clichy	Hôtel de Ville, Clichy	More images	Hauts-de-Seine	1878		Base Mérimée: IA00125154, French Ministry of Culture (in French). Architect: Jules Depoix.
Clichy-sous-Bois	Hôtel de Ville, Clichy-sous-Bois	More images	Seine-Saint-Denis	1645		Base Mérimée: PA00079931, French Ministry of Culture (in French).
Colmar	Hôtel de Ville, Colmar	More images	Haut-Rhin	1782		Base Mérimée: PA00085373, French Ministry of Culture (in French). Architect: Gabriel Ignace Ritter.
Colombes	Hôtel de Ville, Colombes	More images	Hauts-de-Seine	1923		Base Mérimée: IA00079345, French Ministry of Culture (in French). Architect: Paul and Albert Leseine.
Colomiers	Hôtel de Ville, Colomiers	More images	Haute-Garonne	1991		
Combs-la-Ville	Hôtel de Ville, Combs-la-Ville	More images	Seine-et-Marne	1809		
Comines	Hôtel de Ville, Comines	More images	Nord	1932	52 metres (171 ft)	Base Mérimée: PA59000068, French Ministry of Culture (in French). Architect: Louis Marie Cordonnier.
Compiègne	Hôtel de Ville, Compiègne	More images	Oise	1530		Base Mérimée: PA00114622, French Ministry of Culture (in French). Architect: Pierre Navyer (known as Pierre de Meaux).
Conflans-Sainte-Honorine	Hôtel de Ville, Conflans-Sainte-Honorine	More images	Yvelines	1895		Base Mérimée: IA78000988, French Ministry of Culture (in French). Architect: Théophile Bourgeois.
Corbeil-Essonnes	Hôtel de Ville, Corbeil-Essonnes	More images	Essonne	1906		Architect: François Louis Tavernier.
Cormeilles-en-Parisis	Hôtel de Ville, Cormeilles-en-Parisis	More images	Val-d'Oise	1983		
Coudekerque-Branche	Hôtel de Ville, Coudekerque-Branche	More images	Nord	1980		
Couëron	Hôtel de Ville, Couëron	More images	Loire-Atlantique	1889		
Courbevoie	Hôtel de Ville, Courbevoie	More images	Hauts-de-Seine	1858		Base Mérimée: PA00088104, French Ministry of Culture (in French). Architect: Paul-Eugène Lequeux.
Cournon-d'Auvergne	Hôtel de Ville, Cournon-d'Auvergne	More images	Puy-de-Dôme	1660		
Creil	Hôtel de Ville, Creil	More images	Oise	1903		Architect: Paul Heneux.
Créteil	Hôtel de Ville, Créteil	More images	Val-de-Marne	1974	75 metres (246 ft)	Architect: Pierre Dufau.
Dammarie-lès-Lys	Hôtel de Ville, Dammarie-lès-Lys	More images	Seine-et-Marne	1850		
Dax	Hôtel de Ville, Dax	More images	Landes	1790		
Décines-Charpieu	Hôtel de Ville, Décines-Charpieu	More images	Metropolis of Lyon	1932		Architect: André Teissier.
Denain	Hôtel de Ville, Denain	More images	Nord	1980		
Deuil-la-Barre	Hôtel de Ville, Deuil-la-Barre	More images	Val-d'Oise	1935		Architect: Louis Ponsin.
Dieppe	Hôtel de Ville, Dieppe	More images	Seine-Maritime	1966		Architects: René Coulon and Jean-Louis Ludinard.
Dijon	Hôtel de Ville, Dijon	More images	Côte-d'Or	1689	46 metres (151 ft)	Base Mérimée: PA00112427, French Ministry of Culture (in French). Architect: Jules Hardouin-Mansart.
Dole	Hôtel de Ville, Dole	More images	Jura	1988		Architect: Roger Longchamp.
Douai	Hôtel de Ville, Douai	More images	Nord	1410	46 metres (151 ft)	Base Mérimée: PA00107461, French Ministry of Culture (in French).
Doullens	Hôtel de Ville, Doullens	More images	Somme	1898		Base Mérimée: PA80000003, French Ministry of Culture (in French). Architect: Anatole Bienaimé.
Draguignan	Hôtel de Ville, Draguignan	More images	Var	1791		
Drancy	Hôtel de Ville, Drancy	More images	Seine-Saint-Denis	1859		
Draveil	Hôtel de Ville, Draveil	More images	Essonne	1781		Base Mérimée: PA00087888, French Ministry of Culture (in French).
Dreux	Hôtel de Ville, Dreux	More images	Eure-et-Loir	1886		
Dunkirk	Hôtel de Ville, Dunkirk	More images	Nord	1901	75 metres (246 ft)	Base Mérimée: PA00107900, French Ministry of Culture (in French). Architect: Louis Marie Cordonnier.
Eaubonne	Hôtel de Ville, Eaubonne	More images	Val-d'Oise	1976		
Échirolles	Hôtel de Ville, Échirolles	More images	Isère	2006		Architects: Arcane Architectes.
Élancourt	Hôtel de Ville, Élancourt	More images	Yvelines	1978		Architects: Jacques Kalisz, Roger Salem and François Droucot.
Épernay	Hôtel de Ville, Épernay	More images	Marne	1858		Base Mérimée: PA51000018, French Ministry of Culture (in French). Architect: Victor Lenoir.
Épinal	Hôtel de Ville, Épinal	More images	Vosges	1757		
Épinay-sur-Seine	Hôtel de Ville, Épinay-sur-Seine	More images	Seine-Saint-Denis	1760		Base Mérimée: PA00079933, French Ministry of Culture (in French).
Ermont	Hôtel de Ville, Ermont	More images	Val-d'Oise	1868		
Étampes	Hôtel de Ville, Étampes	More images	Essonne	1853		Base Mérimée: PA00087899, French Ministry of Culture (in French). Architects: Pierre and Auguste Magne.
Évreux	Hôtel de Ville, Évreux	More images	Eure	1895		Architect: François Thierry-Ladrange.
Évry-Courcouronnes	Hôtel de Ville, Évry-Courcouronnes	More images	Essonne	1991		Architect: Jacques Lévy.
Eysines	Hôtel de Ville, Eysines	More images	Gironde	1964		Architect: Louis Bauret.
Fleury-les-Aubrais	Hôtel de Ville, Fleury-les-Aubrais	More images	Loiret	1928		Architect: Constant Coursimault.
Fontaine	Hôtel de Ville, Fontaine	More images	Isère	1972		
Fontenay-aux-Roses	Hôtel de Ville, Fontenay-aux-Roses	More images	Hauts-de-Seine	1860		Base Mérimée: IA00119078, French Ministry of Culture (in French). Architect: Claude Naissant.
Fontenay-sous-Bois	Hôtel de Ville, Fontenay-sous-Bois	More images	Val-de-Marne	1973		Architect: Henri Beauclair.
Forbach	Hôtel de Ville, Forbach	More images	Moselle	1974		Architects: Roland Flageul and Guy Bourdon.
Fort-de-France	Hôtel de Ville, Fort-de-France	More images	Martinique	1901		Base Mérimée: PA00105944, French Ministry of Culture (in French). Architects: Sieur Krous and Sieur De Laguarigue.
Fougères	Hôtel de Ville, Fougères	More images	Ille-et-Vilaine	1535		
Franconville	Hôtel de Ville, Franconville	More images	Val-d'Oise	1968		
Fréjus	Hôtel de Ville, Fréjus	More images	Var	1825		Base Mérimée: IA83000738, French Ministry of Culture (in French); Architect: Esprit Lantoin.
Fresnes	Hôtel de Ville, Fresnes	More images	Val-de-Marne	1887		Base Mérimée: IA94000081, French Ministry of Culture (in French); Architect: Léon Dubreuil.
Frontignan	Hôtel de Ville, Frontignan	More images	Hérault	1896		Architect: Dieudonné Deschanels.
Gagny	Hôtel de Ville, Gagny	More images	Seine-Saint-Denis	1715		
Gap	Hôtel de Ville, Gap	More images	Hautes-Alpes	1743		Architect: Sieur Lechat.
Gardanne	Hôtel de Ville, Gardanne	More images	Bouches-du-Rhône	1907		
Garges-lès-Gonesse	Hôtel de Ville, Garges-lès-Gonesse	More images	Val-d'Oise	1975		Architects: Pierre-Paul Heckly and Jack Moulin.
Gennevilliers	Hôtel de Ville, Gennevilliers	More images	Hauts-de-Seine	1977	66 metres (217 ft)	Architect: Georges Auzolle.
Gif-sur-Yvette	Hôtel de Ville, Gif-sur-Yvette	More images	Essonne	1835		
Givors	Hôtel de Ville, Givors	More images	Metropolis of Lyon	1860		Architect: Pierre Bernard.
Gonesse	Hôtel de Ville, Gonesse	More images	Val-d'Oise	1900		Base Mérimée: IA95000077, French Ministry of Culture (in French). Architect: Sieur Frappart.
Goussainville	Hôtel de Ville, Goussainville	More images	Val-d'Oise	1995		
Gradignan	Hôtel de Ville, Gradignan	More images	Gironde	1752		
Grande-Synthe	Hôtel de Ville, Grande-Synthe	More images	Nord	1978		
Grasse	Hôtel de Ville, Grasse	More images	Alpes-Maritimes	1790		Base Mérimée: PA00080740, French Ministry of Culture (in French).
Grenoble	Hôtel de Ville, Grenoble	More images	Isère	1967	46.5 metres (153 ft)	Base Mérimée: PA38000046, French Ministry of Culture (in French). Architect: Maurice Novarina.
Grigny	Hôtel de Ville, Grigny	More images	Essonne	1974		
Gujan-Mestras	Hôtel de Ville, Gujan-Mestras	More images	Gironde	1931		
Guyancourt	Hôtel de Ville, Guyancourt	More images	Yvelines	1995		Architect: Edmond Bonnefoy.
Haguenau	Hôtel de Ville, Haguenau	More images	Bas-Rhin	1910		
Halluin	Hôtel de Ville, Halluin	More images	Nord	1890		
Hazebrouck	Hôtel de Ville, Hazebrouck	More images	Nord	1820		Architect: Sieur Drapier.
Hénin-Beaumont	Hôtel de Ville, Hénin-Beaumont	More images	Pas-de-Calais	1925		Architect: André Dufau.
Hérouville-Saint-Clair	Hôtel de Ville, Hérouville-Saint-Clair	More images	Calvados	1987		Architect: Eugène Leseney.
Hesdin	Hôtel de Ville, Hesdin	More images	Pas-de-Calais	1629	70 metres (230 ft)	Base Mérimée: PA00108312, French Ministry of Culture (in French). Architect: Dom Ponte del Brya.
Houilles	Hôtel de Ville, Houilles	More images	Yvelines	1905		
Hyères	Hôtel de Ville, Hyères	More images	Var	1864		
Illkirch-Graffenstaden	Hôtel de Ville, Illkirch-Graffenstaden	More images	Bas-Rhin	1882		Architect: Jacques Albert Brion.
Issy-les-Moulineaux	Hôtel de Ville, Issy-les-Moulineaux	More images	Hauts-de-Seine	1895		Architect: Louis Bonnier.
Ivry-sur-Seine	Hôtel de Ville, Ivry-sur-Seine	More images	Val-de-Marne	1896		Base Mérimée: IA00130031, French Ministry of Culture (in French). Architect: Chancel Adrien.
Joinville-le-Pont	Hôtel de Ville, Joinville-le-Pont	More images	Val-de-Marne	1976		Architects: Robert and Gilbert Picquenard.
Joué-lès-Tours	Hôtel de Ville, Joué-lès-Tours	More images	Indre-et-Loire	1976		Architect: André Remondet.
Kourou	Hôtel de Ville, Kourou	More images	French Guiana	1979		
La Celle-Saint-Cloud	Hôtel de Ville, La Celle-Saint-Cloud	More images	Yvelines	1971		
La Chapelle-sur-Erdre	Hôtel de Ville, La Chapelle-sur-Erdre	More images	Loire-Atlantique	1840		
La Ciotat	Hôtel de Ville, La Ciotat	More images	Bouches-du-Rhône	1978		Base Mérimée: IA13005848, French Ministry of Culture (in French).
La Courneuve	Hôtel de Ville, La Courneuve	More images	Seine-Saint-Denis	1921	30 metres (98 ft)	Architect: Pierre Mathieu.
La Garde	Hôtel de Ville, La Garde	More images	Var	1884		Architect: Sieur Barthélémy.
La Garenne-Colombes	Hôtel de Ville, La Garenne-Colombes	More images	Hauts-de-Seine	1971		Architects: Jacques Morel and Michel Homberg.
Lagny-sur-Marne	Hôtel de Ville, Lagny-sur-Marne	More images	Seine-et-Marne	1965		Base Mérimée: PA00087043, French Ministry of Culture (in French).
La Madeleine	Hôtel de Ville, La Madeleine	More images	Nord	1892		Architect: Louis Marie Cordonnier.
Lanester	Hôtel de Ville, Lanester	More images	Morbihan	1992		Architect: Jacques David-Lena.
Lannion	Hôtel de Ville, Lannion	More images	Côtes-d'Armor	1886		
Laon	Hôtel de Ville, Laon	More images	Aisne	1838		Architect: Jean Charles Bringol.
La Possession	Hôtel de Ville, La Possession	More images	Réunion	1967		
La Rochelle	Hôtel de Ville, La Rochelle	More images	Charente-Maritime	1298		Base Mérimée: PA00104890, French Ministry of Culture (in French).
La Roche-sur-Yon	Hôtel de Ville, La Roche-sur-Yon	More images	Vendée	2025		Architects: Richez Associés.
La Seyne-sur-Mer	Hôtel de Ville, La Seyne-sur-Mer	More images	Var	1959		Architect: Jean de Mailly.
La Teste-de-Buch	Hôtel de Ville, La Teste-de-Buch	More images	Gironde	1680		
Laval	Hôtel de Ville, Laval	More images	Mayenne	1831		Base Mérimée: IA53000005, French Ministry of Culture (in French). Architect: Alphonse de Gisors.
La Valette-du-Var	Hôtel de Ville, La Valette-du-Var	More images	Var	1993		
Le Blanc-Mesnil	Hôtel de Ville, Le Blanc-Mesnil	More images	Seine-Saint-Denis	1967		Architect: André Lurçat.
Le Bouscat	Hôtel de Ville, Le Bouscat	More images	Gironde	1878		
Le Cannet	Hôtel de Ville, Le Cannet	More images	Alpes-Maritimes	1902		Architect: James Warnery.
Le Chesnay	Hôtel de Ville, Le Chesnay	More images	Yvelines	1980		
Le Creusot	Hôtel de Ville, Le Creusot	More images	Saône-et-Loire	1901		Base Mérimée: IA71000194, French Ministry of Culture (in French). Architect: Louis Legrand.
Le Gosier	Hôtel de Ville, Le Gosier	More images	Guadeloupe	1931		Architect: Ali Tur.
Le Grand-Quevilly	Hôtel de Ville, Le Grand-Quevilly	More images	Seine-Maritime	1974		Architect: Henri Tougard.
Le Havre	Hôtel de Ville, Le Havre	More images	Seine-Maritime	1958	70 metres (230 ft)	Base Mérimée: PA76000103, French Ministry of Culture (in French). Architect: Auguste Perret.
Le Kremlin-Bicêtre	Hôtel de Ville, Le Kremlin-Bicêtre	More images	Val-de-Marne	1903		Base Mérimée: IA94000304, French Ministry of Culture (in French). Architect: Henri Rebersat.
Le Mans	Hôtel de Ville, Le Mans	More images	Seine-Maritime	1764		Base Mérimée: PA00109801, French Ministry of Culture (in French).
Le Mée-sur-Seine	Hôtel de Ville, Le Mée-sur-Seine	More images	Seine-et-Marne	1959		
Le Moule	Hôtel de Ville, Le Moule	More images	Guadeloupe	1928		Architect: Georges Lecardez.
Lens	Hôtel de Ville, Lens	More images	Pas-de-Calais	1965	28 metres (92 ft)	Architect: Jean de Mailly.
Le Perreux-sur-Marne	Hôtel de Ville, Le Perreux-sur-Marne	More images	Val-de-Marne	1891		Base Mérimée: IA00050850, French Ministry of Culture (in French). Architect: Pierre Mathieu.
Le Petit-Quevilly	Hôtel de Ville, Le Petit-Quevilly	More images	Seine-Maritime	1846		Architect: Sieur Maillard.
Le Plessis-Robinson	Hôtel de Ville, Le Plessis-Robinson	More images	Hauts-de-Seine	1412		Base Mérimée: IA00076288, French Ministry of Culture (in French).
Le Plessis-Trévise	Hôtel de Ville, Le Plessis-Trévise	More images	Val-de-Marne	1866		Base Mérimée: IA00028166, French Ministry of Culture (in French).
Le Robert	Hôtel de Ville, Le Robert	More images	Martinique	1933		
Les Abymes	Hôtel de Ville, Les Abymes	More images	Guadeloupe	1986		
Les Lilas	Hôtel de Ville, Les Lilas	More images	Seine-Saint-Denis	1950		Architect: Paul Héneux.
Les Mureaux	Hôtel de Ville, Les Mureaux	More images	Yvelines	1962		Architect: André Bruyère.
Les Pavillons-sous-Bois	Hôtel de Ville, Les Pavillons-sous-Bois	More images	Seine-Saint-Denis	1969		
Les Sables-d'Olonne	Hôtel de Ville, Les Sables-d'Olonne	More images	Vendée	1715		
Les Ulis	Hôtel de Ville, Les Ulis	More images	Essonne	1976		Architects: Robert Camelot, Jean-Claude Finelli and Michel Hennuyer.
Le Tampon	Hôtel de Ville, Le Tampon	More images	Réunion	1965		Architects: Jean Hébrard et Paul Abadie.
Levallois-Perret	Hôtel de Ville, Levallois-Perret	More images	Hauts-de-Seine	1898	51 metres (167 ft)	Base Mérimée: IA00126374, French Ministry of Culture (in French). Architect: Léon Jamin.
L'Haÿ-les-Roses	Hôtel de Ville, L'Haÿ-les-Roses	More images	Val-de-Marne	2004		Base Mérimée: IA94000111, French Ministry of Culture (in French). Architects: François and Pierre Lombard.
Libourne	Hôtel de Ville, Libourne	More images	Gironde	1427		Base Mérimée: PA00083597, French Ministry of Culture (in French).
Liévin	Hôtel de Ville, Liévin	More images	Pas-de-Calais	1926	30 metres (98 ft)	Architect: Jean Goniaux.
Lille	Hôtel de Ville, Lille	More images	Nord	1932	104 metres (341 ft)	Tallest municipal building in France. Base Mérimée: PA59000078, French Ministry of Culture (in French). Architect: Émile Dubuisson.
Limeil-Brévannes	Hôtel de Ville, Limeil-Brévannes	More images	Val-de-Marne	1972		
Limoges	Hôtel de Ville, Limoges	More images	Haute-Vienne	1883	43 metres (141 ft)	Base Mérimée: PA00100361, French Ministry of Culture (in French). Architect: Charles-Alfred Leclerc.
Lingolsheim	Hôtel de Ville, Lingolsheim	More images	Bas-Rhin	1907		Architect: Gustave Oberthür.
Lisieux	Hôtel de Ville, Lisieux	More images	Calvados	1713		Base Mérimée: PA00111475, French Ministry of Culture (in French).
L'Isle-sur-la-Sorgue	Hôtel de Ville, L'Isle-sur-la-Sorgue	More images	Vaucluse	1839		Architect: Jean-Jacques Delpuech.
Livry-Gargan	Hôtel de Ville, Livry-Gargan	More images	Seine-Saint-Denis	1900		
Longjumeau	Hôtel de Ville, Longjumeau	More images	Essonne	1997		
Loos	Hôtel de Ville, Loos	More images	Nord	1884	38 metres (125 ft)	Base Mérimée: PA59000070, French Ministry of Culture (in French). Architect: Louis Marie Cordonnier.
Lorient	Hôtel de Ville, Lorient	More images	Morbihan	1960		Architect: Jean-Baptiste Hourlier.
Lormont	Hôtel de Ville, Lormont	More images	Gironde	1888		
Lunel	Hôtel de Ville, Lunel	More images	Hérault	1950		
Lyon	Hôtel de Ville, Lyon	More images	Metropolis of Lyon	1652		Base Mérimée: PA00117820, French Ministry of Culture (in French). Architect: Simon Maupin.
Mâcon	Hôtel de Ville, Mâcon	More images	Saône-et-Loire	1751		Base Mérimée: PA00113327, French Ministry of Culture (in French).
Maisons-Alfort	Hôtel de Ville, Maisons-Alfort	More images	Val-de-Marne	1896		Base Mérimée: IA00070794, French Ministry of Culture (in French). Architect: Georges Guyon.
Maisons-Laffitte	Hôtel de Ville, Maisons-Laffitte	More images	Yvelines	1891		Architect: Louis Dauvergne.
Malakoff	Hôtel de Ville, Malakoff	More images	Hauts-de-Seine	1976		
Mamoudzou	Hôtel de Ville, Mamoudzou	More images	Mayotte	2009		
Manosque	Hôtel de Ville, Manosque	More images	Alpes-de-Haute-Provence	1750		Base Mérimée: PA00080425, French Ministry of Culture (in French).
Mantes-la-Jolie	Hôtel de Ville, Mantes-la-Jolie	More images	Yvelines	1972		Architects: Raymond Lopez, Raymond Marabout, Rémi Lopez and Henri Longepierre.
Mantes-la-Ville	Hôtel de Ville, Mantes-la-Ville	More images	Yvelines	1886		
Marcq-en-Barœul	Hôtel de Ville, Marcq-en-Barœul	More images	Nord	1937		Architects: René Gobillon and Gaston Trannoy.
Marignane	Hôtel de Ville, Marignane	More images	Bouches-du-Rhône	1664		Base Mérimée: PA00081322, French Ministry of Culture (in French)
Marseille	Hôtel de Ville, Marseille	More images	Bouches-du-Rhône	1673		Base Mérimée: PA00081354, French Ministry of Culture (in French). Architects: Gaspard Puget and Jean-Baptiste Méolans.
Martigues	Hôtel de Ville, Martigues	More images	Bouches-du-Rhône	1983		Architect: Claude Delaugerre.
Massy	Hôtel de Ville, Massy	More images	Essonne	1986		
Matoury	Hôtel de Ville, Matoury	More images	French Guiana	1980		
Maubeuge	Hôtel de Ville, Maubeuge	More images	Nord	1970		Architects: Jacques Corbeau and André Gaillard.
Maurepas	Hôtel de Ville, Maurepas		Yvelines	1973		
Meaux	Hôtel de Ville, Meaux	More images	Seine-et-Marne	1900		Architect: Auguste Boudinaud.
Melun	Hôtel de Ville, Melun	More images	Seine-et-Marne	1848		Architect: Jean-Jacques Gilson.
Menton	Hôtel de Ville, Menton	More images	Alpes-Maritimes	1861		Architect: Victor Sabatier.
Mérignac	Hôtel de Ville, Mérignac	More images	Gironde	1790		
Metz	Hôtel de Ville, Metz	More images	Moselle	1771		Base Mérimée: PA00106852, French Ministry of Culture (in French). Architect: Jacques-François Blondel.
Meudon	Hôtel de Ville, Meudon	More images	Hauts-de-Seine	1888		Architect: Sieu Larrieu.
Meyzieu	Hôtel de Ville, Meyzieu	More images	Metropolis of Lyon	1994		
Millau	Hôtel de Ville, Millau	More images	Aveyron	1876		Architect: Louis-Alphonse Corvetto.
Mitry-Mory	Hôtel de Ville, Mitry-Mory	More images	Seine-et-Marne	1936		
Mons-en-Barœul	Hôtel de Ville, Mons-en-Barœul	More images	Nord	1977		Architect: Jehan Boyer.
Montaigu-Vendée	Hôtel de Ville, Montaigu-Vendée	More images	Vendée	1866		
Montauban	Hôtel de Ville, Montauban	More images	Tarn-et-Garonne	1695		Base Mérimée: IA82100264, French Ministry of Culture (in French). Architect: François d'Orbay.
Montbéliard	Hôtel de Ville, Montbéliard	More images	Doubs	1778		Base Mérimée: PA00101677, French Ministry of Culture (in French). Architect: Philippe de La Guêpière.
Mont-de-Marsan	Hôtel de Ville, Mont-de-Marsan	More images	Landes	1901		Architect: Henri Dépruneaux.
Montélimar	Hôtel de Ville, Montélimar	More images	Drôme	1876		Architect: François Régis Chaumartin.
Montereau-Fault-Yonne	Hôtel de Ville, Montereau-Fault-Yonne	More images	Seine-et-Marne	1750		
Montfermeil	Hôtel de Ville, Montfermeil	More images	Seine-Saint-Denis	1853		
Montgeron	Hôtel de Ville, Montgeron	More images	Essonne	1750		
Montigny-le-Bretonneux	Hôtel de Ville, Montigny-le-Bretonneux	More images	Yvelines	1987		Architect: Henri Beauclair.
Montluçon	Hôtel de Ville, Montluçon	More images	Allier	1912		Architect: Gilbert Talbourdeau.
Montmorency	Hôtel de Ville, Montmorency	More images	Val-d'Oise	1791		Architect: Pierre Lerride.
Montpellier	Hôtel de Ville, Montpellier	More images	Hérault	2011	41 metres (135 ft)	Architects: Jean Nouvel and François Fontès.
Montreuil	Hôtel de Ville, Montreuil	More images	Seine-Saint-Denis	1935	40 metres (131 ft)	Base Mérimée: PA93000077, French Ministry of Culture (in French). Architect: Florent Nanquette.
Montrouge	Hôtel de Ville, Montrouge	More images	Hauts-de-Seine	1883		Base Mérimée: IA00076077, French Ministry of Culture (in French). Architect: Jacques Paul Lequeux.
Morsang-sur-Orge	Hôtel de Ville, Morsang-sur-Orge	More images	Essonne	1921		
Mulhouse	Hôtel de Ville, Mulhouse	More images	Haut-Rhin	1553		Base Mérimée: PA00085528, French Ministry of Culture (in French). Architect: Michel Lynthumer.
Muret	Hôtel de Ville, Muret	More images	Haute-Garonne	1990		
Nancy	Hôtel de Ville, Nancy	More images	Meurthe-et-Moselle	1755		Base Mérimée: PA00106124, French Ministry of Culture (in French). Architect: Emmanuel Héré de Corny.
Nanterre	Hôtel de Ville, Nanterre		Hauts-de-Seine	1973	15.5 metres (51 ft)	Architects: Yves Bedon and Jean Darras.
Nantes	Hôtel de Ville, Nantes	More images	Loire-Atlantique	1606		Architect: Hélie Rémigereau.
Narbonne	Hôtel de Ville, Narbonne	More images	Aude	1852	42 metres (138 ft)	Base Mérimée: PA00102789, French Ministry of Culture (in French). Architect: Eugène Viollet-le-Duc.
Nemours	Hôtel de Ville, Nemours	More images	Seine-et-Marne	1669		Base Mérimée: PA00087164, French Ministry of Culture (in French). Architect: Jules Hardouin-Mansart.
Neuilly-Plaisance	Hôtel de Ville, Neuilly-Plaisance	More images	Seine-Saint-Denis	1865		
Neuilly-sur-Marne	Hôtel de Ville, Neuilly-sur-Marne	More images	Seine-Saint-Denis	1987		
Neuilly-sur-Seine	Hôtel de Ville, Neuilly-sur-Seine	More images	Hauts-de-Seine	1886		Base Mérimée: IA00079694, French Ministry of Culture (in French). Architects: Victor Dutocq and Charles Simonet.
Nevers	Hôtel de Ville, Nevers	More images	Nièvre	1834		Base Mérimée: PA00125321, French Ministry of Culture (in French). Architect: Pierre Paillard.
Nice	Hôtel de Ville, Nice	More images	Alpes-Maritimes	1722		Architect: Nicolas Anselmi.
Nîmes	Hôtel de Ville, Nîmes	More images	Gard	1703		Base Mérimée: PA00103101, French Ministry of Culture (in French). Architect: Augustin-Charles d'Aviler.
Niort	Hôtel de Ville, Niort	More images	Deux-Sèvres	1901		Base Mérimée: PA79000045, French Ministry of Culture (in French). Architect: Georges Lasseron.
Nogent-sur-Marne	Hôtel de Ville, Nogent-sur-Marne	More images	Val-de-Marne	1879		Base Mérimée: IA00049965, French Ministry of Culture (in French). Architect: Victor Guillemin.
Nogent-sur-Oise	Hôtel de Ville, Nogent-sur-Oise	More images	Oise	1822		
Noisy-le-Grand	Hôtel de Ville, Noisy-le-Grand	More images	Seine-Saint-Denis	1865		
Noisy-le-Sec	Hôtel de Ville, Noisy-le-Sec	More images	Seine-Saint-Denis	1846		Architect: Paul-Eugène Lequeux.
Noyon	Hôtel de Ville, Noyon	More images	Oise	1520		Base Mérimée: PA60000019, French Ministry of Culture (in French). Architect: Matthieu Réaulme.
Olivet	Hôtel de Ville, Olivet	More images	Loiret	1887		
Orange	Hôtel de Ville, Orange	More images	Vaucluse	1671		Base Mérimée: PA00082105, French Ministry of Culture (in French).
Orléans	Hôtel de Ville, Orléans	More images	Loiret	1981		Architect: Xavier Arsène-Henry.
Orly	Hôtel de Ville, Orly	More images	Val-de-Marne	1997		Architect: Atelier Deroche.
Orvault	Hôtel de Ville, Orvault	More images	Loire-Atlantique	1976		
Oullins	Hôtel de Ville, Oullins	More images	Metropolis of Lyon	1903		Architect: Jean Clapot.
Oyonnax	Hôtel de Ville, Oyonnax	More images	Ain	1899		
Ozoir-la-Ferrière	Hôtel de Ville, Ozoir-la-Ferrière	More images	Seine-et-Marne	2007		
Palaiseau	Hôtel de Ville, Palaiseau	More images	Essonne	1770		Architect: Pierre Alexandre Danjan.
Pantin	Hôtel de Ville, Pantin	More images	Seine-Saint-Denis	1886		Base Mérimée: PA93000074, French Ministry of Culture (in French). Architects: Raulin Gustave and Guélorget Léon.
Paris	Hôtel de Ville, Paris	More images	Paris	1357	50 metres (164 ft)	Base Mérimée: PA00086319, French Ministry of Culture (in French). Architects: Théodore Ballu and Édouard Deperthes.
Pau	Hôtel de Ville, Pau	More images	Pyrénées-Atlantiques	1862		Base Mérimée: PA64000112, French Ministry of Culture (in French). Architects: Pierre-Bernard Lefranc and Gustave Lévy.
Périgueux	Hôtel de Ville, Périgueux	More images	Dordogne	1790		
Perpignan	Hôtel de Ville, Perpignan	More images	Pyrénées-Orientales	1318		Base Mérimée: PA00104079, French Ministry of Culture (in French).
Pertuis	Hôtel de Ville, Pertuis	More images	Vaucluse	1690		
Pessac	Hôtel de Ville, Pessac	More images	Gironde	1868		
Petit-Bourg	Hôtel de Ville, Petit-Bourg	More images	Guadeloupe	1932		Architect: Ali Tur.
Pierrefitte-sur-Seine	Hôtel de Ville, Pierrefitte-sur-Seine	More images	Seine-Saint-Denis	1935		Architect: Roger Vinet.
Plaisir	Hôtel de Ville, Plaisir	More images	Yvelines	1895		
Poissy	Hôtel de Ville, Poissy	More images	Yvelines	1937		Base Mérimée: PA78000002, French Ministry of Culture (in French). Architects: Pierre Mathé and Henri Calsat.
Poitiers	Hôtel de Ville, Poitiers	More images	Vienne	1875		Base Mérimée: PA00105619, French Ministry of Culture (in French). Architect: Antoine-Gaetan Guérinot.
Pontault-Combault	Hôtel de Ville, Pontault-Combault	More images	Seine-Saint-Denis	1490		
Pontoise	Hôtel de Ville, Pontoise	More images	Val-d'Oise	1860		
Puteaux	Hôtel de Ville, Puteaux	More images	Hauts-de-Seine	1934		Architects: Édouard Niermans and Jean Niermans.
Quimper	Hôtel de Ville, Quimper	More images	Finistère	1831		Architect: François Marie Lemarié.
Rambouillet	Hôtel de Ville, Rambouillet	More images	Yvelines	1787		Base Mérimée: PA00087583, French Ministry of Culture (in French). Architect: Jacques-Jean Thévenin.
Reims	Hôtel de Ville, Reims	More images	Marne	1628		Base Mérimée: PA00078795, French Ministry of Culture (in French). Architect: Jean Bonhomme.
Rennes	Hôtel de Ville, Rennes	More images	Ille-et-Vilaine	1743		Base Mérimée: PA00090703, French Ministry of Culture (in French). Architect: Jacques Gabriel.
Rezé	Hôtel de Ville, Rezé	More images	Loire-Atlantique	1989		Architect: Alessandro Anselmi.
Rillieux-la-Pape	Hôtel de Ville, Rillieux-la-Pape	More images	Metropolis of Lyon	1800		
Ris-Orangis	Hôtel de Ville, Ris-Orangis	More images	Essonne	1700		
Roanne	Hôtel de Ville, Roanne	More images	Loire	1874		Architect: Édouard Corroyer.
Rochefort	Hôtel de Ville, Rochefort	More images	Charente-Maritime	1770		
Rodez	Hôtel de Ville, Rodez	More images	Aveyron	1994		Architects: Marion, Holderbach and Perboyre.
Roissy-en-Brie	Hôtel de Ville, Roissy-en-Brie	More images	Seine-et-Marne	1665		
Romainville	Hôtel de Ville, Romainville	More images	Seine-Saint-Denis	1873		Architect: Paul-Eugène Lequeux.
Romans-sur-Isère	Hôtel de Ville, Romans-sur-Isère	More images	Drôme	1802		
Rosny-sous-Bois	Hôtel de Ville, Rosny-sous-Bois	More images	Seine-Saint-Denis	1964	32.4 metres (106 ft)	Architect: Jean de Mailly.
Roubaix	Hôtel de Ville, Roubaix	More images	Nord	1911		Base Mérimée: PA59000020, French Ministry of Culture (in French). Architect: Victor Laloux.
Rouen	Hôtel de Ville, Rouen	More images	Seine-Maritime	1825		Base Mérimée: PA00100851, French Ministry of Culture (in French). Architects: Jean-Pierre Defrance, Jean-Baptiste Le Brument and Charles-Felix Maillet du Boullay.
Rueil-Malmaison	Hôtel de Ville, Rueil-Malmaison	More images	Hauts-de-Seine	1978		
Saint-André	Hôtel de Ville, Saint-André	More images	Réunion	1897		Architect: Auguste-Joseph-Elie Bertin.
Saint-Anne	Hôtel de Ville, Sainte-Anne	More images	Guadeloupe	1950		
Saint-Antonin-Noble-Val	Hôtel de Ville, Saint-Antonin-Noble-Val	More images	Tarn-et-Garonne	1752		Base Mérimée: IA00065509, French Ministry of Culture (in French). Architect: Jean-Baptiste Arnaud.
Saint-Benoît	Hôtel de Ville, Saint-Benoît	More images	Réunion	1966		Architect: Jean Hebrard Béton.
Saint-Brieuc	Hôtel de Ville, Saint-Brieuc	More images	Côtes-d'Armor	1873		Architect: Alphonse Guépin.
Saint-Chamond	Hôtel de Ville, Saint-Chamond	More images	Loire	1624		Base Mérimée: PA00117589, French Ministry of Culture (in French).
Saint-Cloud	Hôtel de Ville, Saint-Cloud	More images	Hauts-de-Seine	1874		Base Mérimée: IA92000280, French Ministry of Culture (in French). Architect: Julien Bérault.
Saint-Cyr-l'École	Hôtel de Ville, Saint-Cyr-l'École	More images	Yvelines	1956		Architect: Georges Servati.
Saint-Denis	Hôtel de Ville, Saint-Denis	More images	Réunion	1860		Base Mérimée: PA00105815, French Ministry of Culture (in French). Architect: Pierre Georges Grenard.
Saint-Denis	Hôtel de Ville, Saint-Denis	More images	Seine-Saint-Denis	1883		Architect: Paul Laynaud.
Saint-Dié-des-Vosges	Hôtel de Ville, Saint-Dié-des-Vosges	More images	Vosges	1957		Architect: Albert Debès.
Saint-Dizier	Hôtel de Ville, Saint-Dizier	More images	Haute-Marne	1827		Architect: Louis-Bernard Guyton.
Sainte-Foy-lès-Lyon	Hôtel de Ville, Sainte-Foy-lès-Lyon	More images	Metropolis of Lyon	1882		Architect: Henry de Champ.
Sainte-Geneviève-des-Bois	Hôtel de Ville, Sainte-Geneviève-des-Bois	More images	Essonne	1936		Architect: René Guignard.
Sainte-Marie	Hôtel de Ville, Sainte-Marie	More images	Réunion	1860		
Sainte-Rose	Hôtel de Ville, Sainte-Rose	More images	Guadeloupe	1931		Architect: Gérard-Michel Corbin.
Saintes	Hôtel de Ville, Saintes	More images	Charente-Maritime	1874		Architect: Charles Brouty.
Sainte-Suzanne	Hôtel de Ville, Sainte-Suzanne	More images	Réunion	1847		
Saint-Étienne	Hôtel de Ville, Saint-Étienne	More images	Loire	1830		Base Mérimée: IA42000040, French Ministry of Culture (in French). Architect: Jean-Michel Dalgabio.
Saint-Genis-Laval	Hôtel de Ville, Saint-Genis-Laval	More images	Metropolis of Lyon	1605		
Saint-Germain-en-Laye	Hôtel de Ville, Saint-Germain-en-Laye	More images	Yvelines	1778		
Saint-Gratien	Hôtel de Ville, Saint-Gratien	More images	Val-d'Oise	1909		Architect: Paul Nief.
Saint-Herblain	Hôtel de Ville, Saint-Herblain	More images	Loire-Atlantique	1938		Architect: Pierre Joëssel.
Saint-Jean-de-Braye	Hôtel de Ville, Saint-Jean-de-Braye	More images	Loiret	1893		
Saint-Joseph	Hôtel de Ville, Saint-Joseph	More images	Réunion	1953		
Saint-Laurent-du-Maroni	Hôtel de Ville, Saint-Laurent-du-Maroni	More images	French Guiana	1907		
Saint-Laurent-du-Var	Hôtel de Ville, Saint-Laurent-du-Var	More images	Alpes-Maritimes	1993		Architects: Cabinet Anfosso-Cecconi.
Saint-Leu	Hôtel de Ville, Saint-Leu	More images	Réunion	1847		
Saint-Louis	Hôtel de Ville, Saint-Louis	More images	Haut-Rhin	1989		
Saint-Malo	Hôtel de Ville, Saint-Malo	More images	Ille-et-Vilaine	1424		
Saint-Mandé	Hôtel de Ville, Saint-Mandé	More images	Val-de-Marne	1865		Base Mérimée: IA00074124, French Ministry of Culture (in French). Architect: Claude Naissant.
Saint-Martin-d'Hères	Hôtel de Ville, Saint-Martin-d'Hères	More images	Isère	1981		
Saint-Maur-des-Fossés	Hôtel de Ville, Saint-Maur-des-Fossés	More images	Val-de-Marne	1876		Base Mérimée: IA00059543, French Ministry of Culture (in French). Architect: Henri Ratouin.
Saint-Médard-en-Jalles	Hôtel de Ville, Saint-Médard-en-Jalles	More images	Gironde	1936		Architect: Albert Dumons.
Saint-Michel-sur-Orge	Hôtel de Ville, Saint-Michel-sur-Orge	More images	Essonne	1750		
Saint-Nazaire	Hôtel de Ville, Saint-Nazaire		Loire-Atlantique	1960		Architect: Michel Roux-Spitz.
Saint-Ouen-l'Aumône	Hôtel de Ville, Saint-Ouen-l'Aumône	More images	Val-d'Oise	1979		
Saint-Ouen-sur-Seine	Hôtel de Ville, Saint-Ouen-sur-Seine	More images	Seine-Saint-Denis	1868		Architect: Paul-Eugène Lequeux.
Saint-Paul	Hôtel de Ville, Saint-Paul	More images	Réunion	1740		Architect: Édouard Robert.
Saint-Pierre	Hôtel de Ville, Saint-Pierre	More images	Réunion	1773		Architect: Base Mérimée: PA00105829, French Ministry of Culture (in French).
Saint-Quentin	Hôtel de Ville, Saint-Quentin	More images	Aisne	1509		Base Mérimée: PA00115913, French Ministry of Culture (in French). Architect: Colard Noël.
Saint-Raphaël	Hôtel de Ville, Saint-Raphaël	More images	Var	1832		Architect: Esprit Lantouin.
Saint-Sébastien-sur-Loire	Hôtel de Ville, Saint-Sébastien-sur-Loire	More images	Loire-Atlantique	1982		
Salon-de-Provence	Hôtel de Ville, Salon-de-Provence	More images	Bouches-du-Rhône	1658		
Sannois	Hôtel de Ville, Sannois	More images	Val-d'Oise	1994		
Sarcelles	Hôtel de Ville, Sarcelles	More images	Val-d'Oise	1885		Base Mérimée: PA95000018, French Ministry of Culture (in French). Architect: Paul Boeswillwald.
Sartrouville	Hôtel de Ville, Sartrouville	More images	Yvelines	1924		
Saumur	Hôtel de Ville, Saumur	More images	Maine-et-Loire	1515		Base Mérimée: PA00109329, French Ministry of Culture (in French).
Savigny-le-Temple	Hôtel de Ville, Savigny-le-Temple	More images	Seine-et-Marne	1985		
Savigny-sur-Orge	Hôtel de Ville, Savigny-sur-Orge	More images	Essonne	1999		Architects: Claude Liverato and Jean-Louis Chentrier.
Sceaux	Hôtel de Ville, Sceaux	More images	Hauts-de-Seine	1865		Base Mérimée: IA00119724, French Ministry of Culture (in French). Architect: Claude Naissant.
Schiltigheim	Hôtel de Ville, Schiltigheim	More images	Bas-Rhin	1969		Base Mérimée: IA67018011, French Ministry of Culture (in French). Architects: Henri Jean Calsat and Louis Schneider.
Sens	Hôtel de Ville, Sens	More images	Yonne	1904		Base Mérimée: PA00113862, French Ministry of Culture (in French). Architects: Joseph Dupont and Jules Poivert.
Sète	Hôtel de Ville, Sète	More images	Hérault	1719		
Sevran	Hôtel de Ville, Sevran	More images	Seine-Saint-Denis	2015		
Sèvres	Hôtel de Ville, Sèvres	More images	Hauts-de-Seine	1630		Base Mérimée: IA00048511, French Ministry of Culture (in French).
Soissons	Hôtel de Ville, Soissons	More images	Aisne	1775		Base Mérimée: PA02000064, French Ministry of Culture (in French). Architect: Jean-François Advyné.
Stains	Hôtel de Ville, Stains	More images	Seine-Saint-Denis	1750		Base Mérimée: PA00079964, French Ministry of Culture (in French). Architect: Sieur Villebesseys.
Strasbourg	Hôtel de Hanau	More images	Bas-Rhin	1731		Base Mérimée: PA00085061, French Ministry of Culture (in French). Architect: Joseph Massol.
Sucy-en-Brie	Hôtel de Ville, Sucy-en-Brie	More images	Val-de-Marne	1982		Base Mérimée: PA00079908, French Ministry of Culture (in French).
Suresnes	Hôtel de Ville, Suresnes	More images	Hauts-de-Seine	1889		Base Mérimée: IA92000189, French Ministry of Culture (in French). Architect: Jean Bréasson.
Tarbes	Hôtel de Ville, Tarbes	More images	Hautes-Pyrénées	1906		Architect: Pierre Gabarret.
Tassin-la-Demi-Lune	Hôtel de Ville, Tassin-la-Demi-Lune	More images	Metropolis of Lyon	1886		Architect: Sieur Curieux.
Thann	Hôtel de Ville, Thann	More images	Haut-Rhin	1793		Base Mérimée: IA00024241, French Ministry of Culture (in French). Architect: Jean-Baptiste Kléber.
Thiais	Hôtel de Ville, Thiais	More images	Val-de-Marne	1984		Architect: Bernard Gustin.
Thionville	Hôtel de Ville, Thionville	More images	Moselle	1641		Base Mérimée: PA00107059, French Ministry of Culture (in French).
Thonon-les-Bains	Hôtel de Ville, Thonon-les-Bains	More images	Haute-Savoie	1831		Base Mérimée: PA00118461, French Ministry of Culture (in French). Architects: Joseph Mazzone and Louis Perregaud.
Torcy	Hôtel de Ville, Torcy	More images	Seine-et-Marne	1986		
Toulon	Hôtel de Ville, Toulon	More images	Var	1970	54 metres (177 ft)	Architect: Jean de Mailly.
Toulouse	Capitole de Toulouse	More images	Haute-Garonne	1760		Base Mérimée: PA00094497, French Ministry of Culture (in French). Architect: Guillaume Cammas.
Tourcoing	Hôtel de Ville, Tourcoing	More images	Nord	1885		Base Mérimée: PA00107840, French Ministry of Culture (in French). Architect: Charles Maillard.
Tournefeuille	Hôtel de Ville, Tournefeuille	More images	Haute-Garonne	1630		Base Mérimée: PA00094646, French Ministry of Culture (in French).
Tours	Hôtel de Ville, Tours	More images	Indre-et-Loire	1904		Base Mérimée: PA00098190, French Ministry of Culture (in French). Architect: Victor Laloux.
Trappes	Hôtel de Ville, Trappes	More images	Yvelines	2000		Architects: Didier Brard and Alessandro Ménasé.
Tremblay-en-France	Hôtel de Ville, Tremblay-en-France	More images	Seine-Saint-Denis	1981		Architect: Jean Préveral.
Troyes	Hôtel de Ville, Troyes	More images	Aube	1670		Base Mérimée: PA00078272, French Ministry of Culture (in French). Architects: Louis Noblet and Pierre Cottard.
Valence	Hôtel de Ville, Valence	More images	Drôme	1894		Base Mérimée: PA26000034, French Ministry of Culture (in French). Architects: Henri Édouard Bertsch-Proust and Paul Bischoff.
Valenciennes	Hôtel de Ville, Valenciennes	More images	Nord	1870		Base Mérimée: PA59000073, French Ministry of Culture (in French). Architect: Jules-Louis Batigny.
Vandœuvre-lès-Nancy	Hôtel de Ville, Vandœuvre-lès-Nancy	More images	Meurthe-et-Moselle	1980		
Vannes	Hôtel de Ville, Vannes	More images	Morbihan	1886	37 metres (121 ft)	Base Mérimée: PA00091814, French Ministry of Culture (in French). Architect: Amand Charrier.
Vanves	Hôtel de Ville, Vanves	More images	Hauts-de-Seine	1898		Base Mérimée: IA00060613, French Ministry of Culture (in French). Architects: Camille Morel and Emile Lecamp.
Vaulx-en-Velin	Hôtel de Ville, Vaulx-en-Velin	More images	Metropolis of Lyon	1977		
Vélizy-Villacoublay	Hôtel de Ville, Vélizy-Villacoublay	More images	Yvelines	1974		Architect: Alain Gillot.
Vénissieux	Hôtel de Ville, Vénissieux	More images	Metropolis of Lyon	1970		
Vernon	Hôtel de Ville, Vernon	More images	Eure	1895		Base Mérimée: IA27000109, French Ministry of Culture (in French). Architects: Georges Debriès and Adolphe Henry.
Versailles	Hôtel de Ville, Versailles	More images	Yvelines	1900		Architect: Henry Legrand.
Vertou	Hôtel de Ville, Vertou	More images	Loire-Atlantique	1974		
Vichy	Hôtel de Ville, Vichy	More images	Allier	1925	47 metres (154 ft)	Base Mérimée: PA00093396, French Ministry of Culture (in French). Architects: Antoine Chanet and Jean Liogier.
Vienne	Hôtel de Ville, Vienne	More images	Isère	1690		
Vierzon	Hôtel de Ville, Vierzon	More images	Cher	1772		Architect: Sieur de Montrachet.
Vigneux-sur-Seine	Hôtel de Ville, Vigneux-sur-Seine	More images	Essonne	1880		Base Mérimée: IA91000906, French Ministry of Culture (in French). Architect: Henri Basile Supplisson.
Villefranche-sur-Saône	Hôtel de Ville, Villefranche-sur-Saône	More images	Rhône	1928		Architects: Camille Nallet and Albain Decœur.
Villejuif	Hôtel de Ville, Villejuif	More images	Val-de-Marne	1608		Base Mérimée: IA94000157, French Ministry of Culture (in French).
Villemomble	Hôtel de Ville, Villemomble	More images	Seine-Saint-Denis	1985		
Villeneuve-d'Ascq	Hôtel de Ville, Villeneuve-d'Ascq	More images	Nord	1977		Architect: Pierre-François Delannoy
Villeneuve-la-Garenne	Hôtel de Ville, Villeneuve-la-Garenne	More images	Hauts-de-Seine	1965		Architect: Gaston Appert.
Villeneuve-le-Roi	Hôtel de Ville, Villeneuve-le-Roi	More images	Val-de-Marne	1860		Base Mérimée: IA00088217, French Ministry of Culture (in French).
Villeneuve-Saint-Georges	Hôtel de Ville, Villeneuve-Saint-Georges	More images	Val-de-Marne	1773		Base Mérimée: IA00126321, French Ministry of Culture (in French).
Villeneuve-sur-Lot	Hôtel de Ville, Villeneuve-sur-Lot	More images	Lot-et-Garonne	1847		Base Mérimée: IA47001796, French Ministry of Culture (in French).
Villeparisis	Hôtel de Ville, Villeparisis	More images	Seine-et-Marne	1750		
Villepinte	Hôtel de Ville, Villepinte	More images	Seine-Saint-Denis	1996		Architects: Renaud Vignaud & Associés.
Villeurbanne	Hôtel de Ville, Villeurbanne	More images	Metropolis of Lyon	1934	65 metres (213 ft)	Base Mérimée: PA00118150, French Ministry of Culture (in French). Architect: Robert Giroud.
Villiers-le-Bel	Hôtel de Ville, Villiers-le-Bel	More images	Val-d'Oise	1906		Architect: Sieur Cabany.
Villiers-sur-Marne	Hôtel de Ville, Villiers-sur-Marne	More images	Val-de-Marne	1873		Base Mérimée: IA00028149, French Ministry of Culture (in French). Architect: Victor Guillemin.
Vincennes	Hôtel de Ville, Vincennes	More images	Val-de-Marne	1891		Base Mérimée: PA94000011, French Ministry of Culture (in French). Architect: Eugène Calinaud.
Viry-Châtillon	Hôtel de Ville, Viry-Châtillon	More images	Essonne	1855		
Vitrolles	Hôtel de Ville, Vitrolles	More images	Bouches-du-Rhône	1977		
Vitry-sur-Seine	Hôtel de Ville, Vitry-sur-Seine	More images	Val-de-Marne	1985		Architect: François Girard.
Voiron	Hôtel de Ville, Voiron	More images	Isère	1966		
Wasquehal	Hôtel de Ville, Wasquehal	More images	Nord	1867		
Wattrelos	Hôtel de Ville, Wattrelos	More images	Nord	1914		Architect: Ernest Thibeau.
Wissembourg	Hôtel de Ville, Wissembourg	More images	Bas-Rhin	1752		Base Mérimée: PA00085251, French Ministry of Culture (in French). Architect: Joseph Massol.
Yerres	Hôtel de Ville, Yerres	More images	Essonne	1899		

== See also ==
- List of city and town halls
