= Hôtel de Ville, Aubervilliers =

Town hall in Aubervilliers, France

Hôtel de Ville
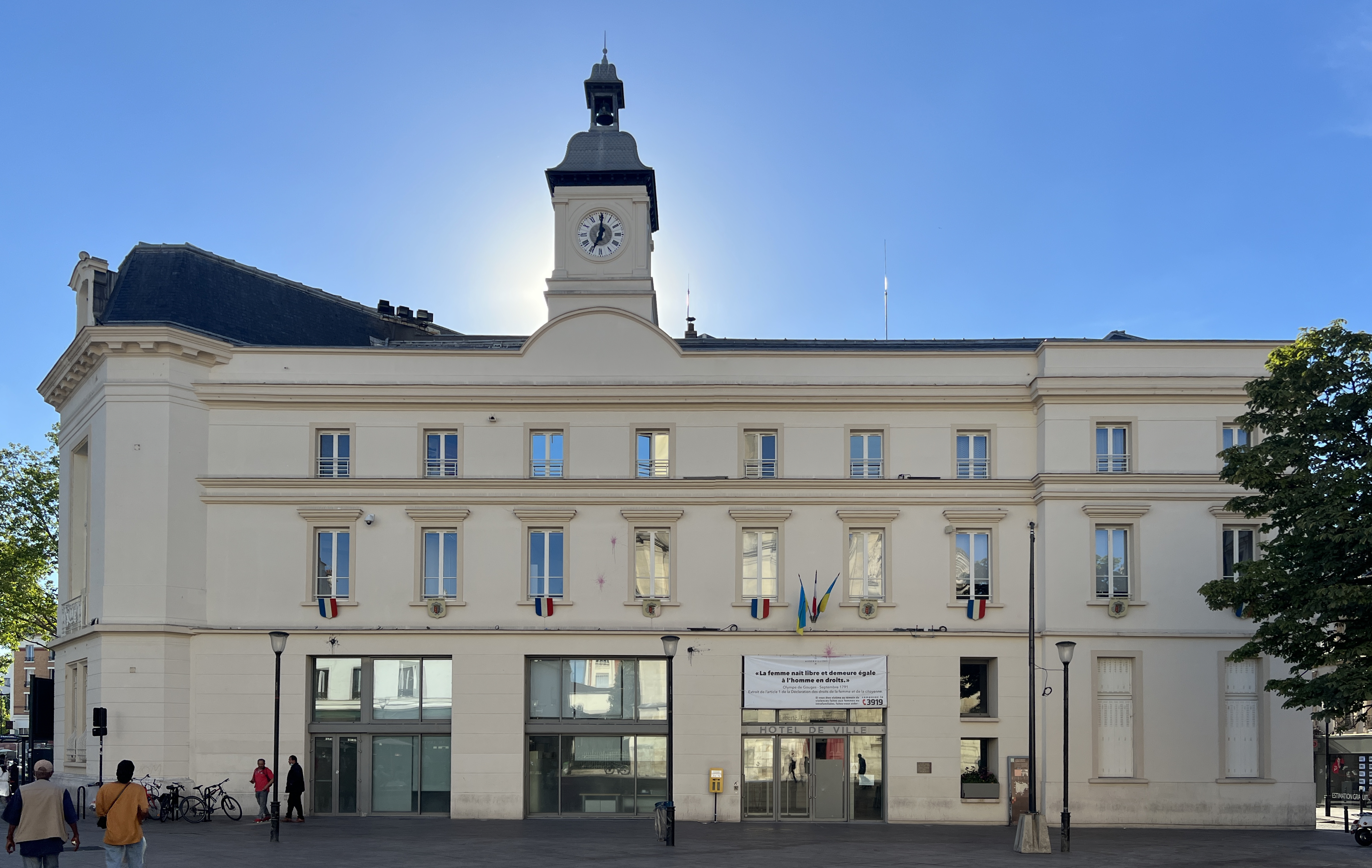
- The main frontage of the Hôtel de Ville in July 2022
- Interactive map of the Hôtel de Ville area

General information
- Type: City hall
- Architectural style: Neoclassical style
- Location: Aubervilliers, France
- Coordinates: 48.9146°N 2.3818°E
- Completed: 1849

Design and construction
- Architect: Jacques Paul Lequeux

The Hôtel de Ville (French pronunciation: [otɛl də vil], City Hall) is a municipal building in Aubervilliers, Seine-Saint-Denis, in the northeast suburbs of Paris, France, standing on Rue de la Commune de Paris.

== History ==
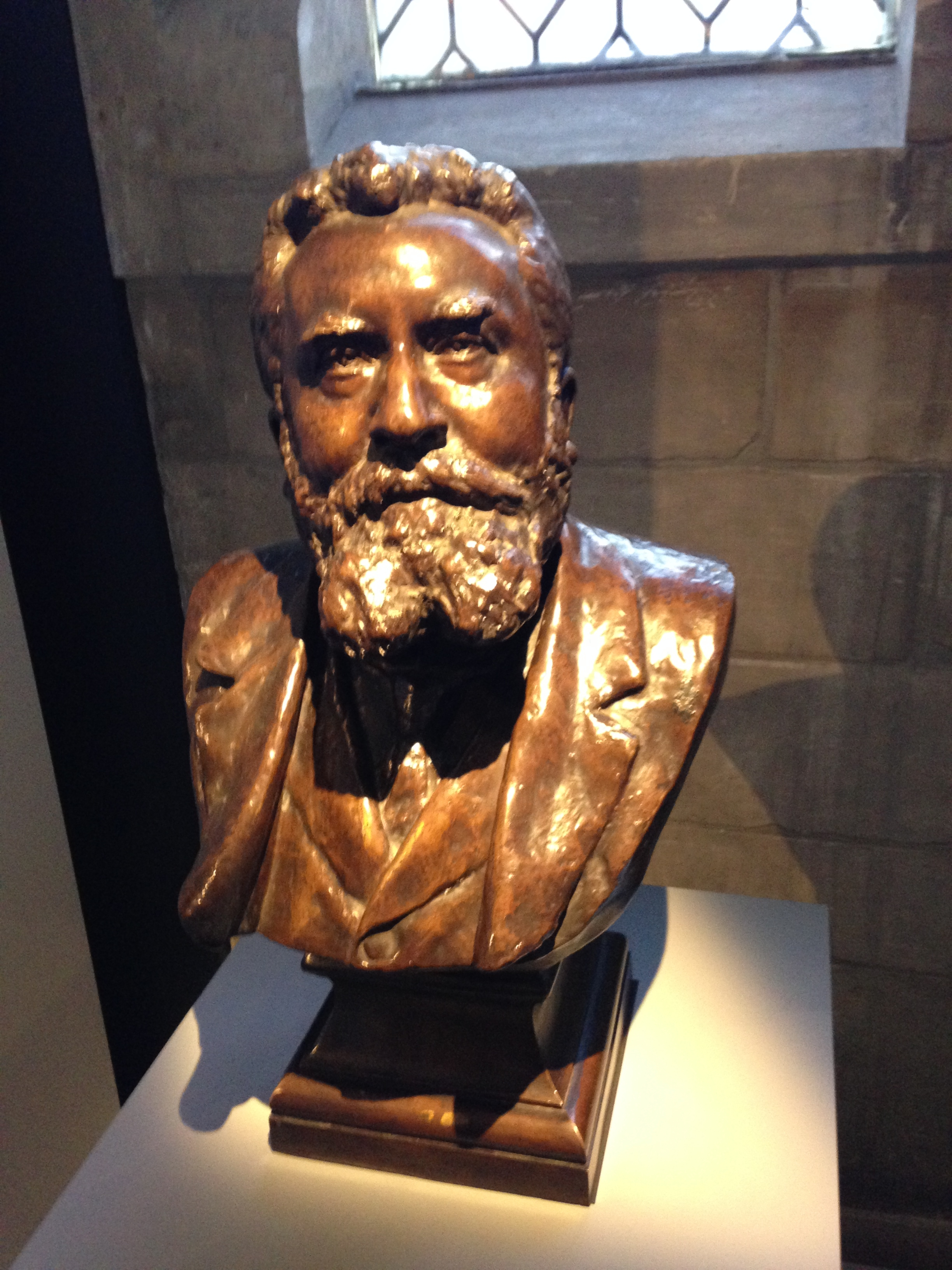
Bust of Jean Jaurès by the sculptor Gabriel Pech

Following the French Revolution, the town council initially held its meetings in the local boys' school. It then relocated to a private house on the corner of Passage Saint-Christophe and Rue de la Commune de Paris. In 1844, the town council decided to commission a dedicated town hall. The site they selected was a triangular area of land occupied by an old cemetery, which had been established by the Church of Notre-Dame-des-Vertus and cleared in 1824. The new building was designed by Jacques Paul Lequeux in the neoclassical style, built in ashlar stone and was officially opened in November 1849.

The design originally involved a symmetrical main frontage of eight bays facing onto Rue de la Commune de Paris. The two central bays featured a pair of doorways, flanked by fluted Doric order pilasters supporting a frieze and an entablature. The other bays on the ground floor were fenestrated by casement windows with moulded surrounds, while the bays on the upper two floors were fenestrated by casement windows with shutters. At roof level, above the two central bays, there was a curved pediment containing a coat of arms and, behind it, a square clock tower with an ogee-shaped dome and a bell-cote. Internally, the principal rooms were the Salle du Conseil (council chamber), the Salles des Commissions (commissions room) and the Salon d'Honneur (room of honour). Between 1858 and 1861, the building was extended, with a new wing stretching along Rue de Moutier. The east end of the extension created two extra bays, slightly projecting forward, on the right of the main frontage. The extension enabled the complex to accommodate a police station, a fire station and a boys' school, although the school moved out in 1878.

The police service and fire service moved out of the building at the turn of the century, and a bust of Jean Jaurès by the sculptor Gabriel Pech was installed in the council chamber in 1914. A war memorial, in the form of a bronze female figure holding a baby surrounded by fallen soldiers and intended to commemorate the lives of local service personnel killed in the First World War, was created by the sculptor, Adolfo Cipriani, and unveiled inside the town hall in 1925. A further extension, along Avenue de la République, was completed in 1926, giving the complex is triangular shape. Two large paintings by Gaston Balande, portraying allegories of abundance & peace and of work, were installed in the commissions room in the early 1930s.

During the Paris insurrection of 19 August 1944, part the Second World War, a Spanish soldier, Eustaquio Pino, and some 30 members of the French Forces of the Interior seized the town hall. In continued fighting, another member of the French Forces of the Interior, Lucien Leveau, was killed at the entrance of the building on 22 August 1944. An additional panel, this time by Boris Taslitzky, depicting liberation, was installed in the commissions room after the war.

In the early 1990s, the complex was refurbished and the main entrance, which had been on Avenue de la République since the 1920s, was moved to the centre of the main façade.
