= Hôtel de Ville, Pau =

Town hall in Pau, France

Hôtel de Ville
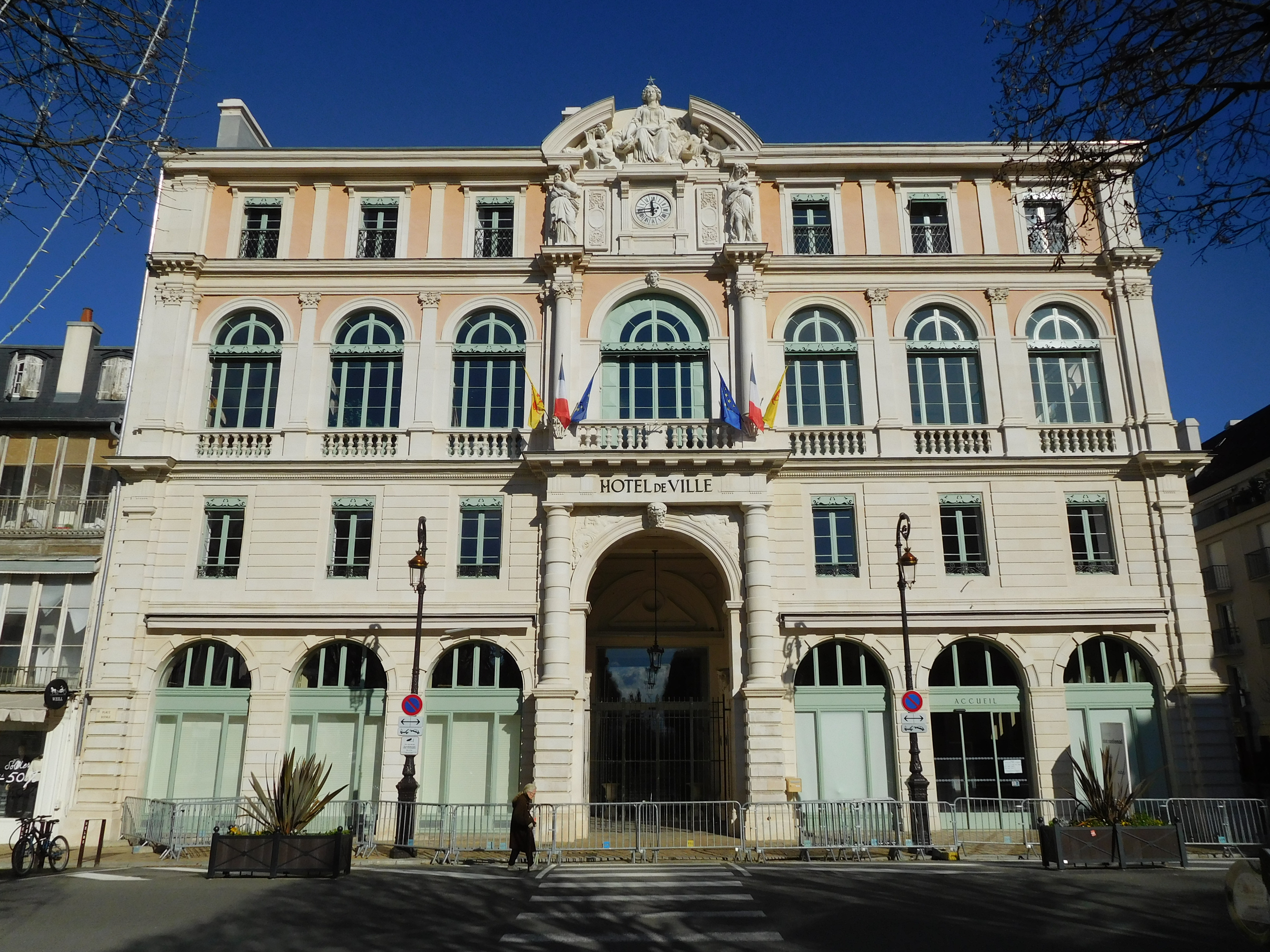
- The main frontage of the Hôtel de Ville in February 2019

General information
- Type: City hall
- Architectural style: Second Empire style
- Location: Pau, France
- Coordinates: 43.2947°N 0.3708°W
- Completed: 1862

Design and construction
- Architects: Pierre-Bernard Lefranc; Gustave Lévy

Monument historique
- Official name: Mairie-théâtre
- Type: Inscrit
- Designated: 2017
- Reference no.: PA64000112

The Hôtel de Ville (French pronunciation: [otɛl də vil], City Hall) is a municipal building in Pau, Pyrénées-Atlantiques, western France, standing on Place Royale. It was originally commissioned as a theatre, but was later remodeled internally to serve as a town hall as well. It was designated a monument historique by the French government in 2017.

== History ==
The first theatre in Pau, established shortly after the French Revolution, was in Place Gramont at the corner with Rue de Liège. In the 1830s, after the old theatre became dilapidated, a group of local businessmen decided to commission a new theatre. The site they chose, in Place Royale, had been identified for a new church to replace Église Saint-Martin, but that proposal had never been realized.

The businessmen incorporated a company to finance and let a contract for the new theatre in 1839. They asked the architect, Pierre-Bernard Lefranc, to prepare drawings. Again, little progress was made until another group of businessmen took over the project and instructed another architect, Gustave Lévy, to realize the earlier proposals. Construction got underway in the mid-1850s. The new theatre was designed in the Second Empire style, built in ashlar stone and was officially opened on 18 December 1862.

The design involved a symmetrical main frontage of seven bays facing onto Place Royale. The central bay, which was slightly projected forward, featured a double-height round headed opening with a moulded surround and a keystone, flanked by banded columns supporting an entablature. On the second floor, there was a French door with a moulded surround, a keystone and a balustrade, flanked by Corinthian order columns supporting a cornice, a clock and an open pediment. The other bays contained round headed openings on the ground floor and were fenestrated by casement windows on the first floor, round headed windows with moulded surrounds and balustrades flanked by Corinthian order pilasters on the second floor, and casement windows with cornices flanked by Doric order pilasters on the third floor. Internally, the principal room was the main auditorium, which featured a fine painted ceiling.

The theatre started with some unspectacular performances and, with poor attendance, got into financial difficulties. The local council, which had previously occupied the first floor of the Halles de Pau (Pau market halls) on Place Clemenceau since the halls had been completed in 1838, decided to acquire the theatre with a view to converting the front part of the building into a town hall. The transaction was completed in April 1876, and the former ballroom was converted into a council chamber.

The appearance of the building was significantly enhanced in the 1890s, when statues of standing female figures were installed on either side of the clock, and a statue of a sitting female figure was installed above the clock, within the pediment. The white terracotta statues were made at a factory in Toulouse founded by Auguste Virebent in 1830.

Following the announcement of the French surrender to Germany in June 1940, during the Second World War, a French Resistance fighter, Daniel Cordier, with the support of the mayor, Pierre Verdenal, assembled a group of 17 local people, including himself, in the town hall and then embarked on a Belgian ship to continue the fight against the Nazis.

After becoming dilapidated, the theatre closed in 1968 and, following an extensive programme of refurbishment works, re-opened in 1984. The rock climber, Alain Robert, climbed the building without a rope in 2000. Temporary repairs had to be carried out after plasterwork fell from the ceiling in one of the boxes in October 2013 and a more significant intervention, which included renovating the facade of the building, took place between 2016 and 2018.
