= Hôtel de Ville, Gap =

Town hall in Gap, France

Hôtel de Ville
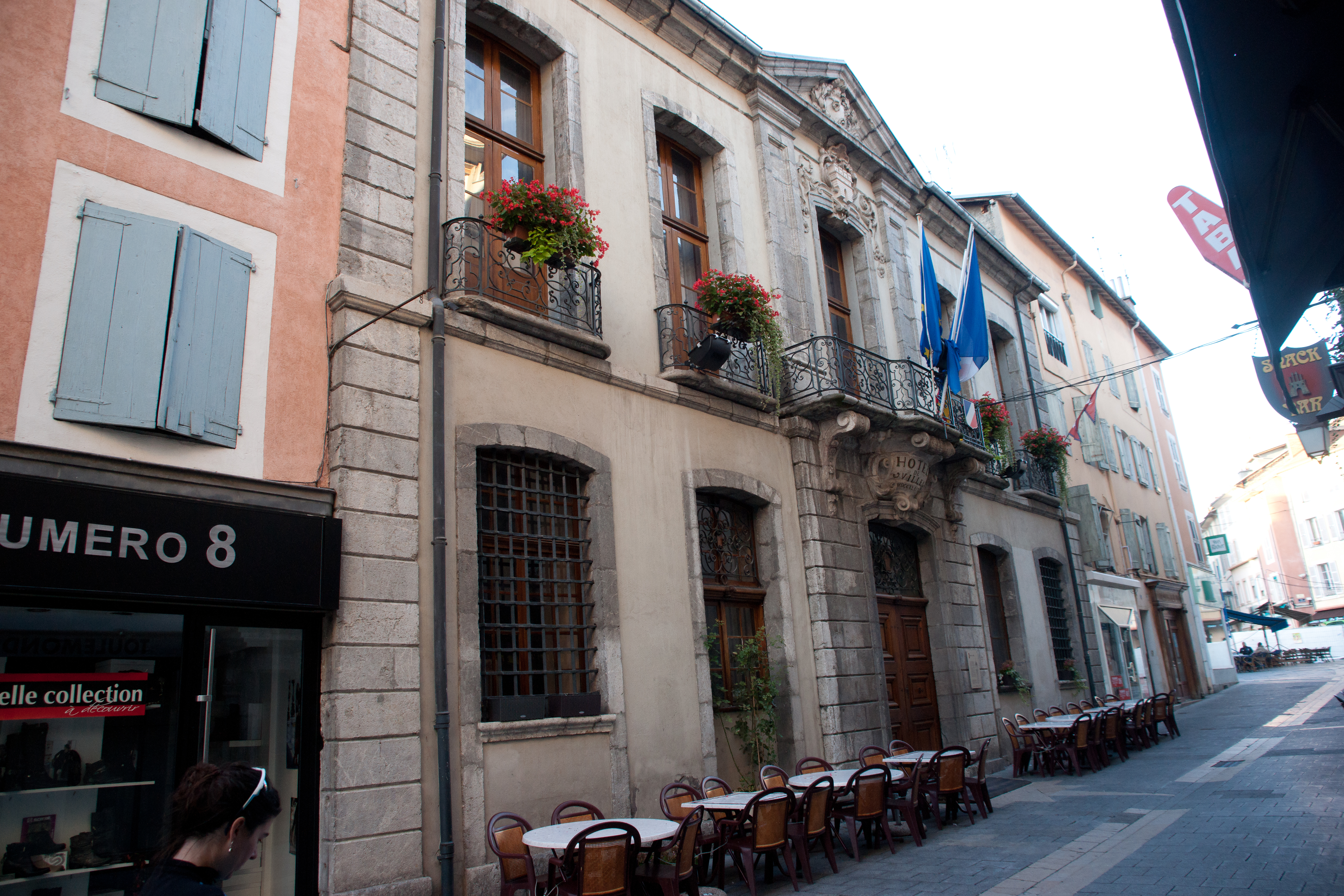
- The main frontage of the Hôtel de Ville in September 2011
- Interactive map of the Hôtel de Ville area

General information
- Type: City hall
- Architectural style: Neoclassical style
- Location: Gap, France
- Coordinates: 44.5588°N 6.0794°E
- Completed: 1743

Design and construction
- Architect: Sieur Lechat

The Hôtel de Ville (French pronunciation: [otɛl də vil], City Hall) is a municipal building in Gap, Hautes-Alpes, in southeastern France, standing on Rue du Colonel Roux. It was designated a monument historique by the French government in 1948.

== History ==
The first town hall in Gap, the Maison Consulat (the consuls' house), was erected on the northwest side of what is now Rue du Colonel Roux, in around 1400. It consisted of an assembly hall, where the consuls met, and was extended by the addition of a clock tower in 1407. In late July 1692, the ruler of the Savoyard state, Victor Amadeus II, Duke of Savoy, operating as a member of the Grand Alliance, invaded the Dauphiné with a large army during the Nine Years' War. Prince Eugene of Savoy was detached to take possession of Gap on 19 August 1692. His troops attacked the town, drove the consuls out, and set fire to the town hall and other buildings.

The consuls led the mayor, Jean Masseron, decided to restore the complex in 1700 and new bells, cast by Antoine and Claude Vallier, were installed in the newly restored clock tower June 1700. In around 1740, after the old town hall became dilapidated, the consuls decided to demolish much of the old building, although retaining the clock tower, and to erect a new town hall alongside the clock tower. The new building was designed by Sieur Lechat in the neoclassical style, built in ashlar stone and was completed in 1743.

The design involved a symmetrical main frontage of five bays facing onto the street. The central bay featured a segmental headed doorway with a moulded surround and ornate keystone on the ground floor, and a French door with a balcony and iron railings on the first floor. The French door was flanked by Doric order pilasters supporting a pediment with a coat of arms in the tympanum. The other bays were fenestrated by segmental headed windows on both floors. Internally, the principal room was the Salle du Conseil (council chamber).

Following the liberation of the town by American troops and by the French Forces of the Interior on 20 August 1944, during the Second World War, General Charles de Gaulle visited the town and laid a wreath at the war memorial in September 1948. On a return visit as President of France in October 1960, he visited the town hall and met with the mayor, Émile Didier, and other members of the council.
