= Hôtel de Ville, Rodez =

Town hall in Rodez, France

Hôtel de Ville
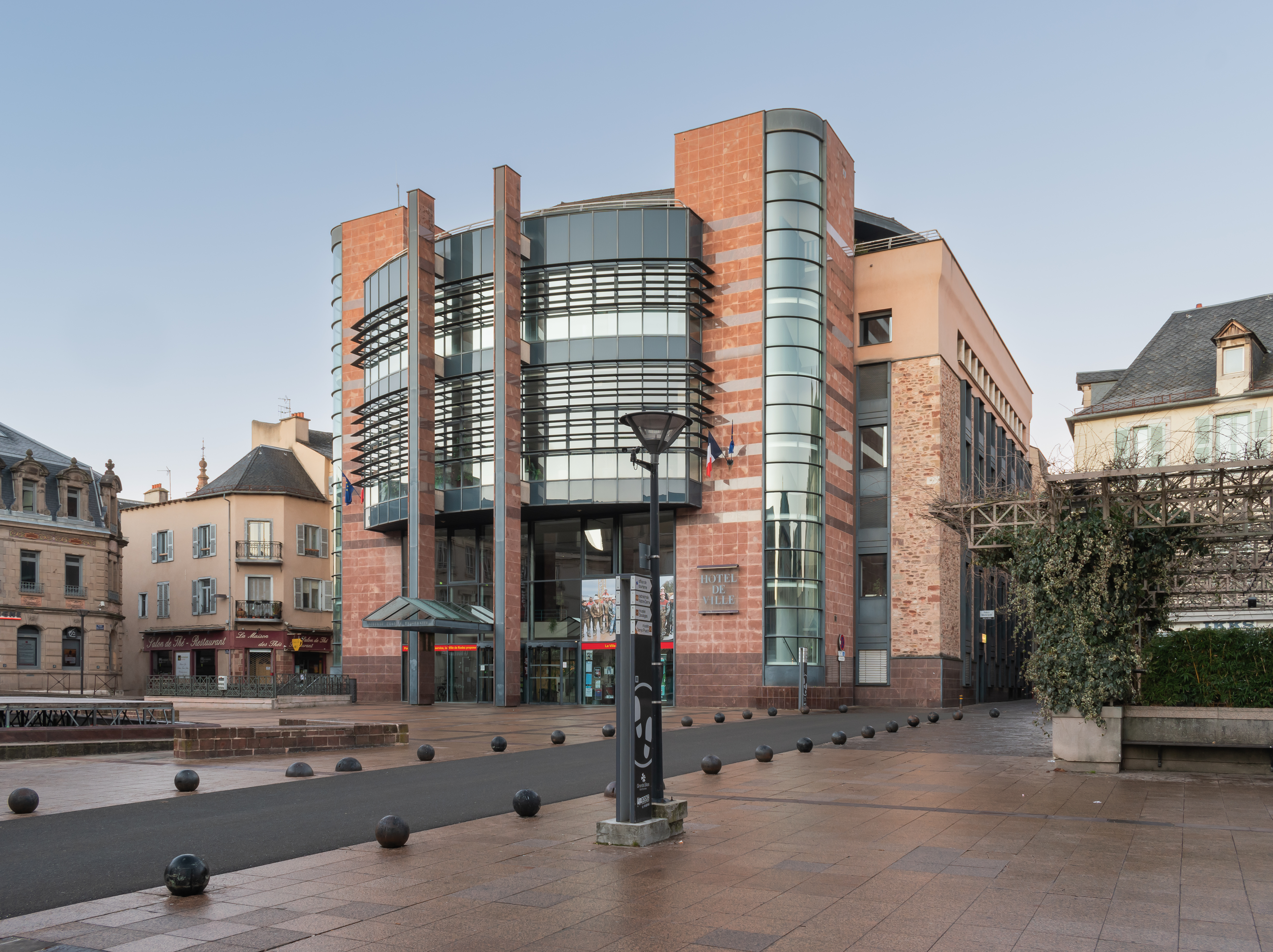
- The main frontage of the Hôtel de Ville in January 2022
- Interactive map of the Hôtel de Ville area

General information
- Type: City hall
- Architectural style: Modern style
- Location: Rodez, France
- Coordinates: 44.3494°N 2.5760°E
- Completed: 1994

Design and construction
- Architects: Marion, Holderbach and Perboyre

The Hôtel de Ville (French pronunciation: [otɛl də vil], City Hall) is a municipal building in Rodez, Aveyron, in southern France, standing on Place Eugène Raynaldy.

== History ==
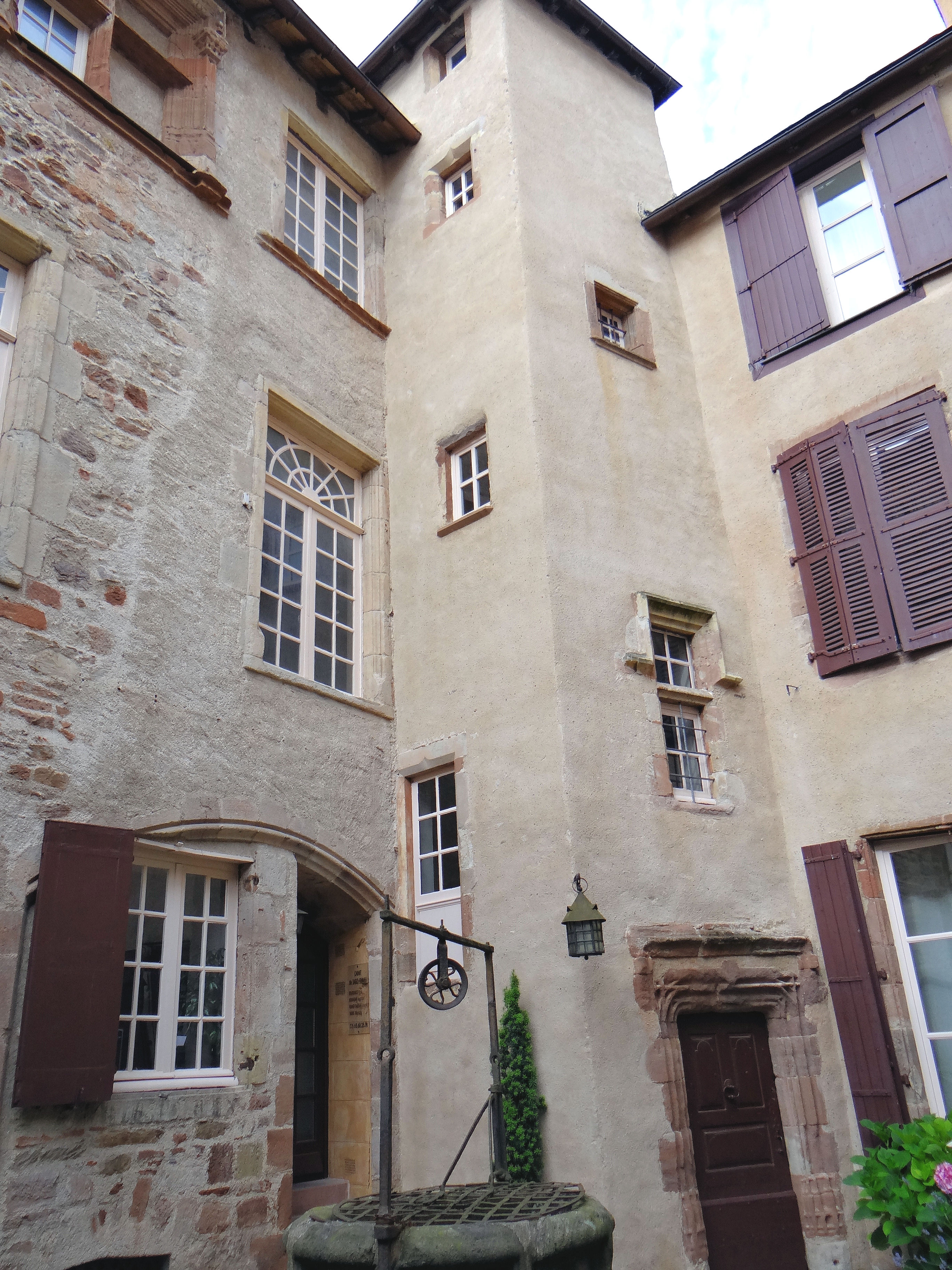
The old chapter house

Under the ancien regime, the consuls initially met in a building in Place du Bourg which also accommodated a butcher's shop and a public weighbridge. This changed in 1360 when they moved to the house of a former priest facing the Church of Saint-Amans in Place de la Madeleine. The consuls had a tower erected there so that the local people could be summoned to public meetings.

Following the French Revolution, the town council met in the old seminary building on what is now Place Eugène Raynaldy. The old seminary building was commissioned by the Bishop of Rodez, Gabriel de Voyer de Paulmy d'Argenson, in 1681. It was an austere four-storey structure of nine bays facing onto the street. It later became known as the Maison du Peuple.

The council then decided to relocate to the chapter house on Place Adrien Rozier in the early 19th century. The chapter house had been erected on the site of the former Roman basilica in the 14th century. It was designed in the medieval style and built in rubble masonry. The design involved two blocks, one facing east and another facing north, with a seven-storey tower connecting them. Access was through an arched doorway, which was flanked by bartizans, on Rue Penavayre. The building accommodated the local clergy until the town council acquired it in 1805.

In 1930, following significant population growth, the council led by the mayor, Eugène Raynaldy, decided to commission a more substantial town hall. The site they selected was occupied by the old seminary building which had briefly served as the town hall in the late 18th century. The seminary building was duly demolished but progress on the new building was slow because of the advent of the Second World War. The new building was designed by René Hartwig in the modern style, built with a concrete frame and sandstone facing and was completed in 1959. The design involved a symmetrical main frontage of seven bays facing onto the square. The central section featured a series of doorways on the ground floor, and a recessed area fenestrated by square casement windows on the first, second and third floors. The casement windows on the upper floors were flanked by huge columns supporting the eaves above. The outer bays were fenestrated by casement windows and flanked by sandstone panels.

In July 1992, after the sandstone started to deteriorate, the council decided to remodel the façade. The programme of works involved the replacement of the sandstone panels with terracotta tiling and the replacement of the recessed section on the upper floors with a curved section of glass cladding. It was carried out to a design by Marion, Holderbach and Perboyre and completed in July 1994.

Following the murder of the local police chief, Pascal Filoé, in front of the town hall in September 2018, the main reception hall on the second floor was renamed the "Salon d'Honneur Pascal Filoé" in June 2019.
