= Hôtel de Ville, Tarbes =

Town hall in Tarbes, France

Hôtel de Ville
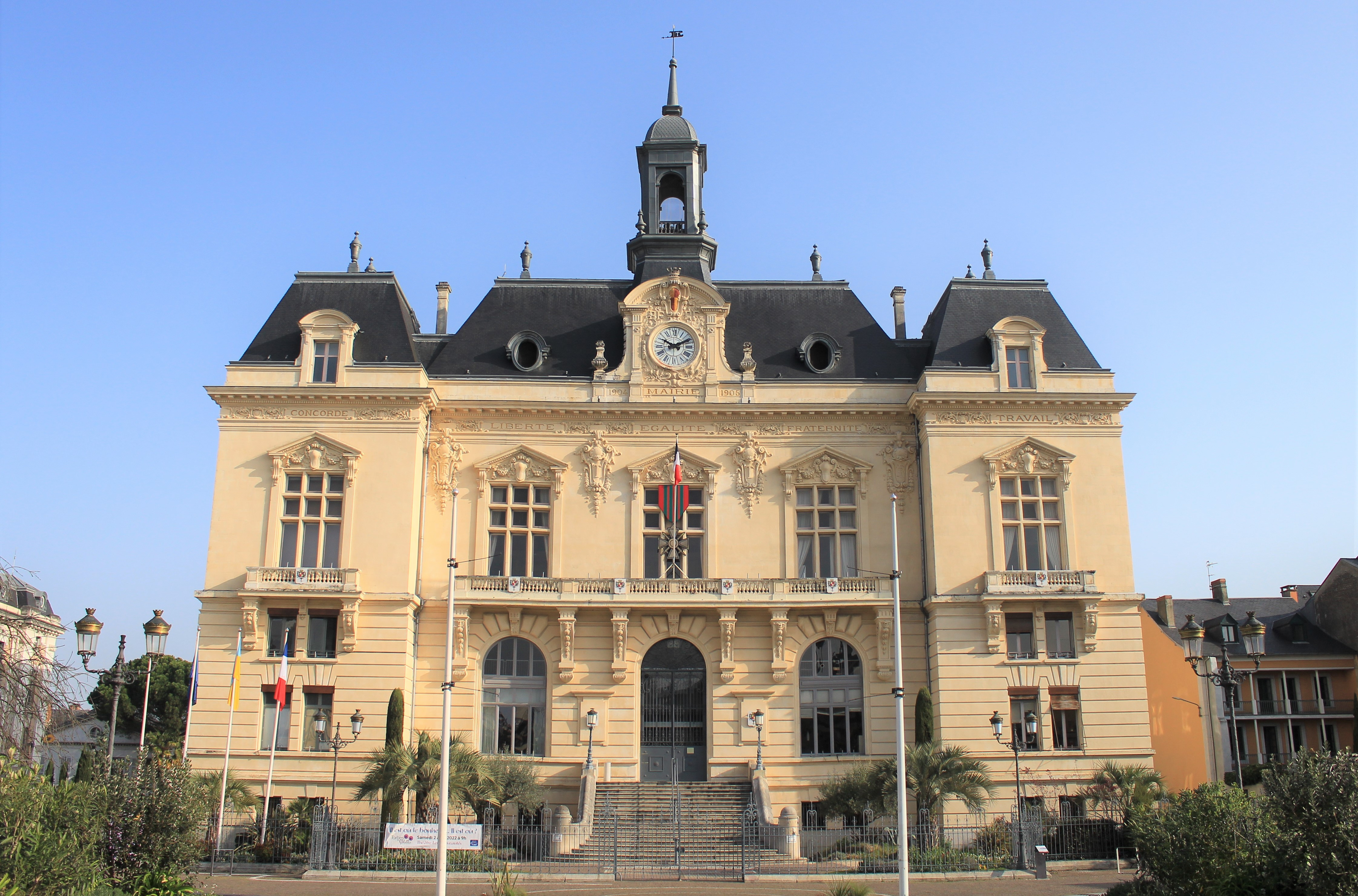
- The main frontage of the Hôtel de Ville in March 2022
- Interactive map of the Hôtel de Ville area

General information
- Type: City hall
- Architectural style: Neoclassical style
- Location: Tarbes, France
- Coordinates: 43.2331°N 0.0781°E
- Completed: 1906

Design and construction
- Architect: Pierre Gabarret

The Hôtel de Ville (French pronunciation: [otɛl də vil], City Hall) is a municipal building in Tarbes, Hautes-Pyrénées, in southwestern France, standing on Place Jean Jaurès.

== History ==
In 1760, the consuls of Tarbes acquired Maison de Beyrie, the location of which has been lost to time, as its meeting place. Following the French Revolution, the new town council decided to buy a more substantial building and purchased Hôtel Castelnau on what is now Rue Brauhauban. The latter building had been the seat of the Counts of Castelnau in the 18th century. The design involved a symmetrical main frontage of seven bays with the central bay featuring a fine double-spiral staircase which provided access to a round headed doorway on the first floor. There was a round headed window with a stone surround and a keystone on the second floor, all surmounted by a pediment. The other bays were fenestrated by segmental headed windows on all three floors. The building was acquired by the council in 1830.

In October 1902, the council led by the mayor, Georges Magnoac, decided to demolish the old town hall to facilitate the construction of what is now Rue André Fourcade. The site they selected for the new building, just to the east of the old town hall, was occupied by the foundations of a fortified castle erected on the orders of Louis XII in the early 16th century. As part of the redevelopment of the site, a statue depicting the revolutionary politician, Georges Danton, giving a speech, was designed by Henri Louis Laffillée and unveiled by the Minister for War, Louis André, in front of the area for the proposed new town hall, on 29 November 1903. The new building was designed by Pierre Gabarret in the neoclassical style, built in ashlar stone at a cost of FFr 500, 000 and was officially opened by the Minister of Public Works, Louis Barthou, on 27 May 1906.

The design involved a symmetrical main frontage of five bays facing onto Place de la République (now Place Jean Jaurès) with the end bays projected forward as pavilions. The central section of three bays featured a short flight of steps leading up to a round headed doorway, with voussoirs and a keystone, flanked by a pair of rounded headed windows with voussoirs and keystones. There were three French doors with pediments and a balustraded balcony on the first floor and at roof level there was an ornate clock flanked by pilasters supporting an open pediment. Behind the clock, there was a square bell tower with a dome, a finial and a weather vane. The outer bays were each fenestrated with four small square windows on the ground floor, a French door with a pediment and a balustraded balcony on the first floor, and a dormer window at attic level. Internally, the principal rooms were the Salle des Mariages (wedding room) and the Salle du Conseil (council chamber).

During the Second World War, the statue of Danton was taken down from its pedestal and hidden in the workshop of a local scrap metal dealer to avoid it being melted down by German troops. Following the liberation of the town on 20 August 1944, the statue was recovered and restored to its pedestal on 30 August 1944.

A large collection of some 140,000 books, which had been accumulated in Hôtel Castelnau and then transferred to the new town hall, was relocated to the Bibliothèque Municipale (Municipal Library) on Rue André Fourcade when it opened in June 1972.
