= Hôtel de Ville, Antony =

Town hall in Antony, France

Hôtel de Ville
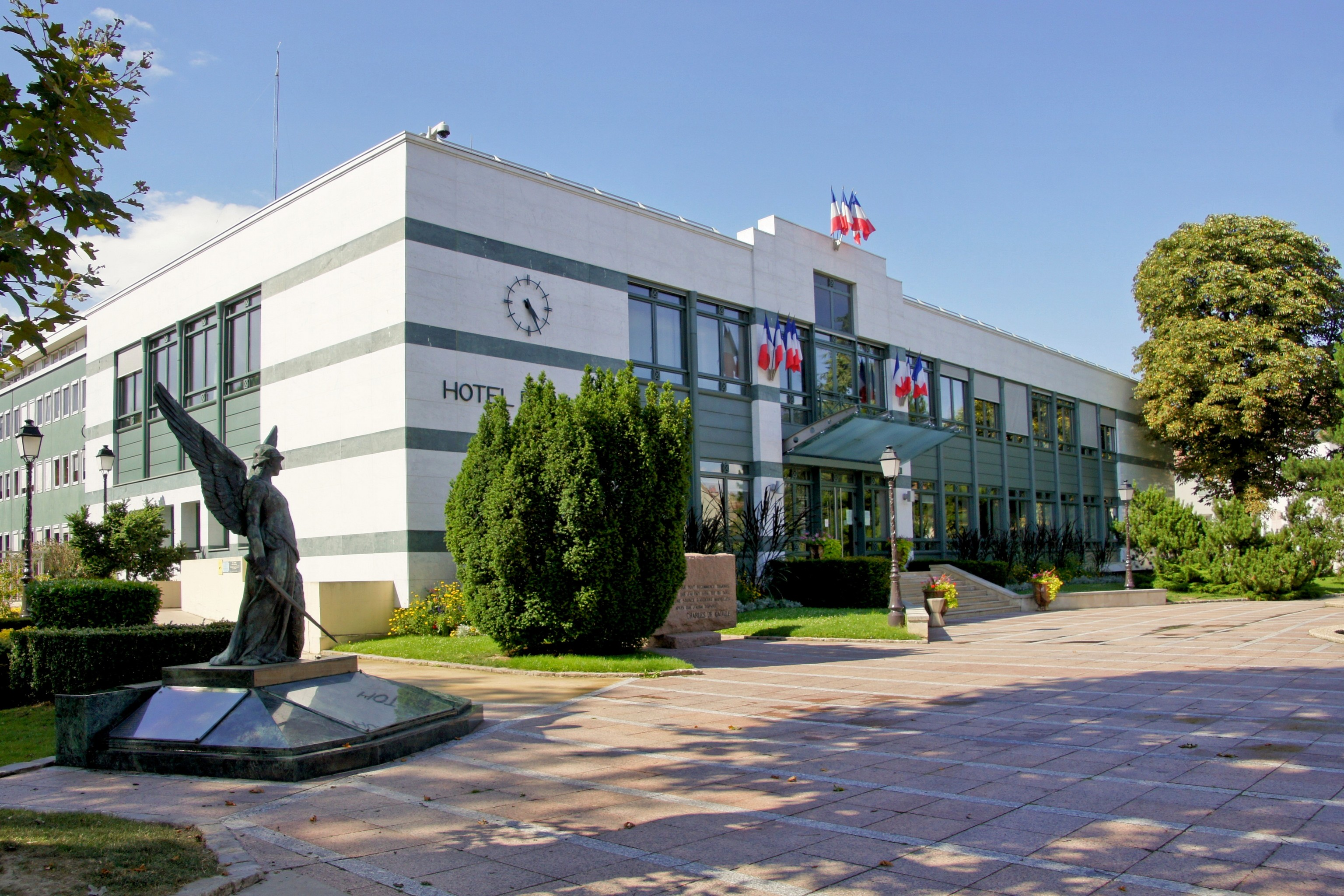
- The main frontage of the Hôtel de Ville in August 2010

General information
- Type: City hall
- Architectural style: Modern style
- Location: Antony, France
- Coordinates: 48.7536°N 2.2958°E
- Completed: 1970

Design and construction
- Architect: Georges Félus

The Hôtel de Ville (French pronunciation: [otɛl də vil], City Hall) is a municipal building in Antony, Hauts-de-Seine, in the southwestern suburbs of Paris, standing on Place de l'Hôtel de Ville.

== History ==
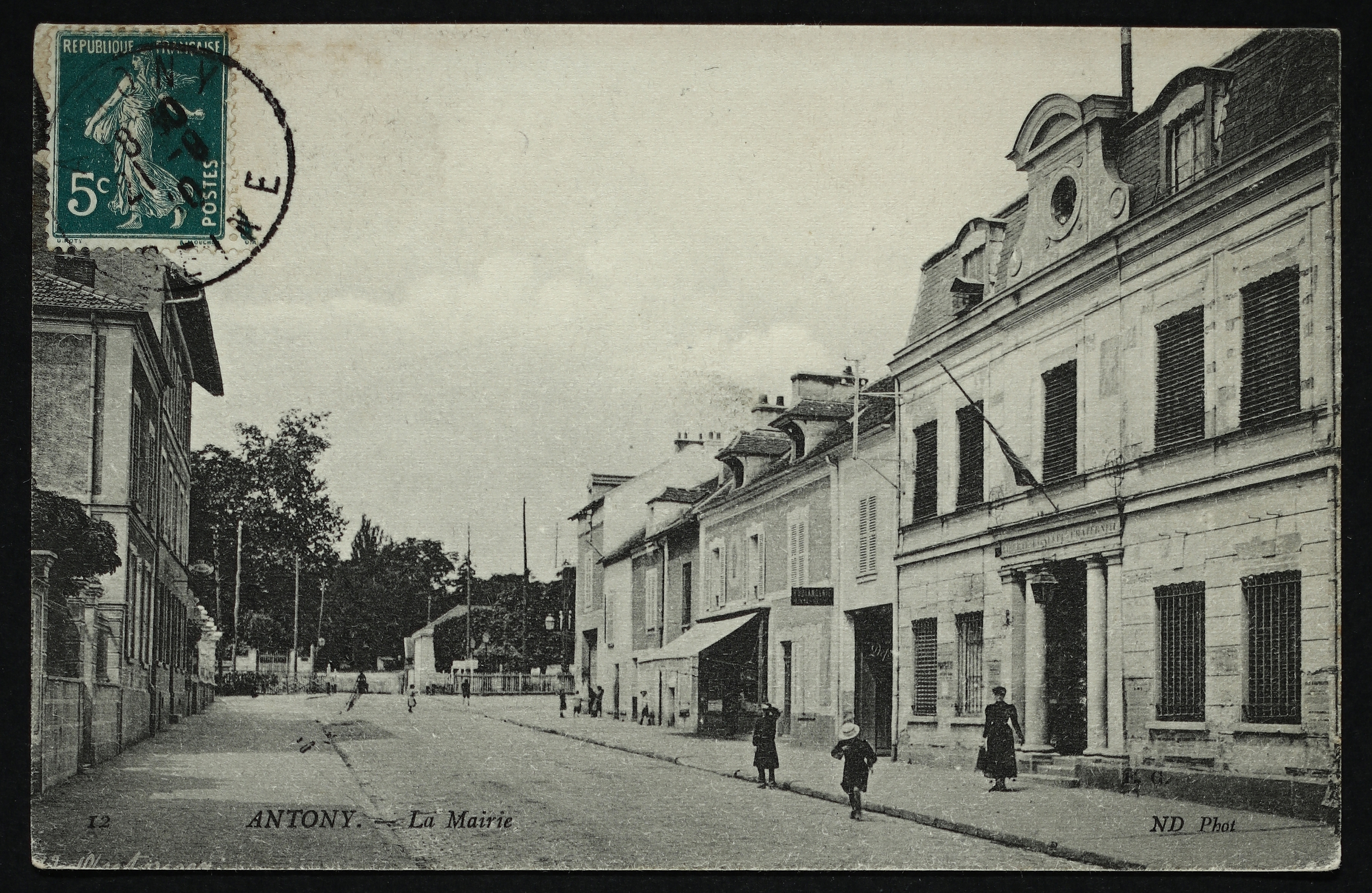
The town hall on Rue de la Gare

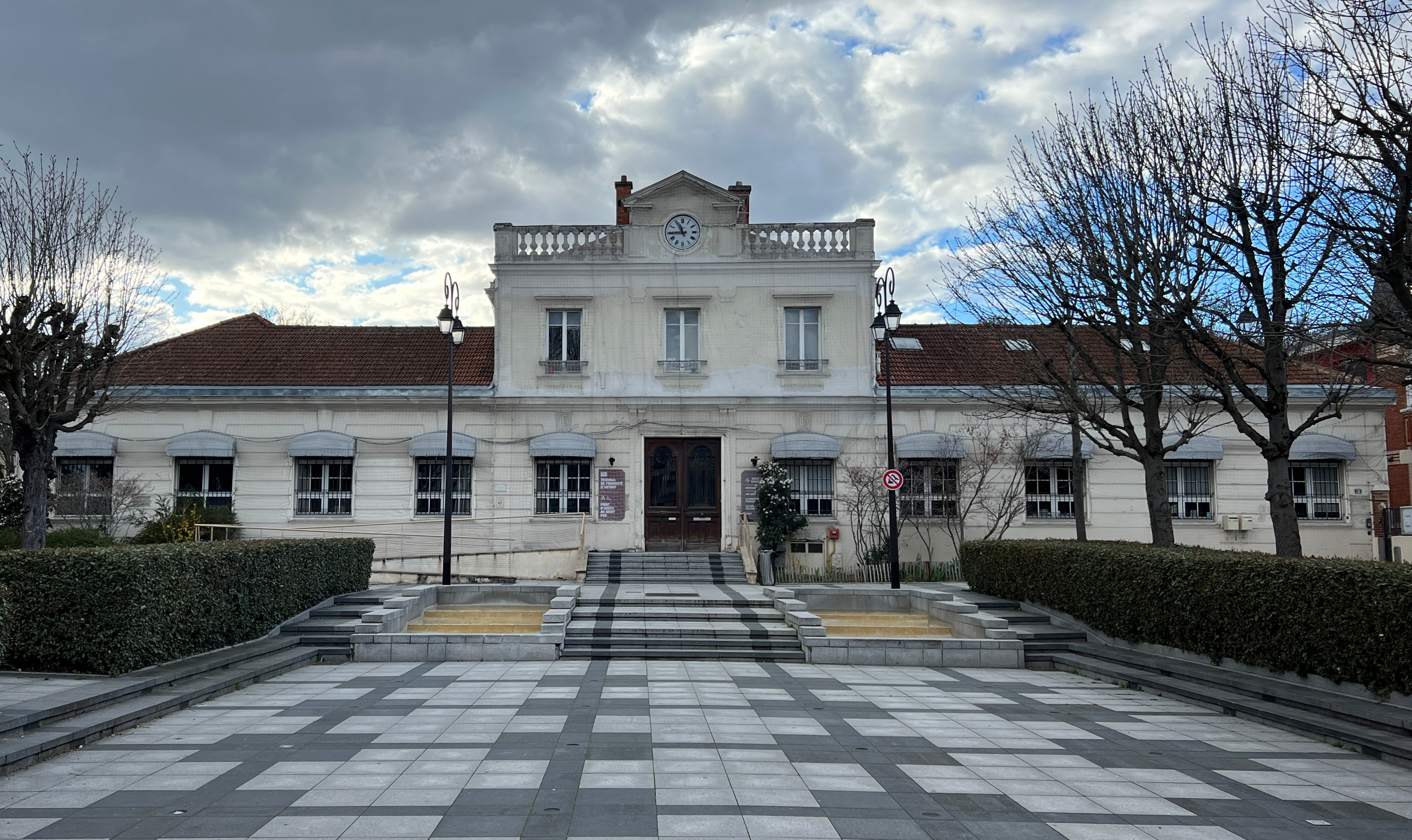
The town hall in the Market Square

Following the French Revolution, the new town council established an office in a building near the Church of Saint-Saturnin: this served as the Maison Commune until the council moved to a purpose-built town hall on Rue de la Gare (now Rue Auguste-Mounié) in 1835. The new building was designed by Auguste Molinos in the neoclassical style and built in ashlar stone. The design involved a symmetrical main frontage of five bays facing onto Rue Auguste-Mounié. The central bay featured a recessed opening formed by two pairs of Doric order columns supporting an entablature. The building was fenestrated by casement windows by iron grills on the ground floor, by plain casement windows on the first floor, and by an oculus supported by scrolls and surmounted by a segmental pediment at attic level. There were also two dormer windows at attic level. Internally, it accommodated a school as well as the municipal offices. The building was enlarged to a design by Sieur Barbier in 1881, and after the town council relocated, it was converted into a police station and demolished in 1980. The columns were subsequently integrated into a new building on the same site.

In 1927, the council relocated to the old boys school in the Market Square (now Place Auguste Mounié). The school was designed by Sieur Lequeux in the neoclassical style, built in ashlar stone and was completed in 1872. The design involved a symmetrical main frontage of 11 bays facing onto the Market Square. The central section of three bays had two storeys, while the wings of four bays each were single storey. The building was fenestrated by casement windows which were enhanced by cornices on the first floor. The central section featured a doorway with a moulded surround and, at roof level, there was a balustraded parapet broken by a clock with a triangular pediment above the central bay.

During the Paris insurrection, part the Second World War, the town hall was secured by the local liberation committee on 21 August 1944. This was four days in advance of the official liberation of the town by the French 2nd Armoured Division, commanded by General Philippe Leclerc, on 25 August 1944.

In the 1960's, the town council decided to commission a modern town hall. The site they selected was on the west side of Rue de l'Église. The building was designed by Georges Félus in the modern style, built in concrete and glass and was officially opened by the mayor, Georges Suant, on 19 June 1970. The design involved an asymmetrical main frontage of 13 bays facing towards Rue de l'Église. The entrance section, which was slightly to the left of centre, featured a glass doorway on the ground floor and three casement windows on the first floor flanked by full-height pilasters supporting a parapet clad in light grey tiles. The other 10 bays were fenestrated in a similar style and, on either side of the glazed section, there were sections clad in light grey tiles with dark grey bands. Internally, the principal room was the Sale du Conseil (council chamber). A fountain, dating from the 18th century, was installed in front of the town hall at the same time as the building was constructed. Meanwhile, the old town hall in the Market Square was converted to serve as a tax office and later became the Tribunal de Proximité (local courthouse).
