= Hôtel de Ville, Agde =

Town hall in Agde, France

Hôtel de Ville
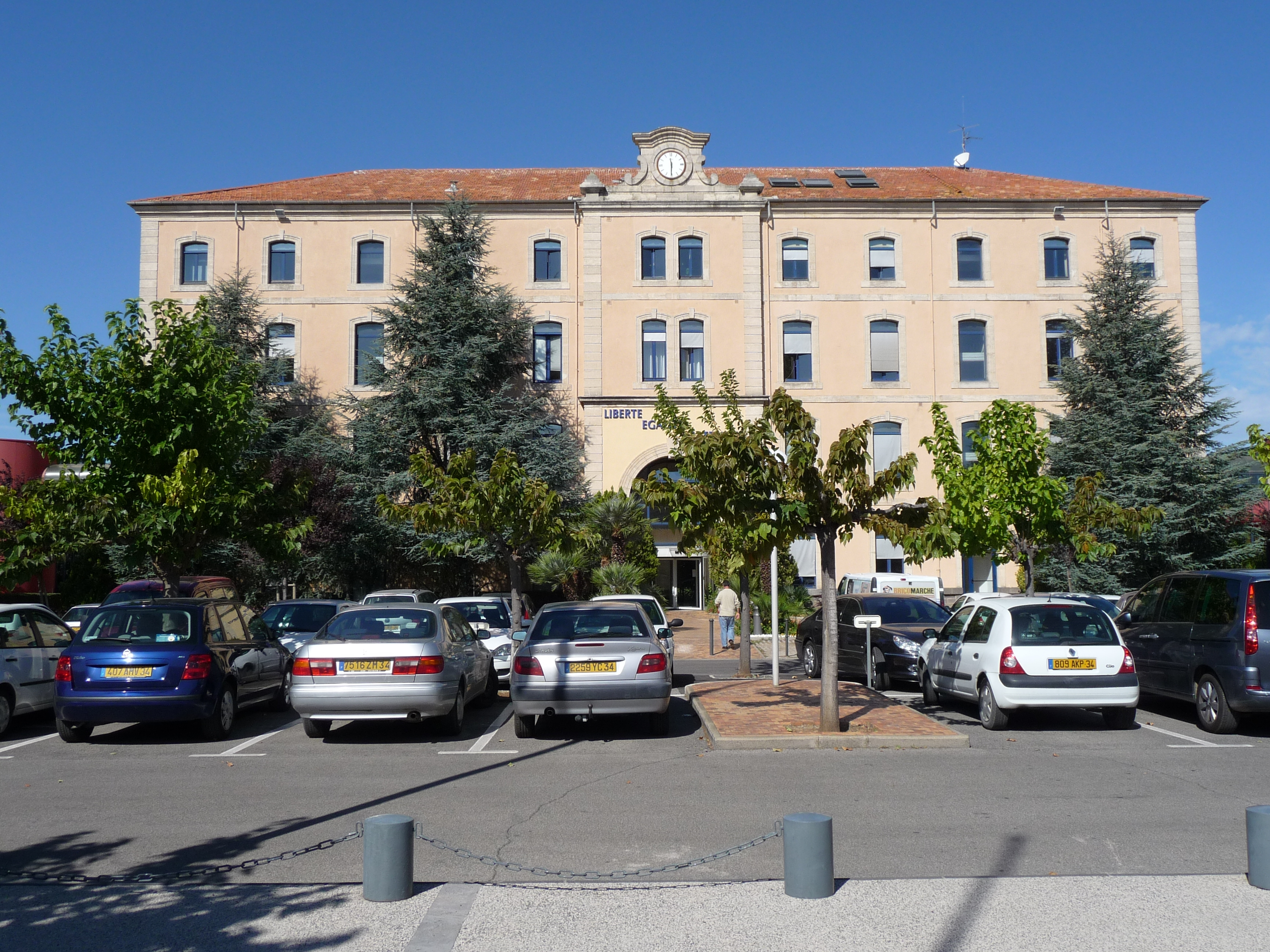
- The main frontage of the Hôtel de Ville in July 2008
- Interactive map of the Hôtel de Ville area

General information
- Type: City hall
- Architectural style: Neoclassical style
- Location: Agde, France
- Coordinates: 43.3133°N 3.4776°E
- Completed: 1892

The Hôtel de Ville (French pronunciation: [otɛl də vil], City Hall) is a municipal building in Agde, Hérault, in southern France, standing on Rue Alsace Lorraine.

== History ==
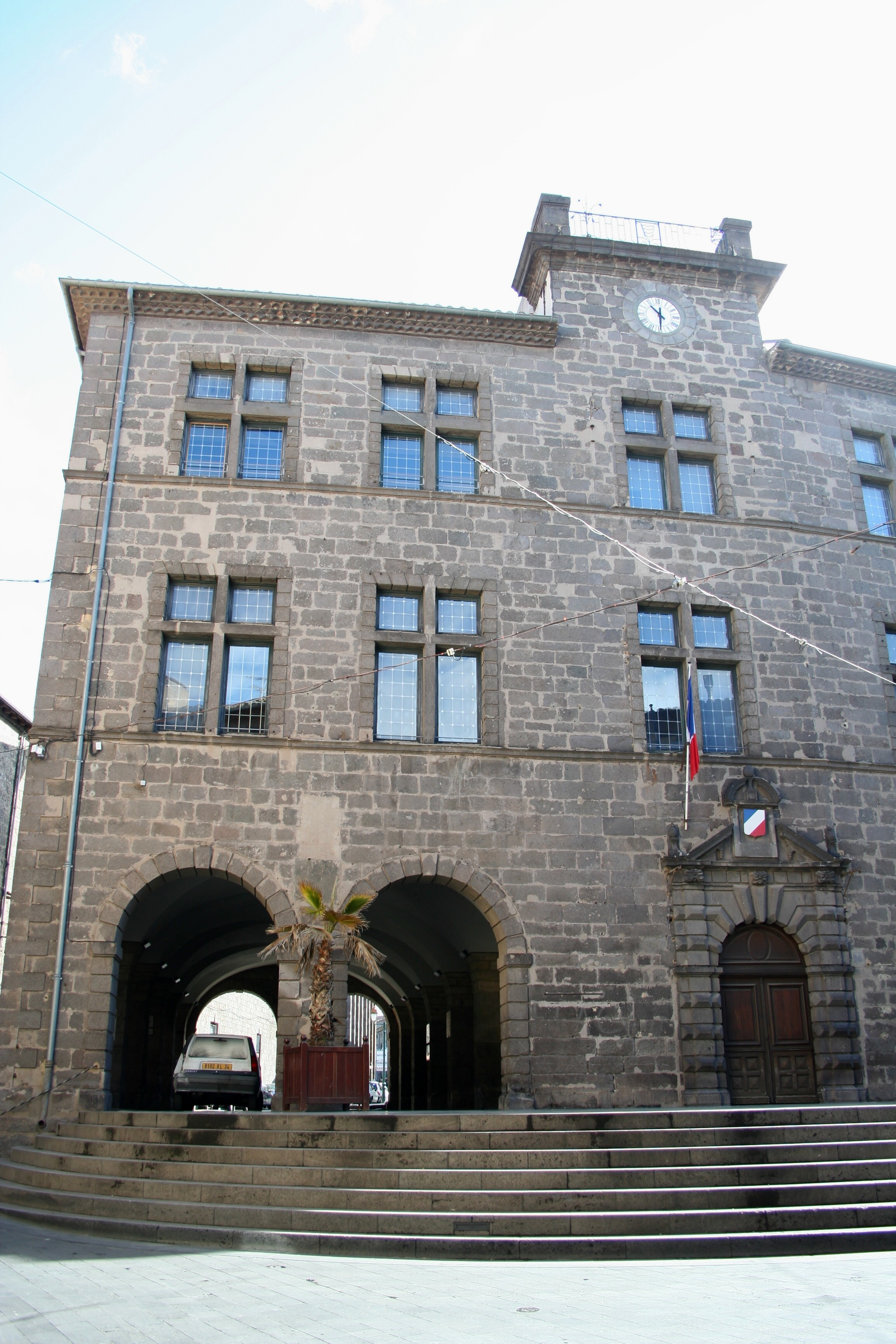
The old town hall

The consuls established their first meeting place close to La Porte de Fer (the Iron Gate) in the 14th century. They relocated to a building on the corner of what is now Rue Perben and Rue Louis Bages in the 16th century. The consuls then decided to establish a purpose-built town hall in the mid-17th century. The site they selected was on the corner of what is now Rue Jean Roger and Rue Louis Bages and they acquired and then demolished several houses on that site to facilitate development. The new building was designed by Jean Cavelier in the Renaissance Revival style, built by Jean Boyer in black basalt and was completed in January 1652.

The design involved an asymmetrical main frontage of four bays facing onto Rue Jean Roger. The first two bays were arcaded so that markets could be held. The third bay featured a rounded headed doorway flanked by pilasters supporting a frieze, which was decorated by three lions' heads, and a pediment, which contained a coat of arms in the tympanum. The right-hand bay contained a smaller doorway with a goods hatch above. The first and second floors were both fenestrated by mullioned and transomed windows and there was a single-stage clock tower above the third bay.

Following the French Revolution, the town hall became the meeting place of the elected town council. Internally, the principal room was the Salle d'Honneur (ceremonies room) which was used for weddings and, in 1939, it was decorated by Catalans fleeing from the Spanish Civil War. During the liberation of the town on 21 August 1944, part of the Second World War, the French Resistance seized control of the town hall. After the building was no longer required for municipal services, it became the civil registry office.

In the mid-1980s, following significant population growth, the council led by the mayor, Pierre Leroy-Beaulieu, decided to establish a more substantial town hall. The building they selected was the Mirabel Barracks in the central part of the town. The barracks were commissioned in the wake of the Franco-Prussian War of 1870. They were designed in the neoclassical style, built in brick with a cement render finish and were completed in 1892.

The design involved a symmetrical main frontage of 11 bays facing onto what is now Rue Alsace Lorraine. The central bay, which was slightly projected forward, featured a double-height round headed opening on the ground floor, and pairs of segmental headed windows with keystones on the second and third floors. The central bay was surmounted by a pediment with a clock in the tympanum and was flanked by quoins surmounted at roof level by finials. There were also quoins at the corners of the building. The other bays were all fenestrated by segmental headed windows with keystones.

The building served as accommodation for the 17th Infantry Regiment. During the revolt of the Languedoc winegrowers in June 1907, the regiment mutinied and joined the local wine growers. After the barracks fell vacant, they were put up for sale by the French Government in 1982 and acquired by the council. After conversion for municipal use, the building was officially re-opened by Minister of the Interior, Charles Pasqua, on 11 May 1987.
