= Hôtel de Ville, Valence =

Town hall in Valence, France

Hôtel de Ville
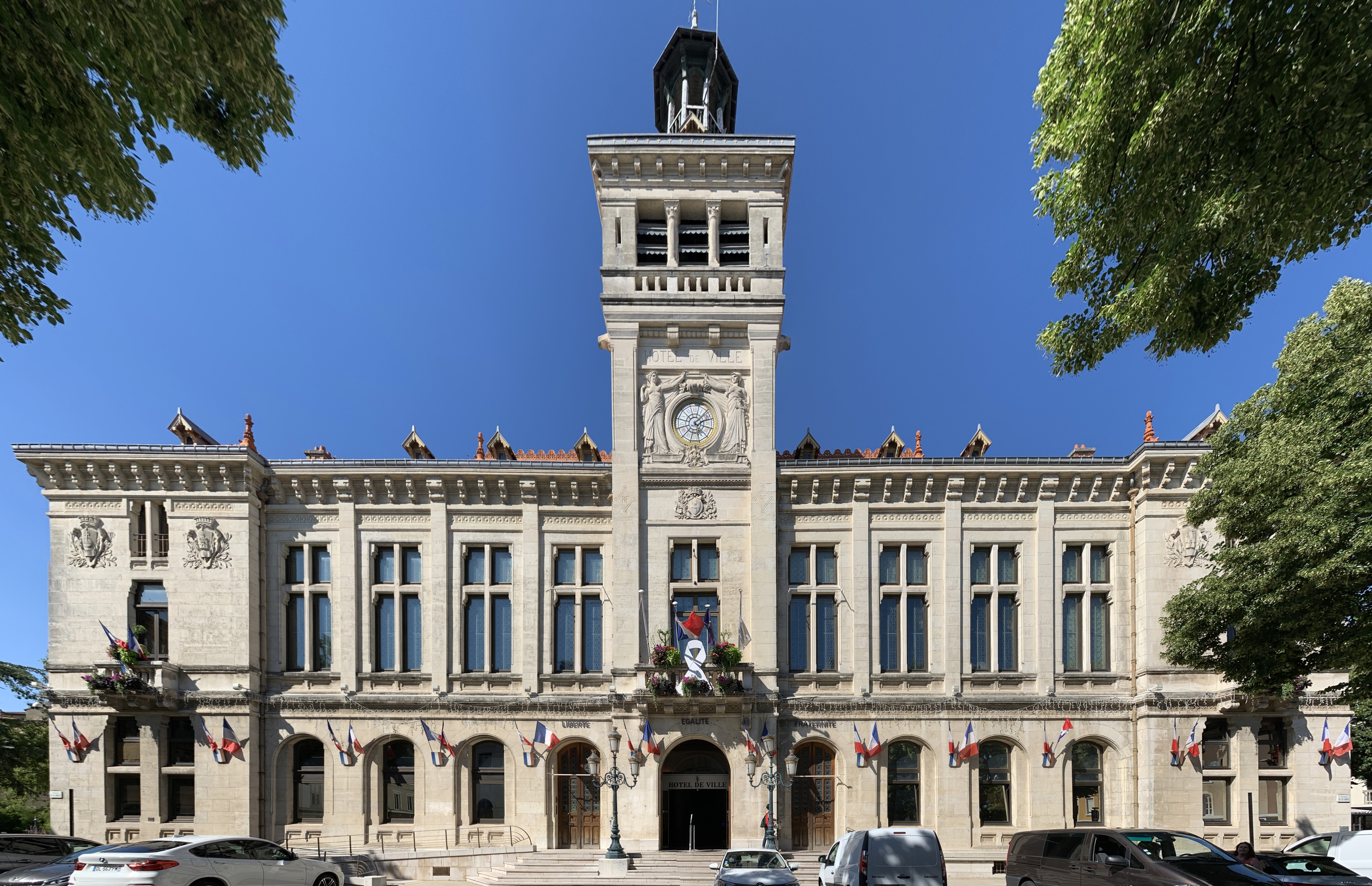
- The main frontage of the Hôtel de Ville in July 2021

General information
- Type: City hall
- Architectural style: Neoclassical style
- Location: Valence, France
- Coordinates: 44.9333°N 4.8921°E
- Completed: 1894

Design and construction
- Architects: Henri Édouard Bertsch-Proust and Paul Bischoff

Monument historique
- Official name: Hôtel de ville
- Type: Inscrit
- Designated: 2018
- Reference no.: PA26000034

The Hôtel de Ville (French pronunciation: [otɛl də vil], City Hall) is a municipal building in Valence, Drôme, southeast France, standing on Place de la Liberté. It was designated a monument historique by the French government in 2018.

== History ==
In the Middle Ages the aldermen met in the Maison de la Confrérie (the House of the Brotherhood). After that building had been demolished in the 13th century, they relocated to Maison Saint-Antoine on Rue Saint-Félix, and, then from 1793, they used part of the old Saint-Ruf Abbey, which had been confiscated by the state during the French Revolution. In 1808, Napoleon granted the council the right to use the Convent of Sainte Marie in the old town.

In the late 1880s, after the convent became very dilapidated, the local council led by the mayor, Maurice Clerc, decided to commission a dedicated town hall. The proposed building formed part of a much wider project to regenerate Valence. Although they did consider sites in the new and expanding areas of the town, they ultimately decided to demolish the convent and build on that site. Construction of the new building started in August 1891. It was designed by Henri Édouard Bertsch-Proust and Paul Bischoff in the neoclassical style, built in ashlar stone and was officially opened by the mayor, Jean-François Malizard, on 16 December 1894.

The design involved a symmetrical main frontage of 11 bays facing onto Place de la Liberté with the end pays slightly projected forward. The central bay, which was also slightly projected forward, featured a four-stage tower. There was a round headed doorway in the first stage, a tall cross-window with a balustraded balcony in the second stage, a clock flanked by finely carved statues in the third stage and three openings with louvres separated by Corinthian order columns in the fourth stage. The tower was surmounted by a modillioned cornice and a belfry. The wings of four bays each were fenestrated by round headed windows on the ground floor, and by cross-windows on the first floor: the cross-windows were separated by pilasters supporting a modillioned cornice. The end bays were fenestrated by paired windows with ogee heads on the ground floor and by single windows with ogee heads on the first floor. The carved statues flanking the clock, representing law and universal suffrage, were carved by Thomas Lamotte from Lyon.

Internally, the principal rooms were the Salle du Conseil (the council chamber), the Salle des Mariages (the wedding hall) and the Salle du Tambour (the drum hall). These were decorated to a design by Eugène Viollet-le-Duc. The Salle des Mariages featured fine paintings by Louis Ollier depicting Le Printemps de la vie (the Springtime of Life), and Cortège Nuptial (Wedding Procession).

The rock climber, Alain Robert, climbed the building without a rope in 1998. A major programme of restoration works costing €620,000 was initiated in 2015. The work, which involved remedial works to the staircase and the principal reception rooms, was undertaken to a design by RL&A Architects and was completed in 2019.
