= Hôtel de Ville, Cayenne =

Town hall in Cayenne, French Guiana

Hôtel de Ville
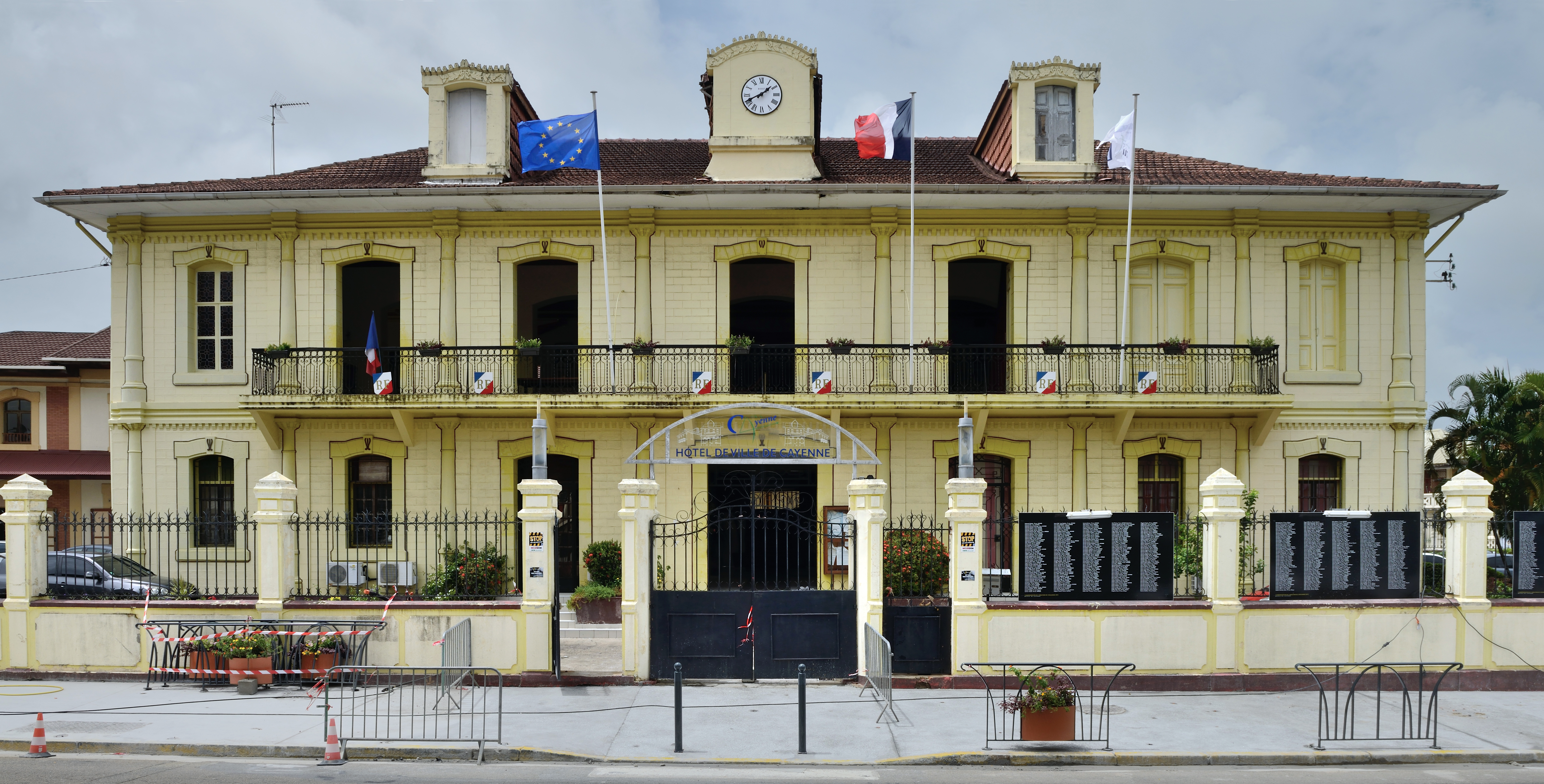
- The main frontage of the Hôtel de Ville in March 2013
- Interactive map of the Hôtel de Ville area

General information
- Type: City hall
- Architectural style: Neoclassical style
- Location: Cayenne, French Guiana
- Coordinates: 4.9382°N 52.3350°W
- Completed: 1924

The Hôtel de Ville (French pronunciation: [otɛl də vil], City Hall) is a municipal building in Cayenne, French Guiana, on the northern coast of South America, standing on Rue de Rémire. It has been included on the Inventaire général des monuments by the French Ministry of Culture since 2002.

== History ==
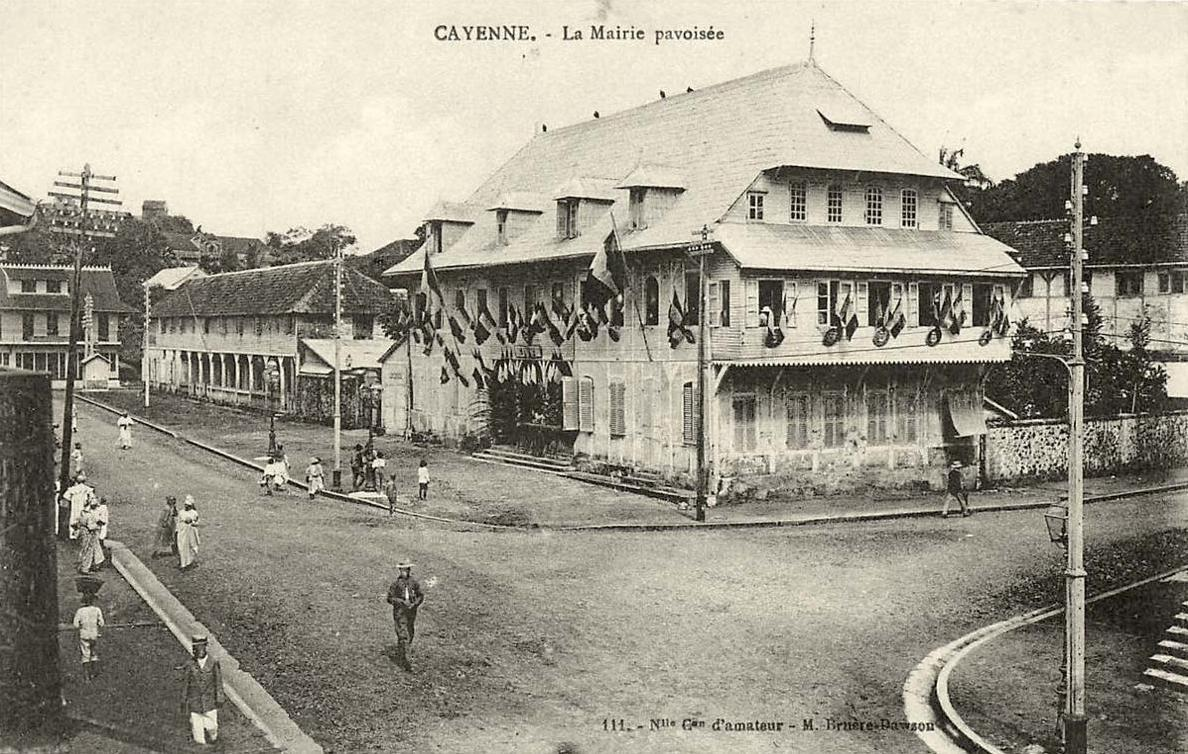
The old timber-framed town hall on Rue de Rémire

The first town hall in Cayenne was a building known as Maison Ceïde on what is now Avenue du Général de Gaulle. It was built using timber frame construction techniques and was completed in the 18th century. The original structure evolved and, by 1842, involved a symmetrical main frontage consisting of a main block and two square-shaped pavilions facing onto Avenue du Général de Gaulle. The main block featured a large round headed opening in the centre bay allowing access to a courtyard at the centre of the building. The first floor was fronted by a covered walkway which connected the two pavilions, and which was jettied out over the pavement. There was a second floor which was fenestrated by five casement windows. The building had been the home of a wealthy gold merchant, Victor Ceïde, and, after it ceased serving as the town hall, it became a small shopping centre known as the Galerie des Trois-Fontaines (Gallery of the Three Fountains). The name of the shopping centre recalls the fountains which first provided fresh water to local people from a reservoir on Mount Cépérou in 1867. One of these fountains was located in the courtyard within the building.

In the late 19th century, the town council decided to relocate to a more substantial building. The building they selected was the old quartermaster's office on Rue de Rémire, a short distance to the southwest of the first town hall. The design involved a symmetrical main frontage of eleven bays facing onto Rue de Rémire. The central three bays were recessed on the ground floor and contained a doorway. The building was fenestrated by a mixture of square-headed and round headed windows. The ground floor windows were equipped with shutters and there were four dormer windows at attic level.

Following rapid population growth in the early 20th century, the town council led by the mayor, Eugène Gober, decided to demolish the timber-framed town hall on Rue de Rémire and to erect a brick building on the same site. While the construction works were ongoing, the council established its offices in temporary accommodation at Maison Vitalo, on the corner of Rue Arago and Rue Barrat. The new building was designed in the neoclassical style, built in brick with a cement render under the supervision of the assistant engineer of public works, Paul Amusant, and was completed in 1924. The design involved a symmetrical main frontage of seven bays facing onto Rue de Rémire. The central bay featured a segmental headed doorway with a stone surround and a keystone. The other bays on the ground floor and all the bays on the first floor were fenestrated by casement windows with stone surrounds and keystones. There was a balcony with iron railings in front of the central five bays, a clock above the central bay, and two dormer windows at attic level. Internally, the principal rooms were the Bureaux de Maire (mayor's office) on the ground floor and the Salle du Conseil (council chamber) on the first floor.

== Sources ==
- Lentin, Toussaint (2017). Kalichat Ti nègre, village chinois. Société des écrivains. ISBN 978-2342154764.
