= Belfries of Belgium and France =

UNESCO World Heritage Site

UNESCO World Heritage Site
- Belfry locations
- Interactive map of Belfries of Belgium and France
- Location: Belgium; north of France
- Includes: 56 belfries
- Criteria: Cultural: (ii), (iv)
- Reference: 943
- Inscription: 1999 (23rd Session)
- Extensions: 2005

The Belfries of Belgium and France are a group of 56 historical buildings designated by UNESCO as World Heritage Sites, in recognition of the civic (rather than church) belfries serving as an architectural manifestation of emerging civic independence from feudal and religious influences in the former County of Flanders (present-day French Flanders area of France and Flanders region of Belgium) and neighbouring areas which once were possessions of the House of Burgundy (in present-day Wallonia of Belgium).

== Inscription ==
The World Heritage Site was originally called the Belfries of Flanders and Wallonia, a 1999 UNESCO list of 32 towers in those two regions of Belgium. In 2005, the list was expanded and given its current name, recognizing the addition of 23 belfries from the Nord-Pas-de-Calais and Picardy regions in the north-eastern tip of France, plus the belfry of Gembloux in Wallonia.

== Included structures ==
Despite the list being concerned with civic tower structures, it includes six Belgian church towers (note the "cathedral"s, "church"es and "basilica" in the list below) under the pretext that they had served as watchtowers or alarm bell towers.

Most of the structures in this list are towers projecting from larger buildings. However, a few are notably standalone, of which, a handful are rebuilt towers formerly connected to adjacent buildings. One notable omission may seem the tower of Brussels' Town Hall, but this is not an actual belfry. The original Belfry of Brussels was located next to the Church of St. Nicholas, until its collapse in 1714. As a side note, Brussels' Town Hall is part of the Grand-Place World Heritage Site.

== List of belfries ==
Name and location	Municipality	Province (BE) / Department (FR)	Region	Country	Year inscribed	UNESCO ID
Schepenhuis, Aalst – Belfry and (Former) City Hall; 50°56′19″N 4°02′19″E	Aalst	East Flanders	Flanders	Belgium	1999	943-001
Cathedral of Our Lady; 51°13′14″N 4°24′02″E	Antwerp	Antwerp	Flanders	Belgium	1999	943-002
City Hall of Antwerp (Note: "The Hôtel de Ville in Antwerpen (1564) is an excellent example of the transposition of Renaissance principles in the central risalith with superposed diminishing registers flanked by obelisks and scrollwork and finished with a pediment, reiterating the theme of the central belfry." – Hôtel de Ville is French for 'City Hall', Antwerpen is the native name of 'Antwerp' in Dutch."); 51°13′17″N 4°23′51″E	Antwerp	Antwerp	Flanders	Belgium	1999	943-003
Hallentoren belfry and halls of Bruges; 51°12′30″N 3°13′29″E	Bruges	West Flanders	Flanders	Belgium	1999	943-004
City Hall with Belfry of Dendermonde; 51°01′52″N 4°05′55″E	Dendermonde	East Flanders	Flanders	Belgium	1999	943-005
City Hall and Belfry of Diksmuide; 51°02′01″N 2°51′52″E	Diksmuide	West Flanders	Flanders	Belgium	1999	943-006
City Hall with Belfry of Eeklo; 51°11′05″N 3°33′59″E	Eeklo	East Flanders	Flanders	Belgium	1999	943-007
Belfry, Cloth Hall and Mammelokker of Ghent; 51°03′13″N 3°43′29″E	Ghent	East Flanders	Flanders	Belgium	1999	943-008
Former City Hall & Lakenhal (cloth hall) of Herentals; 51°10′37″N 4°50′11″E	Herentals	Antwerp	Flanders	Belgium	1999	943-009
Cloth Hall and Belfry of Ypres; 50°51′04″N 2°53′08″E	Ypres	West Flanders	Flanders	Belgium	1999	943-010
Belfry of Kortrijk; 50°49′39″N 3°15′56″E	Kortrijk	West Flanders	Flanders	Belgium	1999	943-011
Belfry of St. Peter's Church and Tower; 50°52′47″N 4°42′03″E	Leuven	Flemish Brabant	Flanders	Belgium	1999	943-012
City Hall and Belfry Tower of Lier; 51°07′52″N 4°34′12″E	Lier	Antwerp	Flanders	Belgium	1999	943-013
Town Hall with Belfry of Lo-Reninge; 50°58′50″N 2°44′58″E	Lo-Reninge	West Flanders	Flanders	Belgium	1999	943-014
Old Cloth Hall with Belfry (now part of the modern City Hall complex) (Note: UNESCO states, inappropriately in French: ID 943-015 Ancienne Halle avec Beffroi; in native Dutch language this is Oude [or: Voormalige] Halle met Belfort. This 14th-century Cloth Hall with never to its designed height built Belfry – both hardly ever used for the intended purposes – with more recent adjacent buildings, constitute the present-day City Hall.); 51°01′41″N 4°28′53″E	Mechelen	Antwerp	Flanders	Belgium	1999	943-015
St. Rumbolds Tower of the Cathedral (Note: UNESCO states, inappropriately in French: ID 943-016 Tour de Saint-Rombaut ; in native Dutch language this is Sint-Romboutstoren which is the main tower of the cathedral, once also used as a watchtower against fires.); 51°01′44″N 4°28′42″E	Mechelen	Antwerp	Flanders	Belgium	1999	943-016
City Hall and Adjacent Belfry of Menen; 50°47′46″N 3°07′14″E	Menen	West Flanders	Flanders	Belgium	1999	943-017
Stadshalle Grain Hall (Market Hall) with Belfry of Nieuwpoort; 51°07′45″N 2°45′08″E	Nieuwpoort	West Flanders	Flanders	Belgium	1999	943-018
Town Hall of with Belfry of Oudenaarde; 50°50′38″N 3°36′14″E	Oudenaarde	East Flanders	Flanders	Belgium	1999	943-019
City Hall, Stadshalle (market hall), and Belfry of Roeselare; 50°56′41″N 3°07′28″E	Roeselare	West Flanders	Flanders	Belgium	1999	943-020
City Hall with Tower of Sint-Truiden; 50°48′56″N 5°11′10″E	Sint-Truiden	Limburg	Flanders	Belgium	1999	943-021
Hallentoren belfry, Cloth Hall and Aldermen's Chamber (Note: The belfry is known as Hallentoren or Tower of the Halls, plural: of the two adjacent wings or halls, only one remains, hence Cloth Hall, singular.); 51°00′02″N 3°19′37″E	Tielt	West Flanders	Flanders	Belgium	1999	943-022
St. Germanus Church with Stadstoren (City Tower); 50°48′21″N 4°56′20″E	Tienen	Flemish Brabant	Flanders	Belgium	1999	943-023
Belfry of the Basilica of Our Lady with Stadstoren (City Tower); 50°46′51″N 5°27′52″E	Tongeren	Limburg	Flanders	Belgium	1999	943-024
Landhuis ("country-house", former seat of the Viscounty of Veurne-Ambacht) and Belfry (Note: The city centre's Landhuis (literally: 'country-house') was once the seat of the kasselrij or burggraafschap (viscounty) Veurne-Ambacht, serving the countryside; here as opposed to the adjacent Stadhuis (literally: 'city-house' though always meaning the City Hall) serving the city. The Landhuis later became the Court of Justice and recently a place for cultural purposes, e.g. exhibitions, dance acts, concerts, etc.); 51°04′22″N 2°39′42″E	Veurne	West Flanders	Flanders	Belgium	1999	943-025
St. Leonard's Church; 50°50′00″N 5°06′11″E	Zoutleeuw	Flemish Brabant	Flanders	Belgium	1999	943-026
Belfry of the City Hall of Binche; 50°24′39″N 4°09′56″E	Binche	Hainaut	Wallonia	Belgium	1999	943-027
Belfry of the City Hall of Charleroi; 50°24′45″N 4°26′38″E	Charleroi	Hainaut	Wallonia	Belgium	1999	943-028
Belfry of Mons; 50°27′15″N 3°57′00″E	Mons	Hainaut	Wallonia	Belgium	1999	943-029
Belfry of Namur; 50°27′50″N 4°52′01″E	Namur	Namur	Wallonia	Belgium	1999	943-030
Belfry of Thuin; 50°20′23″N 4°17′15″E	Thuin	Hainaut	Wallonia	Belgium	1999	943-031
Belfry of Tournai; 50°36′21″N 3°23′17″E	Tournai	Hainaut	Wallonia	Belgium	1999	943-032
Belfry of the City Hall of Armentières; 50°41′11″N 2°52′57″E	Armentières	Nord	Hauts-de-France	France	2005	943-033
Belfry of the City Hall of Bailleul; 50°44′23″N 2°44′04″E	Bailleul	Nord	Hauts-de-France	France	2005	943-034
Belfry of Bergues; 50°58′05″N 2°25′58″E	Bergues	Nord	Hauts-de-France	France	2005	943-035
Belfry of St. Martin's Church; 50°10′27″N 3°13′56″E	Cambrai	Nord	Hauts-de-France	France	2005	943-036
Belfry of the City Hall of Comines; 50°45′55″N 3°00′26″E	Comines	Nord	Hauts-de-France	France	2005	943-037
Belfry of the City Hall of Douai; 50°22′04″N 3°04′50″E	Douai	Nord	Hauts-de-France	France	2005	943-038
Belfry of Dunkirk (Note: UNESCO states: ID 943-040 Beffroi de l'Hôtel de Ville, ID 943-039 Beffroi de l'église Saint-Eloi – further reading from other source: (in French) Monuments in Dunkirk); 51°02′08″N 2°22′35″E	Dunkirk	Nord	Hauts-de-France	France	2005	943-039
Belfry of the City Hall of Dunkirk; 51°02′15″N 2°22′36″E	Dunkirk	Nord	Hauts-de-France	France	2005	943-040
Belfry of Gravelines; 50°59′12″N 2°07′34″E	Gravelines	Nord	Hauts-de-France	France	2005	943-041
Belfry of the City Hall of Lille; 50°37′50″N 3°04′11″E	Lille	Nord	Hauts-de-France	France	2005	943-042
Belfry of the City Hall of Loos; 50°36′54″N 3°00′53″E	Loos	Nord	Hauts-de-France	France	2005	943-043
Belfry of the City Hall of Aire-sur-la-Lys; 50°38′19″N 2°23′47″E	Aire-sur-la-Lys	Pas-de-Calais	Hauts-de-France	France	2005	943-044
Belfry of the City Hall of Arras; 50°17′28″N 2°46′37″E	Arras	Pas-de-Calais	Hauts-de-France	France	2005	943-045
Belfry of Béthune; 50°31′52″N 2°38′21″E	Béthune	Pas-de-Calais	Hauts-de-France	France	2005	943-046
Belfry of the City Hall of Boulogne-sur-Mer; 50°43′30″N 1°36′48″E	Boulogne-sur-Mer	Pas-de-Calais	Hauts-de-France	France	2005	943-047
Belfry of the City Hall of Calais; 50°57′10″N 1°51′15″E	Calais	Pas-de-Calais	Hauts-de-France	France	2005	943-048
Belfry of the City Hall of Hesdin; 50°22′23″N 2°02′11″E	Hesdin	Pas-de-Calais	Hauts-de-France	France	2005	943-049
Belfry of Abbeville; 50°06′26″N 1°49′58″E	Abbeville	Somme	Hauts-de-France	France	2005	943-050
Belfry of Somme; 49°53′44″N 2°17′46″E	Amiens	Somme	Hauts-de-France	France	2005	943-051
Belfry of the former Municipal Hall of Doullens; 50°09′19″N 2°20′28″E	Doullens	Somme	Hauts-de-France	France	2005	943-052
Belfry on the remaining City Gate of Lucheux; 50°11′50″N 2°24′40″E	Lucheux	Somme	Hauts-de-France	France	2005	943-053
Belfry of Rue; 50°16′21″N 1°40′07″E	Rue	Somme	Hauts-de-France	France	2005	943-054
Belfry of Saint-Riquier; 50°08′03″N 1°56′47″E	Saint-Riquier	Somme	Hauts-de-France	France	2005	943-055
Belfry of Gembloux; 50°33′39″N 4°41′35″E	Gembloux	Namur	Wallonia	Belgium	2005	943-056

== See also ==
- List of World Heritage Sites in Belgium
- List of World Heritage Sites in France
