= Comines =

Comines may refer to:

- Comines-Warneton, a town in Hainaut, Belgium
- Comines, Nord, a municipality in the Nord department, France
- Philippe de Commines or de Comines (1447–1511), writer and diplomat in the courts of Burgundy and France
