= Oudenaarde Town Hall =

Town hall in East Flanders, Belgium

- Stadhuis van Oudenaarde (Dutch)
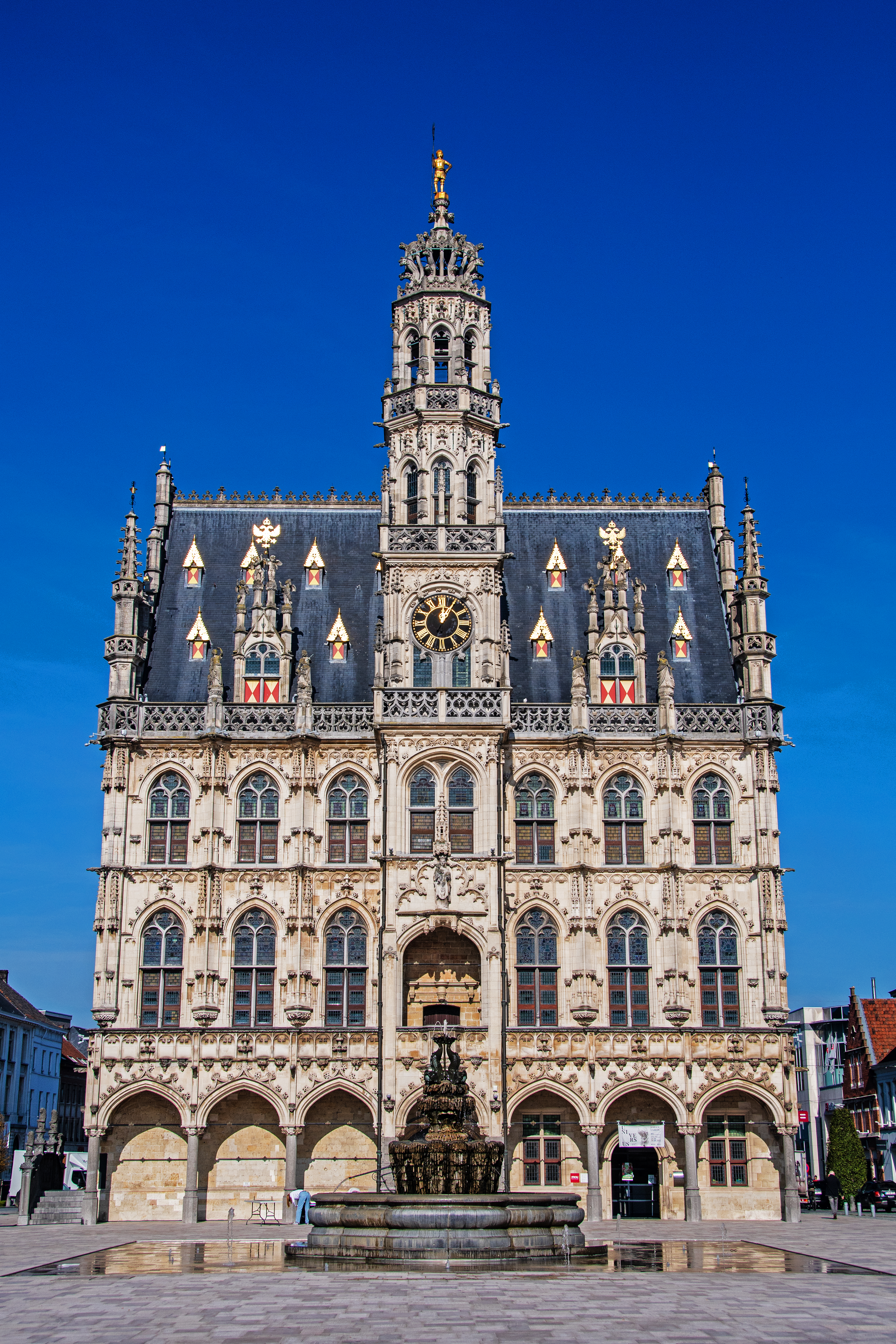
- Oudenaarde's Town Hall
- Interactive map of the Oudenaarde Town Hall area

General information
- Type: Town hall
- Location: Oudenaarde, East Flanders, Belgium
- Coordinates: 50°50′37″N 3°36′14″E

The Town Hall (Dutch: Stadhuis) of Oudenaarde, East Flanders, Belgium, is a landmark building and the seat of that city. Built in a Brabantine late-Gothic style between 1526 and 1537, it is listed as one of the Belfries of Belgium and France, a UNESCO World Heritage Site.

== History ==
The building today known as the Town Hall was built by the architect Hendrik van Pede between 1526 and 1537 to replace the medieval Schepenhuis (Aldermen's House) that occupied the same site. Another older structure, the 14th-century Cloth Hall, was retained and now forms a sort of extension at the back of the Town Hall proper.

In 1999, the Town Hall was inscribed on the UNESCO World Heritage List as part of the Belfries of Belgium and France site, because of its representation of the civic influence of the town and its architecture.

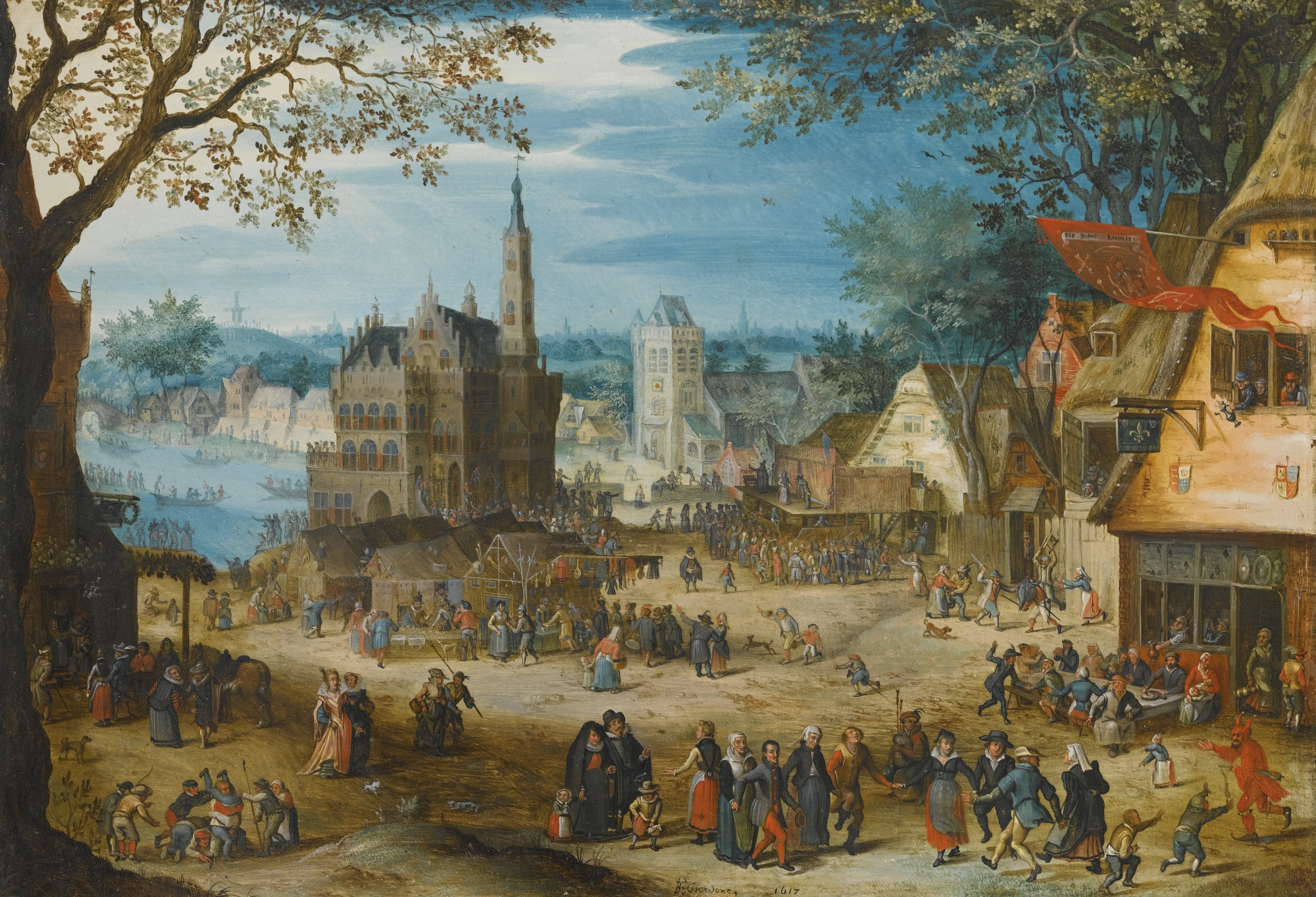
Kermesse of Oudenarde, by Bartholomeus Grondonck, 1617

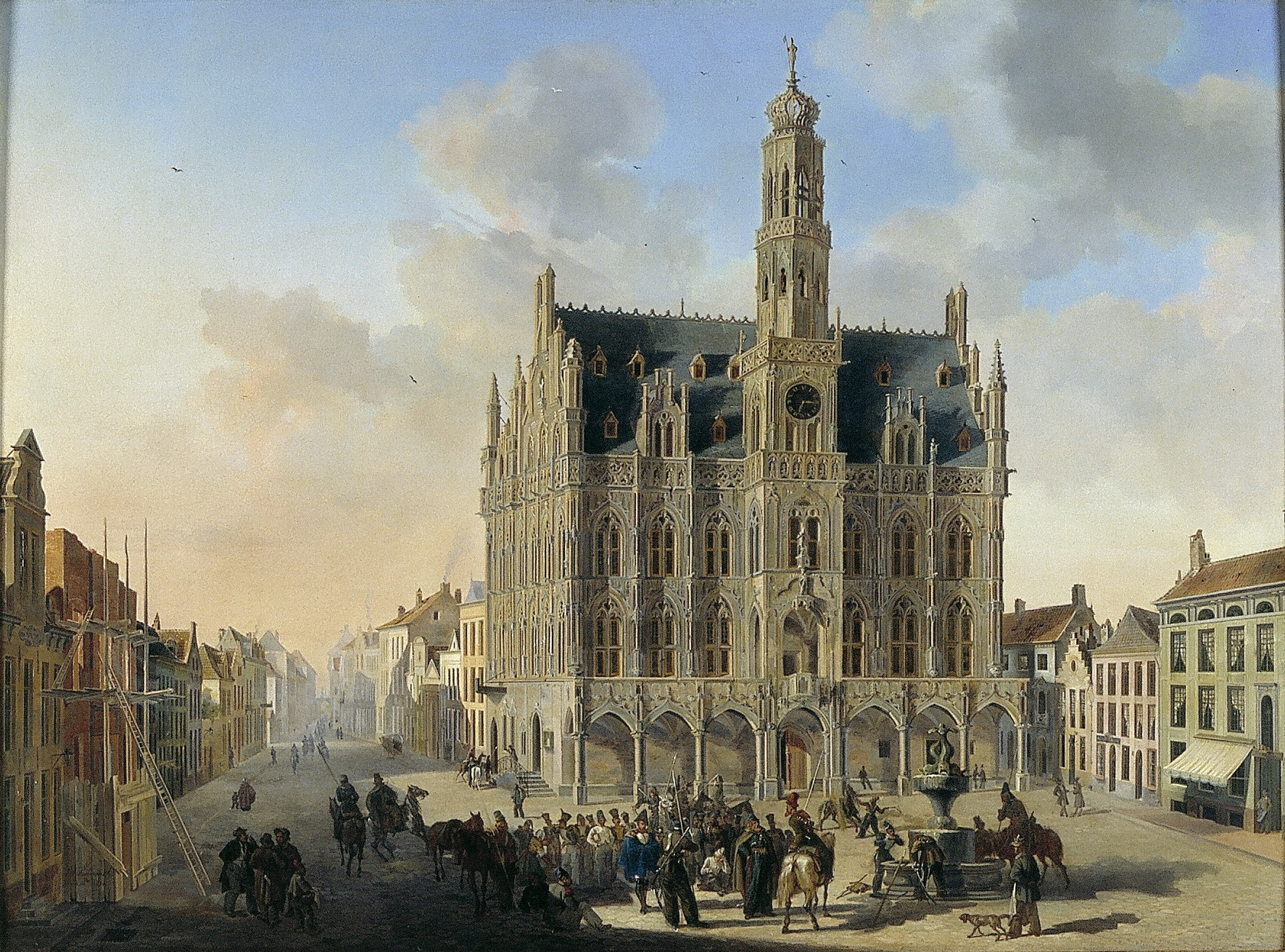
The Town Hall of Oudenaarde, by Pierre François Poelman, 1824

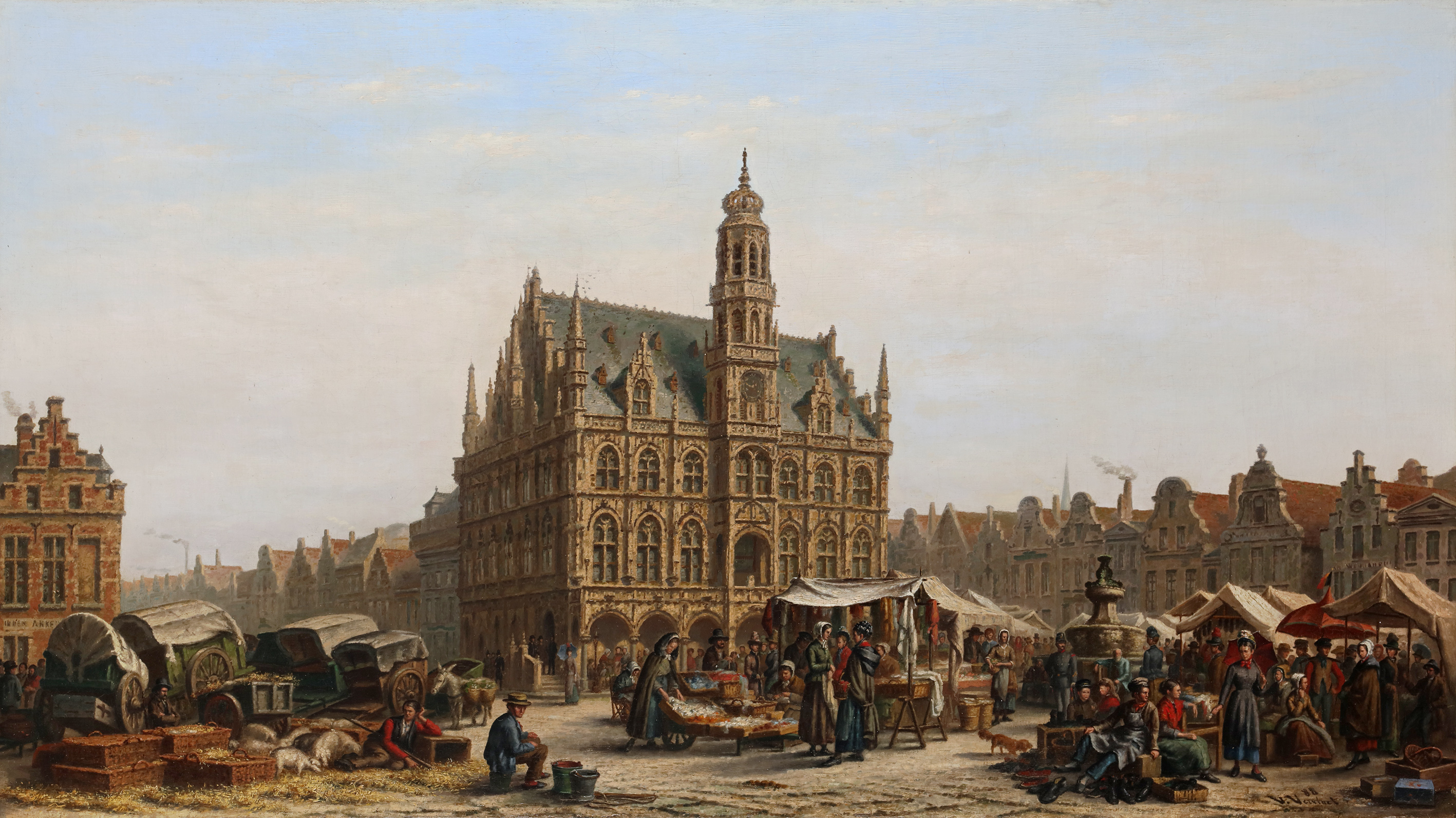
Oudenaarde's Town Hall by Victor Vervloet

== Exterior ==
Oudenaarde's Town Hall was a late flowering of secular Brabantine Gothic architecture, carrying on the stylistic tradition of the town halls at Leuven, Brussels, and Middelburg. Above the ground-story arcade with vaulted ceiling, the building displays typical features of its regional forerunners: a richly decorated facade with pointed-arch windows separated by canopied niches, and a steep, dormered roof surrounded by an openwork parapet. The niches, although designed to contain statues, stand empty.

Atop the central belfry tower of six stories with three terraces, a stone crown supports a gilded brass figure of Hanske de Krijger (Hans the Warrior), mythical guardian of the city. The crown on the tower and the double-headed eagles over the attic windows pay homage to a famous visitor to Oudenaarde, Emperor Charles V, who fathered Margaret of Parma here a few years before construction of the Town Hall began.

== Interior ==
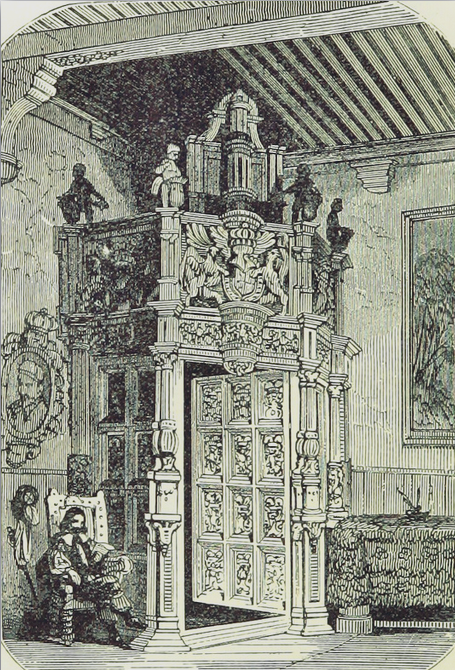
Portal by Pauwel van der Schelden

The Town Hall initially combined functions of government and commerce, with rooms on the ground floor reserved for traders: the Corn House, Weighhouse and Lower Cloth Hall. Today, this floor accommodates the town's tourism office.

On the second floor, an elaborate portal crafted by Pauwel van der Schelden opens into the Schepenzaal, where the aldermen of Oudenaarde convened. The People's Hall takes up the front of the same floor, alongside the terrace overlooking the market square. This was the main room for receptions, banquets and entertainment.

The Town Hall boasts a collection of relics from Oudenaarde's past. The tapestries hanging in the Lower Cloth Hall and the adjacent Cloth Hall building represent an art form that brought the city fame between about the 15th–18th centuries. Another specialty of Oudenaarde during that time was the silversmith's trade, whose wares are displayed in the Silver Room on the third floor. The third floor also houses the Municipal Museum with various local art and artifacts.
