= Bartholomeus Grondonck =

- Born: 1590; Antwerp
- Died: 1630 (aged 39–40); Antwerp

Bartholomeus Grondonck (1590s – 1630s) was a Flemish landscape painter and copyist active in Antwerp in the early 17th century.

== Life and work ==
Very little is known about the life of Grondonck. He is believed to have been born in Antwerp between 1580 and 1600. He is known to have made copies of works by other artists.

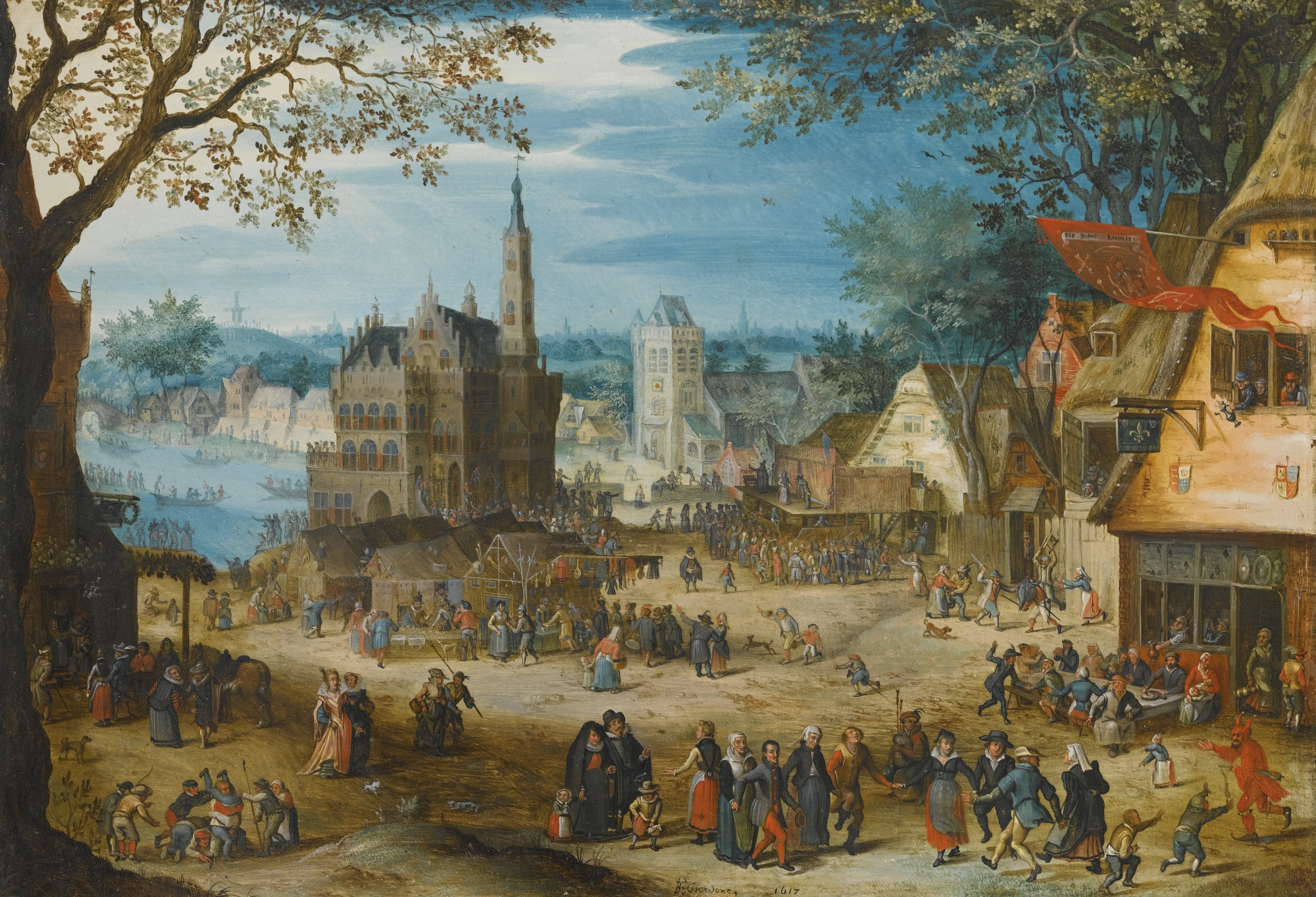
Kermesse of Oudenaarde, 1617

His only known signed painting is the oil on copper painting usually referred to as the Kermesse of Oudenaarde which he painted in 1617 after a 1602 painting by David Vinckboons and a print made by Nicolaes de Bruyn after Vinckboons' work. Grondonck copied many of the figures and groups directly from Vinckboons' original, but deviated from the original composition by giving the figures more space on a wider town square and omitting or adapting the original figures and adding some of his own invention. While the painting is traditionally referred to as the Kermesse of Oudenaarde because the building at the centre resembles the Oudenaarde Town Hall, other titles for the composition are the Peasant's kermesse, a literal translation of the inscription on the red flag, 'Die Boere kermis', and the Kermess of St. Sebastian, as the figure on the same flag may be St. Sebastian.
