= Hôtel de Ville, Armentières =

Town hall in Armentières, France

Hôtel de Ville
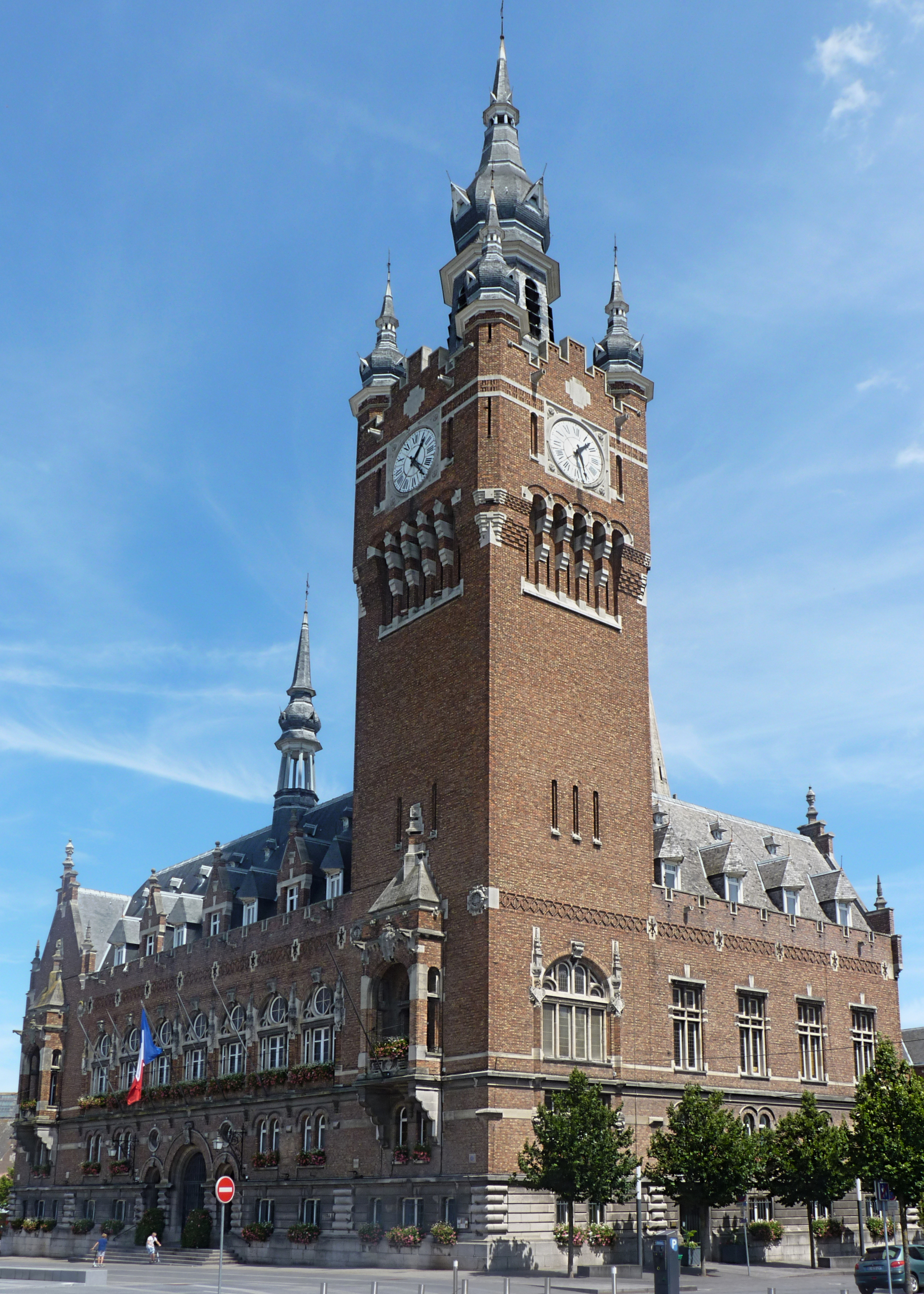
- The main frontage of the Hôtel de Ville in July 2014

General information
- Type: City hall
- Architectural style: Flemish Renaissance Revival style
- Location: Armentières, France
- Coordinates: 50.6867°N 2.8825°E
- Completed: 1934

Height
- Height: 67 metres (220 ft)

Design and construction
- Architects: Louis Marie Cordonnier

UNESCO World Heritage Site
- Part of: Belfries of Belgium and France
- Criteria: Cultural: ii, iv
- Reference: 943
- Inscription: 1999 (23rd Session)

Monument historique
- Official name: Hôtel de ville
- Type: Inscrit
- Designated: 2002
- Reference no.: PA59000085

The Hôtel de Ville (French pronunciation: [otɛl də vil], City Hall) is a municipal building in Armentières, Nord, in northern France, standing on Place du Général de Gaulle. It was designated a monument historique by the French government in 2002.

== History ==
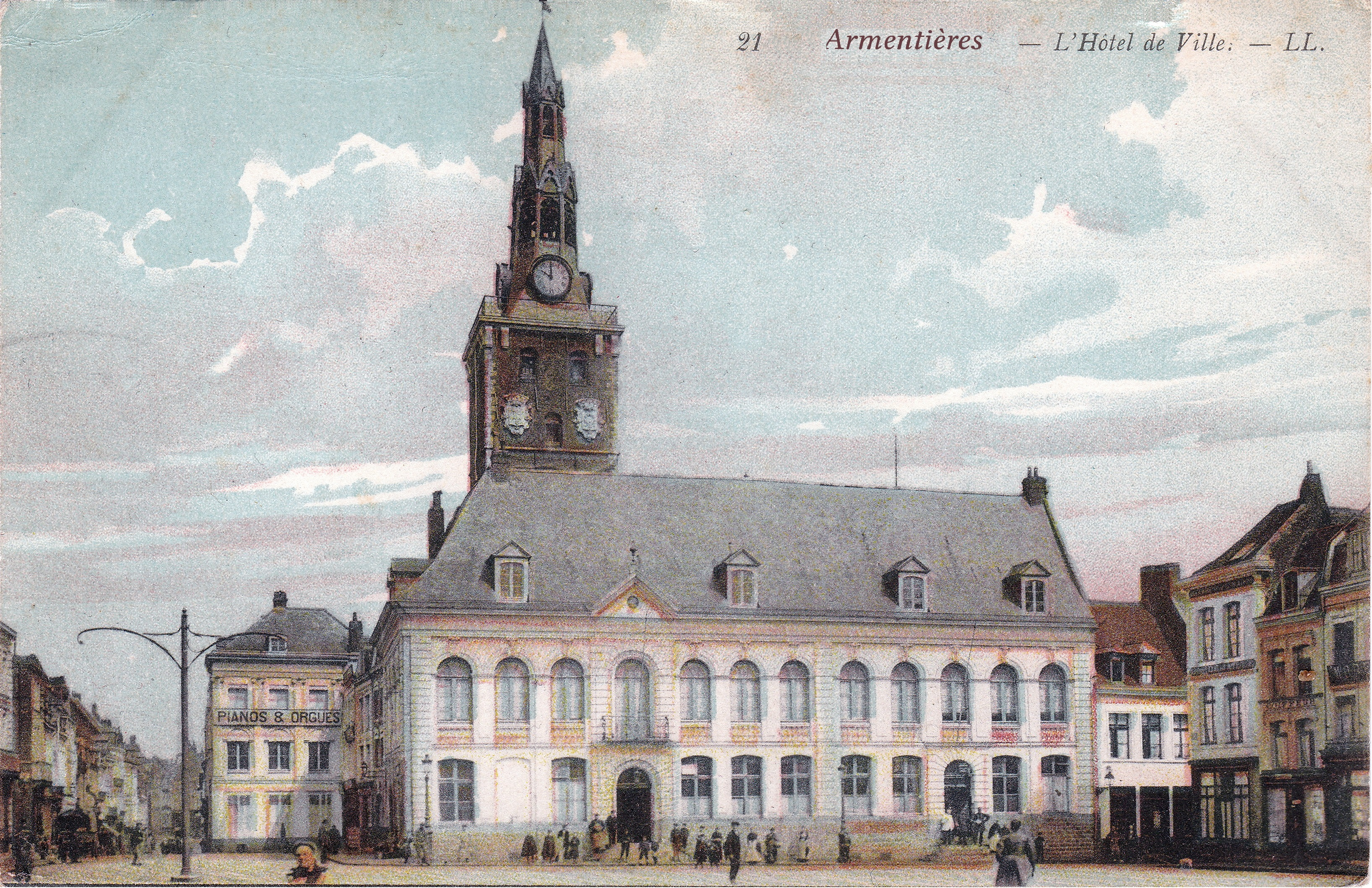
The old town hall

The first town hall, which incorporated a tower, dated back at least to the early 15th century. At that time the town was still part of Flanders and the town hall was burnt down on the orders of Louis XI of France in 1477 during the Burgundian Wars. It was rebuilt in 1490 and, following the annexation of the town by France in 1668, it was remodelled to a design by Paul-Jean Dathis in 1725.

The design involved a main block of 12 bays facing into the Grand Place (now Place du Général de Gaulle) with a square tower behind. The fourth bay on the left was rusticated and contained a round headed doorway on the ground floor, a round headed French door with a balcony on the first floor and a pediment above. The tenth bay also contained a doorway. The rest of the building was fenestrated by segmental headed windows on the ground floor and by round headed windows with moulded surrounds and keystones on the first floor. There were four dormer windows at roof level.

On 10 April 1918, during the Battle of the Lys, part of the First World War, the main part of the town hall was destroyed by the allies as they advanced on the town. The tower survived until October 1918 when it was destroyed by the departing German troops. After the war, the council commissioned a war memorial to commemorate the lives of local people who had died in the war. The site they selected was at the northwestern corner of the Grand Place. It was designed in the form of a steep pyramid, with a figure of a soldier and supporters sculpted by Edgar Boutry, and was unveiled on 5 April 1925.

The council went on to commission a new town hall on the same site. The foundation stone for the new building was laid on 11 November 1925. It was designed by Louis Marie Cordonnier in the Flemish Renaissance Revival style, built in red brick with stone finishings and was officially opened on 10 June 1934.

The design involved an asymmetrical main frontage of nine bays facing onto the Grand Place. The central bay contained a large round headed opening with an iron gate while the bays flanking it contained smaller round headed openings with iron gates. The building was fenestrated by a row of seven mullioned and transomed windows with tracery on the first floor. The left-hand bay contained a pair of round-headed windows on the ground floor, and a niche, which was projected forward and contained a mullioned and transomed window, on the first floor. The right-hand bay contained a four-stage tower which was 67 metres (220 ft) high. The first two stages of the tower were faced in the same style as the first bay; the third stage contained a pair of lancet windows, and the fourth stage contained a clock and was decorated with machicolations at the bottom and crenellations at the top. The tower was surmounted by an octagonal belfry with a dome and a spire. Internally. The principal room was the Salle du Conseil (council chamber) on the first floor.

On 1 September 1944, during the Second World War, the town hall was seized by elements of the French Forces of the Interior and they raised the French tricolour on the building. There was bitter fighting as the German troops retaliated and there were many casualties.

In 2005, the belfry was added to the UNESCO World Heritage List as part of the Belfries of Belgium and France site because of its architecture and historical importance in maintaining municipal power in Europe. Then, in 2013, the tower featured in advertisement for the Oasis soft drink.
