= Hôtel de Ville, Loos =

Town hall in Loos, France

Hôtel de Ville
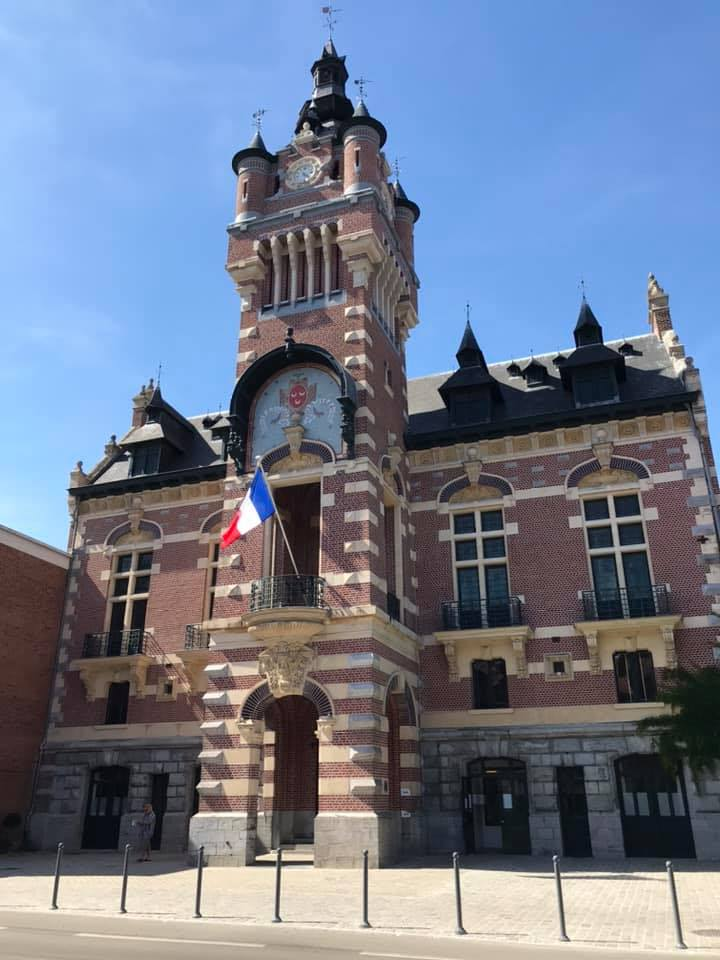
- The main frontage of the Hôtel de Ville in June 2020

General information
- Type: City hall
- Architectural style: Flemish Renaissance Revival style
- Location: Loos, France
- Coordinates: 50.6151°N 3.0148°E
- Completed: 1884

Height
- Height: 38 metres (125 ft)

Design and construction
- Architects: Louis Marie Cordonnier

UNESCO World Heritage Site
- Part of: Belfries of Belgium and France
- Criteria: Cultural: ii, iv
- Reference: 943
- Inscription: 1999 (23rd Session)

Monument historique
- Official name: Hôtel de ville
- Type: Inscrit
- Designated: 2001
- Reference no.: PA59000070

The Hôtel de Ville (French pronunciation: [otɛl də vil], City Hall) is a municipal building in Loos, Nord, in northern France, standing on Rue du Maréchal Foch. It was designated a monument historique by the French government in 2001.

== History ==
Following the French Revolution, the new town council initially met in the clergy house on Sentier de Paris (now Rue Lamartine). In the mid-19th century, after the old clergy house became dilapidated, the council relocated to the Bon Pasteur building on the Grande Rue (now Rue du Maréchal Foch).

However, in August 1880, following significant population growth, the council found the Bon Pasteur building inadequate and decided to commission a purpose-built town hall. The site they selected was open land on the north side of the Grande Rue. The foundation stone for the new building was laid on 14 January 1883. The building was designed by Louis Marie Cordonnier in the Flemish Renaissance Revival style, built in red brick with stone finishings and was officially opened by the mayor, Edouard Billon, on 17 August 1884. This was Cordonnier's first major architectural commission.

The design involved a symmetrical main frontage of five bays facing onto the Grande Rue. The central bay was projected forward to form a five-stage square tower which was 38 metres (125 ft) high. The first stage of the tower contained a vaulted porch with a round headed opening which was surmounted by a mascaron depicting the face of a bearded man. There was a loggia with a semi-circular balcony in the second stage and a mural depicting the municipal coat of arms contained within an arch in the third stage. The fourth stage featured five arrow slots, while the fifth stage contained a clock and was flanked by bartizans at the corners. The tower was surmounted by a lantern, an octagonal belfry and a spire. The outer bays contained segmental headed doorways on the ground floor, mullioned and transomed windows on the first floor, and dormer windows at attic level.

In 2005, the belfry was added to the UNESCO World Heritage List as part of the Belfries of Belgium and France site because of its architecture and historical importance in maintaining municipal power in Europe.
