= Hôtel de Ville, Comines =

Town hall in Comines, France

Hôtel de Ville
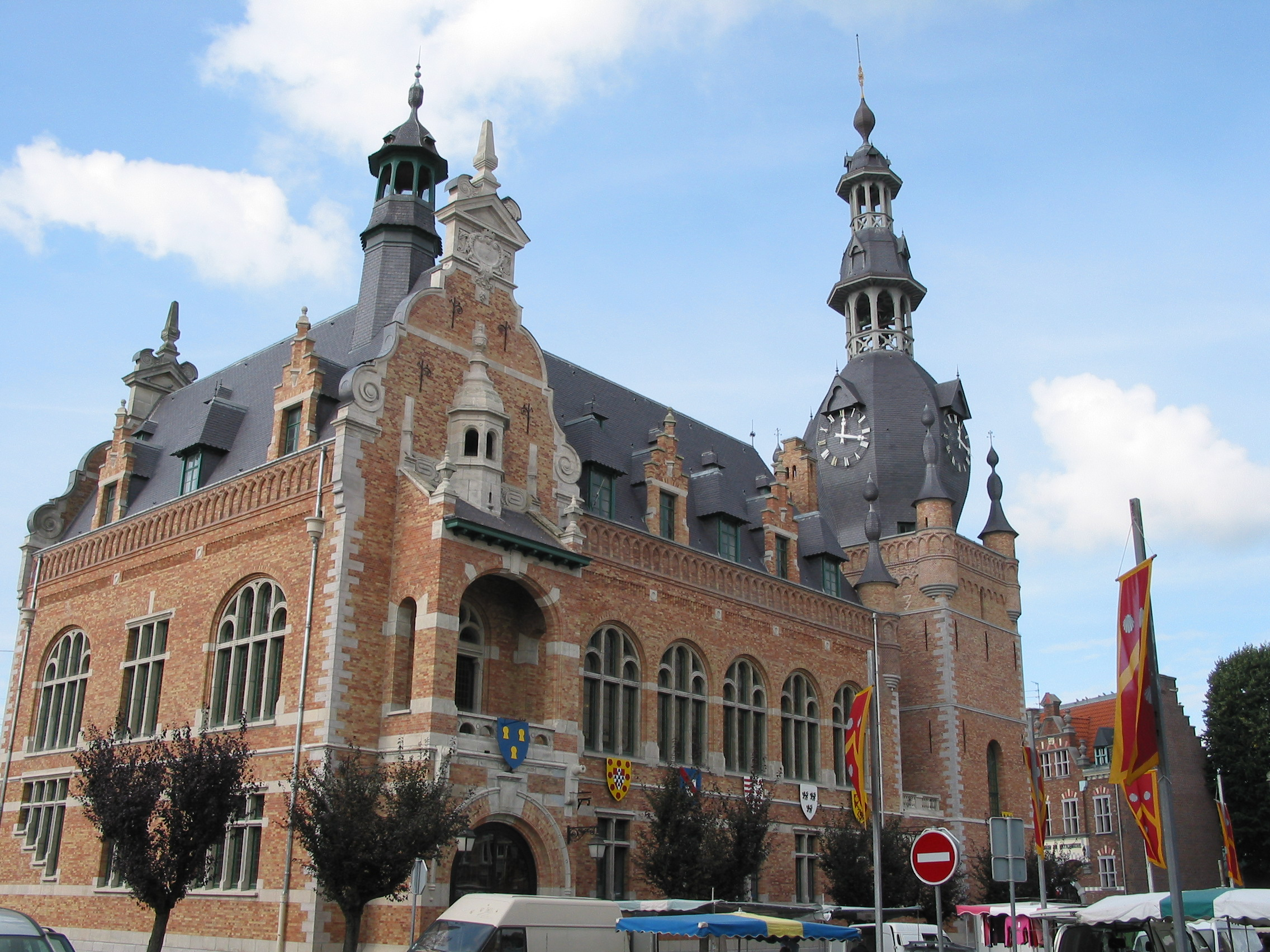
- The main frontage of the Hôtel de Ville in October 2005

General information
- Type: City hall
- Architectural style: Flemish Renaissance style
- Location: Comines, France
- Coordinates: 50.7651°N 3.0062°E
- Completed: 1932

Height
- Height: 52 metres (171 ft)

Design and construction
- Architects: Louis Marie Cordonnier

UNESCO World Heritage Site
- Part of: Belfries of Belgium and France
- Criteria: Cultural: ii, iv
- Reference: 943
- Inscription: 1999 (23rd Session)

Monument historique
- Official name: Hôtel de ville
- Type: Inscrit
- Designated: 2001
- Reference no.: PA59000068

The Hôtel de Ville (French pronunciation: [otɛl də vil], City Hall) is a municipal building in Comines, Nord, in northern France, standing on the Grand Place. It was designated a monument historique by the French government in 2001.

== History ==
The first municipal building in the town, in the form of a tower or belfry, dated back at least to the early 13th century. It was made of wood and burnt down in a fire which destroyed much of the town in 1296. It was subsequently rebuilt in stone but was again destroyed by protestant forces in 1579 during the French Wars of Religion. A new tower was commissioned by the Stadtholder of Flanders, Philippe III de Croÿ, in 1594. It was designed in the Flemish Renaissance style, built in red brick and was completed in 1623. It was augmented by a two-storey town hall, in which markets could be held, during the 17th century.

The design involved an asymmetrical main frontage of seven bays facing onto the Grand Place. The left-hand section of six bays formed the town hall, while the right-hand bay contained a four-stage tower. The left-hand bay featured a large round headed opening on the ground floor and a loggia on the first floor, with a stepped gable and a pediment above. The next five bays were fenestrated by cross-windows on the ground floor, by mullioned and transomed windows on the first floor, and by dormer windows at attic level. The tower contained a small doorway in the first stage and a round headed window in the second stage. The third stage was blind, while the fourth stage contained a lancet window and featured bartizans at the corners. The whole tower, which was 52 metres (171 ft) high, was surmounted by a bulbous dome and a lantern.

The town hall and tower were blown up by German troops using dynamite shortly before they departed in October 1918 towards the end of the First World War. The complex was rebuilt with a concrete frame to a design by Louis Marie Cordonnier in a very similar style after the war. The new town hall and the tower were officially opened by the mayor, Pierre Meurillon, in 1929 and 1932 respectively.

In 2005, the belfry was added to the UNESCO World Heritage List as part of the Belfries of Belgium and France site because of its architecture and historical importance in maintaining municipal power in Europe.
