= Hôtel de Ville, Douai =

Town hall in Douai, France

Hôtel de Ville
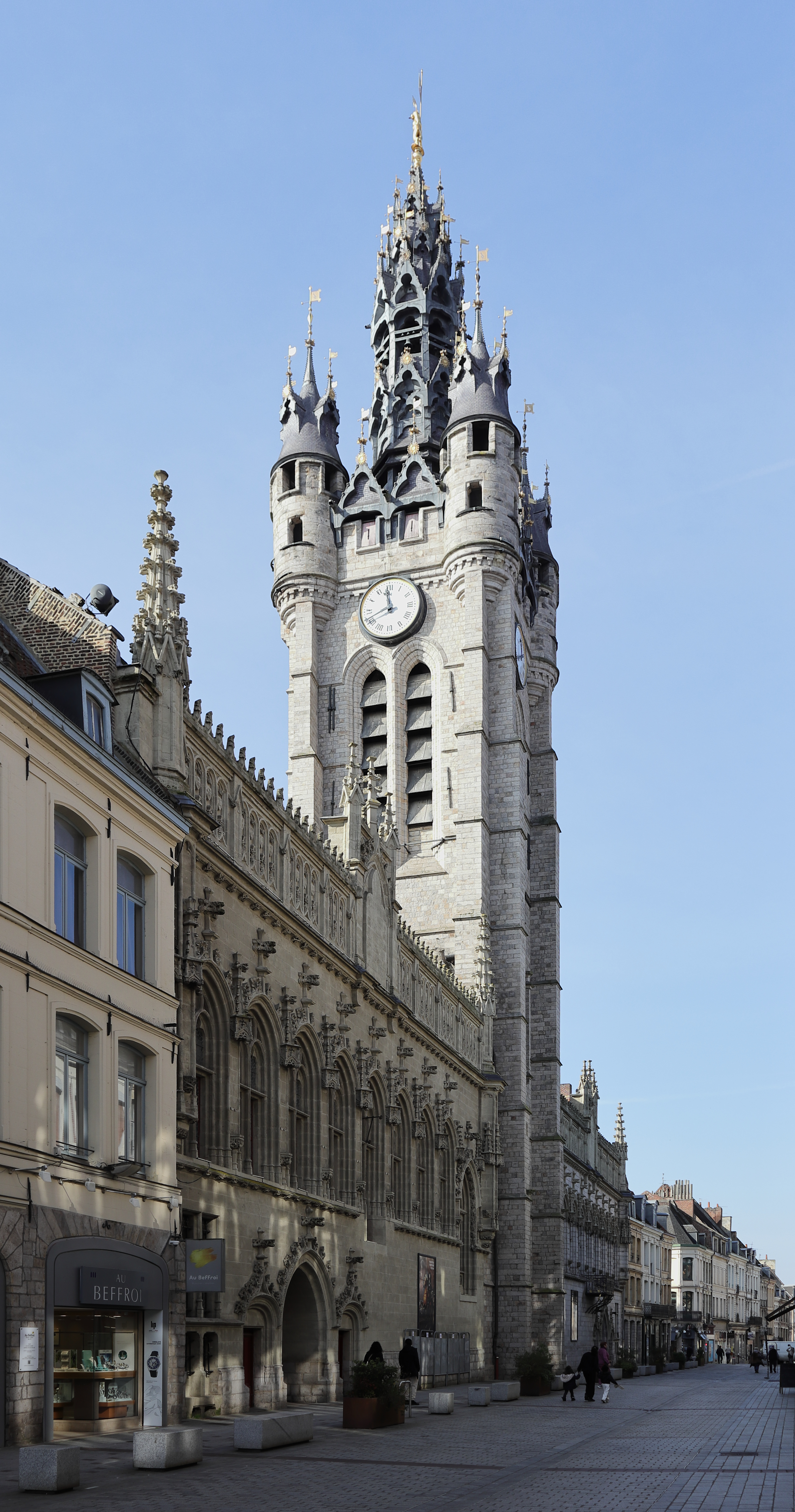
- The belfry and wings of the Hôtel de Ville

General information
- Type: City hall
- Architectural style: Gothic style
- Location: Douai, France
- Coordinates: 50.3678°N 3.0806°E
- Completed: 1410

Height
- Height: 46 metres (151 ft)

Design and construction
- Architects

UNESCO World Heritage Site
- Part of: Belfries of Belgium and France
- Criteria: Cultural: ii, iv
- Reference: 943
- Inscription: 1999 (23rd Session)

Monument historique
- Official name: Hôtel de ville et beffroi
- Type: Inscrit
- Designated: 1862
- Reference no.: PA00107461

The Hôtel de Ville (French pronunciation: [otɛl də vil], City Hall) is a historic building in Douai, Nord, northern France, standing on the Rue de la Marie. It was designated a monument historique by the French government in 1862.

== History ==
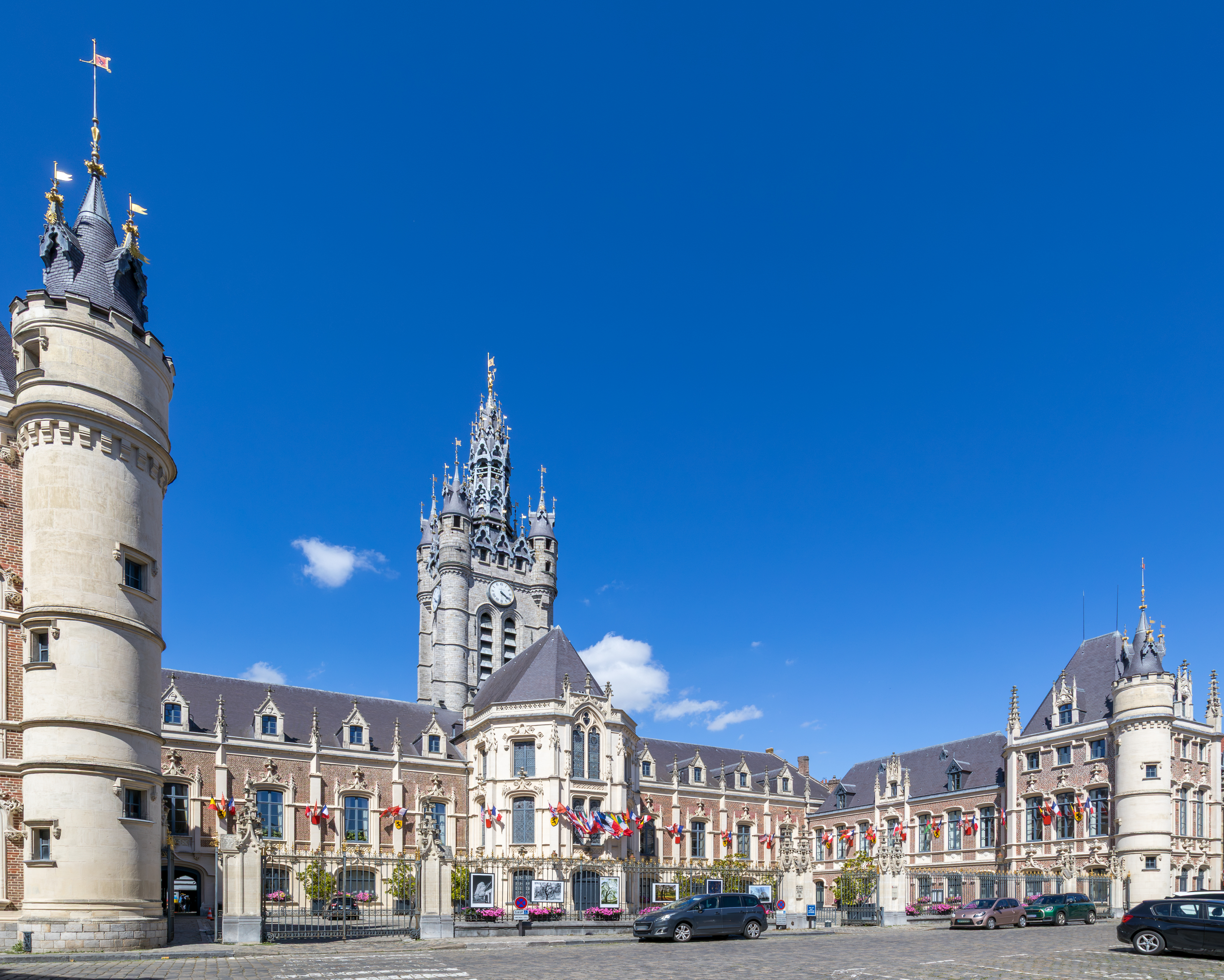
The courtyard of the Hôtel de Ville

Ferdinand, Count of Flanders gave the aldermen of Douai a charter in September 1228, but it was not until at least a century later that an ancient town hall was actually erected. The oldest part of the current complex is the belfry, construction of which began in 1380. It was designed in the Gothic style and built in ashlar stone. When John the Fearless visited Douai in 1404, construction was well advanced but the turrets had not yet been added. They were subsequently constructed, using stone from Bugnicourt, allowing the belfry to be completed in 1410.

In the early 1460s, the aldermen demolished the ancient town hall and erected a new one. However, a major fire, in 1471, engulfed the new town hall and melted the bells in the belfry. In 1475, the belfry was repaired and the present spire was completed. New bells were cast and supplied by Messrs. Willem, Hoarken and Gobelin More. It was at this time that battlements, dormer windows, weather vanes and a spire with an octagonal base, were added to the belfry which, with all these embellishments, rose to 46 metres (151 ft).

In 1473, Charles the Bold authorised the raising of finance for a new town hall. It took the form of a new wing to the west of the belfry: it was blind on the ground floor but fenestrated with nine mullioned windows with tracery on the first floor. A clock, designed and manufactured by Jean Chevalier and his nephew, Nicolas Chevalier, was installed in the belfry in 1663, and new bells were cast and supplied by Nicolas Levache in 1730.

In October 1792, during the French Revolution, revolutionaries tore down the statues of the 11 Counts of Flanders, ending in Philip II of Spain, that had been installed in niches on the wall of the town hall a quarter of a century previously.

In the 19th century, further improvements were made to the town hall including a new wing to the east of the belfry, providing symmetry with the wing to the west, and new wings to the south, i.e. behind the main frontage, to complete the courtyard. Internally, the principal rooms were the la Salle des Gardes (the guardroom) which served as the council chamber and la Salle Blanc (the white room) which served as a room for ceremonies. In 1837, the French Romantic writer and politician, Victor Hugo, wrote during a tour of the region: "Il y a là le plus joli beffroi que j'aie encore vu." ("It is the prettiest belfry that I have ever seen.")

In September 1914, at the start of the First World War, German troops attacked the town and started shooting at allied troops in the town hall. The allied troops re-grouped in the courtyard and mounted a short-lived counterattack, before the Germans eventually occupied the town. Following the liberation of the town on 1 September 1944, during the Second World War, a municipal delegation led by Paul Phalempin was installed at the town hall on 30 October 1944. General Charles de Gaulle, visited the town and gave a speech from the balcony of the town hall on 13 February 1949.

In 2005, the belfry was added to the UNESCO World Heritage List as part of the Belfries of Belgium and France site.

== Sources ==
- Pilate-Prévost, H. (1838). Notice historique sur l'hôtel-de-ville et le beffroi de Douai. Imprimerie de V. Adam.
