= Armentières =

Armentières Armentiers
- Commune
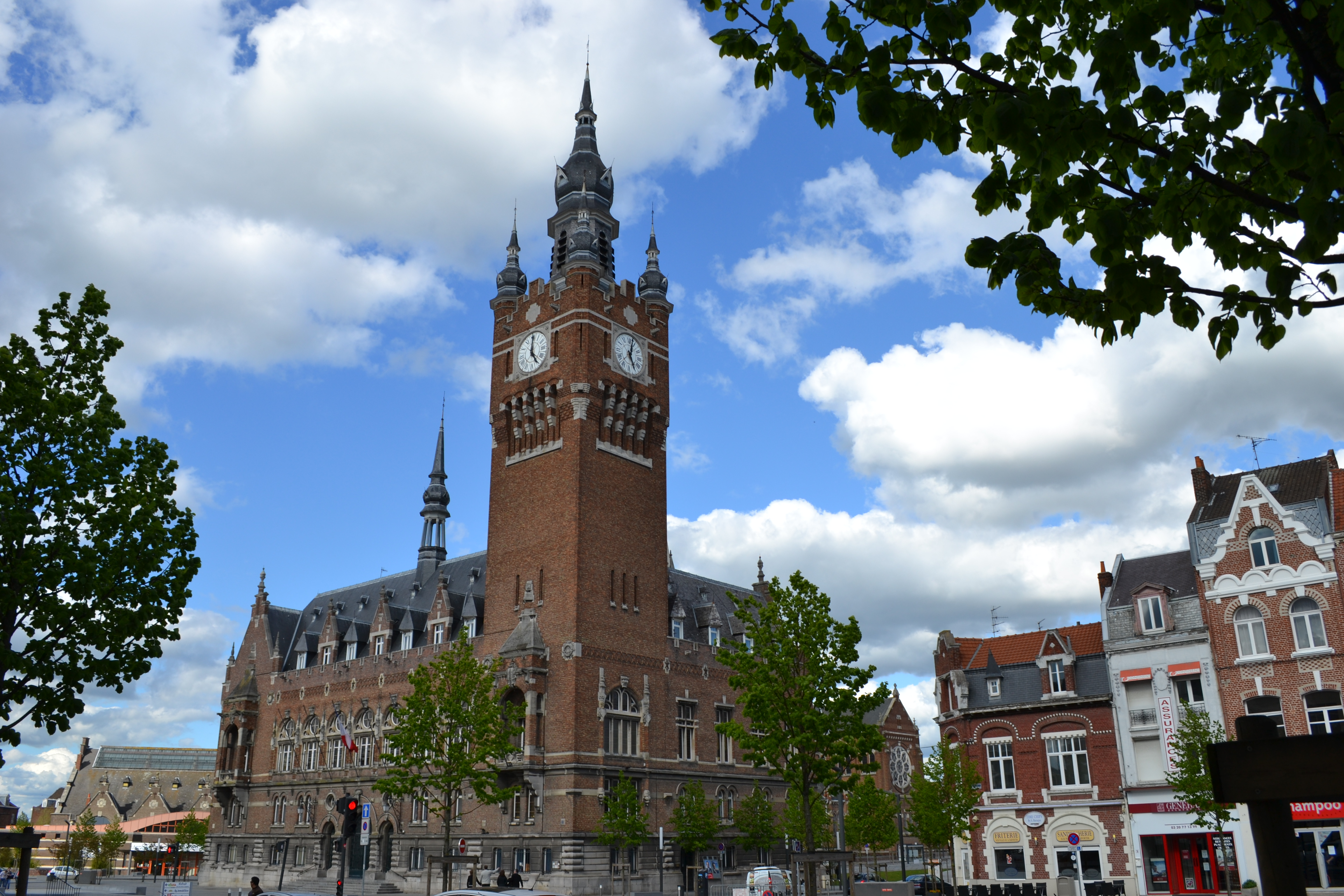
- The Hôtel de Ville

- Coat of arms
- Location of Armentières
- Location within France Location within Hauts-de-France
- Coordinates: 50°41′17″N 2°52′52″E
- Country: France
- Region: Hauts-de-France
- Department: Nord
- Arrondissement: Lille
- Canton: Armentières
- Intercommunality: Métropole Européenne de Lille

Government
  - Mayor (2024–2026): Jean-Michel Monpays
- Area^{1}: 6.28 km^{2} (2.42 sq mi)
- Elevation: 17 m (56 ft)
- Population (2023): 26,998
  - Density: 4,300/km^{2} (11,100/sq mi)
- Time zone: UTC+01:00 (CET)
  - Summer (DST): UTC+02:00 (CEST)
- INSEE/Postal code: 59017 /59280
- ^{1} French Land Register data, which excludes lakes, ponds, glaciers > 1 km^{2} (0.386 sq mi or 247 acres) and river estuaries.

Armentières (French pronunciation: [aʁmɑ̃tjɛʁ]; West Flemish: Armentiers, Picard: Armintîre) is a commune in the Nord department in the Hauts-de-France region in northern France. It is part of the Métropole Européenne de Lille.

The motto of the town is Pauvre mais fière (Poor but proud).

== Geography ==
Armentières lies on the Belgian border, northwest of the city of Lille, on the right bank of the river Lys.

== History ==
In 1668, the town became French, along with most of the rest of French Flanders.At the end of the 19th century and the beginning of the 20th, Armentières acquired fame, being the "City of Fabric". Industrial weaving, spinning and brewing grew in Armentières, benefitting from the presence of water.

Armentières particularly suffered during the World Wars although the town received two Military Crosses, one for World War I and the second for the Second World War and the Legion d'Honneur. In Armentières and the surrounding areas, the military cemeteries are places of remembrance for the casualties of the world wars. "Mademoiselle from Armentières" was a popular song among Allied soldiers in World War I.

During World War I, in October 1914, the town was the site of the Battle of Armentières. Later in the war, Armentières was repeatedly shelled by the Germans with mustard gas. In July 1917, 675 civilians were wounded of which 86 died due to lingering residue, as the agent was a new and unknown weapon. In April 1918, German troops shelled the town again. British troops were forced to evacuate the area, but the Germans could not enter for two weeks because of the heavy contamination. Witnesses to the bombardment stated that the shelling was so heavy that liquid mustard gas ran in the streets. The town was rebuilt after the war and the new Hôtel de Ville was officially opened in 1934.

== Population ==
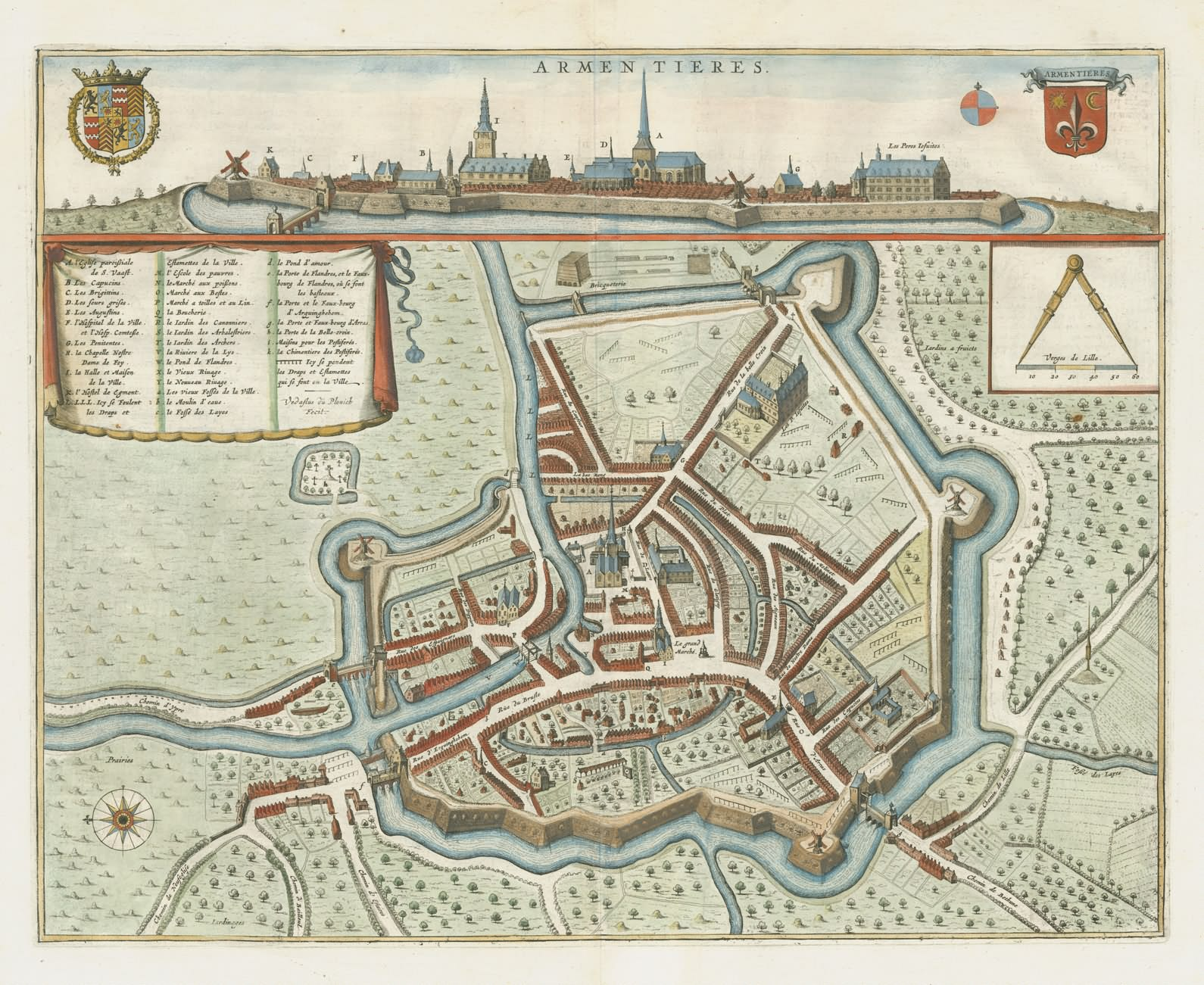
Armentières in 1649

Population of Armentières since 1793

Year	Pop.	±% p.a.
1793	7,671	—
1800	7,598	−0.14%
1806	7,542	−0.12%
1821	7,681	+0.12%
1831	6,338	−1.90%
1836	6,512	+0.54%
1841	6,817	+0.92%
1846	7,959	+3.15%
1851	8,840	+2.12%
1856	10,104	+2.71%
1861	11,901	+3.33%
1866	15,579	+5.53%
1872	19,035	+3.40%
1876	21,746	+3.38%
1881	25,089	+2.90%
1886	27,985	+2.21%
1891	28,638	+0.46%
1896	29,603	+0.67%
1901	29,401	−0.14%

Year	Pop.	±% p.a.
1906	28,613	−0.54%
1911	28,625	+0.01%
1921	14,758	−6.41%
1926	21,035	+7.35%
1931	22,704	+1.54%
1936	24,049	+1.16%
1946	22,667	−0.59%
1954	24,940	+1.20%
1962	25,248	+0.15%
1968	26,916	+1.07%
1975	26,346	−0.31%
1982	24,834	−0.84%
1990	25,219	+0.19%
1999	25,273	+0.02%
2007	25,170	−0.05%
2012	25,993	+0.65%
2017	24,882	−0.87%
2023	26,998	+1.37%

Source: EHESS and INSEE (1968-2023)

=== Heraldry ===
Arms of Armentières	The arms of Armentières are blazoned : Argent a fleur de lys gules and on a chief of the same a sun or and a decrescent of the same.

== Railways ==
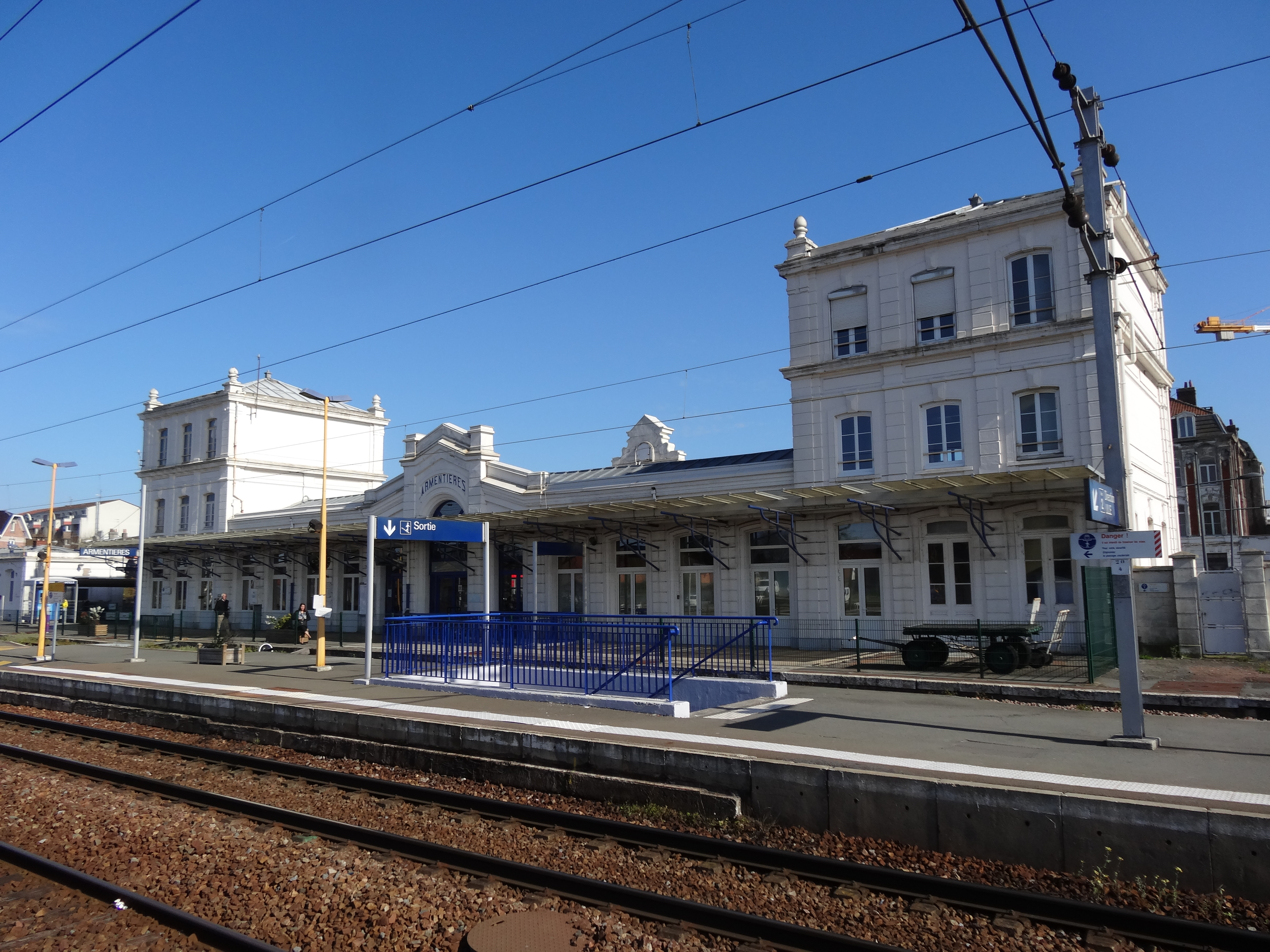
Armentières station, 2013

Armentières has a railway station on the line from Lille to Calais and Dunkirk.

It was commissioned in 1848 by the Chemins de Fer du Nord (Northern Railway Company). The buildings were completed in 1861.

The station is currently served by TER Hauts-de-France trains, on the routes between Lille-Flandres station and Dunkirk, and between Lille-Flandres and Hazebrouck.

== Twin towns – sister cities ==
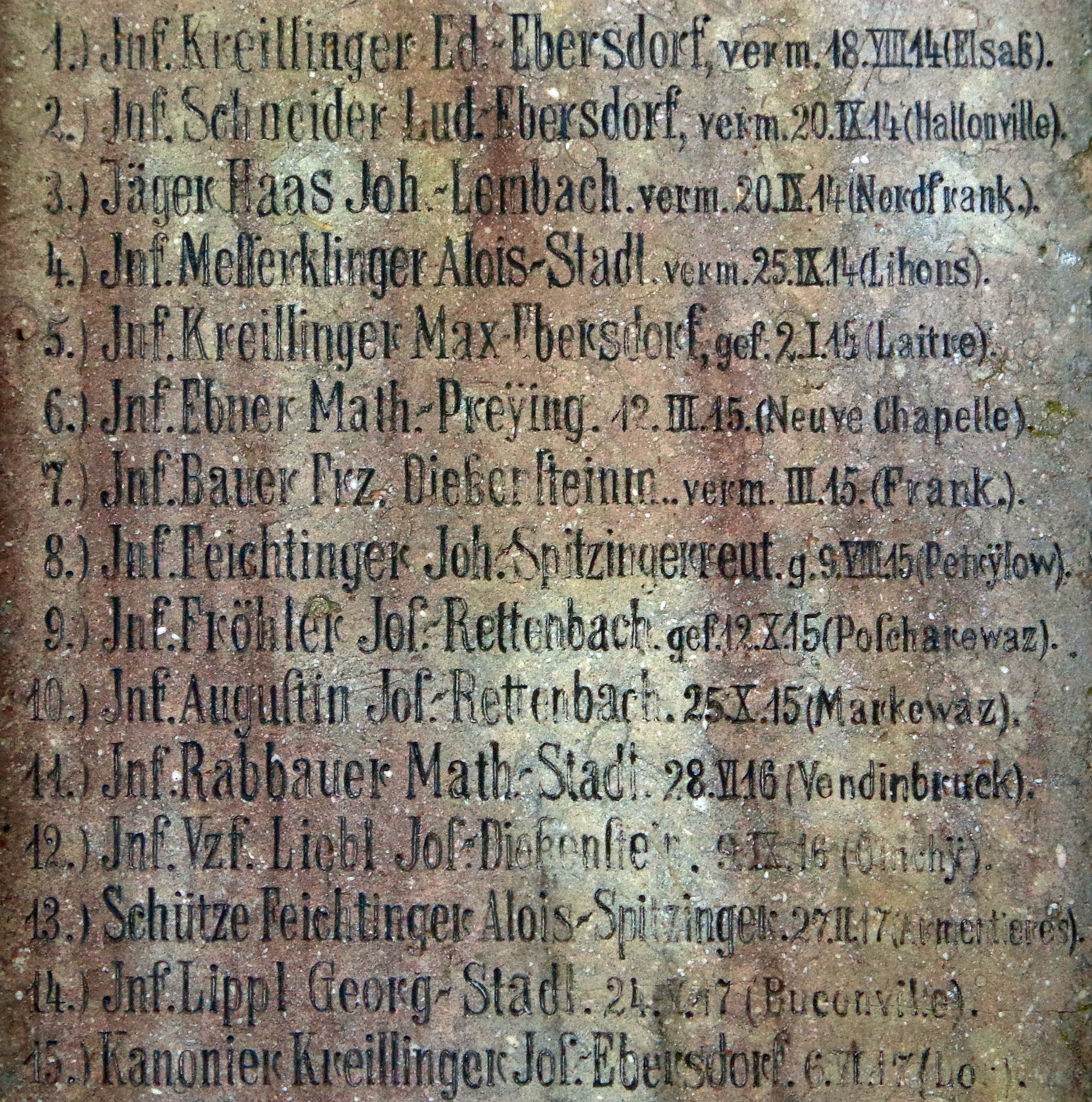
Detail of the war memorial in Preying, Bavaria naming Schütze Alois Feichtinger as killed at Armentières, 27 February 1917

Armentières is twinned with:

- Litoměřice, Czech Republic
- Osterode am Harz, Germany
- Stalybridge, England, United Kingdom

== Notable people ==
- Amédée Fournier (1912–1992), cyclist, Olympic medalist
- Jean Maurice Fiey (1914–1995), Church historian and Syriacist
- Dany Boon (born 1966), actor and stand-up comedian
- Martin Terrier (born 1997), footballer

== Monuments ==
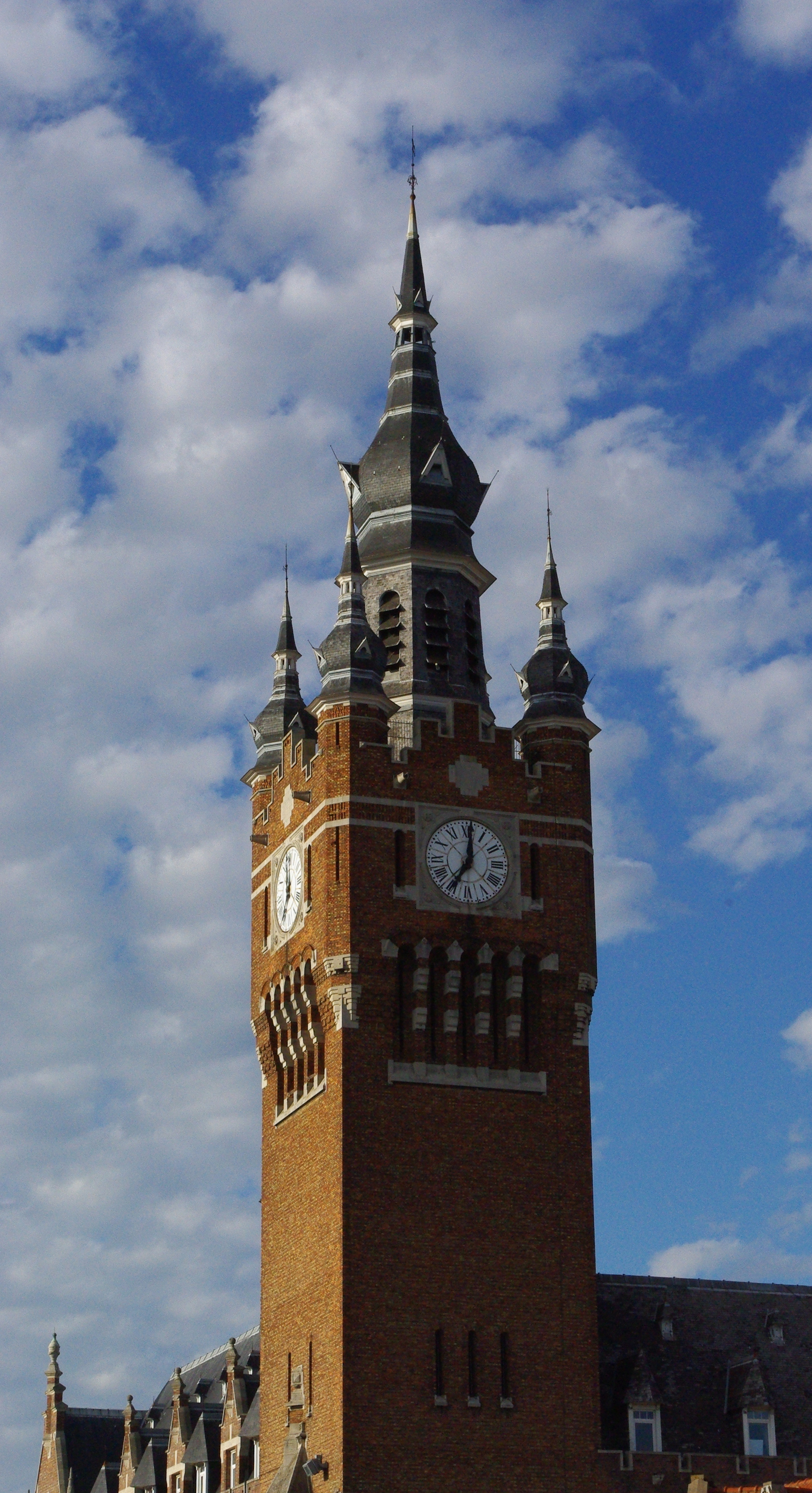
The Belfry of Armentières

The belfry of Armentières was inscribed on the UNESCO World Heritage List in 2005 as part of the Belfries of Belgium and France site, and in recognition of their influence in the rise of municipal power in Europe. The belfry, just like the nearing city hall was designed by the architect Louis Marie Cordonnier and is open for visitors and tourists.

== In fiction ==
Milady de Winter in The Three Musketeers hides in Armentières. She is caught and executed there.

The bawdy song, Mademoiselle from Armentières, was popular amongst British and American troops during World War 1. There are multiple version of the lyrics, that mostly refer to a woman from the town.

== See also ==
- Communes of the Nord department
