= Douai =

City in Hauts-de-France, France

Douai Doï (Picard)
- Subprefecture and commune
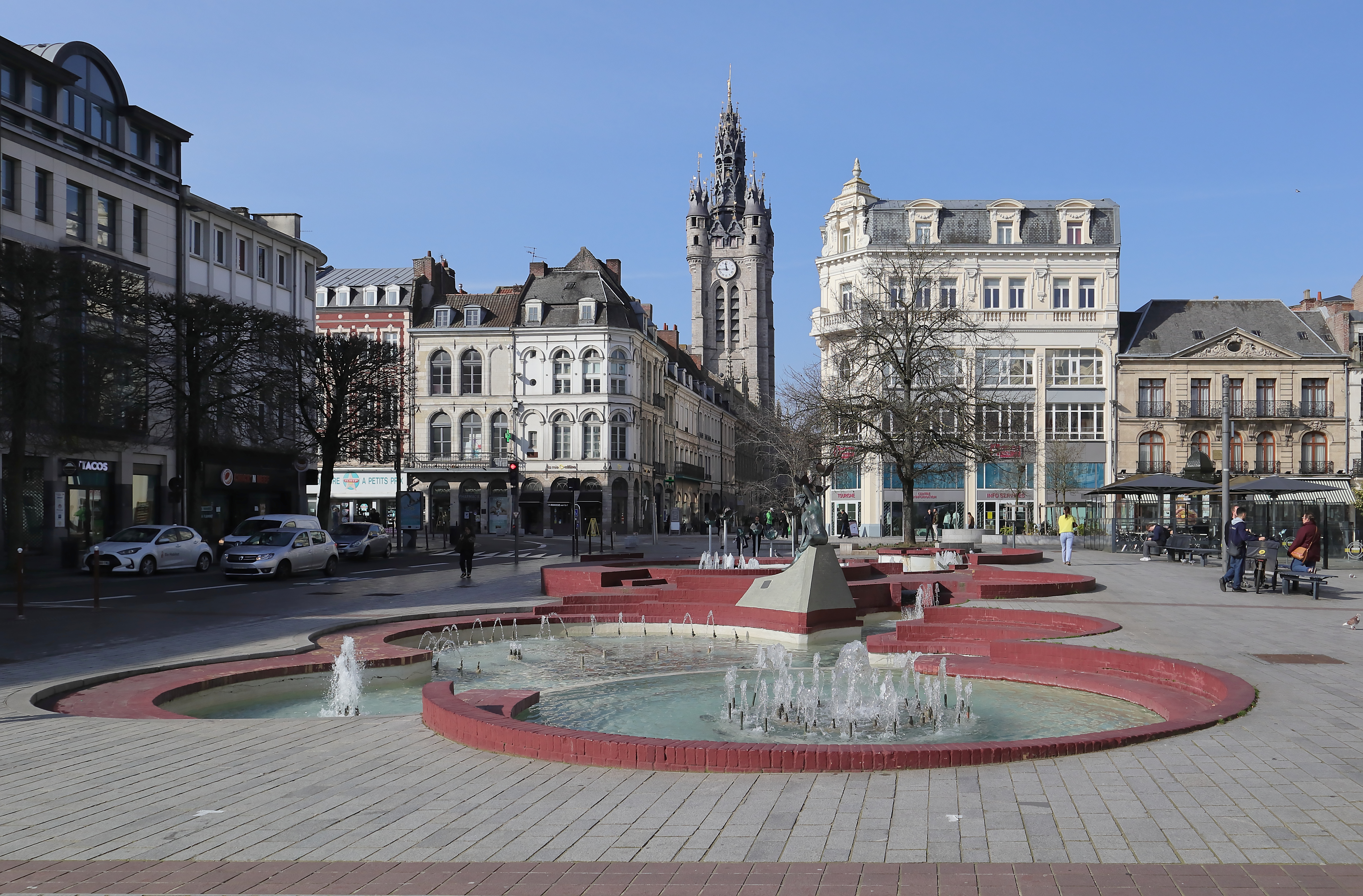
- The parade ground and the belfry

- Coat of arms
- Location of Douai
- Location within France Location within Hauts-de-France
- Coordinates: 50°22′17″N 3°04′48″E
- Country: France
- Region: Hauts-de-France
- Department: Nord
- Arrondissement: Douai
- Canton: Douai
- Intercommunality: Douaisis Agglo

Government
  - Mayor (2020–2026): Frédéric Chéreau
- Area^{1}: 16.88 km^{2} (6.52 sq mi)
- Elevation: 24 m (79 ft)
- Highest elevation: 38 m (125 ft)
- Lowest elevation: 16 m (52 ft)
- Population (2023): 40,250
  - Density: 2,384/km^{2} (6,176/sq mi)
- Time zone: UTC+01:00 (CET)
  - Summer (DST): UTC+02:00 (CEST)
- INSEE/Postal code: 59178 /59500
- ^{1} French Land Register data, which excludes lakes, ponds, glaciers > 1 km^{2} (0.386 sq mi or 247 acres) and river estuaries.

Douai (UK: /ˈduːeɪ/ DOO-ay, US: /duˈeɪ/ doo-AY, French: [dwɛ]; Picard: Doï; Dutch: Dowaai; formerly spelled Douay or Doway in English) is a city in the Nord département in northern France. It is a sub-prefecture of the department. Located on the river Scarpe some 40 kilometres (25 miles) from Lille and 25 km (16 mi) from Arras, Douai is home to one of the region's most impressive belfries.

== History ==
Its site probably corresponds to that of a 4th-century Roman fortress known as Duacum. From the 10th century, the town was a romance fiefdom of the counts of Flanders. The town became a flourishing textile market centre during the Middle Ages, historically known as Douay or Doway in English. In 1384, the county of Flanders passed into the domains of the Dukes of Burgundy and thence in 1477 into Habsburg possessions.

In 1667, Douai was taken by the troops of Louis XIV, and by the 1668 Treaty of Aix-la-Chapelle, the town was ceded to France. During successive sieges from 1710 to 1712, Douai was almost completely destroyed by the British Army. By 1713, the town was fully integrated into France. Douai became the seat of the Parliament of Flanders (fr).

The local airfield at La Brayelle was very significant in the history of French aviation. It operated from 1907 to the mid-1950s. In 1909 it was the site of the world's first aeronautical meeting.

Douai was again caught up in hostilities in World War I. when for much of the war it was occupied by the Germans. La Brayelle airfield was a base of Manfred von Richthofen, the Red Baron. Later in 1918, the town was partly burned, and was liberated by the British Army after the Battle of Courtrai.

The Douaihy family of Lebanon claims descent from inhabitants of the city who settled in Lebanon during the Crusades.

== Geography ==
=== Climate ===
Douai has an oceanic climate (Köppen climate classification Cfb). The average annual temperature in Douai is 11.0 °C (51.8 °F). The average annual rainfall is 729.2 mm (28.71 in) with December as the wettest month. The temperatures are highest on average in July, at around 18.6 °C (65.5 °F), and lowest in January, at around 4.0 °C (39.2 °F). The highest temperature ever recorded in Douai was 40.8 °C (105.4 °F) on 25 July 2019; the coldest temperature ever recorded was −20.5 °C (−4.9 °F) on 8 January 1985.

Climate data for Douai (1991−2020 normals, extremes 1962−present)
Month	Jan	Feb	Mar	Apr	May	Jun	Jul	Aug	Sep	Oct	Nov	Dec	Year
Record high °C (°F)	15.0 (59.0)	19.5 (67.1)	24.8 (76.6)	28.0 (82.4)	32.4 (90.3)	37.4 (99.3)	40.8 (105.4)	38.9 (102.0)	35.5 (95.9)	29.0 (84.2)	20.5 (68.9)	16.2 (61.2)	40.8 (105.4)
Mean daily maximum °C (°F)	6.4 (43.5)	7.4 (45.3)	11.2 (52.2)	15.1 (59.2)	18.5 (65.3)	21.6 (70.9)	23.9 (75.0)	23.9 (75.0)	20.1 (68.2)	15.2 (59.4)	10.1 (50.2)	6.9 (44.4)	15.0 (59.0)
Daily mean °C (°F)	4.0 (39.2)	4.5 (40.1)	7.2 (45.0)	10.1 (50.2)	13.5 (56.3)	16.5 (61.7)	18.6 (65.5)	18.4 (65.1)	15.3 (59.5)	11.5 (52.7)	7.3 (45.1)	4.5 (40.1)	11.0 (51.8)
Mean daily minimum °C (°F)	1.5 (34.7)	1.5 (34.7)	3.3 (37.9)	5.1 (41.2)	8.5 (47.3)	11.4 (52.5)	13.2 (55.8)	13.0 (55.4)	10.4 (50.7)	7.8 (46.0)	4.5 (40.1)	2.1 (35.8)	6.9 (44.4)
Record low °C (°F)	−20.5 (−4.9)	−12.5 (9.5)	−11.0 (12.2)	−4.5 (23.9)	−1.5 (29.3)	1.0 (33.8)	4.1 (39.4)	0.8 (33.4)	0.0 (32.0)	−6.0 (21.2)	−9.5 (14.9)	−12.5 (9.5)	−20.5 (−4.9)
Average precipitation mm (inches)	57.8 (2.28)	51.4 (2.02)	52.5 (2.07)	41.9 (1.65)	56.6 (2.23)	63.3 (2.49)	68.1 (2.68)	68.1 (2.68)	60.9 (2.40)	64.4 (2.54)	71.0 (2.80)	73.2 (2.88)	729.2 (28.71)
Average precipitation days (≥ 1.0 mm)	11.8	10.6	10.5	9.0	9.7	9.1	9.2	9.3	9.1	11.1	13.1	13.3	125.8
Source: Meteociel

== Main sites ==
Douai's ornate Gothic-style belfry was begun in 1380, on the site of an earlier tower. The 80 m high structure includes an impressive carillon, consisting of 62 bells spanning 5 octaves. The originals, some dating from 1391, were removed in 1917 during World War I by the occupying German forces, who intended to melt them down for the metal. They were reinstalled after repairs in 1924, but 47 of them were replaced in 1954 to obtain a better sound. An additional larger bell in the summit, a La called "Joyeuse", dates from 1471 and weighs 5.5 tonnes. The chimes are rung by a mechanism every quarter-hour, but are also played via a keyboard on Saturday mornings and at certain other times. In 2005 the belfry was inscribed on the UNESCO World Heritage List as a part of the Belfries of Belgium and France site, in recognition of its architecture and importance in the history of municipal power in France. The belfry forms part of the Hôtel de Ville (City Hall) complex.

The substantial Porte de Valenciennes town gate, a reminder of the town's past military importance, was built in 1453. One face is built in Gothic style, while the other is of Classical design.

St. Peter's collegiate church in Douai is 112 meters long. An organ originally destined for the Saint Petersburg Conservatory was fitted into the 18th century organ case in 1922.

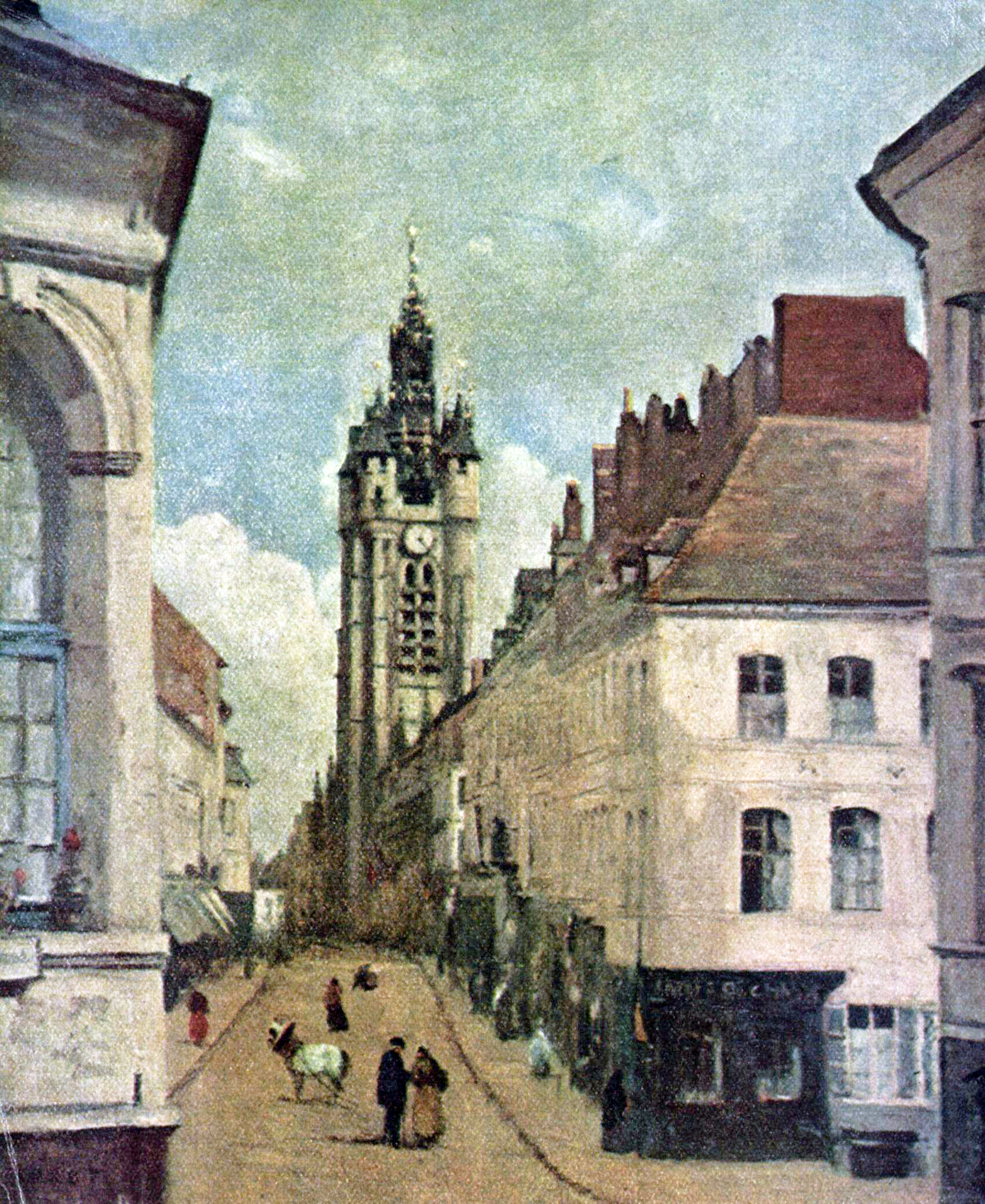
Bell tower of Douai, Jean-Baptiste-Camille Corot

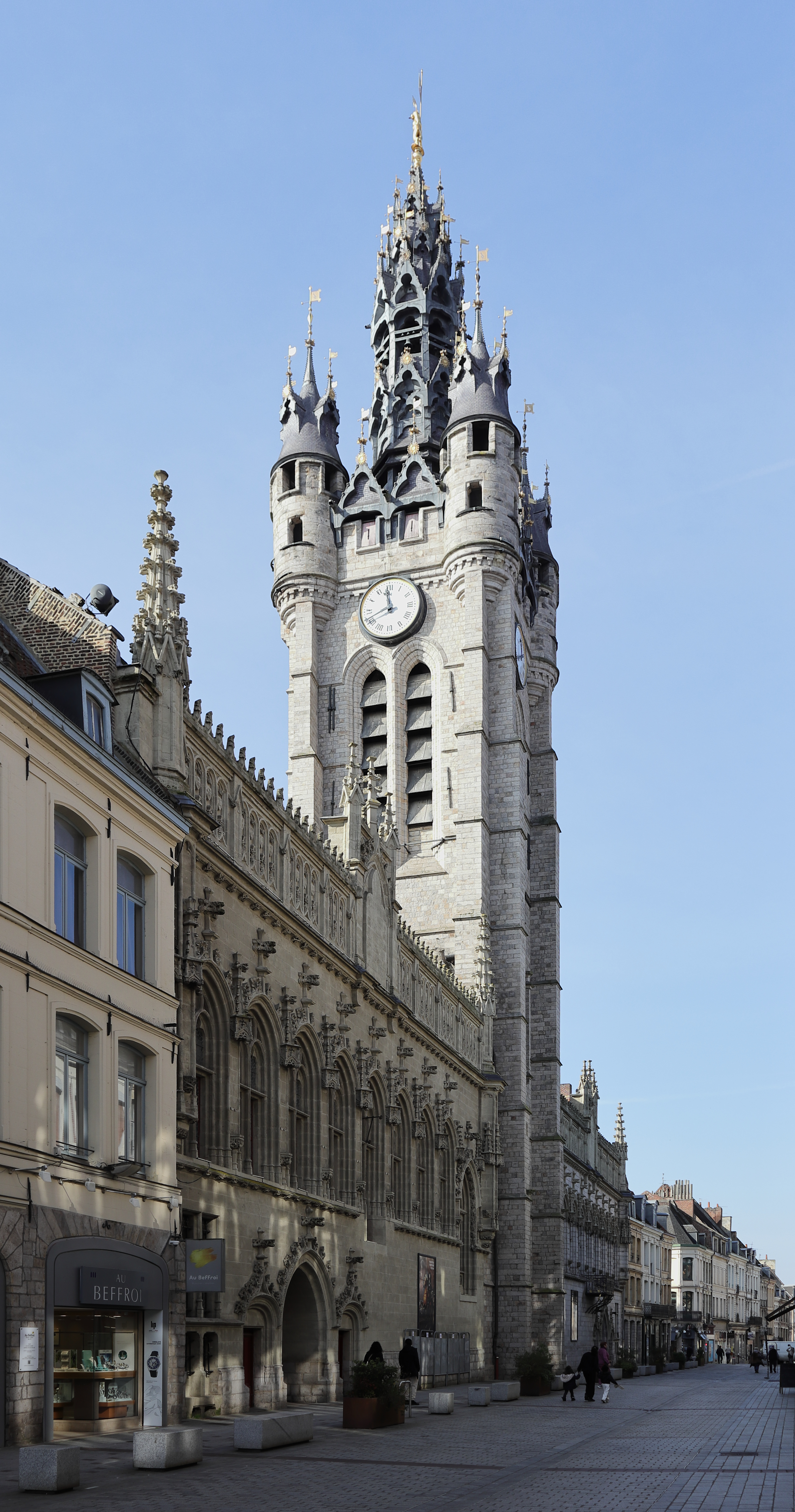
The belfry seen from street level

Detail of Douai's belfry

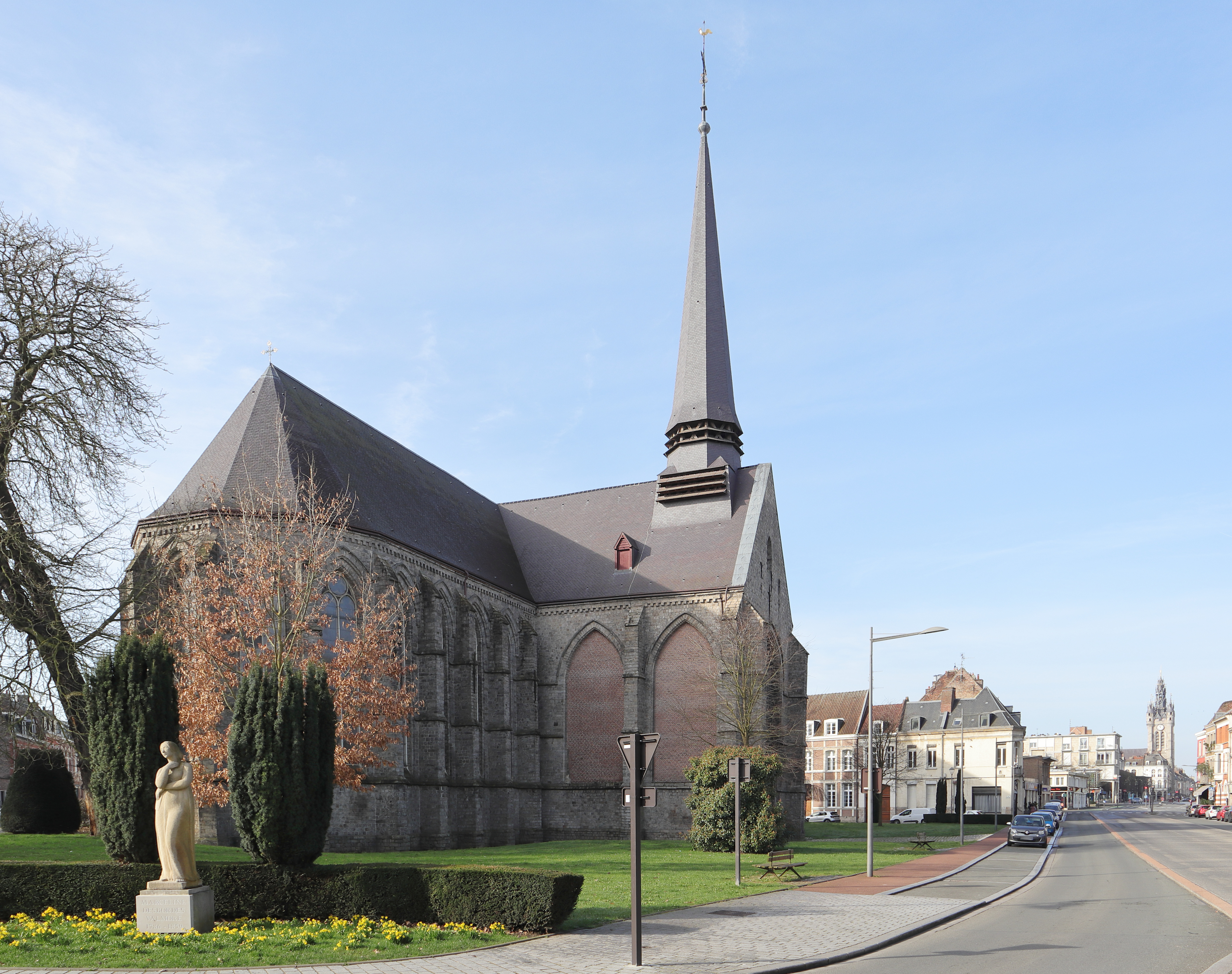
Church of Our Lady of the Annunciation

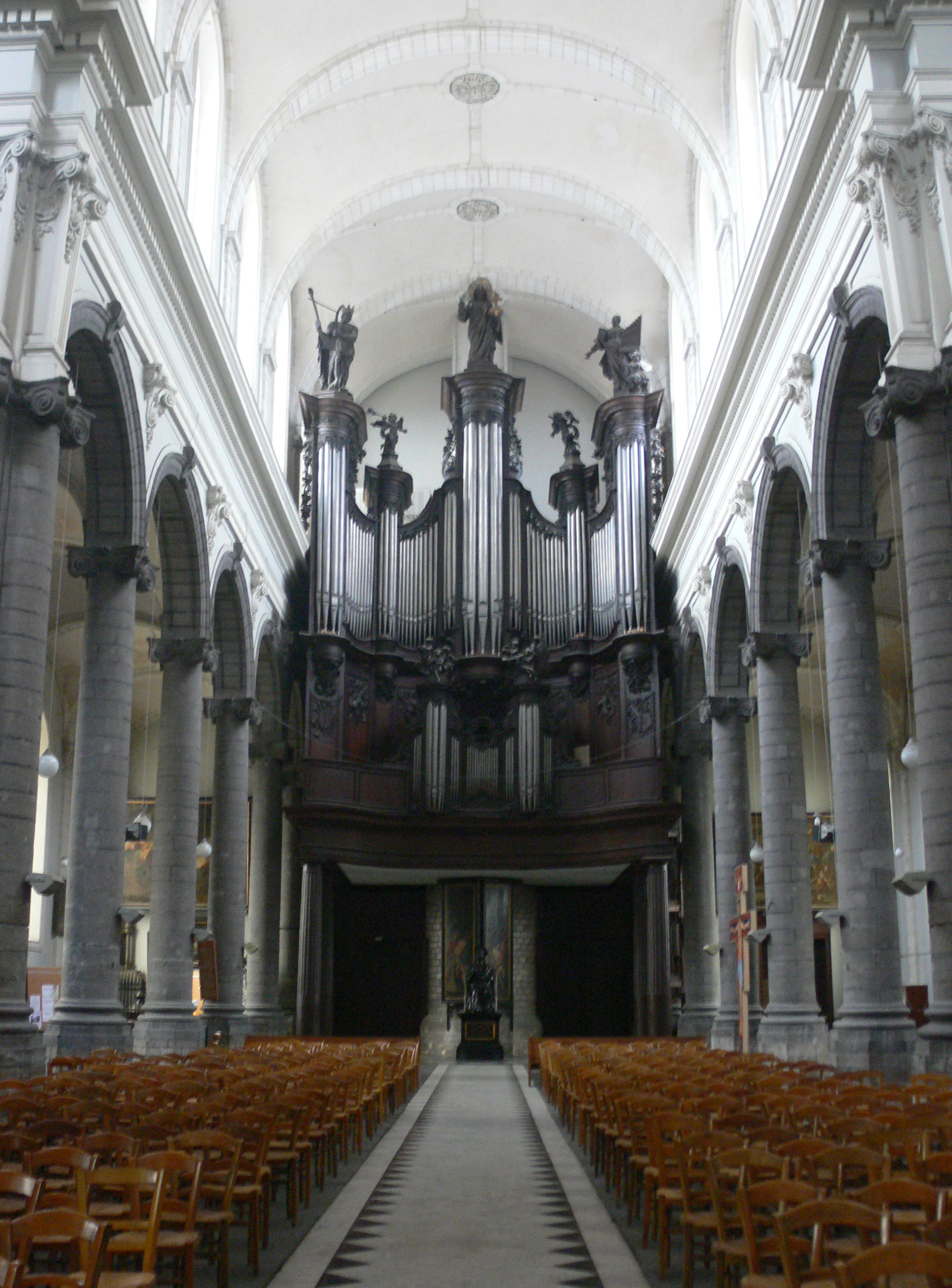
Main organ of St. Peter's collegiate church

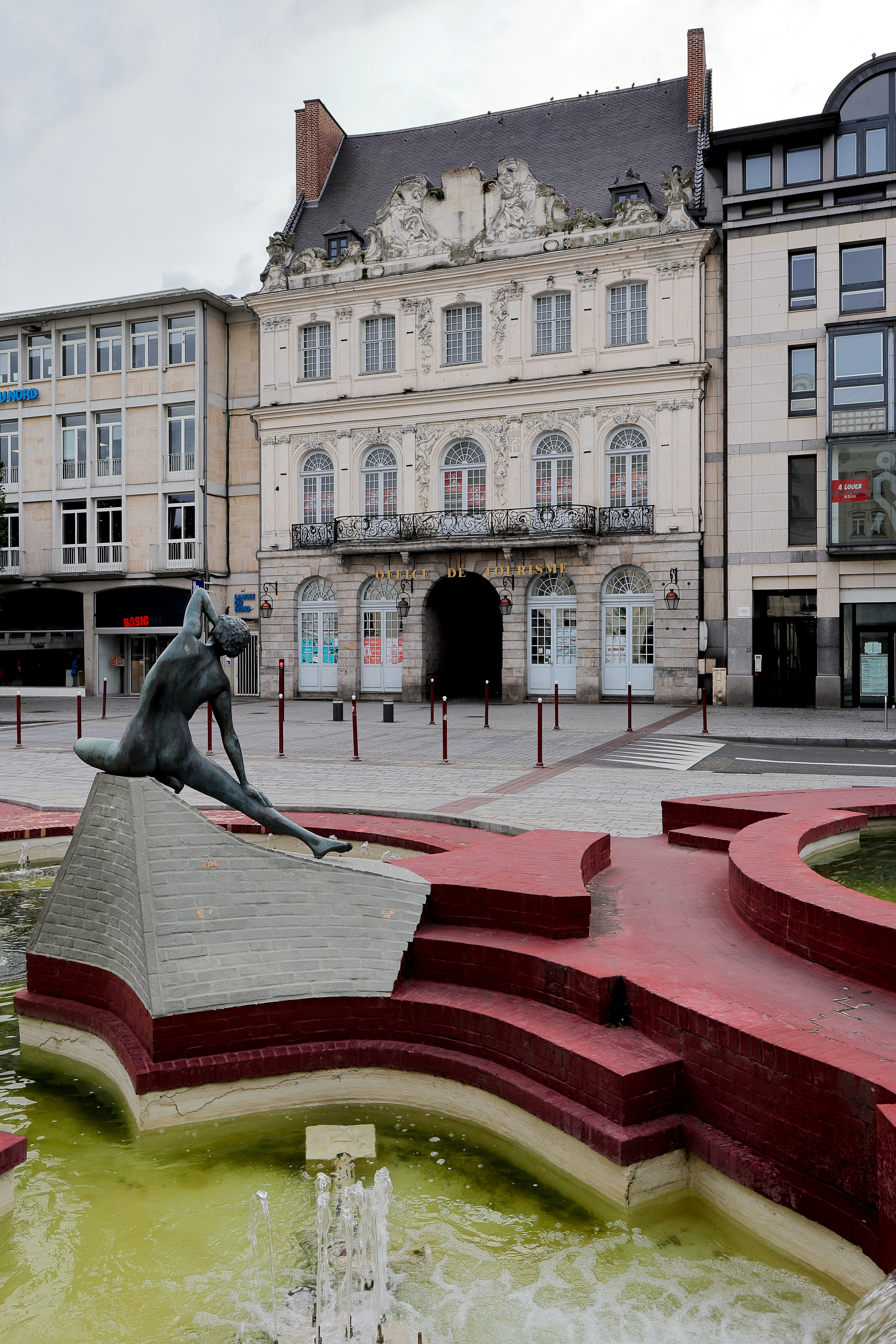
Hôtel du Dauphin

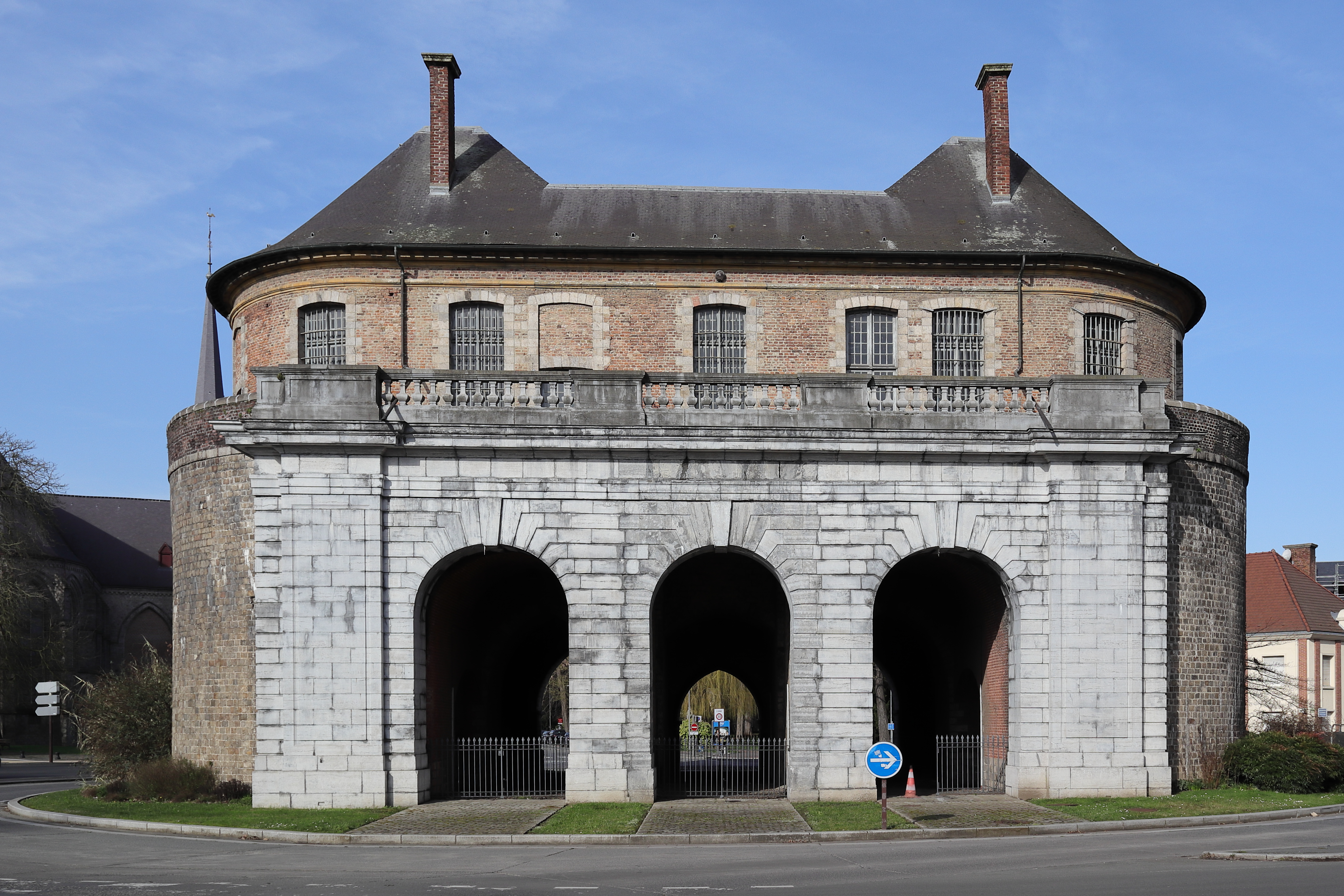
Gate of Valenciennes

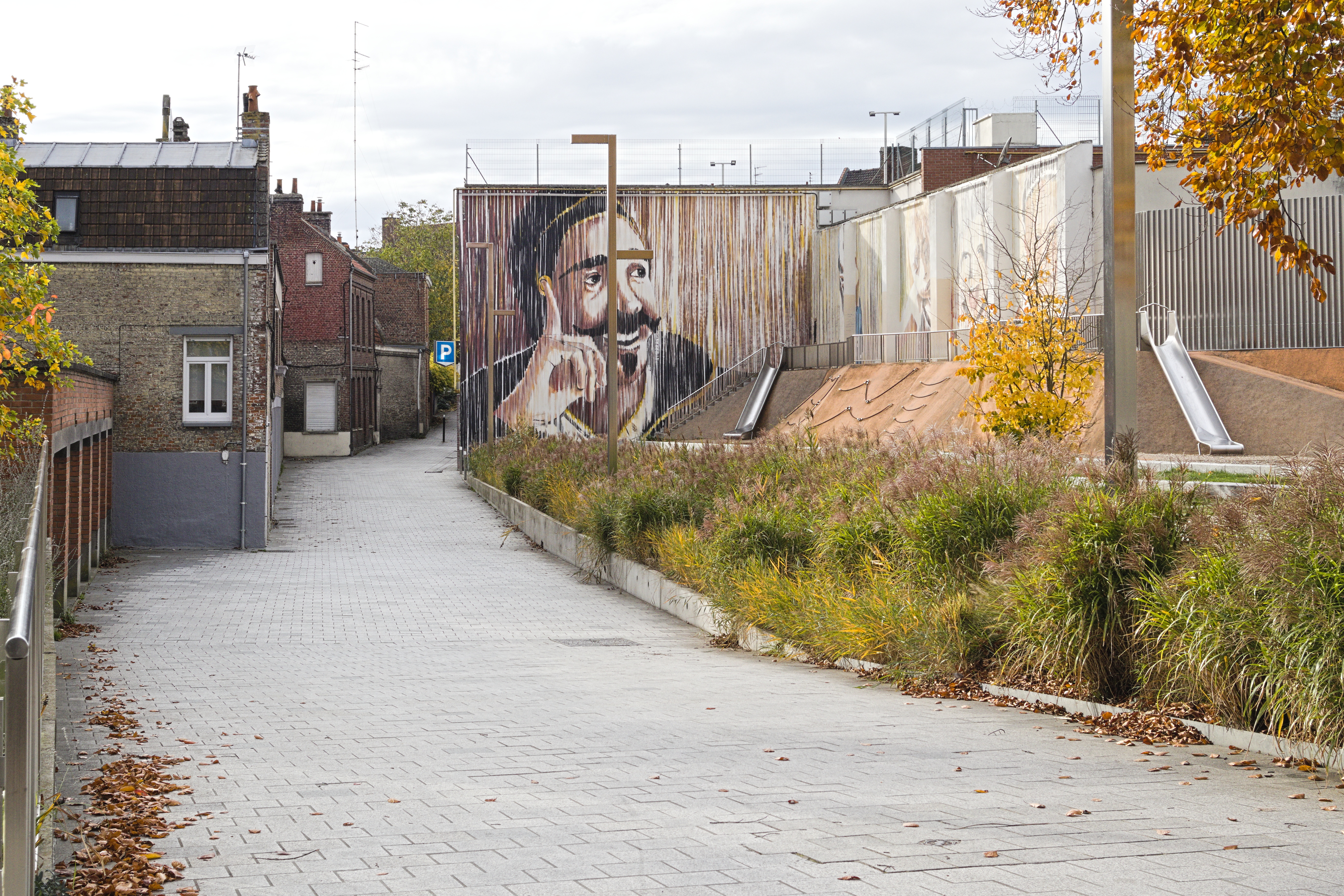
Ruelle des Archers

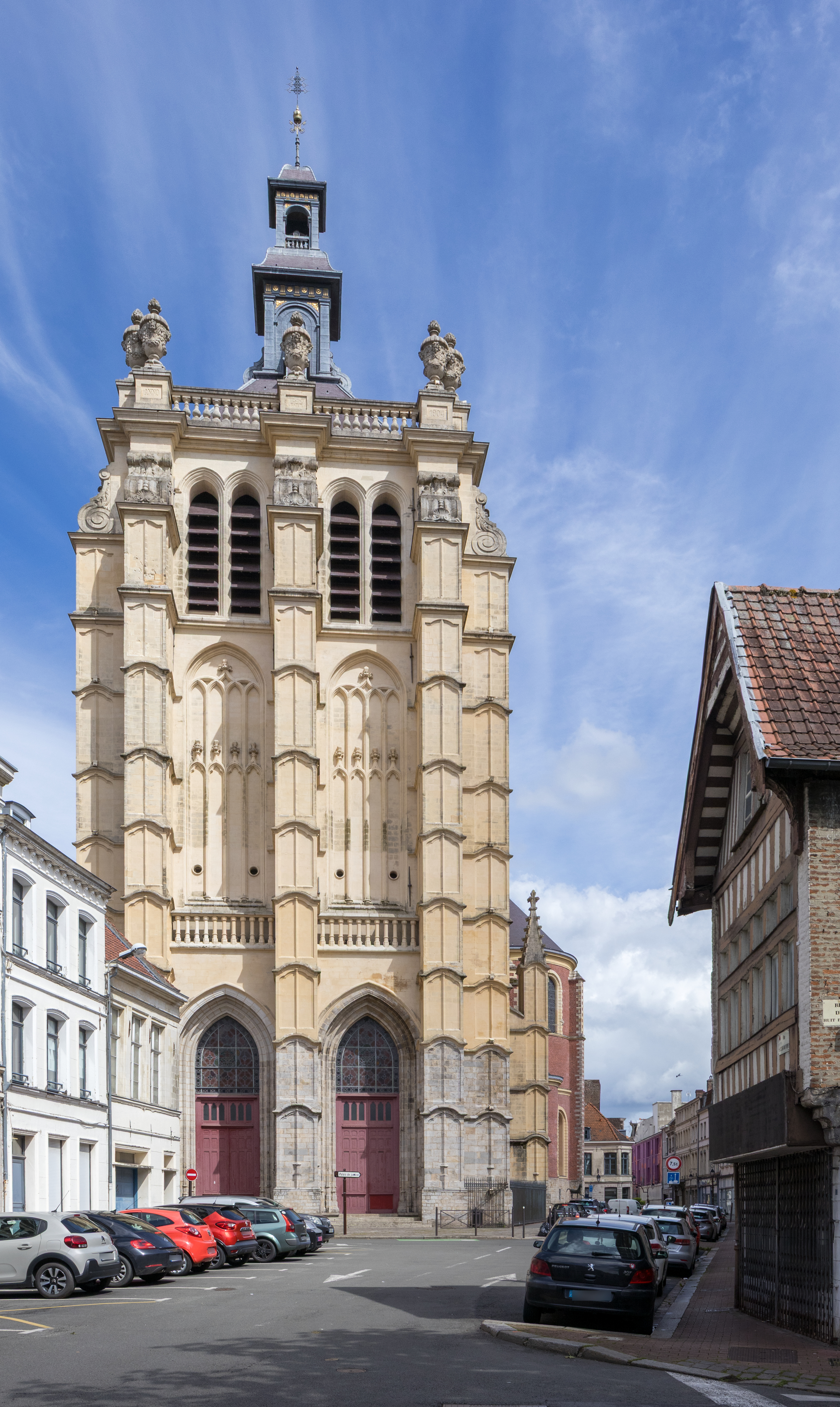
Collegiate Church of Saint-Pierre in Douai

== Economy ==
Douai's main industries are in the chemical and metal engineering sectors.

Since 1970, Renault has a large automobile assembly line nearby, called Usine Georges Besse after assassinated CEO Georges Besse. It produced vehicles such as the R14, R11, R19, Mégane and Scénic. Following industry changes, it now makes electric cars.

The Gare de Douai railway station is served by regional trains to Lille, Arras, Lens, Amiens, Saint-Quentin and Valenciennes. It connects to the TGV network, with high speed trains to Paris, Lyon, Nantes and other places.

== Population ==
Historical population

Year	Pop.	±% p.a.
1793	17,855	—
1800	18,230	+0.30%
1806	18,461	+0.21%
1821	18,854	+0.14%
1831	18,793	−0.03%
1836	19,173	+0.40%
1841	23,203	+3.89%
1846	20,483	−2.46%
1851	20,528	+0.04%
1856	22,819	+2.14%
1861	24,486	+1.42%
1866	24,105	−0.31%
1872	23,841	−0.18%
1876	26,999	+3.16%
1881	29,172	+1.56%
1886	30,030	+0.58%
1891	29,909	−0.08%
1896	31,397	+0.98%
1901	33,649	+1.40%

Year	Pop.	±% p.a.
1906	33,247	−0.24%
1911	36,314	+1.78%
1921	34,131	−0.62%
1926	38,627	+2.51%
1931	41,598	+1.49%
1936	42,021	+0.20%
1946	37,258	−1.20%
1954	43,380	+1.92%
1962	47,639	+1.18%
1968	49,187	+0.53%
1975	45,239	−1.19%
1982	42,576	−0.86%
1990	42,175	−0.12%
1999	42,796	+0.16%
2007	42,621	−0.05%
2012	41,732	−0.42%
2017	39,700	−0.99%
2023	40,250	+0.23%

Source: EHESS and INSEE (1968–2023)

== University ==
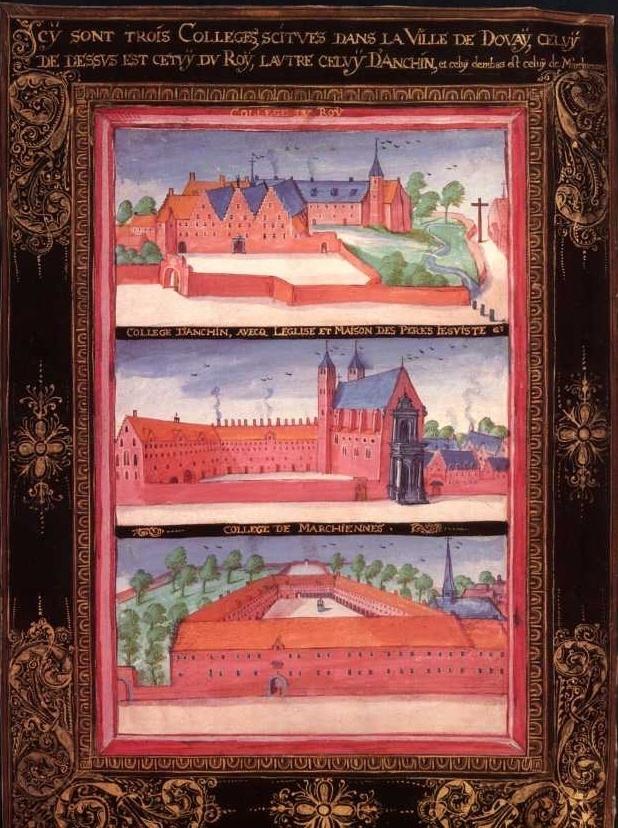
Colleges at University of Douai

The University of Douai was founded under the patronage of Phillip II when Douai belonged to the Spanish Netherlands.

It was prominent, from the 1560s until the French Revolution, as a centre for the education of English Catholics escaping persecution in England. Connected with the University were not only the English College, Douai, founded by William Allen, but also the Irish and Scots Colleges and the Benedictine, Franciscan and Jesuit houses. Throughout Europe, there were around 800 such seminaries. They prepared Jesuits for missionary work in England, with 60 migrating in the 1570s, and around 500 by 1603. The first Jesuits were Edmund Campion and Robert Persons.

The Benedictine priory of St Gregory the Great was founded by Saint John Roberts at Douai in 1605, with a handful of exiled English Benedictines who had entered various monasteries in Spain, as the first house after the Reformation to begin conventual life. The community was established within the English Benedictine Congregation and started a college for English Catholic boys unable to find a Catholic education at home, and pursued studies at the University of Douai. The community was expelled at the time of the French Revolution in 1793 and, after some years of wandering, finally settled at Downside Abbey, Somerset, in 1814.

Another English Benedictine community, the Priory of St. Edmund, which had been formed in Paris in 1615 by Dom Gabriel Gifford, later Archbishop of Rheims and primate of France, was expelled from Paris during the Revolution, and eventually took over the vacant buildings of the community of St Gregory's in 1818. Later, following Waldeck-Rousseau's Law of Associations (1901), this community also returned to England in 1903, where it was established at Douai Abbey, near Reading. Douai School continued as an educational establishment for boys until 1999.

In 1609 the English College published a translation of the Old Testament, which, together with the New Testament published at Rheims 27 years earlier, was the Douay–Rheims Bible used by Anglophone Roman Catholics almost exclusively for more than 300 years.

For a time there was a Carthusian monastery (charterhouse) in Douai, which is now the Musée de la Chartreuse de Douai.

== Notable people ==
Douai was the birthplace of:

- Jehan Bellegambe (1470–1536), early Flemish painter
- François Cosserat (1852–1914), mathematician and engineer
- Henri-Edmond Cross (1856–1910), printmaker, painter
- Gaston Crunelle (1898–1990), classical flautist
- Charles Alexandre de Calonne (1734–1802), statesman
- Marceline Desbordes-Valmore (1786–1859), poet
- Henri-Joseph Dulaurens (1719–1793), novelist
- Giambologna (1529–1608), born as Jean Boulogne, sculptor
- Jacky Henin (born 1960), politician and Member of the European Parliament
- Corinne Masiero (born 1964), actress
- André Obey (1892–1975), playwright
- Nicolas Trigault (1577–1628), Jesuit missionary in China
- Michel Warlop (1911–1947), jazz violinist
- Michel Wibault (1897–1963), aircraft designer and inventor

== Twin towns ==
Douai is twinned with:

- Harrow, United Kingdom
- Recklinghausen, Germany
- Kenosha, United States
- Dédougou, Burkina Faso
- Seraing, Belgium

Former twin towns:

- Puławy, Poland
- Twickenham, United Kingdom
