= Comines, Nord =

Comines
- Commune
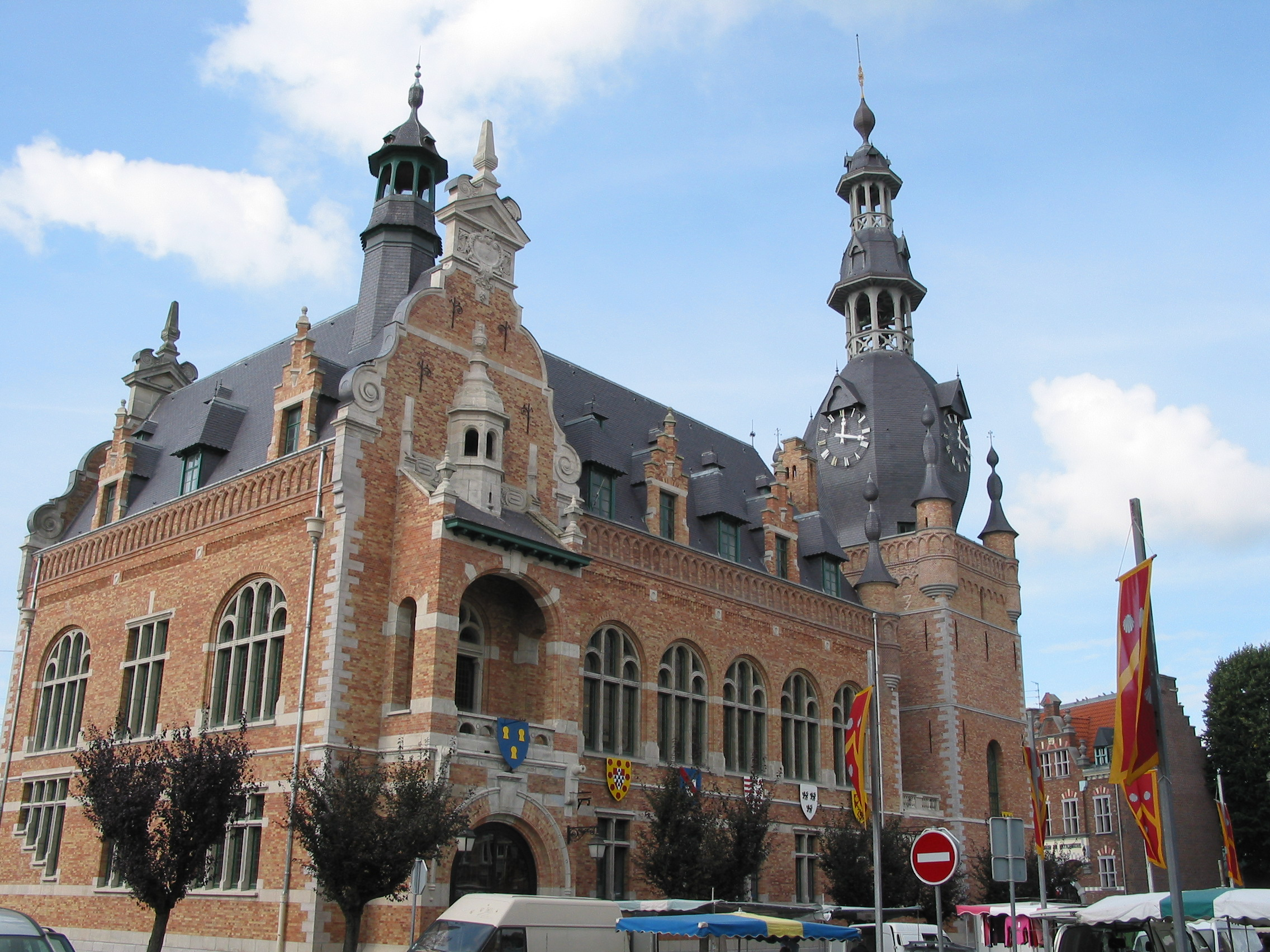
- The Hôtel de Ville and belfry

- Coat of arms
- Location of Comines
- Location within France Location within Hauts-de-France
- Coordinates: 50°45′42″N 3°00′31″E
- Country: France
- Region: Hauts-de-France
- Department: Nord
- Arrondissement: Lille
- Canton: Lambersart
- Intercommunality: Métropole Européenne de Lille

Government
  - Mayor (2020–2026): Éric Vanstaen
- Area^{1}: 16.02 km^{2} (6.19 sq mi)
- Elevation: 18 m (59 ft)
- Highest elevation: 24 m (79 ft)
- Lowest elevation: 11 m (36 ft)
- Population (2023): 12,731
  - Density: 794.7/km^{2} (2,058/sq mi)
- Time zone: UTC+01:00 (CET)
  - Summer (DST): UTC+02:00 (CEST)
- INSEE/Postal code: 59152 /59560
- ^{1} French Land Register data, which excludes lakes, ponds, glaciers > 1 km^{2} (0.386 sq mi or 247 acres) and river estuaries.

Comines (French pronunciation: [kɔmin]; Dutch: Komen) is a commune of the Nord department in northern France.

== Geography ==
The town of Comines sits on the Franco-Belgian border and is split into two parts: Comines (France) and Comines (Belgium), part of the municipality of Comines-Warneton.

== Population ==
Historical population
Year	Pop.	±% p.a.
1968	10,128	—
1975	10,485	+0.50%
1982	10,915	+0.58%
1990	11,320	+0.46%
1999	11,952	+0.61%
2007	12,208	+0.27%
2012	12,787	+0.93%
2017	12,358	−0.68%
2023	12,731	+0.50%
Source: INSEE

== Heraldry ==
Arms of Comines	The arms of Comines are blazoned : Argent, a key palewise sable between 5 cinqfoils gules 2,2,1.

== Sights ==
The Hôtel de Ville and belfry were completed in 1929 and 1932 respectively. The belfry of Comines was listed as a UNESCO World Heritage Site as part of the Belfries of Belgium and France in 2005, in recognition of its importance to the history of municipal power in Europe.

== See also ==
- Communes of the Nord department
