= Veurne-Ambacht =

Veurne-Ambacht was a viscounty ((in Dutch) kasselrij, burggraafschap) in the County of Flanders. Agriculture contributed mostly to the prosperous area.

In the viscountship's capital city Veurne, the Landhuis was the seat of the viscountcy.

Nowadays Veurne-Ambacht is the name of the northwestern corner of the Belgian province of West Flanders.
