= Loos, Nord =

Loos
- Commune
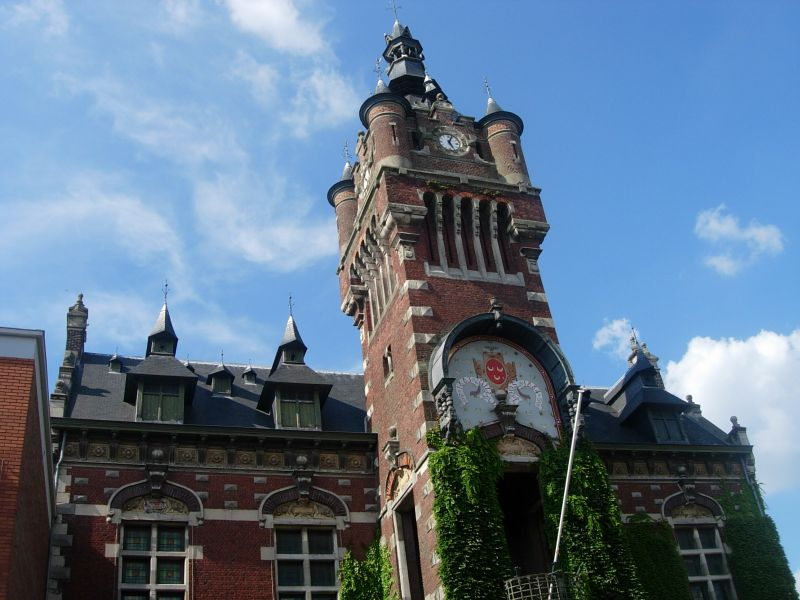
- The Hôtel de Ville

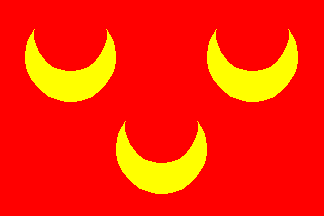
- Flag Coat of arms
- Location of Loos
- Location within France Location within Hauts-de-France
- Coordinates: 50°36′46″N 3°00′52″E
- Country: France
- Region: Hauts-de-France
- Department: Nord
- Arrondissement: Lille
- Canton: Lille-6
- Intercommunality: Métropole Européenne de Lille

Government
  - Mayor (2020–2026): Anne Voituriez
- Area^{1}: 6.95 km^{2} (2.68 sq mi)
- Elevation: 18 m (59 ft)
- Highest elevation: 49 m (161 ft)
- Lowest elevation: 17 m (56 ft)
- Population (2023): 22,567
  - Density: 3,250/km^{2} (8,410/sq mi)
- Time zone: UTC+01:00 (CET)
  - Summer (DST): UTC+02:00 (CEST)
- INSEE/Postal code: 59360 /59120
- ^{1} French Land Register data, which excludes lakes, ponds, glaciers > 1 km^{2} (0.386 sq mi or 247 acres) and river estuaries.

Loos (French pronunciation: [lɔs]) is a commune in the Nord department in northern France (Hauts-de-France).

It is located in the European Metropolis of Lille, and is a suburb of the city of Lille, bordering it on its southwest side. As of 2023, the population of the commune was 22,567. The commune has a land area of 6.95 km^{2} (2.68 sq mi).

== History ==
The Hôtel de Ville, with its large belfry, was inscribed on the UNESCO World Heritage List in 2005 in recognition of its historical importance to municipal power in Europe.

The Kennedy Tower, the tallest tower in the region, was demolished in July 2025.

== Population ==
Historical population

Year	Pop.	±% p.a.
1793	1,040	—
1800	1,007	−0.46%
1806	1,061	+0.87%
1821	1,160	+0.60%
1831	1,564	+3.03%
1836	1,891	+3.87%
1841	3,404	+12.48%
1846	4,117	+3.88%
1851	4,082	−0.17%
1856	5,169	+4.84%
1861	5,172	+0.01%
1866	5,702	+1.97%
1872	6,333	+1.76%
1876	6,706	+1.44%
1881	6,617	−0.27%
1886	7,753	+3.22%
1891	7,924	+0.44%
1896	8,770	+2.05%
1901	9,513	+1.64%

Year	Pop.	±% p.a.
1906	10,640	+2.26%
1911	11,468	+1.51%
1921	12,197	+0.62%
1926	13,865	+2.60%
1931	14,233	+0.53%
1936	14,362	+0.18%
1946	14,678	+0.22%
1954	14,882	+0.17%
1962	18,367	+2.66%
1968	21,007	+2.26%
1975	21,530	+0.35%
1982	20,640	−0.60%
1990	20,657	+0.01%
1999	20,869	+0.11%
2007	21,043	+0.10%
2012	21,176	+0.13%
2017	22,233	+0.98%
2023	22,567	+0.25%

Source: EHESS and INSEE (1968-2023)

== Heraldry ==
Arms of Loos	The arms of Loos are blazoned : Gules, 3 crescents Or.

== Town twinning ==
Loos is twinned with Geseke, Germany.

== See also ==
- Communes of the Nord department
