= Ceres Trampling the Attributes of War =

Painting by Simon Vouet

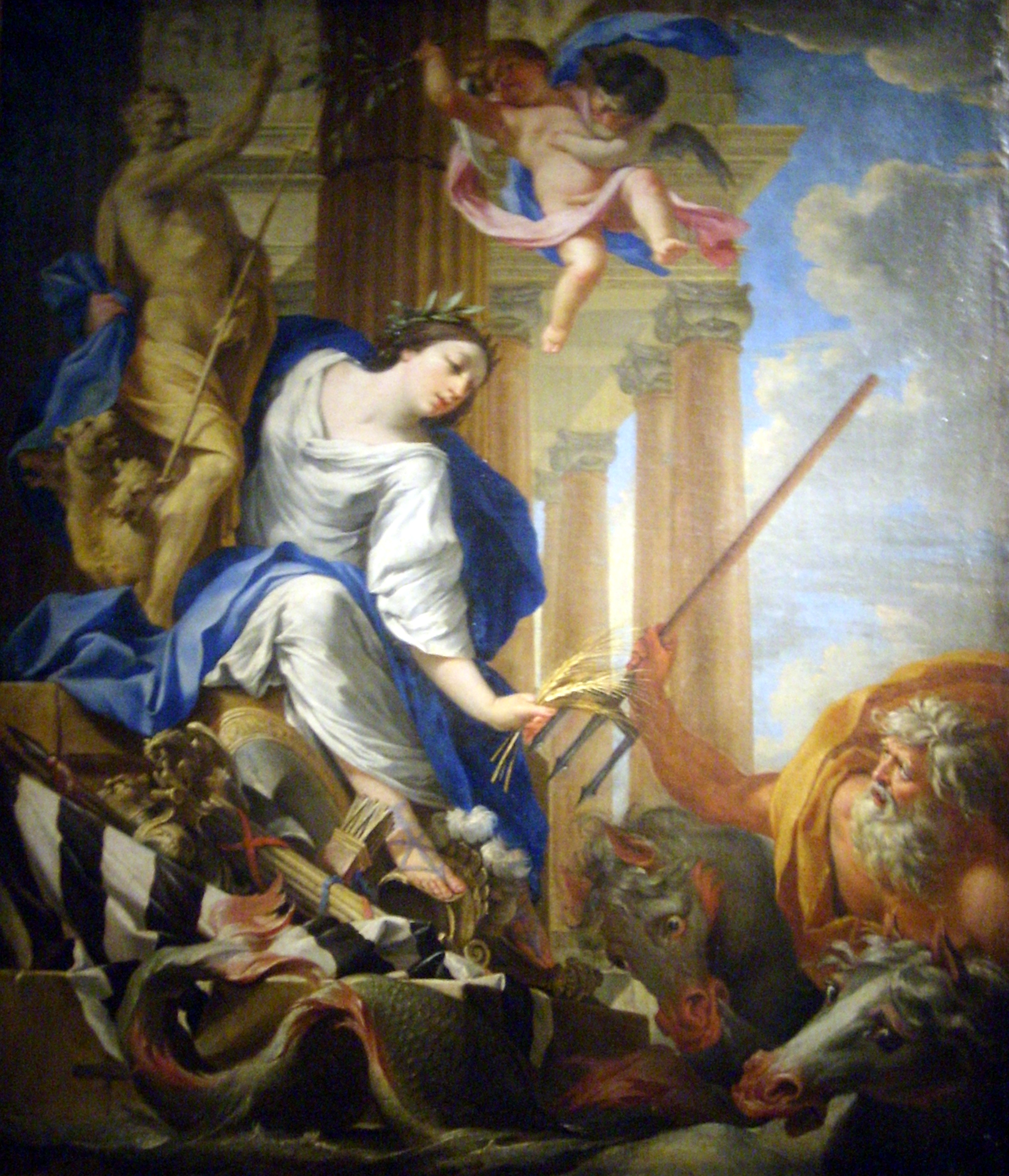
Ceres Trampling the Attributes of War (1635) by Simon Vouet

Ceres Trampling the Attributes of War is an oil on canvas allegorical painting executed in 1635 by the French painter Simon Vouet. It is held in the Musée Thomas-Henry in Cherbourg-Octeville.

The painting depicts Ceres, the goddess of agriculture, triumphing over war. The goddess is represented with ears of corn in her left hand, an iconographic attribute of Ceres.

== Sources ==
- V. V. A. A. (2010). Mitología clásica e iconografía cristiana, pág. 72. R. Areces. ISBN 978-84-8004-942-9.
