= Hôtel de Ville, Bayonne =

Town hall in Bayonne, France

Hôtel de Ville
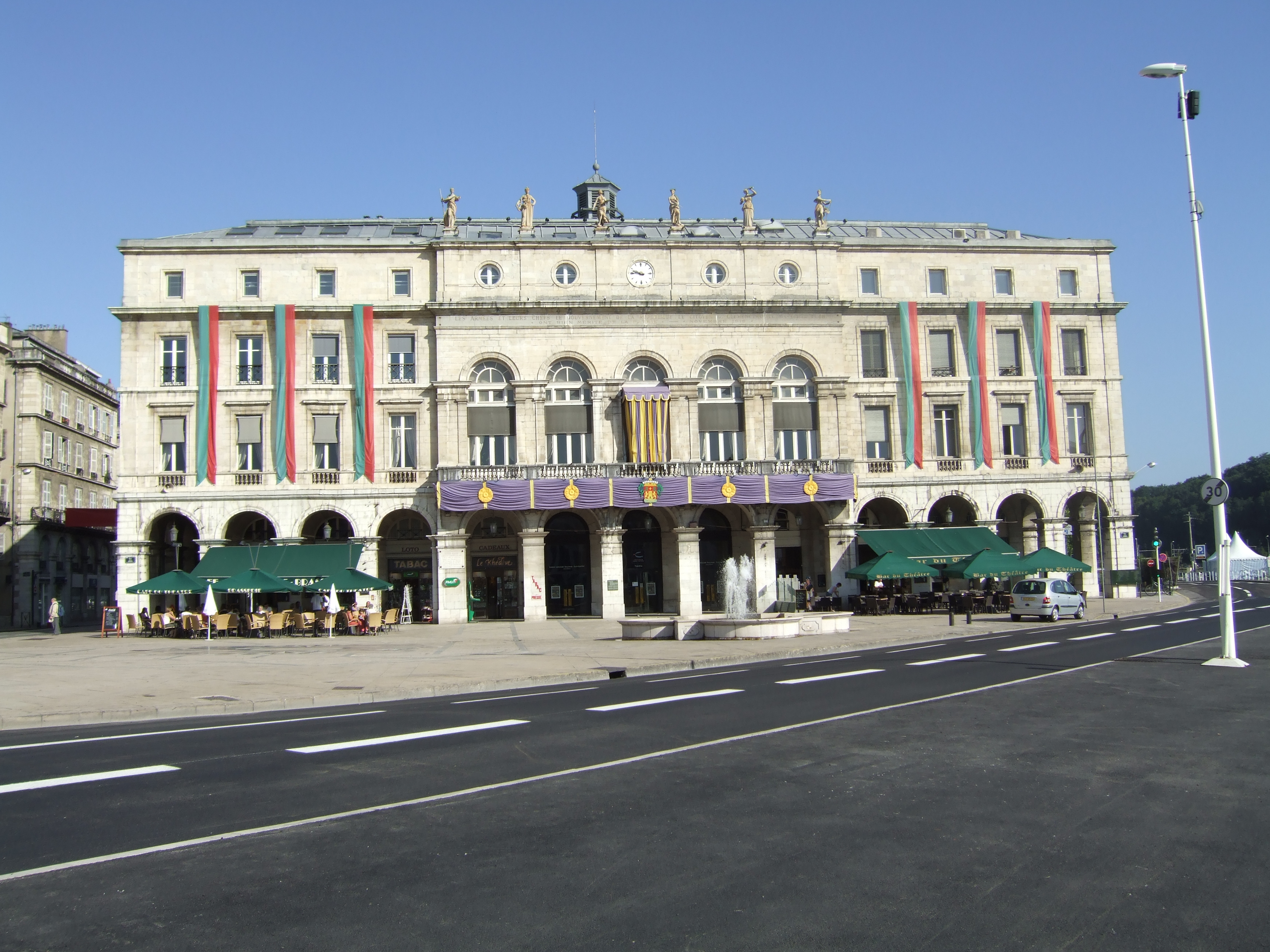
- The main frontage of the Hôtel de Ville in July 2009
- Interactive map of the Hôtel de Ville area

General information
- Type: City hall
- Architectural style: Neoclassical style
- Location: Bayonne, France
- Coordinates: 43.4933°N 1.4751°W
- Completed: 1842

Design and construction
- Architect: Nicolas Vionnois

The Hôtel de Ville (French pronunciation: [otɛl də vil], City Hall) is a municipal building in Bayonne, Pyrénées-Atlantiques, southwest France, standing on the Avenue du Maréchal Leclerc. The building is a mixed use complex which also accommodates the Michel Portal Theatre.

== History ==
The original town hall of Bayonne was an ancient half-timbered building close to Bayonne Cathedral on the Place Publique. Meanwhile, there was a theatre on the west bank of the River Nive, a short distance upstream from its mouth, which had been completed in 1720. By the early 19th century the old town hall was dilapidated and the local council decided to demolish it, and to commission a combined town hall, theatre and customs house complex. The site they selected for the new building was on the west bank of the River Nive, but closer to its mouth than the old theatre.

The foundation stone for the new building was laid by the future government minister, Nicolas Martin du Nord, in the presence of the mayor, François Balasque, on 1 May 1837. It was designed by Nicolas Vionnois in the neoclassical style, built in ashlar stone and was officially opened on 15 January 1842.

The building, which formed a perfect square, was laid out with the theatre on the southeast side facing the Place de la Liberté, the customs house on the northeast side facing the River Adour, and the town hall on the southwest side facing the Rue Bernède. The design involved a symmetrical main frontage of 13 bays facing onto Place de la Liberté. The central section of five bays was slightly projected forward. The ground floor was arcaded with tall arches formed by square-shaped columns supporting imposts, voussoirs and keystones. There were five French doors on the first floor, facing out onto a stone balcony, and five oculi at attic level. The wings were arcaded in the same style and fenestrated with casement windows on the first and second floors and with small square windows at attic level. Above the cornice, surmounting the central section, there were six statues depicting (from left to right) navigation, industry, art, commerce, astronomy and agriculture. Internally, the principal rooms were the theatre auditorium and the Grand Salle (Great Hall) of the town hall.

The first event on the opening night of the theatre, in January 1842, was a performance of La Juive by Eugène Scribe, and the composer, Franz Liszt, performed several piano recitals there in October 1844. The customs staff were subsequently relocated, and the northeast frontage of the building was also allocated to town hall use. Following a major fire on 31 December 1889, which destroyed the town hall archives on the top floor, repairs were undertaken to the roof, and the original stone statues were replaced by new cast iron statues sculpted by Léon Ougnot (for agriculture and navigation), Gustave Deloye (for art and commerce), and Jean-Ernest Boutellier (for industry and astronomy). Following completion of the works, the theatre re-opened with a performance of La traviata by Giuseppe Verdi in January 1890. The actress, Sarah Bernhardt, performed in L'Aiglon by Edmond Rostand in 1910.

In August 1944, after German troops had abandoned Bayonne during the latter stages of the Second World War, the baritone, Michel Dentz sang La Marseillaise from the town hall balcony to celebrate the liberation of the city.

Following completion of an extensive programme of refurbishment works, the theatre re-opened with a performance of Otello by Giuseppe Verdi in April 1967 and, after replacement of the central heating system, it re-opened again with a performance of The Tales of Hoffmann by Jacques Offenbach in June 1985. The interior of the theatre, which is now dedicated to the composer, Michel Portal, who was born in Bayonne, was comprehensively modernised again in the early 21st century.
