= Musée Thomas-Henry =

Art museum in France

Musée des beaux-arts Thomas Henry
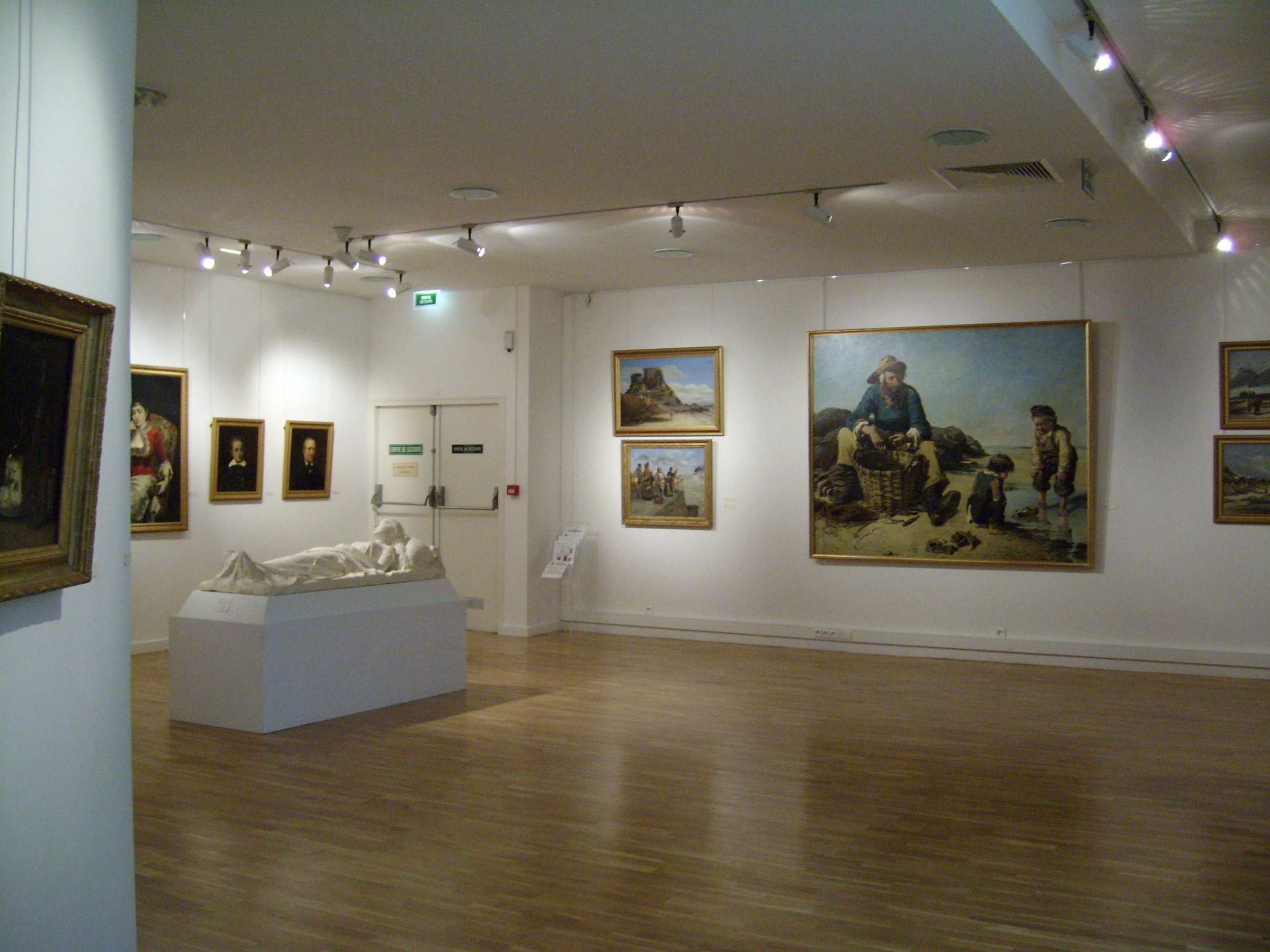
- The Salle Fouace in the Musée Thomas-Henry
- Interactive fullscreen map
- Location: Cherbourg-en-Cotentin
- Coordinates: 49°38′14″N 1°37′23″W

The Musée des beaux-arts Thomas Henry is a museum at Cherbourg-en-Cotentin (Manche) with around 300 artworks, mainly paintings from the 15th to 19th centuries. It has been rated as the third most important collection in Normandy.

== History ==
It was formed after a series of anonymous donations to the city between 1831 and 1835, totalling 163 paintings and later revealed to have been made by Thomas Henry, town councillor and art critic — having lost his two sons, he wanted to allow the city's young people to gain an education in art. These young people included Jean-François Millet, who copied paintings in the museum.

In 1835, a museum was formed from these 163 paintings, including works by Italian 'primitives' such as Fra Angelico (The Conversion of Saint Augustine) and Filippo Lippi (The Burial). The foundational collection was completed by gifts from other inhabitants of Cherbourg, including capitaine Troude (1844), Armand Le Véel (a sculptor and curator of the museum) and the Ono family (who gave Millet's work in 1915). From 1965, the city decided to supplement private donations and state funding for acquisitions, in favor of the Millet fund.

Initially housed in the Hôtel de ville, the museum re-opened in a dedicated cultural centre in 1983, alongside the bibliothèque municipale Jacques-Prévert, on the site of the city's former grain Halles. It received 30,554 visitors in 2009, compared to 18,957 visitors in 2007.

== Collection ==
The museum's collection is wide-ranging and it has been nicknamed the 'little Louvre'. It notably includes a large number of paintings and sculptures by local artists. The most important works include:

- early Italian artists, including Fra Angelico (The conversion of Saint Augustine);
- Italian painters from the Renaissance to the 18th century, including Filippino Lippi (The Burial), Sebastiano Mainardi, Domenico Puligo, Jacopo Bassano, Lavinia Fontana, Palma the Younger, Francesco Furini, Bartolomeo Schedoni, Carlo Saraceni, Francesco Solimena, Giovanni Paolo Pannini;
- Flemish and Dutch art, including Paul Bril, Jacob Jordaens (Adoration of the Magi), Frans II Francken, Pieter Van Mol, Willem van Aelst, Jan van Kessel, senior, Jacob van Loo, Jan Frans van Bloemen, Melchior d'Hondecoeter, Rachel Ruysch, Gérard de Lairesse, Brueghel and Hendrick van Balen;
- Spanish 17th century painters, including Bartolomé Esteban Murillo (Christ at Calvary), Francisco de Herrera the Elder and Antonio Palomino (Saint Sebastian);
- French 17th and 18th century painters, including Nicolas Poussin (Pietà), Philippe de Champaigne, Eustache Le Sueur, Simon Vouet, Jacques Stella, Charles de La Fosse, Hyacinthe Rigaud, Nicolas de Largillierre, Adam Frans van der Meulen, Jean-Baptiste Oudry, Pierre Subleyras, Jean Siméon Chardin, Jean-Baptiste Greuze, Joseph Vernet, Hubert Robert, and Jacques-Louis David.
- the second most important collection of paintings and drawings by Jean-François Millet after that of the musée d'Orsay;
- several paintings by Guillaume Fouace, sculptures by Armand Le Véel, and works by artists from the Nord-Cotentin or represented there (including Gatteville by Paul Signac), and other 19th century French painters, including Théodore Rousseau and Eugène Boudin.
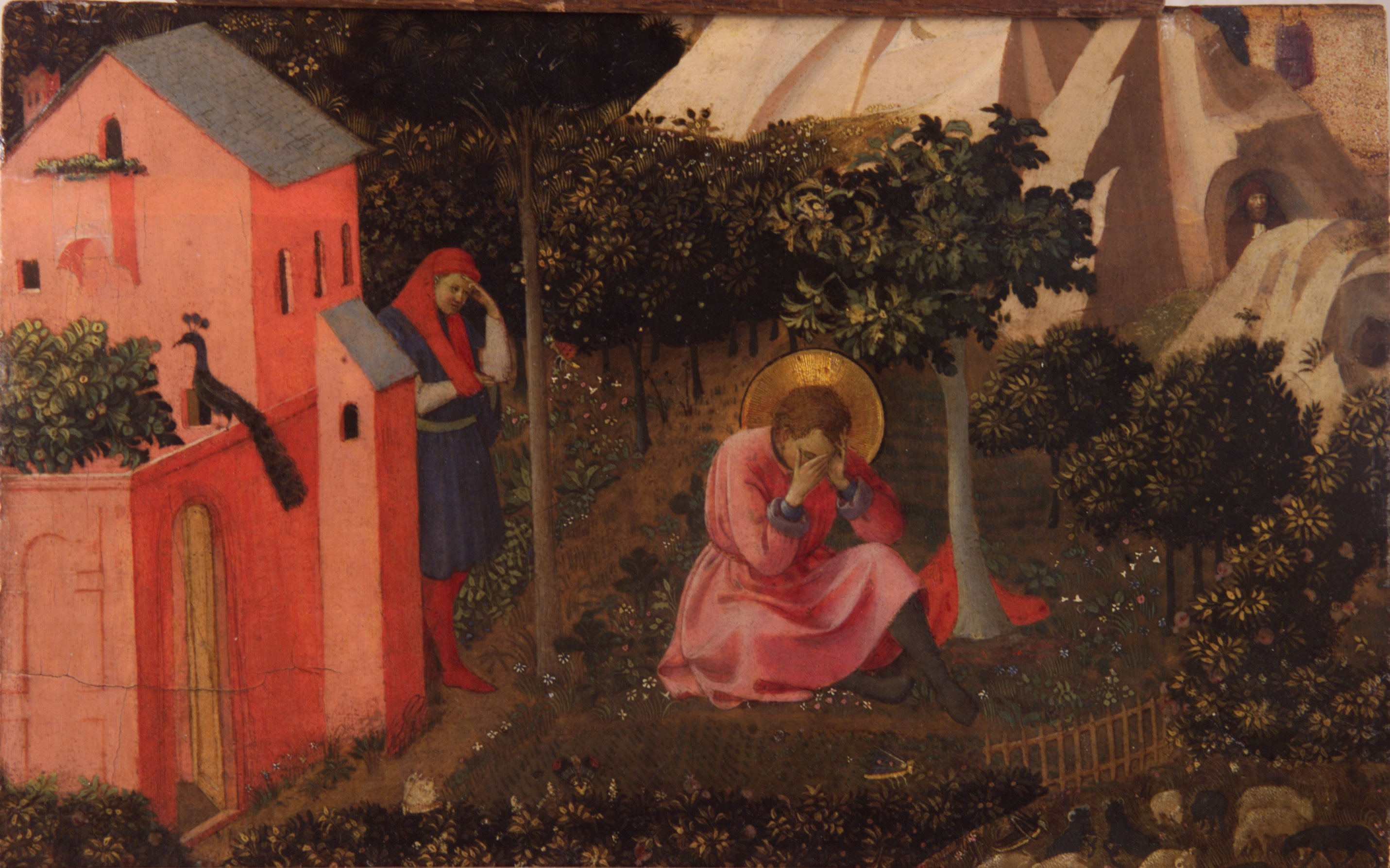
The Conversion of St Augustine by Fra Angelico

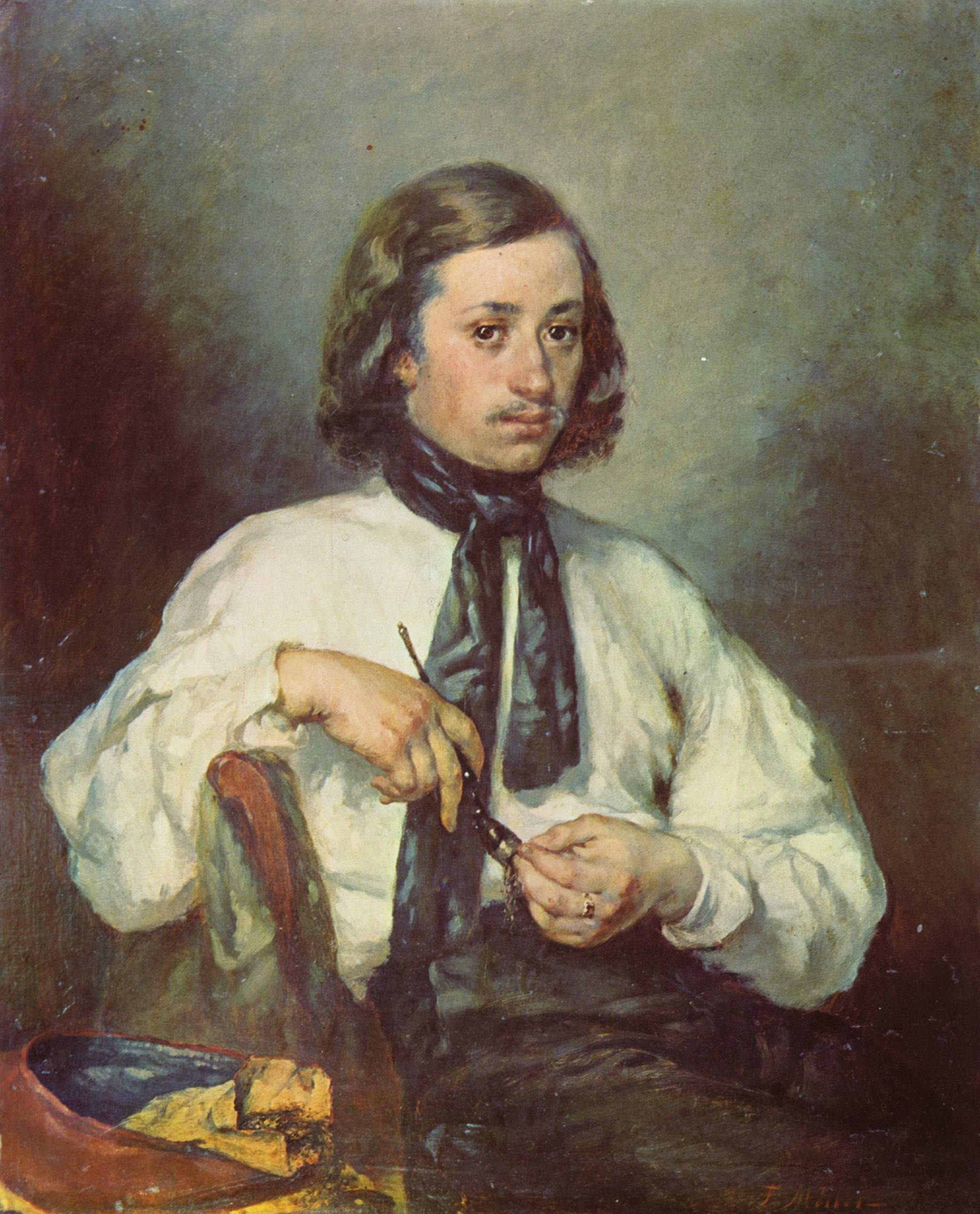
Portrait of Armand Ono by Jean-François Millet

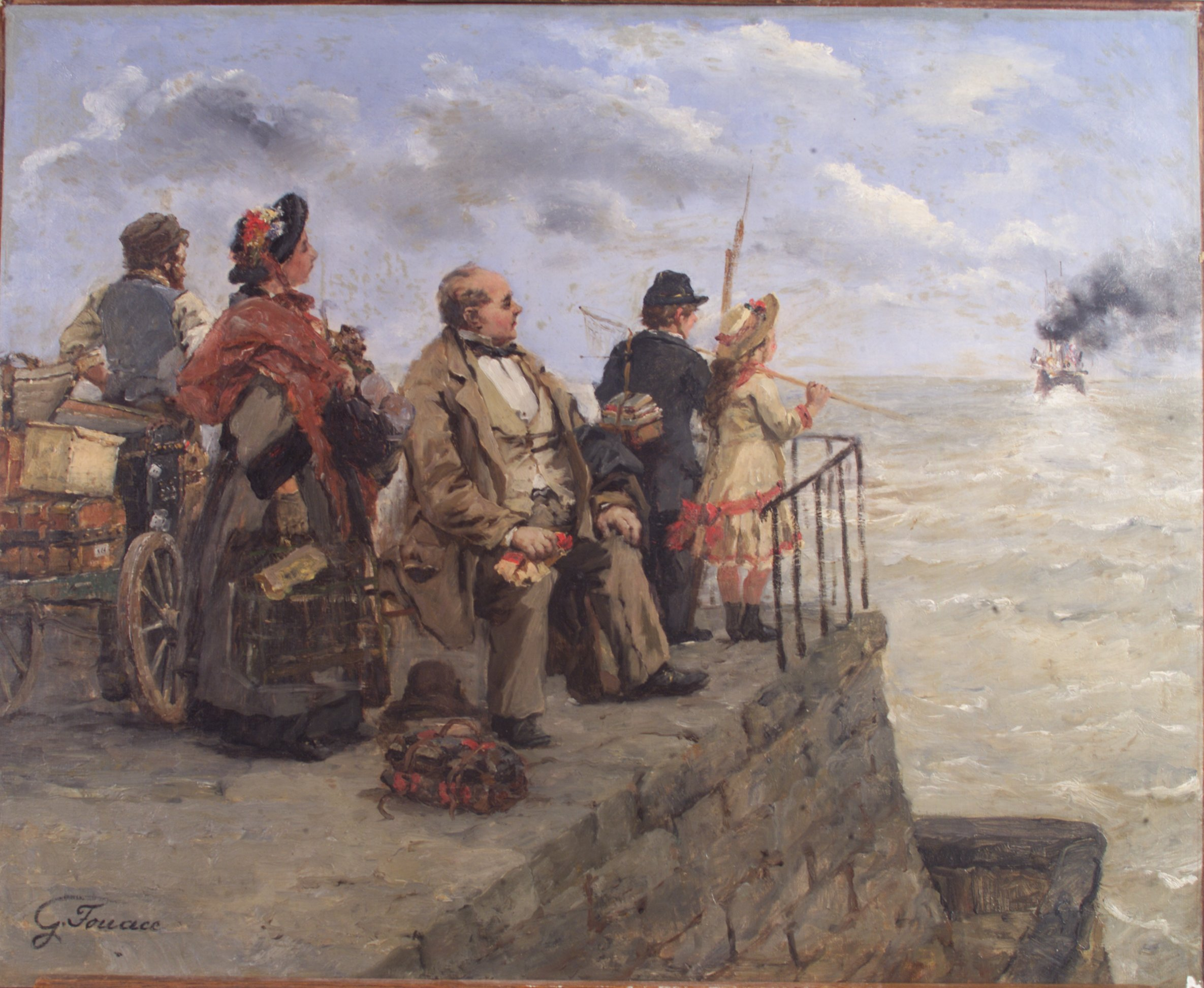
Leaving for Jersey by Guillaume Fouace

== Temporary exhibitions ==
The musée Thomas-Henry has held a biennial exhibition of comic art since 2000 :

- 2000 : Enki Bilal
- 2002 : François Schuiten
- 2004 : André Juillard
- 2008 : Jacques de Loustal
- 2009 : Hugo Pratt
- 2011 : Mœbius
