= Thomas Henry (patron of the arts) =

French painter and patron of the arts

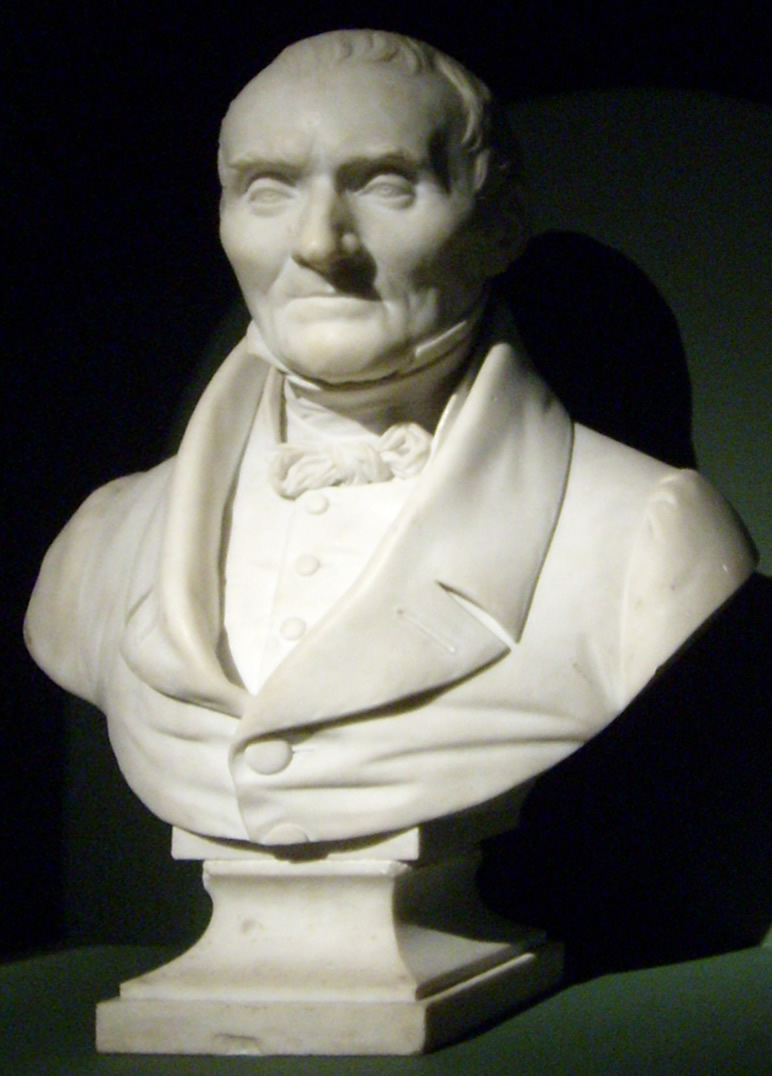
- Bust of Thomas Henry, by Dantan
- Born: 2 March 1766; Cherbourg
- Died: 7 January 1836 (aged 69); Cherbourg
- Known for: painter and patron

Bon-Thomas Henry (1766 in Cherbourg, France – 1836 in Cherbourg) was a French painter and patron of the arts.

After studies in his hometown, Henry was forced while traveling to take shelter during a storm at Bordeaux, where he settled and became a partner with a merchant who sent him to Saint-Domingue. He returned to France after the Haitian Revolution, and learned the restoration of paintings from fellow artists. He was a pupil of Jean-Baptiste Regnault. He augmented his skill in restoration with expertise learned during travels to Italy, Belgium, and England. This led to his gaining a position as an expert commissioner with the Royal Museums.

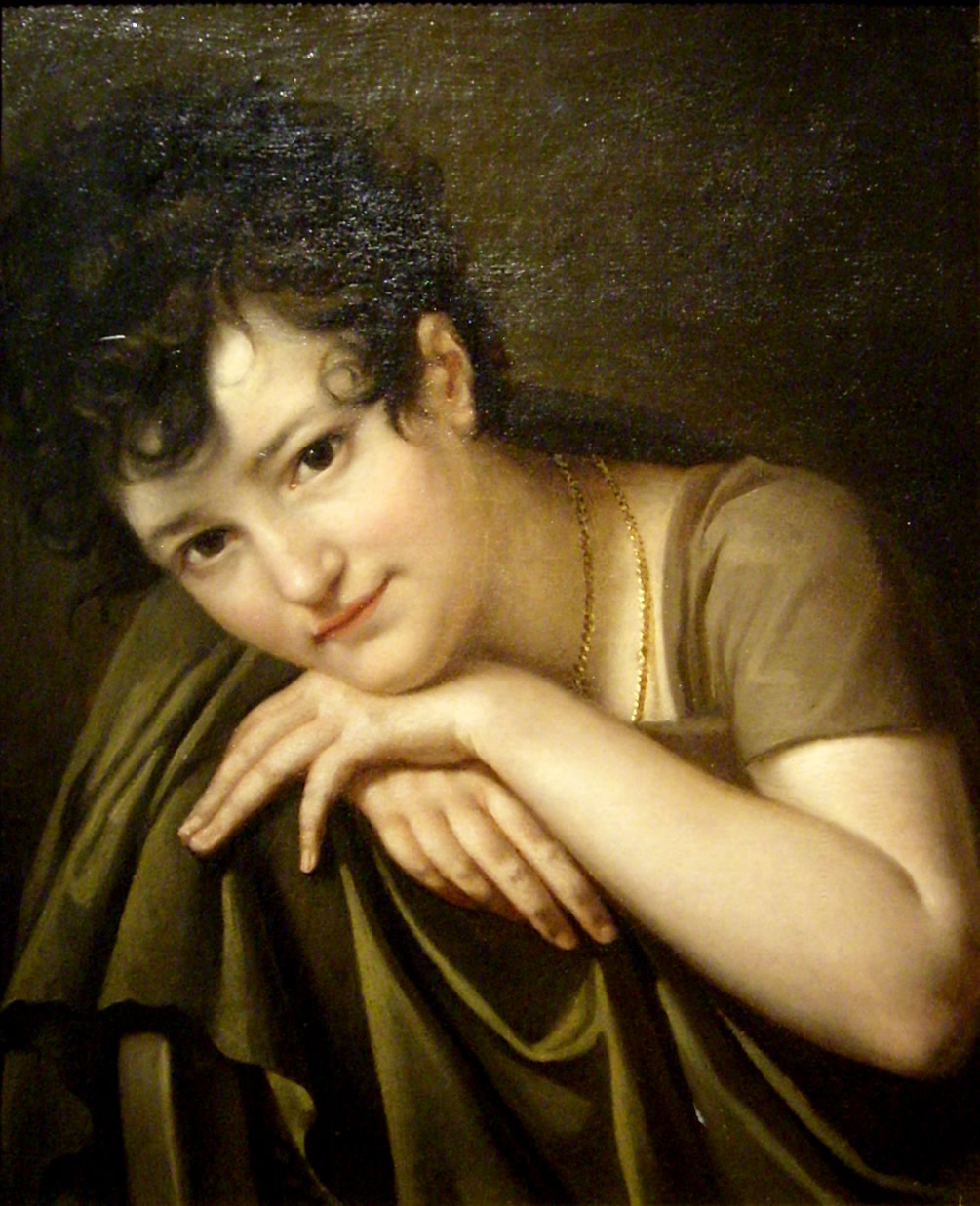
Portrait de jeune femme (Portrait of a young girl) by Thomas Henry, Musée Thomas-Henry

The position facilitated his amassing a significant personal collection of art. When he felt death approaching he decided to "ignite the flame of art" in his native town by donating his collection and establishing a museum. On the 29 July 1835 the town of Cherbourg inaugurated the Musée Thomas-Henry, with Henry's collection of 163 paintings valued at 120,000 francs.

Today the collection forms the basis of the Musée des beaux-arts Thomas Henry, which has the third most important collection of paintings in Normandy, comprising over 300 paintings, dating principally from the fifteenth to nineteenth centuries. The museum is located in Cherbourg-Octeville.

== Further information ==
- Charles Blanc, Le Trésor de la curiosité, Paris, Renouard, 1858
