= Antoine Laurent Dantan =

French sculptor

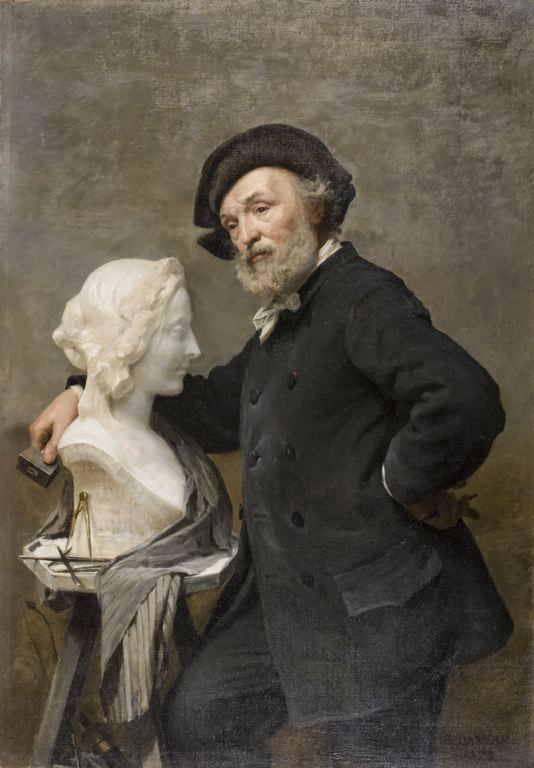
Portrait of Dantan by his son Édouard, 1872

Antoine Laurent Dantan (8 December 1798 in Saint-Cloud – 25 May 1878 in Saint-Cloud) was a French academic sculptor, known as 'Dantan the Elder' to distinguish him from his slightly younger brother, Jean-Pierre Dantan (1800–1869), who was also a sculptor. He won the Prix de Rome for sculpture in 1828.

The Dantan brothers are sometimes confused in the literature. Indeed, they both entered the studio of François-Joseph Bosio, at the École nationale supérieure des beaux-arts in Paris, at the same time in 1823. He was the subject of an article in the French newspaper L'Illustration in 1850. He had a son, Édouard Joseph Dantan (1848–1897), who became a well-known painter in his lifetime.
