= Jean-Pierre Dantan =

French sculptor

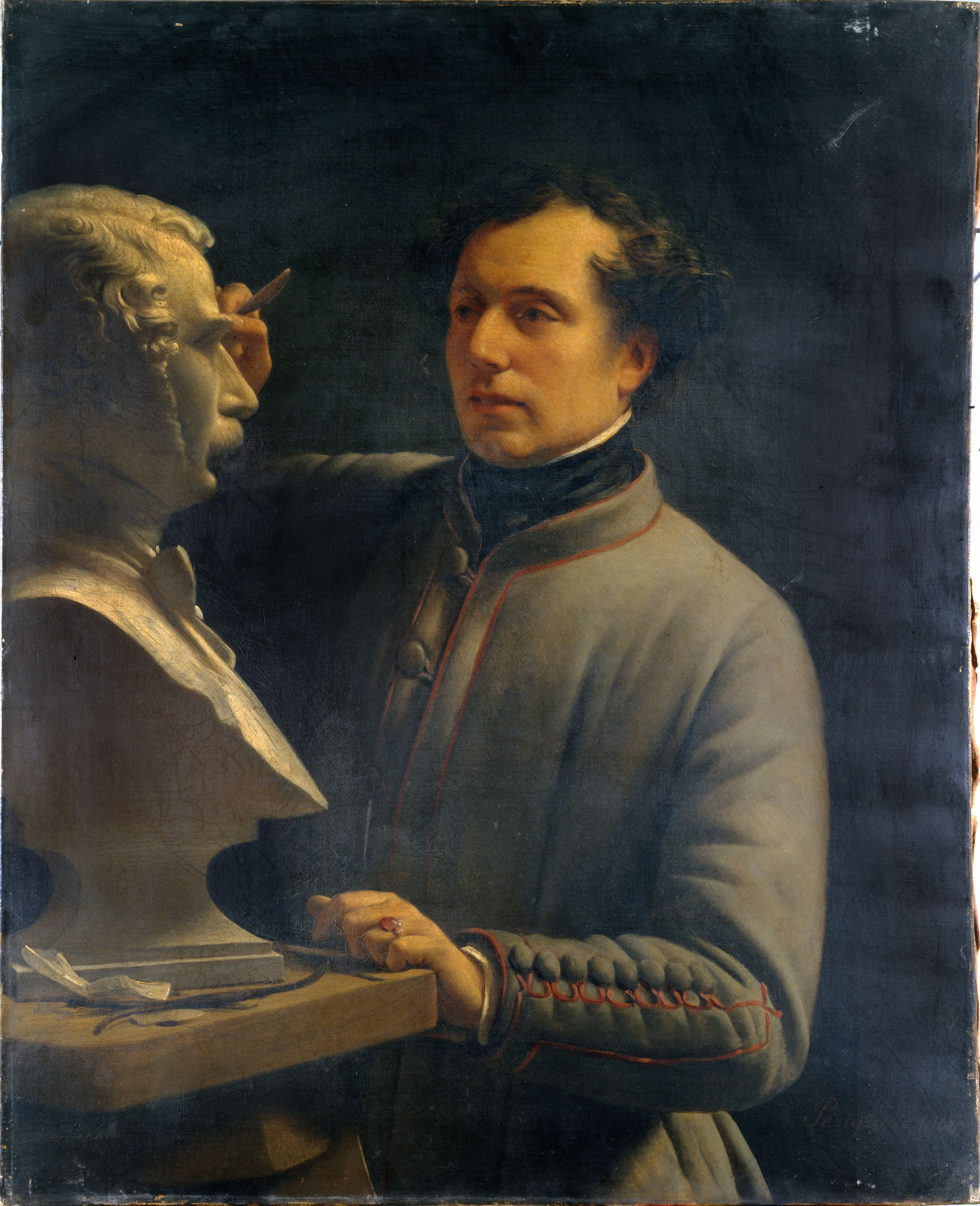
- Dantan in 1848, portrayed by Alexis Joseph Pérignon while working on a bust of the artist.
- Born: December 28, 1800; Paris, France
- Died: September 6, 1869; Baden-Baden, Germany
- Education: François-Joseph Bosio
- Known for: Sculpture, caricature
- Notable work: Victor Hugo, 1832; Berlioz, 1833

Jean-Pierre Dantan (28 December 1800, in Paris – 6 September 1869, in Baden-Baden), known as Dantan the Younger, was a French portrait sculptor. His subjects include many famous figures from the realms of politics (for example, Talleyrand, William Douglas-Hamilton), music and the arts (Beethoven, Paganini, Verdi, Chopin, Liszt, Berlioz), and literature (Victor Hugo, Balzac). He is said to be the inventor of the sculptural caricature.

== The Dantan family ==
He was born in Paris, where his father was a wood carver, and Dantan's first teacher. His elder brother Antoine-Laurent ("Dantan the Elder", 1798–1878) was also a sculptor. The Dantans are sometimes confused in the literature. Indeed, they both entered the studio of François-Joseph Bosio, at the École nationale supérieure des beaux-arts in Paris, at the same time in 1823.

From the perspective of the art world of the time, Antoine-Laurent was the more talented brother. He won the Prix de Rome in 1828 and began a successful career producing officially commissioned, academic sculpture. Although gaining less official recognition than his brother's, Jean-Pierre's work gained a following among the intelligentsia, and is better remembered today, as well as being more influential on other artists, having inspired, in particular, Honoré Daumier.

Both brothers are buried in the family plot in Père Lachaise Cemetery (Division IV) in Paris. The tomb is decorated with relief medallions by Antoine-Laurent (of Dantan père and of Jean-Pierre) and by Jean-Pierre (of Antoine-Laurent and of Mme Dantan).

In a later generation, his nephew Édouard Joseph Dantan (1848–1897) knew some success as a painter, but is now remembered only as a minor artist.

== Career ==
Antoine-Laurent was capable of large scale historic and figure sculpture, but Jean-Pierre's talents were better suited to portraiture, and to a smaller scale. This meant he was less likely to win prizes such as the Prix de Rome, but he was not without success. He exhibited at the Salons, and won a second class medal in 1831. And from very early in his career he had begun to explore the style that would ultimately make him the better-remembered sculptor: the first of his works to gain notice was a portrait bust of the painter César Ducornet in the guise of an accursed poet. Dantan's talent as a portraitist who could add expressive, romantic emotion to his subject was already apparent. (Apart from his work as a sculptor, Dantan was also a capable graphic caricaturist.)

It is for such caricature busts and also statuettes that Dantan is remembered, and for which he received most praise during his own lifetime. During the 1820s he had begun to frequent the salon of Pierre-Luc-Charles Cicéri, and in 1831 he produced a caricature bust of Cicéri. This gained him a certain renown throughout artistic circles in Paris, while his connection to Cicéri eventually gave him access to the salon of the Princesse de Belgiojoso. The members of de Belgiojoso's circle included Italian revolutionaries, political radicals, and prominent members of the European artistic intelligentsia. From this milieu, Dantan began to receive many requests, either for original caricatures or for casts of busts he had already made. For example, in an 1835 letter to Madame Hanska, Balzac speaks with pride of Dantan's caricatures of himself (there were two).

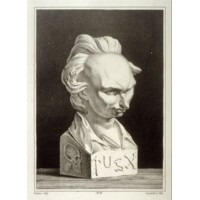
Drawing of one of Dantan's caricature busts of Victor Hugo.

A frequent feature of Dantan's caricatures was the inclusion of a rebus on the socle, allowing the identity of the subject to be made out. In the illustration of the bust of Hugo, an axe (une hache, which sounds like the name of the letter H in French), the letters UG, and some crossed bones (des os, where os is pronounced "O" in the plural) are visible, spelling "HUGO". The rebus for the bust of the actor Pierre-Frédéric Achard was a letter A on a chariot (char).

Such games with "codes" would have enhanced the "counter cultural" effect of the works, in a society where caricature was an important political tool. But the rebuses also played the simple role of identification, because not all of Dantan's caricature's were immediately recognizable. Dantan appears to have been influenced both by the theories of phrenology and of Romanticism, with its emphasis on expressiveness, so he may have aimed as much to depict the true essence of his subjects as much as their exact physical semblance, and the small scale of his works would have emphasized this, allowing him greater freedom in the handling of his materials.

In fact, however, unlike comparable artists such as Daumier and David d'Angers, Dantan did not risk really engaging with the political issues of his time. This may not be very surprising considering the sort of risk that would have been involved. Writers and artists associated with Charles Philipon's magazines La Caricature and Le Charivari, including Philipon himself, were imprisoned during the reign of Louis Philippe. It is known, however, that Dantan made a bust of Louis Philippe, but it was never exhibited and is now lost, while he had some issues when in London (1833–34) for caricatures he made of the royal family, even though these were relatively harmless.

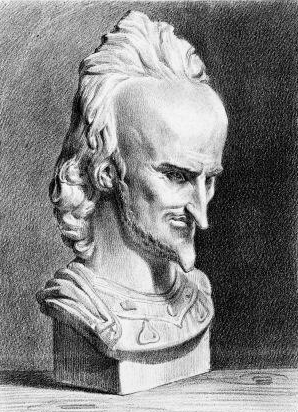
Illustration by Grandville of Dantan's bust of Nicolas-Prosper Levasseur.

It may be that Dantan preferred a more reliable source of income than was available on commissions from the artistic and political avant-garde. He had begun in the 1820s making many "serious" portrait busts of the celebrities of the time. This was a commercial venture, and Dantan produced hundreds of busts, modelled on a small scale (20 to 60 cm high), and available in plaster and bronze editions for relatively low prices. This practice was his main activity before he became known for his caricatures, and it remained his predominant output in his later years. This work, however, is rarely interesting to modern eyes.

The better to sell his work, Dantan established a "Dantanorama" in the Passage des Panoramas in Paris, where he sold both is caricatures and serious works. He produced a catalogue illustrated by the caricaturist Grandville, first printed in 1834, which gives a good idea of his output. Grandville's illustrations of the Dantanorama itself make it look a grander place than it perhaps was. Contemporary photographs show a shop sufficiently cluttered to suggest an attitude of "pile 'em high and sell 'em cheap" and this attitude was certainly detected by some commentators of the time. In 1835, an anonymous critic in L'Artiste warned the elder Dantan, Antoine-Laurent, not to chase after merchandise, nor after popularity, and to learn from the unfortunate example of his younger brother who had the talent to be great artist but who had abandoned art for a profession, sculpture for caricature, and had prostituted the noble tradition of sculpture.

Dantan died in Baden-Baden, aged 68.

== Reputation and influence ==
Arguably this last consideration, the concern that Dantan was too commercial and too populistic, is among the most fascinating questions about the artist. Most critics agree that he was not a great artist, but his work is an important link in the history of caricature, and even if they are artistic failings, both commercialization and populism are important aspects of the Paris which Dantan's younger contemporary, Charles Baudelaire would describe as essentially modern.

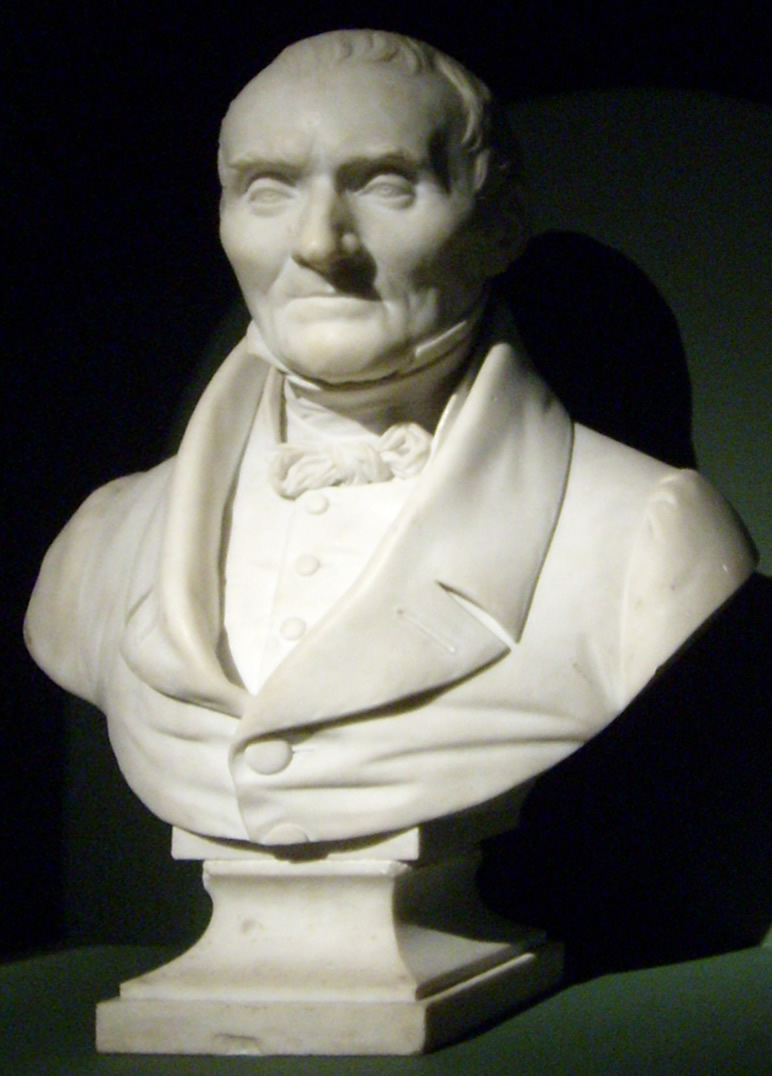
The painter and patron Thomas Henry, by Dantan.

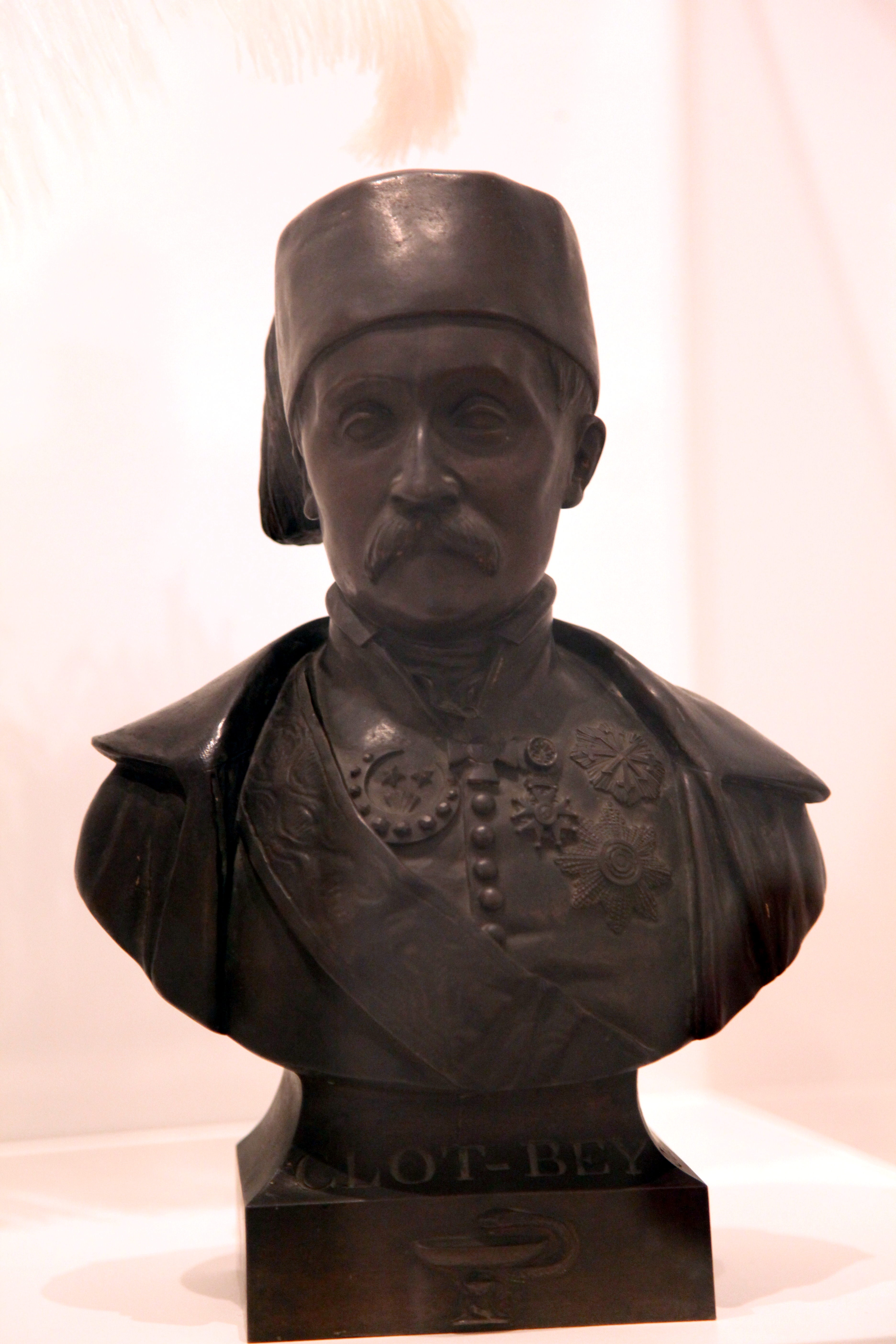
Bust of Clot-Bey by Dantan (Museum of Grenoble)

Commending Dantan's caricatures in L'Artiste in 1839, Gustave Planche mocked Dantan's subjects, whose appetite for notoriety made them commission their own disfigurement in caricature, and then he pointed out how Dantan's works, apparently not very like their subjects, first provoke the reaction, "How horrible!" but then the realization "But it so looks like him!". If the question is Dantan's own status, it would be too much to read into this a pre-figurement of Picasso's remark about his own portrait of Gertrude Stein, "Everybody says that she does not look like it but that does not make any difference, she will." The matter might be different if the question is the position of caricature.

Caricature is a comparatively new form. The Oxford Dictionary of Art notes that "political caricature as we know it today emerged in the last three decades of the 18th century" in Britain, where artists such as Gillray learned how to distill the likenesses of kings and politicians into recognizable stereotypes. But the greatest master of the genre was Honoré Daumier in nineteenth century France. This is close to what the 1911 Encyclopædia Britannica has to say, but Britannica also notes the importance of Dantan's "admirable portrait-busts" alongside the realistic sketches of Henri Monnier and the low life drolleries of Nicolas Toussaint Charlet in the development of the French caricature towards Daumier. Dantan's natural talent as a portraitist, his skill at capturing a rapid likeness, his interest in phrenology, and his association via the salons of Cicéri and the Princesse de Belgiojoso with an intellectual elite interested in a new form of realism, a romantic or expressive realism that captured the psychological realities of human life, would have pushed him to a form of caricature that was neither about superficial resemblance, nor about manufacturing stereotypes. Such an "evidently talented portraitist, whose talents nevertheless did not reach the level of David d'Angers, nor the intensity of Honoré Daumier," might nonetheless be representative of a new style of caricature, and even of art, that moved away from just presenting its subject to actively representing, revealing, and perhaps to an extent creating it.

He produced a grotesquely antisemitic 1833 caricature statue of financier Nathan Mayer Rothschild.

If we avoid speculating on the nature of caricature and simply point to examples, then it is clear that Dantan was a prominent exemplar of the caricaturist in Paris, and that his busts and statuettes are good examples of caricature. He may have refrained from much political caricature, but his busts and statuettes were exaggeratedly expressive if not always quite satirical (a statuette of Liszt has the "spiderlike composer take possession of his piano with an inspired air and spindly limbs"). He was undoubtedly a direct influence on Daumier, and he was a close associate of other caricaturists. Grandville illustrated his catalogue, and he was good friends with the gifted, younger graphic caricaturist, Cham. Dantan had made a caricature bust of Cham, and in his CHAM, sa vie et son oeuvre Félix Ribeyre reproduces a drawing by Dantan of Cham being carried about by his pet dog at the baths in Baden-Baden, which were popular with Parisian society. Ribeyre and Pierre Véron tell stories of Dantan and Cham playing jokes and pranks at Baden-Baden. Dantan's most prominent students were Gustave Deloye and Prosper d'Épinay.

And if nothing else, the five hundred or so sculptures that Dantan made from a detailed documentary of a significant portion of Parisian society in the years 1830-1850.

That Dantan is a relatively important artist in his own right, and certainly significant in the history of caricature, combined with his extremely high productivity, might provoke the question as to why he is not better known today. Part of the answer is that much of his production consisted of the essentially uninteresting "serious" work. But perhaps more important is the fact that on his death, his much younger wife, Elise Polycarpe Moutiez, 28 years his junior, destroyed many of the moulds of for his caricature busts, as well as much other material relating to her husband. This may have been done to increase the commercial value of his surviving works, or to boost his artistic reputation, but it may also have been done out of some concern for respectability, as she is also reputed to have destroyed any trace of a secret museum of erotic work within the Dantanorama. Whatever the reasons, Dantan's reputation declined into near oblivion until Janet Seligman published a monograph on him in 1957. His artistic status has remained somewhat ambiguous, as his work has provoked both positive and negative reactions from critics since his own time to the present. Laurent Baridon, taking into account both the verve of the caricatures and the fatuity of the ever-so-bourgeois "serious" busts, as well as the rather unsophisticated games with rebuses, concludes that Dantan is himself as interesting as a caricature of an artist as he is as an artist.

A recent (late 2009) sale from a catalogue of thirty busts and statuettes by Dantan, was held by Bertrand Talabardon et Bertrand Gautier in Paris. The works were priced from €10,000 to "much more". The sale included thirty caricatures, mostly of musicians, believed to have come from the collection of Duke Maximilian Joseph in Bavaria. For those who cannot afford such prices, works by Dantan can be found in many museums and private collections, especially in France and Britain. The Carnavalet Museum in Paris has the most significant collection.
