= Guillaume Fouace =

French painter

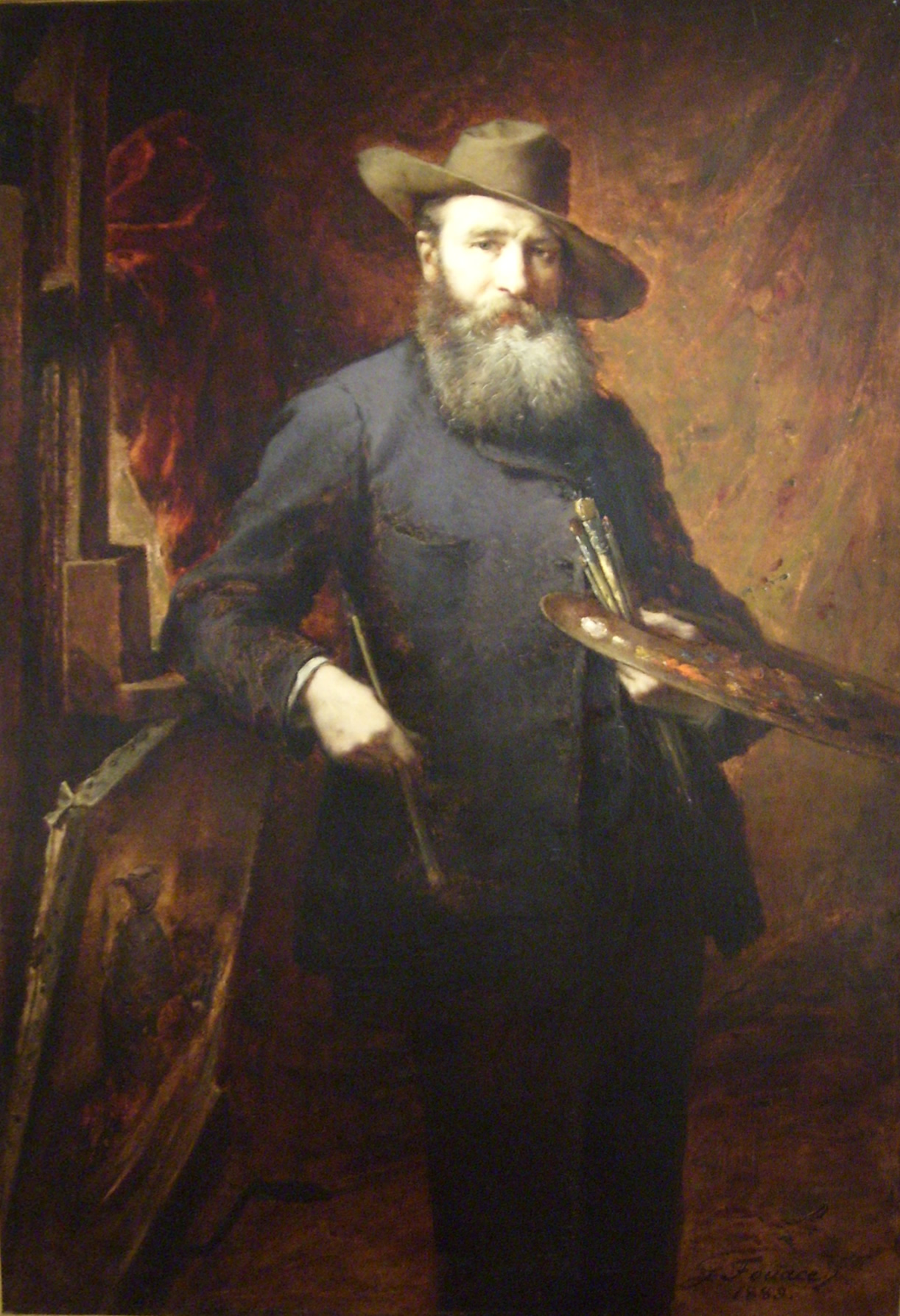
Self portrait, aged 36

Guillaume Fouace (22 May 1837, Réville – 7 January 1895, Paris) was a French painter. He produced over 700 paintings in a realist style, mainly portraits, still lifes and landscapes - the Musée d'Orsay has some of them, whilst 40 are displayed in a 'Salle de Fouace' at the Musée Thomas-Henry in Cherbourg-en-Cotentin.

== Life ==
Born to farmers in Réville, a hamlet of Jonville, he took over the family farm aged 24 after his father's death. He had produced drawings since he was a child and his talent was recognised by the museum curator in Cherbourg (Cherbourg-en-Cotentin since 2016), who gained Fouace two municipal bursaries from Cherbourg to study art in Paris (as had his predecessor from Cotentin, Jean-François Millet). There he studied under Adolphe Yvon before setting up a studio as a portrait painter. He then fought in the Franco-Prussian War. In 1870, three years after arriving in Paris, he exhibited at the Paris Salon. In 1873 he exhibited his first still lifes.

After the war he moved permanently to Paris with his wife, the daughter of a pharmacist in Cherbourg who he had married in 1874. However, he did not forget the Cotentin - in 1878 he painted 19 canvases of biblical scenes such as the Annunciation, Flight from Egypt and the journey of the Magi for the vaults of the church at Montfarville, while for its choir he painted a copy of Leonardo da Vinci's Last Supper.

He died in 1895 of a pulmonary disease after receiving the medal of a Chevalier of the Légion d'honneur. His tomb in Réville features a recumbent white marble statue of his daughter Beatrix (1875–1888).

== Gallery ==
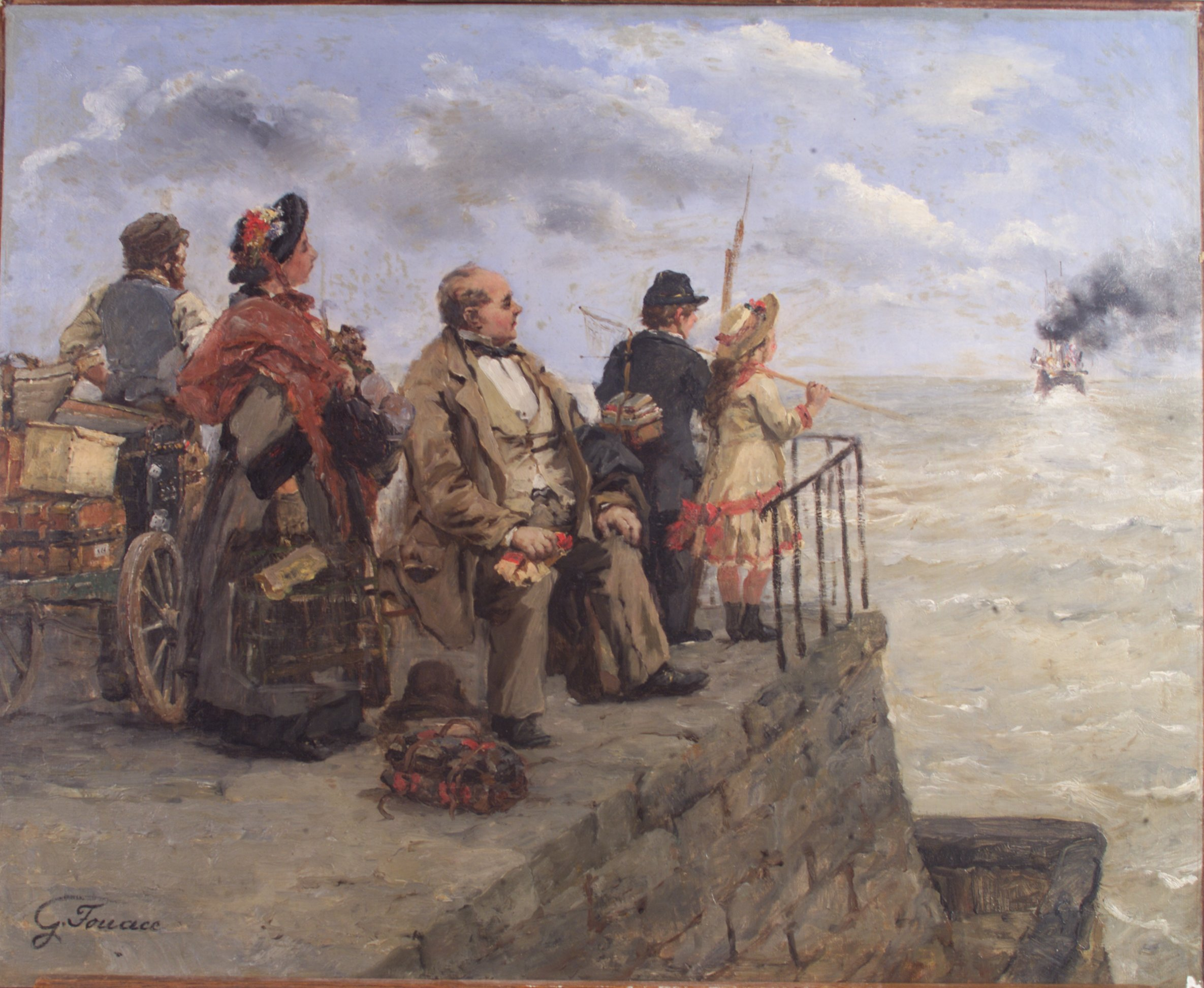
Le Départ pour Jersey (Leaving for Jersey), circa 1883, Musée de Cherbourg.

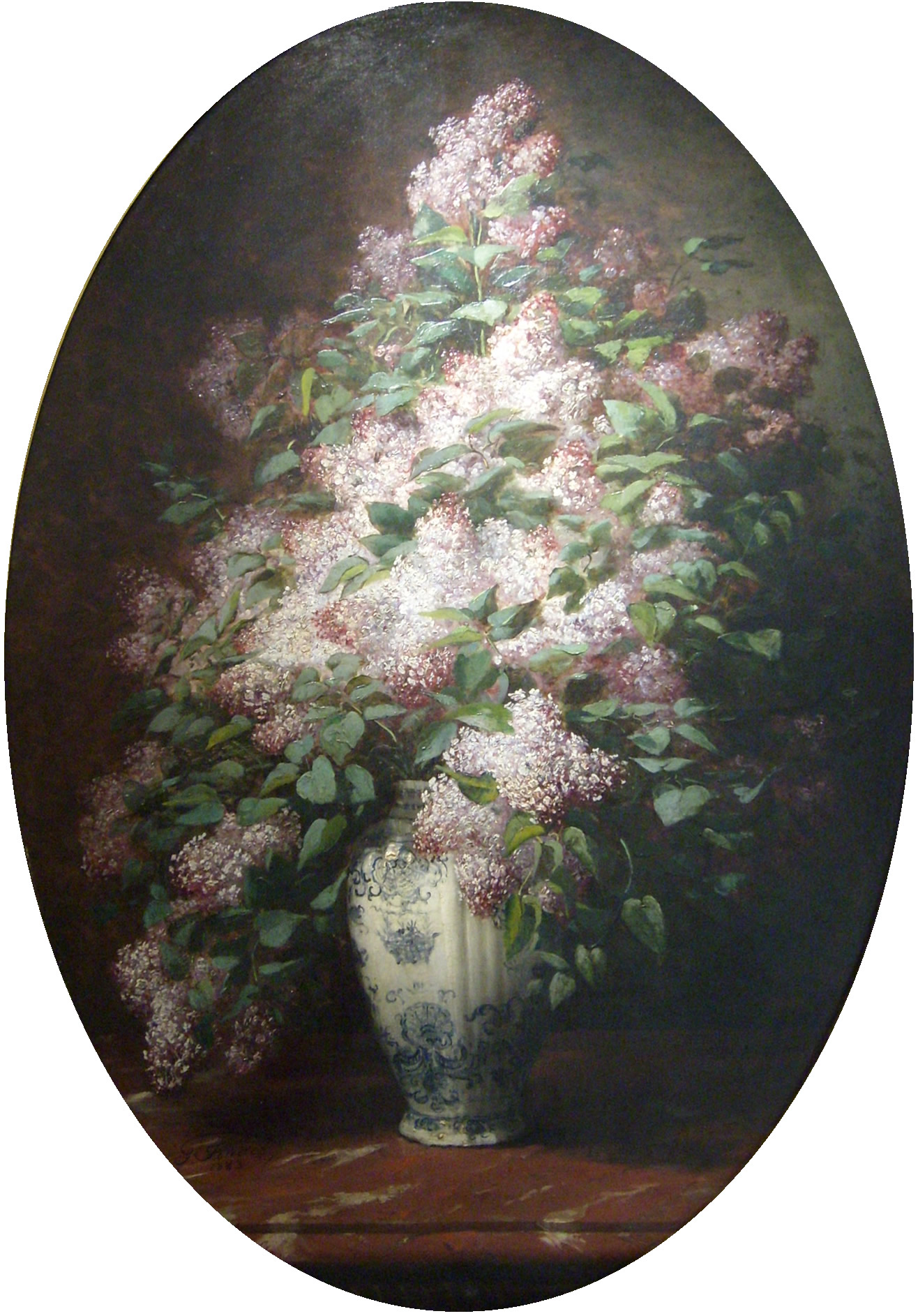
Bouquet de Lilas

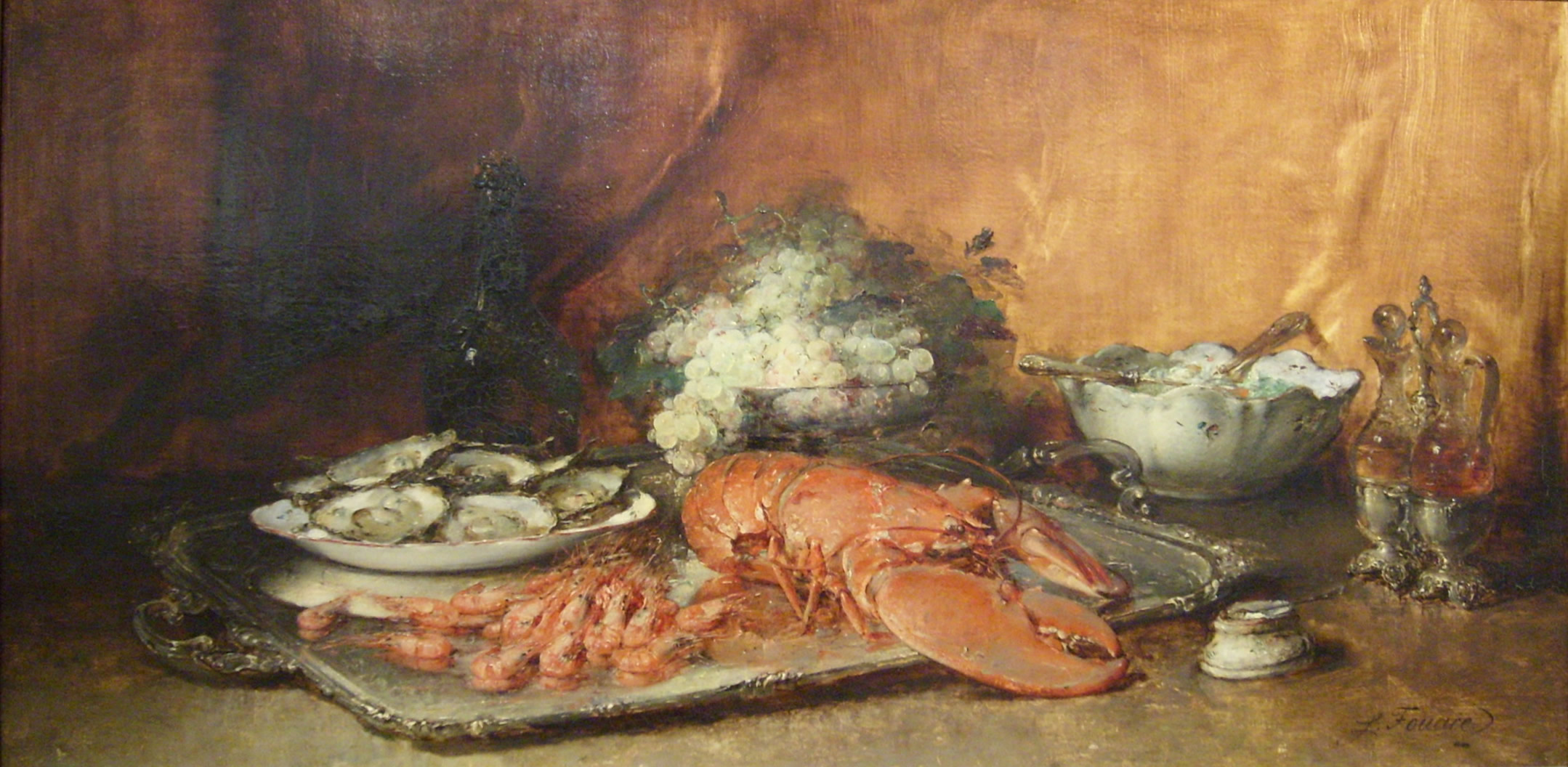
Déjeuner de carême

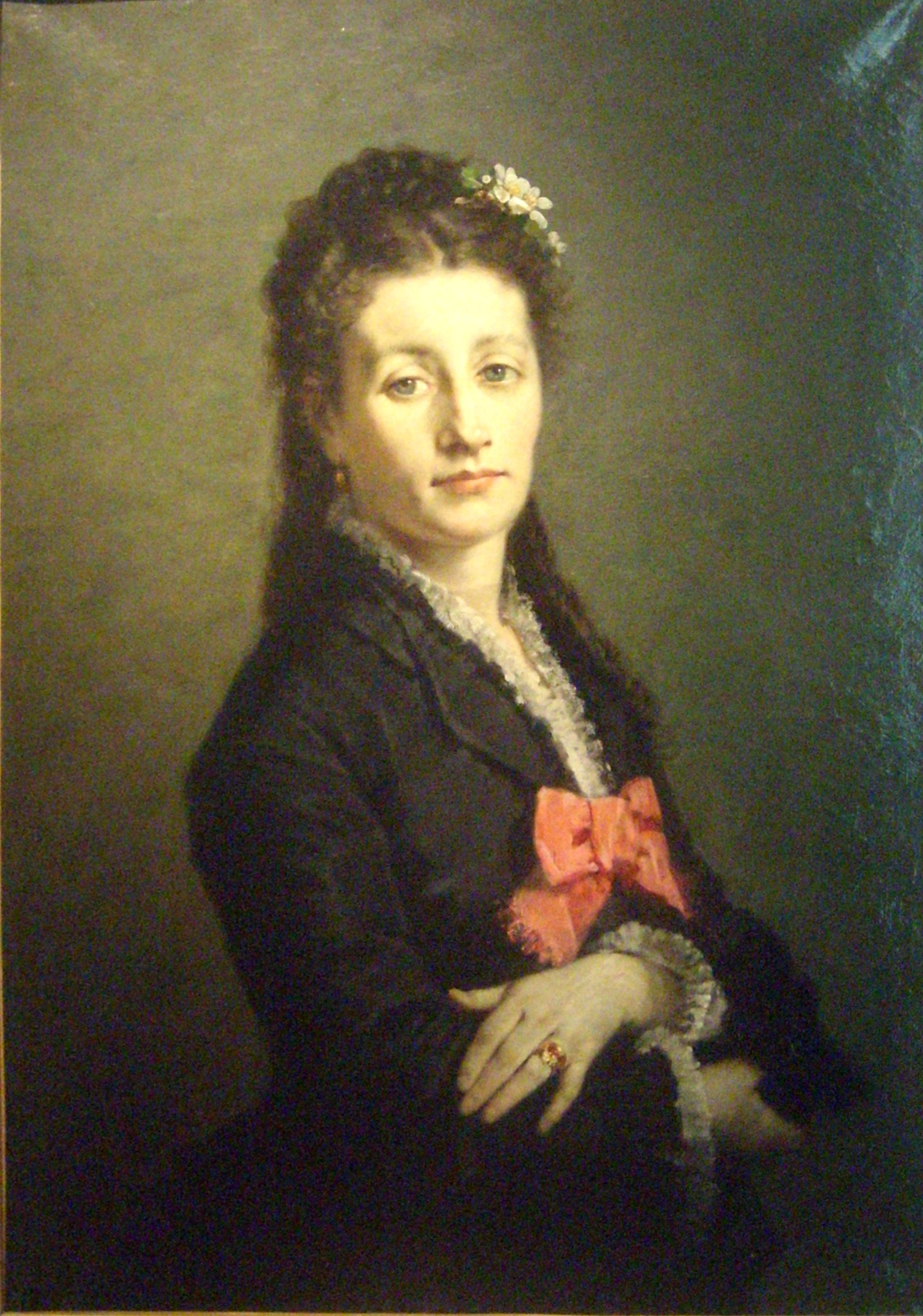
Femme au noeud

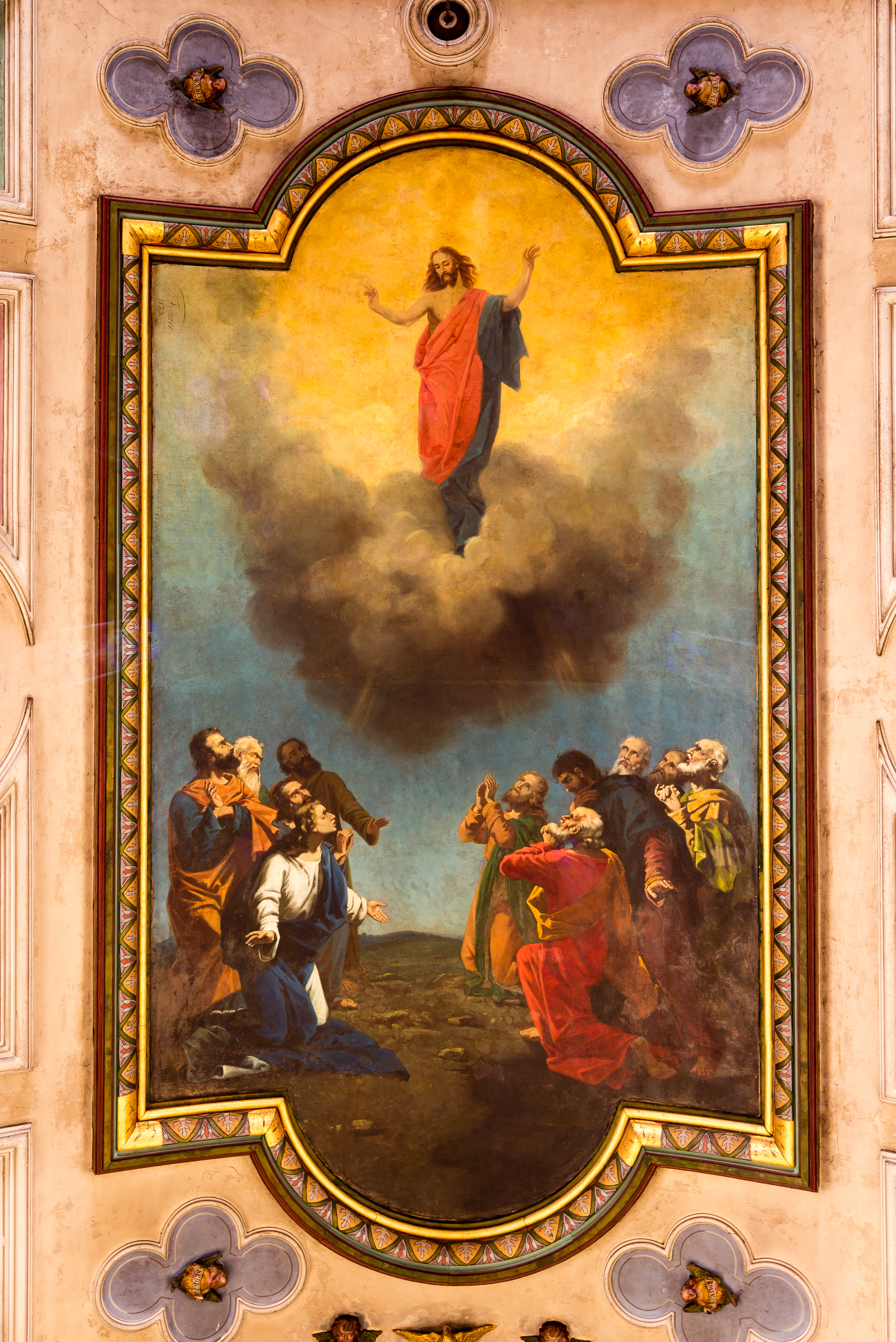
L'Ascension, église Notre-Dame, Montfarville, France

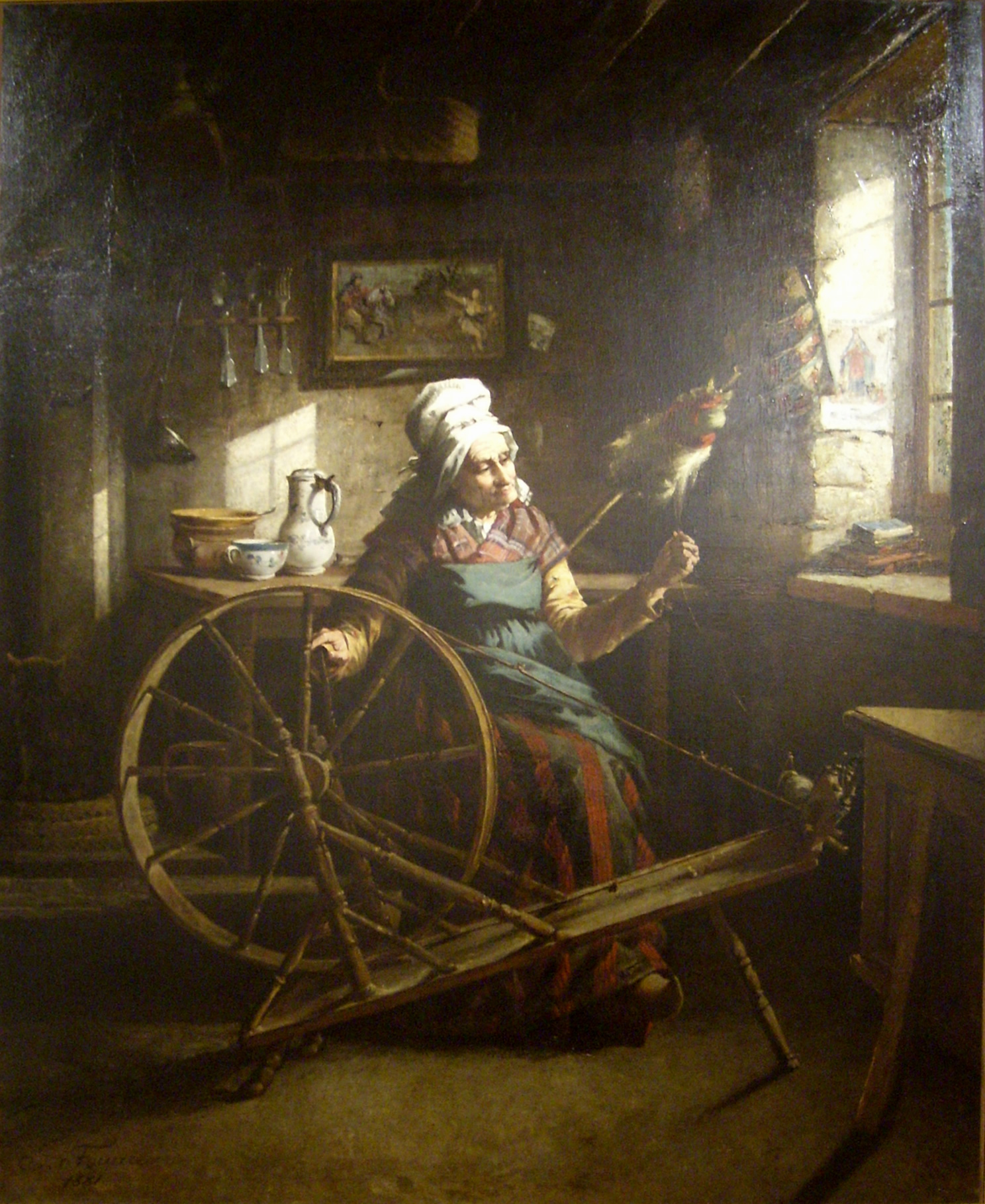
La dernière Fileuse de mon village

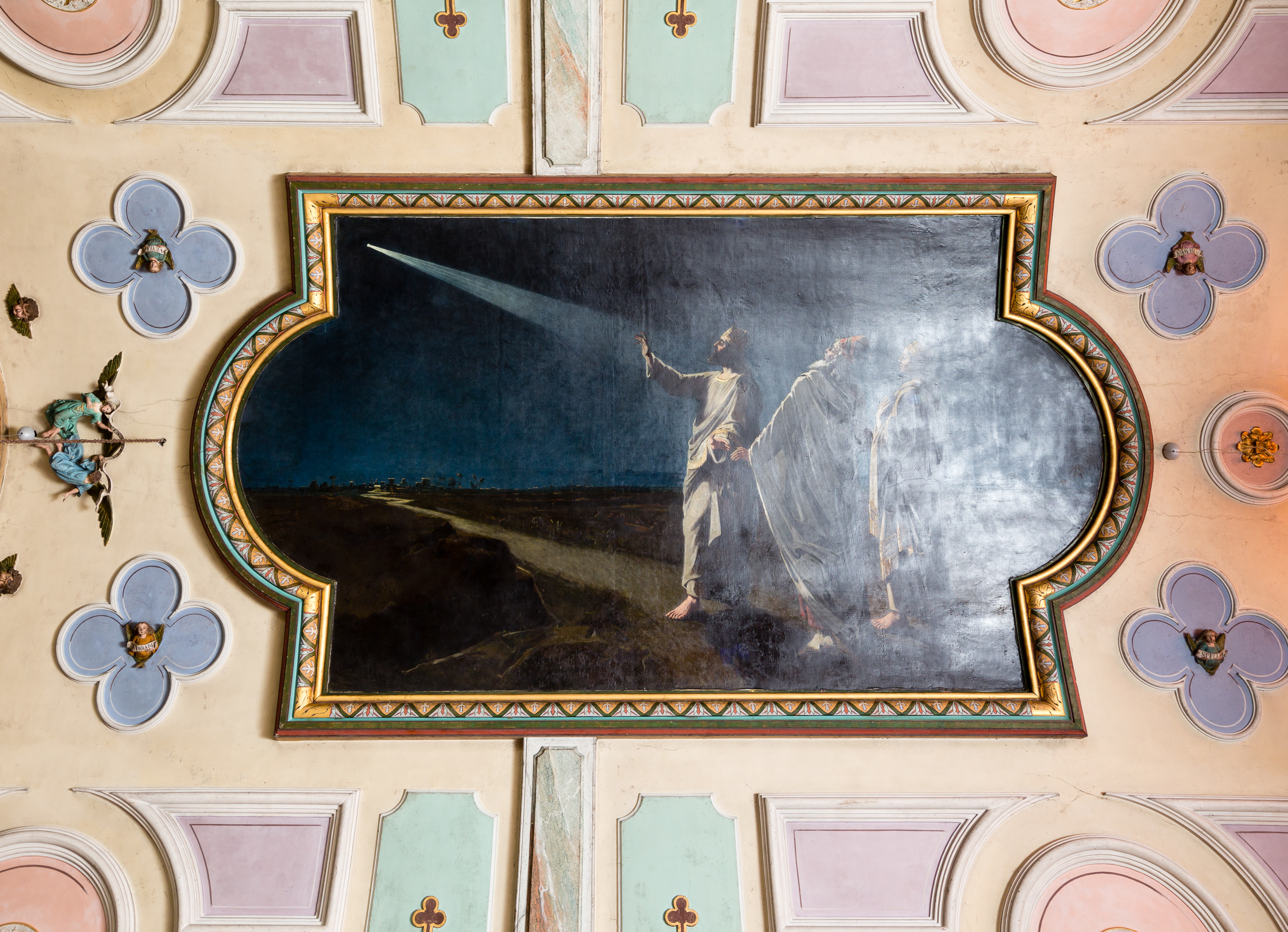
La Marche des Rois Mages

== Bibliography ==
- (in French) Éric Lefèvre. Peintres de Normandie, Orep Éditions, 2007.
- (in French) Maurice Lecoeur "Autour de Guillaume Fouace", Editions Isoète, 2010
