= Armand Le Véel =

French sculptor

Armand Le Véel (1821–1905) was a French statue sculptor. He was a native of Bricquebec, in the département of Manche. Napoléon III inaugurated his equestrian tribute to Napoleon I in Cherbourg in 1858. Many of his works are on exhibition at the Beaux-arts Museum of Bordeaux. He gave up sculpture in 1882, and retired to Cherbourg, where he died in July 1905.

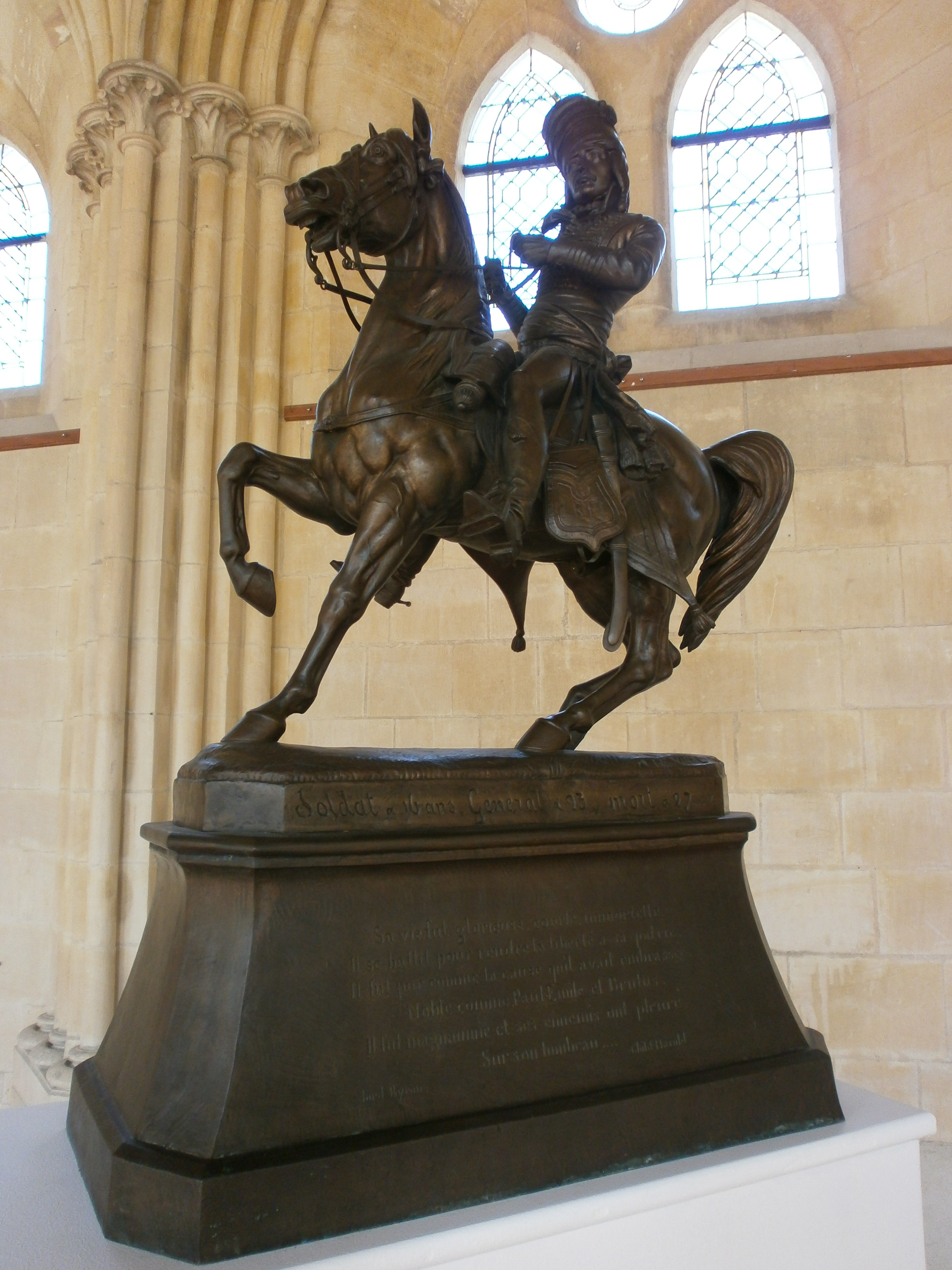
One of Armand Le Véel's works.
