= Gustave Deloye =

French sculptor (1838–1899)

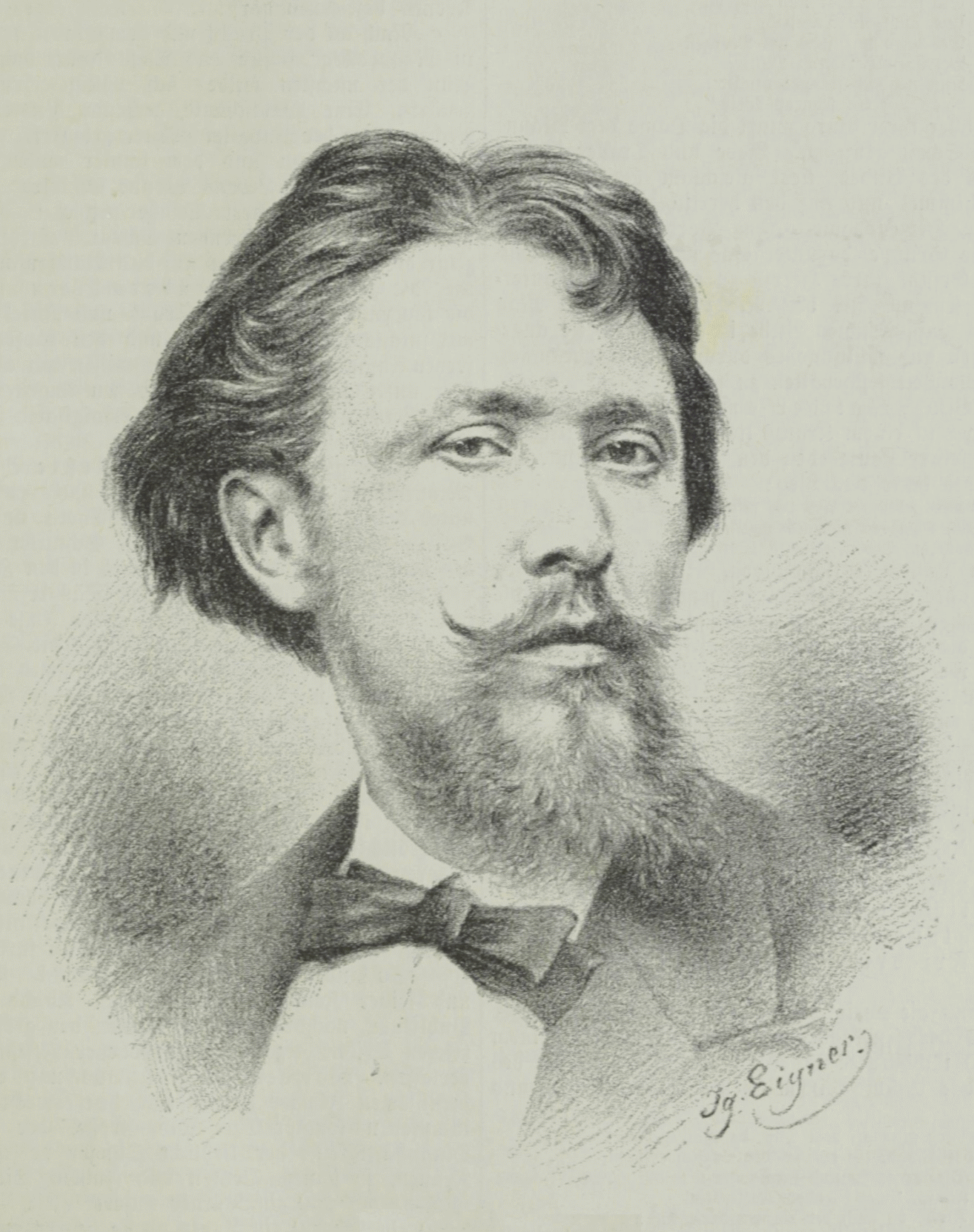
Gustave Deloye, by Ignaz Eigner (1875)

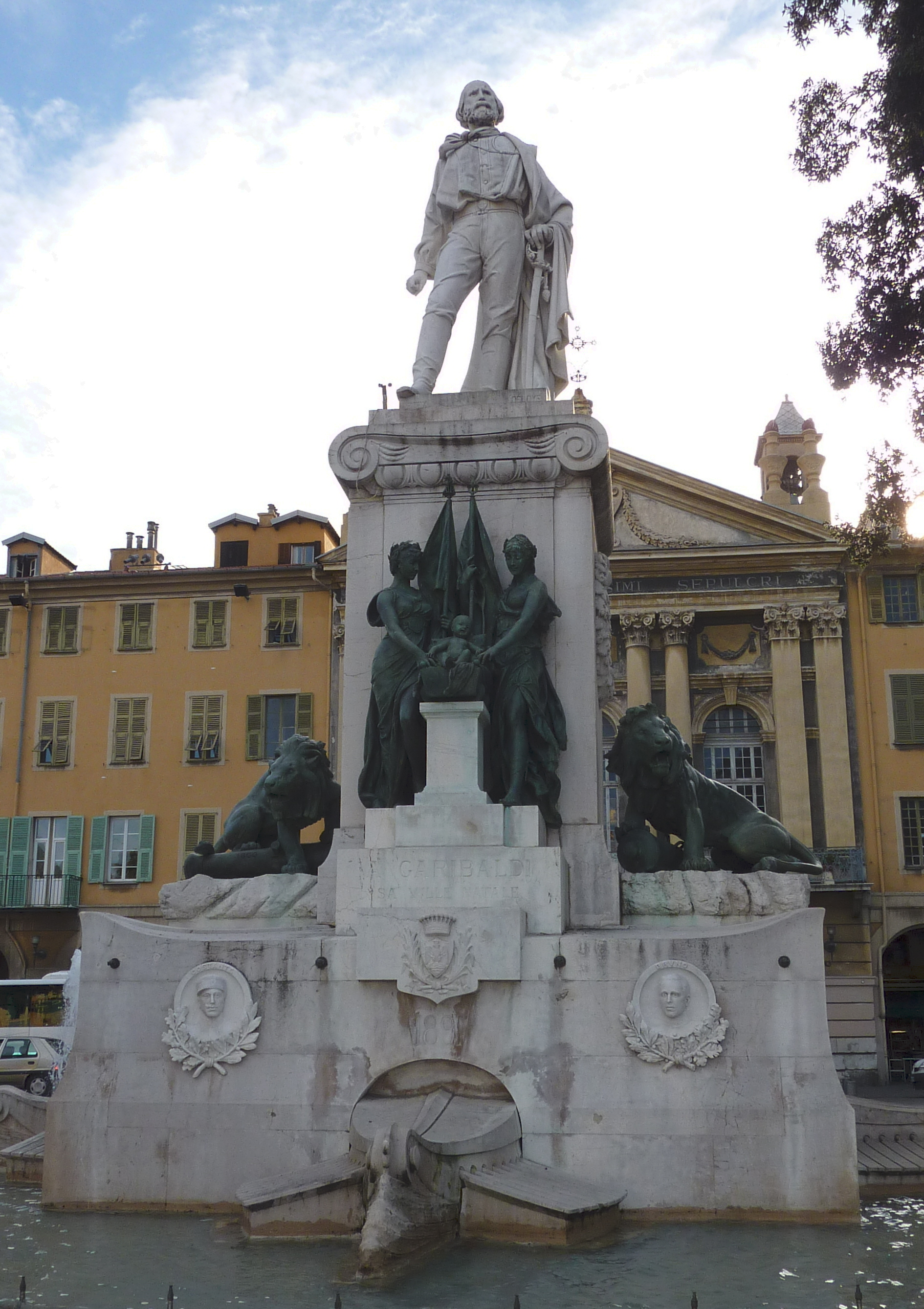
Monument to Garibaldi in Nice

Jean-Baptiste Gustave Deloye (30 April 1838, Sedan – 17 February 1899, Paris) was a French sculptor and medallist in the Neo-Baroque style.

== Biography ==
He was a student of François Jouffroy and Jean-Pierre Dantan at the École des beaux-arts de Paris. In 1862, he was awarded second place for sculpture in the Prix de Rome. He was a frequent exhibitor at the Salon and received several commissions for monuments from the French government.

Among his most outstanding works are the caryatids at the Château de Chenonceaux, the Château de La Boissière and the Château d'Aynac. His best known work is a monument to Giuseppe Garibaldi (1891), commissioned by the city of Nice, done from an original design by Antoine Étex.That same year, he contributed two bas-reliefs for a monument to Juan Santamaría, a national hero of Costa Rica, in Alajuela, created by his friend Aristide Croisy.

In 1892, he was named a Knight in the Legion of Honor. He also created numerous decorative works at public buildings in Vienna, Rome and St. Petersburg and smaller figures for the Meissen Porcelain factory. His statue of Mark the Evangelist on a winged lion is on display at the Musée d'Orsay.

He is buried at L'Étang-la-Ville.
