= List of communes in France with over 20,000 inhabitants =

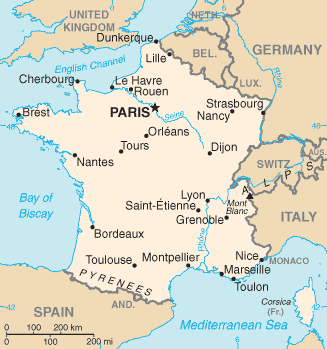
Map of metropolitan France

As of January 2023, there were 482 communes in France (metropolitan territory and overseas departments and regions) with population over 20,000, 287 communes with population over 30,000, 133 communes with population over 50,000 and 42 communes with population over 100,000. All figures reflect the municipal population (French: population municipale), meaning people who have their usual residence in the commune, excluding population counted apart. The population of the matching urban unit is usually several times that of its central commune. Populations as of 2006 and 2013 are also shown. Communes in the overseas and sui generis collectivities are listed in a separate table below.

== List ==
Commune	Department	Region	Population, 2006	Population, 2013	Population, 2023	Rank, 2023
Paris	Paris	Île-de-France	2,181,371	2,229,621	2,103,778	1
Marseille	Bouches-du-Rhône	Provence-Alpes-Côte d'Azur	839,043	855,393	886,040	2
Lyon	Lyon Metropolis	Auvergne-Rhône-Alpes	472,305	500,715	519,127	3
Toulouse	Haute-Garonne	Occitania	437,715	458,298	514,819	4
Nice	Alpes-Maritimes	Provence-Alpes-Côte d'Azur	347,060	342,295	357,737	5
Nantes	Loire-Atlantique	Pays de la Loire	282,853	292,718	327,734	6
Montpellier	Hérault	Occitania	251,634	272,084	310,240	7
Strasbourg	Bas-Rhin	Grand Est	272,975	275,718	293,771	8
Bordeaux	Gironde	Nouvelle-Aquitaine	232,260	243,626	267,991	9
Lille	Nord	Hauts-de-France	226,014	231,491	238,246	10
Rennes	Ille-et-Vilaine	Brittany	209,613	211,373	230,890	11
Toulon	Var	Provence-Alpes-Côte d'Azur	167,816	163,760	179,116	12
Reims	Marne	Grand Est	183,837	182,592	177,674	13
Saint-Étienne	Loire	Auvergne-Rhône-Alpes	177,480	172,023	173,136	14
Le Havre	Seine-Maritime	Normandy	182,580	172,074	166,687	15
Villeurbanne	Lyon Metropolis	Auvergne-Rhône-Alpes	136,473	147,192	163,684	16
Dijon	Côte-d'Or	Bourgogne-Franche-Comté	151,504	153,003	161,830	17
Angers	Maine-et-Loire	Pays de la Loire	152,337	150,125	159,022	18
Grenoble	Isère	Auvergne-Rhône-Alpes	156,107	160,215	156,140	19
Saint-Denis	Réunion	Réunion	138,314	142,442	155,634	20
Nîmes	Gard	Occitania	144,092	150,564	151,839	21
Aix-en-Provence	Bouches-du-Rhône	Provence-Alpes-Côte d'Azur	142,534	141,545	149,695	22
Saint-Denis	Seine-Saint-Denis	Île-de-France	97,875	109,343	149,077	23
Clermont-Ferrand	Puy-de-Dôme	Auvergne-Rhône-Alpes	138,992	141,463	146,351	24
Le Mans	Sarthe	Pays de la Loire	144,016	144,244	146,249	25
Brest	Finistère	Brittany	144,548	139,386	142,346	26
Tours	Indre-et-Loire	Centre-Val de Loire	136,942	134,803	139,259	27
Amiens	Somme	Hauts-de-France	136,105	132,699	136,449	28
Annecy	Haute-Savoie	Auvergne-Rhône-Alpes	51,023	52,029	132,117	29
Limoges	Haute-Vienne	Nouvelle-Aquitaine	136,539	135,098	129,937	30
Metz	Moselle	Grand Est	124,435	118,634	122,572	31
Perpignan	Pyrénées-Orientales	Occitania	115,326	120,959	121,616	32
Boulogne-Billancourt	Hauts-de-Seine	Île-de-France	110,251	116,794	119,019	33
Besançon	Doubs	Bourgogne-Franche-Comté	117,080	116,952	118,489	34
Rouen	Seine-Maritime	Normandy	107,904	110,755	117,662	35
Orléans	Loiret	Centre-Val de Loire	113,130	114,375	116,357	36
Montreuil	Seine-Saint-Denis	Île-de-France	101,587	104,139	111,934	37
Caen	Calvados	Normandy	110,399	107,229	109,400	38
Saint-Paul	Réunion	Réunion	99,291	104,332	108,088	39
Argenteuil	Val-d'Oise	Île-de-France	102,683	106,817	106,130	40
Mulhouse	Haut-Rhin	Grand Est	110,514	112,063	104,978	41
Nancy	Meurthe-et-Moselle	Grand Est	105,468	104,072	103,671	42
Tourcoing	Nord	Hauts-de-France	92,357	93,974	98,772	43
Roubaix	Nord	Hauts-de-France	97,952	95,866	98,286	44
Nanterre	Hauts-de-Seine	Île-de-France	88,316	92,227	97,783	45
Vitry-sur-Seine	Val-de-Marne	Île-de-France	82,902	90,075	93,963	46
Asnières-sur-Seine	Hauts-de-Seine	Île-de-France	82,351	86,020	93,941	47
Créteil	Val-de-Marne	Île-de-France	88,939	89,989	93,397	48
Avignon	Vaucluse	Provence-Alpes-Côte d'Azur	92,454	90,305	92,188	49
Colombes	Hauts-de-Seine	Île-de-France	82,026	84,577	91,053	50
Poitiers	Vienne	Nouvelle-Aquitaine	88,776	87,427	89,916	51
Aubervilliers	Seine-Saint-Denis	Île-de-France	73,506	77,452	88,365	52
Aulnay-sous-Bois	Seine-Saint-Denis	Île-de-France	81,600	82,634	87,599	53
Dunkirk	Nord	Hauts-de-France	69,274	89,882	86,263	54
Saint-Pierre	Réunion	Réunion	74,480	81,415	85,038	55
Versailles	Yvelines	Île-de-France	87,549	85,272	84,095	56
Courbevoie	Hauts-de-Seine	Île-de-France	84,415	85,523	82,902	57
Rueil-Malmaison	Hauts-de-Seine	Île-de-France	77,625	79,762	82,874	58
Le Tampon	Réunion	Réunion	69,849	76,090	82,579	59
Béziers	Hérault	Occitania	72,245	74,811	81,545	60
Pau	Pyrénées-Atlantiques	Nouvelle-Aquitaine	83,903	77,575	80,441	61
La Rochelle	Charente-Maritime	Nouvelle-Aquitaine	77,196	74,344	79,851	62
Cherbourg-en-Cotentin	Manche	Normandy			78,258	63
Mérignac	Gironde	Nouvelle-Aquitaine	65,469	68,386	78,090	64
Champigny-sur-Marne	Val-de-Marne	Île-de-France	74,863	75,961	78,072	65
Antibes	Alpes-Maritimes	Provence-Alpes-Côte d'Azur	75,820	75,456	77,637	66
Saint-Maur-des-Fossés	Val-de-Marne	Île-de-France	75,214	74,133	76,572	67
Ajaccio	Corse-du-Sud	Corsica	66,063	67,507	76,320	68
Fort-de-France	Martinique	Martinique	90,347	84,174	75,506	69
Saint-Nazaire	Loire-Atlantique	Pays de la Loire	68,838	68,513	74,568	70
Cannes	Alpes-Maritimes	Provence-Alpes-Côte d'Azur	70,610	73,325	74,350	71
Noisy-le-Grand	Seine-Saint-Denis	Île-de-France	61,341	62,834	72,978	72
Drancy	Seine-Saint-Denis	Île-de-France	66,063	68,241	72,390	73
Cergy	Val-d'Oise	Île-de-France	56,873	61,708	70,906	74
Levallois-Perret	Hauts-de-Seine	Île-de-France	62,851	65,264	68,092	75
Issy-les-Moulineaux	Hauts-de-Seine	Île-de-France	61,471	65,662	67,669	76
Calais	Pas-de-Calais	Hauts-de-France	74,888	72,520	67,571	77
Pessac	Gironde	Nouvelle-Aquitaine	57,187	60,763	67,339	78
Colmar	Haut-Rhin	Grand Est	65,713	67,956	66,970	79
Évry-Courcouronnes	Essonne	Île-de-France			66,919	80
Vénissieux	Lyon Metropolis	Auvergne-Rhône-Alpes	57,179	61,636	65,502	81
Ivry-sur-Seine	Val-de-Marne	Île-de-France	55,608	58,933	65,064	82
Valence	Drôme	Auvergne-Rhône-Alpes	65,263	61,767	64,458	83
Clichy	Hauts-de-Seine	Île-de-France	57,162	59,255	64,410	84
Quimper	Finistère	Brittany	64,902	63,532	64,385	85
Antony	Hauts-de-Seine	Île-de-France	60,552	61,727	64,263	86
Bourges	Cher	Centre-Val de Loire	70,828	67,189	64,186	87
La Seyne-sur-Mer	Var	Provence-Alpes-Côte d'Azur	56,768	64,523	63,732	88
Montauban	Tarn-et-Garonne	Occitania	53,941	57,921	62,945	89
Villeneuve-d'Ascq	Nord	Hauts-de-France	61,151	62,616	62,868	90
Cayenne	Guyane	French Guiana	58,004	54,709	62,675	91
Le Blanc-Mesnil	Seine-Saint-Denis	Île-de-France	51,109	52,797	62,376	92
Troyes	Aube	Grand Est	61,344	59,671	62,088	93
Pantin	Seine-Saint-Denis	Île-de-France	53,577	53,471	61,929	94
Villejuif	Val-de-Marne	Île-de-France	50,571	57,184	60,183	95
Chambéry	Savoie	Auvergne-Rhône-Alpes	57,543	58,653	59,964	96
Niort	Deux-Sèvres	Nouvelle-Aquitaine	58,066	57,393	59,854	97
Fréjus	Var	Provence-Alpes-Côte d'Azur	51,537	53,039	59,719	98
Neuilly-sur-Seine	Hauts-de-Seine	Île-de-France	61,471	62,346	59,538	99
Sarcelles	Val-d'Oise	Île-de-France	58,654	57,533	59,173	100
Saint-André	Réunion	Réunion	51,817	56,156	58,885	101
Clamart	Hauts-de-Seine	Île-de-France	50,655	52,203	58,576	102
Lorient	Morbihan	Brittany	58,547	57,961	58,329	103
Narbonne	Aude	Occitania	50,776	52,082	57,587	104
Bobigny	Seine-Saint-Denis	Île-de-France	47,806	49,802	56,927	105
Meaux	Seine-et-Marne	Île-de-France	48,842	53,766	56,905	106
Maisons-Alfort	Val-de-Marne	Île-de-France	53,233	54,470	56,799	107
Hyères	Var	Provence-Alpes-Côte d'Azur	55,007	55,713	55,858	108
Vannes	Morbihan	Brittany	53,079	53,032	55,790	109
Beauvais	Oise	Hauts-de-France	55,481	55,252	55,550	110
Saint-Louis	Réunion	Réunion	49,455	52,656	54,941	111
La Roche-sur-Yon	Vendée	Pays de la Loire	50,717	52,732	54,849	112
Chelles	Seine-et-Marne	Île-de-France	48,616	53,569	54,620	113
Corbeil-Essonnes	Essonne	Île-de-France	40,929	47,632	54,471	114
Saint-Laurent-du-Maroni	Guyane	French Guiana	33,707	41,515	54,429	115
Cholet	Maine-et-Loire	Pays de la Loire	54,632	53,890	54,404	116
Bayonne	Pyrénées-Atlantiques	Nouvelle-Aquitaine	44,406	47,492	54,306	117
Fontenay-sous-Bois	Val-de-Marne	Île-de-France	51,727	53,124	53,757	118
Saint-Ouen-sur-Seine	Seine-Saint-Denis	Île-de-France	42,950	47,534	53,615	119
Cagnes-sur-Mer	Alpes-Maritimes	Provence-Alpes-Côte d'Azur	48,313	46,940	53,354	120
Vaulx-en-Velin	Lyon Metropolis	Auvergne-Rhône-Alpes	40,300	44,087	53,069	121
Épinay-sur-Seine	Seine-Saint-Denis	Île-de-France	51,598	54,857	52,833	122
Saint-Quentin	Aisne	Hauts-de-France	56,792	55,698	52,813	123
Sartrouville	Yvelines	Île-de-France	51,600	51,599	52,763	124
Sevran	Seine-Saint-Denis	Île-de-France	51,106	49,465	52,535	125
Arles	Bouches-du-Rhône	Provence-Alpes-Côte d'Azur	51,970	52,566	51,811	126
Massy	Essonne	Île-de-France	40,183	45,902	51,729	127
Albi	Tarn	Occitania	48,712	49,432	51,290	128
Les Abymes	Guadeloupe	Guadeloupe	60,053	57,960	51,055	129
Gennevilliers	Hauts-de-Seine	Île-de-France	43,054	43,219	50,979	130
Saint-Herblain	Loire-Atlantique	Pays de la Loire	43,901	43,784	50,973	131
Grasse	Alpes-Maritimes	Provence-Alpes-Côte d'Azur	48,801	50,916	50,970	132
Bondy	Seine-Saint-Denis	Île-de-France	53,311	52,865	50,595	133
Les Sables-d'Olonne	Vendée	Pays de la Loire	15,596	14,223	49,603	134
Laval	Mayenne	Pays de la Loire	51,233	50,479	49,400	135
Évreux	Eure	Normandy	51,239	49,722	49,360	136
Saint-Priest	Lyon Metropolis	Auvergne-Rhône-Alpes	40,746	42,950	49,229	137
Suresnes	Hauts-de-Seine	Île-de-France	44,197	48,066	48,956	138
Martigues	Bouches-du-Rhône	Provence-Alpes-Côte d'Azur	46,318	47,904	48,298	139
Vincennes	Val-de-Marne	Île-de-France	47,488	49,695	48,193	140
Aubagne	Bouches-du-Rhône	Provence-Alpes-Côte d'Azur	44,682	45,303	47,529	141
Saint-Malo	Ille-et-Vilaine	Brittany	49,661	44,919	47,439	142
Livry-Gargan	Seine-Saint-Denis	Île-de-France	41,556	43,099	47,228	143
Blois	Loir-et-Cher	Centre-Val de Loire	48,487	45,539	47,219	144
Rosny-sous-Bois	Seine-Saint-Denis	Île-de-France	41,174	43,802	47,180	145
La Courneuve	Seine-Saint-Denis	Île-de-France	37,034	40,678	47,167	146
Brive-la-Gaillarde	Corrèze	Nouvelle-Aquitaine	50,009	46,794	47,095	147
Bastia	Haute-Corse	Corsica	43,577	42,254	46,867	148
Talence	Gironde	Nouvelle-Aquitaine	40,920	41,517	46,338	149
Meudon	Hauts-de-Seine	Île-de-France	44,745	45,043	46,334	150
Montrouge	Hauts-de-Seine	Île-de-France	45,178	49,656	46,324	151
Alès	Gard	Occitania	39,943	40,711	46,125	152
Carcassonne	Aude	Occitania	46,639	46,724	46,080	153
Melun	Seine-et-Marne	Île-de-France	37,663	40,066	45,995	154
Choisy-le-Roi	Val-de-Marne	Île-de-France	36,198	42,769	45,946	155
Saint-Germain-en-Laye	Yvelines	Île-de-France	41,312	39,547	45,931	156
Belfort	Territoire de Belfort	Bourgogne-Franche-Comté	50,863	50,196	45,912	157
Charleville-Mézières	Ardennes	Grand Est	51,997	48,991	45,560	158
Alfortville	Val-de-Marne	Île-de-France	42,743	44,818	45,531	159
Noisy-le-Sec	Seine-Saint-Denis	Île-de-France	38,587	41,125	45,510	160
Sète	Hérault	Occitania	43,008	44,270	45,337	161
Chalon-sur-Saône	Saône-et-Loire	Bourgogne-Franche-Comté	46,534	45,166	45,102	162
Bagneux	Hauts-de-Seine	Île-de-France	38,936	38,520	44,572	163
Tarbes	Hautes-Pyrénées	Occitania	45,433	41,062	44,399	164
Saint-Brieuc	Côtes-d'Armor	Brittany	46,437	45,331	44,364	165
Istres	Bouches-du-Rhône	Provence-Alpes-Côte d'Azur	42,090	42,937	44,292	166
Salon-de-Provence	Bouches-du-Rhône	Provence-Alpes-Côte d'Azur	40,147	44,263	44,194	167
Puteaux	Hauts-de-Seine	Île-de-France	42,981	43,891	44,002	168
Caluire-et-Cuire	Lyon Metropolis	Auvergne-Rhône-Alpes	41,418	42,581	43,597	169
Rezé	Loire-Atlantique	Pays de la Loire	37,333	39,568	43,556	170
Mantes-la-Jolie	Yvelines	Île-de-France	41,930	45,052	43,526	171
Valenciennes	Nord	Hauts-de-France	42,426	42,851	43,468	172
Anglet	Pyrénées-Atlantiques	Nouvelle-Aquitaine	37,646	39,184	43,271	173
Bagnolet	Seine-Saint-Denis	Île-de-France	34,069	35,984	43,086	174
Bron	Lyon Metropolis	Auvergne-Rhône-Alpes	38,919	38,746	42,982	175
Châlons-en-Champagne	Marne	Grand Est	46,184	44,899	42,971	176
Châteauroux	Indre	Centre-Val de Loire	47,559	45,209	42,963	177
Arras	Pas-de-Calais	Hauts-de-France	42,015	40,830	42,875	178
Thionville	Moselle	Grand Est	41,127	41,627	42,658	179
Villenave-d'Ornon	Gironde	Nouvelle-Aquitaine	29,958	30,633	42,545	180
Castres	Tarn	Occitania	43,141	41,636	42,505	181
Bourg-en-Bresse	Ain	Auvergne-Rhône-Alpes	40,156	40,490	42,372	182
Gagny	Seine-Saint-Denis	Île-de-France	37,729	39,276	42,313	183
Le Cannet	Alpes-Maritimes	Provence-Alpes-Côte d'Azur	42,531	43,187	41,938	184
Angoulême	Charente	Nouvelle-Aquitaine	42,096	41,970	41,908	185
Garges-lès-Gonesse	Val-d'Oise	Île-de-France	39,672	41,782	41,791	186
Villepinte	Seine-Saint-Denis	Île-de-France	35,592	35,329	41,470	187
Stains	Seine-Saint-Denis	Île-de-France	34,670	36,365	41,388	188
Gap	Hautes-Alpes	Provence-Alpes-Côte d'Azur	37,332	40,255	41,293	189
Poissy	Yvelines	Île-de-France	35,860	37,461	40,983	190
Colomiers	Haute-Garonne	Occitania	32,110	38,302	40,882	191
Wattrelos	Nord	Hauts-de-France	42,852	41,522	40,847	192
Draguignan	Var	Provence-Alpes-Côte d'Azur	37,088	39,174	40,826	193
Compiègne	Oise	Hauts-de-France	42,036	40,430	40,761	194
Montélimar	Drôme	Auvergne-Rhône-Alpes	33,924	36,643	40,595	195
Boulogne-sur-Mer	Pas-de-Calais	Hauts-de-France	44,273	42,537	40,539	196
Douai	Nord	Hauts-de-France	42,766	41,189	40,250	197
Marcq-en-Barœul	Nord	Hauts-de-France	38,939	38,392	40,184	198
Neuilly-sur-Marne	Seine-Saint-Denis	Île-de-France	33,352	34,756	39,800	199
Le Lamentin	Martinique	Martinique	39,847	40,040	39,400	200
Saint-Joseph	Réunion	Réunion	33,509	37,550	39,207	201
Pontault-Combault	Seine-et-Marne	Île-de-France	34,546	37,847	39,096	202
Saint-Benoît	Réunion	Réunion	33,187	36,131	38,604	203
La Ciotat	Bouches-du-Rhône	Provence-Alpes-Côte d'Azur	32,126	34,655	38,477	204
Joué-lès-Tours	Indre-et-Loire	Centre-Val de Loire	36,233	37,703	38,423	205
Tremblay-en-France	Seine-Saint-Denis	Île-de-France	35,340	34,614	38,348	206
Chartres	Eure-et-Loir	Centre-Val de Loire	40,022	38,840	38,324	207
Oullins-Pierre-Bénite	Lyon Metropolis	Auvergne-Rhône-Alpes			38,168	208
Thonon-les-Bains	Haute-Savoie	Auvergne-Rhône-Alpes	31,213	34,610	37,928	209
Franconville	Val-d'Oise	Île-de-France	32,988	33,375	37,754	210
Saint-Martin-d'Hères	Isère	Auvergne-Rhône-Alpes	35,217	38,019	37,695	211
Annemasse	Haute-Savoie	Auvergne-Rhône-Alpes	28,572	34,261	37,628	212
Savigny-sur-Orge	Essonne	Île-de-France	37,259	37,206	37,601	213
Échirolles	Isère	Auvergne-Rhône-Alpes	35,687	35,684	37,491	214
Palaiseau	Essonne	Île-de-France	30,339	31,264	37,471	215
Romainville	Seine-Saint-Denis	Île-de-France	25,199	25,657	37,152	216
Saint-Raphaël	Var	Provence-Alpes-Côte d'Azur	33,804	34,005	37,113	217
Six-Fours-les-Plages	Var	Provence-Alpes-Côte d'Azur	34,325	34,387	37,109	218
Sainte-Marie	Réunion	Réunion	30,596	32,605	37,093	219
Conflans-Sainte-Honorine	Yvelines	Île-de-France	33,671	35,213	36,958	220
Vitrolles	Bouches-du-Rhône	Provence-Alpes-Côte d'Azur	37,190	34,493	36,758	221
Châtillon	Hauts-de-Seine	Île-de-France	32,077	35,964	36,705	222
Meyzieu	Lyon Metropolis	Auvergne-Rhône-Alpes	28,738	31,438	36,687	223
Athis-Mons	Essonne	Île-de-France	30,615	30,094	36,613	224
La Possession	Réunion	Réunion	26,242	31,439	36,568	225
Matoury	Guyane	French Guiana	24,583	30,244	36,512	226
Bezons	Val-d'Oise	Île-de-France	27,652	27,855	36,434	227
Haguenau	Bas-Rhin	Grand Est	34,891	34,419	36,391	228
Creil	Oise	Hauts-de-France	33,479	34,262	36,301	229
Villeneuve-Saint-Georges	Val-de-Marne	Île-de-France	30,450	32,575	36,221	230
Villefranche-sur-Saône	Rhône	Auvergne-Rhône-Alpes	34,188	36,531	36,172	231
Saint-Leu	Réunion	Réunion	28,969	33,154	36,163	232
Châtenay-Malabry	Hauts-de-Seine	Île-de-France	31,873	32,623	35,825	233
Saint-Chamond	Loire	Auvergne-Rhône-Alpes	35,608	35,308	35,646	234
Sainte-Geneviève-des-Bois	Essonne	Île-de-France	34,024	35,868	35,438	235
Roanne	Loire	Auvergne-Rhône-Alpes	36,126	35,507	35,409	236
Le Perreux-sur-Marne	Val-de-Marne	Île-de-France	32,067	33,480	35,260	237
Mâcon	Saône-et-Loire	Bourgogne-Franche-Comté	34,171	33,350	35,177	238
Auxerre	Yonne	Bourgogne-Franche-Comté	37,419	34,869	35,097	239
Schiltigheim	Bas-Rhin	Grand Est	31,239	31,450	34,708	240
Trappes	Yvelines	Île-de-France	29,529	30,979	34,689	241
Les Mureaux	Yvelines	Île-de-France	32,634	31,487	34,632	242
Houilles	Yvelines	Île-de-France	30,835	32,287	33,983	243
Le Port	Réunion	Réunion	38,148	35,881	33,969	244
Marignane	Bouches-du-Rhône	Provence-Alpes-Côte d'Azur	32,921	33,986	33,692	245
Romans-sur-Isère	Drôme	Auvergne-Rhône-Alpes	33,138	33,632	33,464	246
Villiers-sur-Marne	Val-de-Marne	Île-de-France	29,369	28,190	33,162	247
Montluçon	Allier	Auvergne-Rhône-Alpes	39,889	37,839	33,147	248
Nevers	Nièvre	Bourgogne-Franche-Comté	38,496	34,841	33,085	249
Lens	Pas-de-Calais	Hauts-de-France	35,583	31,647	32,920	250
Thiais	Val-de-Marne	Île-de-France	29,315	29,280	32,918	251
Saint-Médard-en-Jalles	Gironde	Nouvelle-Aquitaine	26,934	29,178	32,910	252
Agen	Lot-et-Garonne	Nouvelle-Aquitaine	33,728	34,344	32,801	253
Montigny-le-Bretonneux	Yvelines	Île-de-France	33,968	33,625	32,465	254
Nogent-sur-Marne	Val-de-Marne	Île-de-France	30,632	31,367	32,455	255
Aix-les-Bains	Savoie	Auvergne-Rhône-Alpes	27,375	29,580	32,406	256
Épinal	Vosges	Grand Est	34,014	32,188	32,251	257
Saint-Laurent-du-Var	Alpes-Maritimes	Provence-Alpes-Côte d'Azur	30,076	28,991	32,172	258
Pontoise	Val-d'Oise	Île-de-France	28,674	29,826	31,970	259
Bègles	Gironde	Nouvelle-Aquitaine	24,417	26,104	31,831	260
Plaisir	Yvelines	Île-de-France	31,539	31,342	31,811	261
Herblay-sur-Seine	Val-d'Oise	Île-de-France	25,824	27,378	31,779	262
Vienne	Isère	Auvergne-Rhône-Alpes	30,092	29,325	31,778	263
Carpentras	Vaucluse	Provence-Alpes-Côte d'Azur	27,451	28,422	31,619	264
Mont-de-Marsan	Landes	Nouvelle-Aquitaine	30,230	31,334	31,592	265
Dreux	Eure-et-Loir	Centre-Val de Loire	32,723	31,373	31,543	266
Vigneux-sur-Seine	Essonne	Île-de-France	26,333	31,126	31,466	267
Rillieux-la-Pape	Lyon Metropolis	Auvergne-Rhône-Alpes	29,562	30,645	31,389	268
Goussainville	Val-d'Oise	Île-de-France	30,142	31,212	31,301	269
Ris-Orangis	Essonne	Île-de-France	26,620	27,312	31,189	270
L'Haÿ-les-Roses	Val-de-Marne	Île-de-France	30,428	31,201	31,188	271
Savigny-le-Temple	Seine-et-Marne	Île-de-France	25,130	30,068	31,148	272
Cambrai	Nord	Hauts-de-France	32,594	32,852	31,134	273
Cachan	Val-de-Marne	Île-de-France	27,590	29,462	31,103	274
Châtellerault	Vienne	Nouvelle-Aquitaine	34,402	31,262	31,003	275
Baie-Mahault	Guadeloupe	Guadeloupe	27,906	30,015	30,924	276
Viry-Châtillon	Essonne	Île-de-France	31,252	31,132	30,838	277
Le Chesnay-Rocquencourt	Yvelines	Île-de-France			30,689	278
Menton	Alpes-Maritimes	Provence-Alpes-Côte d'Azur	27,655	28,100	30,604	279
Chatou	Yvelines	Île-de-France	29,472	30,809	30,598	280
Malakoff	Hauts-de-Seine	Île-de-France	30,509	30,304	30,557	281
La Garenne-Colombes	Hauts-de-Seine	Île-de-France	27,188	28,498	30,197	282
Tournefeuille	Haute-Garonne	Occitania	25,444	26,206	30,168	283
Bourgoin-Jallieu	Isère	Auvergne-Rhône-Alpes	23,659	27,163	30,151	284
Draveil	Essonne	Île-de-France	28,736	28,687	30,098	285
Liévin	Pas-de-Calais	Hauts-de-France	32,565	31,517	30,063	286
Villiers-le-Bel	Val-d'Oise	Île-de-France	27,130	27,312	30,053	287
Vandœuvre-lès-Nancy	Meurthe-et-Moselle	Grand Est	31,447	29,836	29,942	288
Agde	Hérault	Occitania	21,293	25,253	29,939	289
Décines-Charpieu	Lyon Metropolis	Auvergne-Rhône-Alpes	24,668	26,826	29,877	290
Saint-Cloud	Hauts-de-Seine	Île-de-France	29,385	29,109	29,855	291
Villemomble	Seine-Saint-Denis	Île-de-France	28,339	29,165	29,795	292
Guyancourt	Yvelines	Île-de-France	28,219	27,546	29,778	293
Orange	Vaucluse	Provence-Alpes-Côte d'Azur	29,859	29,193	29,706	294
Fresnes	Val-de-Marne	Île-de-France	25,575	26,645	29,528	295
Saint-Étienne-du-Rouvray	Seine-Maritime	Normandy	27,815	28,738	29,518	296
Ermont	Val-d'Oise	Île-de-France	28,074	28,021	29,489	297
Clichy-sous-Bois	Seine-Saint-Denis	Île-de-France	29,412	30,725	29,354	298
Vallauris	Alpes-Maritimes	Provence-Alpes-Côte d'Azur	30,610	26,465	29,259	299
Périgueux	Dordogne	Nouvelle-Aquitaine	29,558	30,036	29,055	300
Sotteville-lès-Rouen	Seine-Maritime	Normandy	30,076	28,704	29,003	301
Bois-Colombes	Hauts-de-Seine	Île-de-France	27,151	28,561	28,909	302
Le Plessis-Robinson	Hauts-de-Seine	Île-de-France	23,312	28,500	28,848	303
Charenton-le-Pont	Val-de-Marne	Île-de-France	28,395	30,408	28,830	304
Maubeuge	Nord	Hauts-de-France	32,699	30,567	28,767	305
Montfermeil	Seine-Saint-Denis	Île-de-France	26,121	25,945	28,703	306
Vanves	Hauts-de-Seine	Île-de-France	26,878	28,170	28,622	307
Saint-Sébastien-sur-Loire	Loire-Atlantique	Pays de la Loire	24,508	25,610	28,596	308
Orvault	Loire-Atlantique	Pays de la Loire	24,218	24,922	28,534	309
Dieppe	Seine-Maritime	Normandy	33,618	30,214	28,496	310
Soissons	Aisne	Hauts-de-France	28,442	28,472	28,046	311
Yerres	Essonne	Île-de-France	28,572	28,797	27,906	312
Illkirch-Graffenstaden	Bas-Rhin	Grand Est	26,368	26,455	27,872	313
Sucy-en-Brie	Val-de-Marne	Île-de-France	26,261	25,849	27,764	314
Le Gosier	Guadeloupe	Guadeloupe	27,370	26,900	27,757	315
Rambouillet	Yvelines	Île-de-France	25,661	25,926	27,724	316
Remire-Montjoly	Guyane	French Guiana	17,736	21,638	27,723	317
Gonesse	Val-d'Oise	Île-de-France	26,152	26,075	27,707	318
Blagnac	Haute-Garonne	Occitania	21,199	22,969	27,604	319
Taverny	Val-d'Oise	Île-de-France	26,436	25,998	27,593	320
La Teste-de-Buch	Gironde	Nouvelle-Aquitaine	24,911	25,587	27,566	321
Bussy-Saint-Georges	Seine-et-Marne	Île-de-France	18,772	25,419	27,498	322
Champs-sur-Marne	Seine-et-Marne	Île-de-France	24,499	24,913	27,451	323
Limeil-Brévannes	Val-de-Marne	Île-de-France	18,957	22,816	27,406	324
Cormeilles-en-Parisis	Val-d'Oise	Île-de-France	21,503	23,419	27,292	325
Bergerac	Dordogne	Nouvelle-Aquitaine	27,716	28,063	27,110	326
Sens	Yonne	Bourgogne-Franche-Comté	26,961	25,018	27,106	327
Lambersart	Nord	Hauts-de-France	28,543	28,491	27,090	328
Armentières	Nord	Hauts-de-France	24,836	25,978	26,998	329
Gradignan	Gironde	Nouvelle-Aquitaine	22,988	24,439	26,952	330
Villeparisis	Seine-et-Marne	Île-de-France	23,302	25,889	26,946	331
Sannois	Val-d'Oise	Île-de-France	25,939	26,557	26,924	332
Étampes	Essonne	Île-de-France	22,568	24,502	26,857	333
Grigny	Essonne	Île-de-France	25,981	27,716	26,842	334
Cenon	Gironde	Nouvelle-Aquitaine	23,171	22,882	26,834	335
Brétigny-sur-Orge	Essonne	Île-de-France	22,753	25,624	26,658	336
Lunel	Hérault	Occitania	23,914	25,006	26,623	337
La Garde	Var	Provence-Alpes-Côte d'Azur	25,621	25,298	26,476	338
Élancourt	Yvelines	Île-de-France	27,577	26,290	26,365	339
Saumur	Maine-et-Loire	Pays de la Loire	28,654	27,413	26,241	340
Vertou	Loire-Atlantique	Pays de la Loire	21,091	22,820	26,227	341
Aurillac	Cantal	Auvergne-Rhône-Alpes	29,477	26,572	26,214	342
Eaubonne	Val-d'Oise	Île-de-France	23,640	24,606	26,211	343
Biarritz	Pyrénées-Atlantiques	Nouvelle-Aquitaine	26,690	24,993	26,206	344
Miramas	Bouches-du-Rhône	Provence-Alpes-Côte d'Azur	24,517	25,002	26,203	345
Muret	Haute-Garonne	Occitania	23,622	24,725	26,079	346
Castelnau-le-Lez	Hérault	Occitania	15,229	17,837	26,058	347
Villeneuve-la-Garenne	Hauts-de-Seine	Île-de-France	24,568	25,466	26,021	348
Les Ulis	Essonne	Île-de-France	24,962	24,914	25,886	349
Les Pavillons-sous-Bois	Seine-Saint-Denis	Île-de-France	20,204	22,680	25,804	350
Sèvremoine	Maine-et-Loire	Pays de la Loire			25,797	351
Le Grand-Quevilly	Seine-Maritime	Normandy	26,226	24,967	25,789	352
Lormont	Gironde	Nouvelle-Aquitaine	20,944	20,770	25,769	353
Hénin-Beaumont	Pas-de-Calais	Hauts-de-France	25,915	26,748	25,688	354
Brunoy	Essonne	Île-de-France	25,856	26,066	25,643	355
Cavaillon	Vaucluse	Provence-Alpes-Côte d'Azur	25,819	25,636	25,636	356
Saint-Ouen-l'Aumône	Val-d'Oise	Île-de-France	22,681	23,702	25,578	357
Sainte-Suzanne	Réunion	Réunion	21,714	22,209	25,551	358
Alençon	Orne	Normandy	28,458	26,350	25,490	359
Saintes	Charente-Maritime	Nouvelle-Aquitaine	26,531	25,601	25,363	360
Vernon	Eure	Normandy	24,018	24,064	25,290	361
Béthune	Pas-de-Calais	Hauts-de-France	26,472	25,463	25,224	362
Vichy	Allier	Auvergne-Rhône-Alpes	26,108	25,325	25,115	363
Le Bouscat	Gironde	Nouvelle-Aquitaine	23,411	23,207	25,081	364
Vierzon	Cher	Centre-Val de Loire	28,147	27,113	25,068	365
Libourne	Gironde	Nouvelle-Aquitaine	23,296	23,947	25,036	366
Eysines	Gironde	Nouvelle-Aquitaine	19,279	21,762	24,825	367
Kourou	Guyane	French Guiana	23,813	25,793	24,824	368
Montbéliard	Doubs	Bourgogne-Franche-Comté	26,535	25,697	24,672	369
Petit-Bourg	Guadeloupe	Guadeloupe	21,153	24,039	24,665	370
Orly	Val-de-Marne	Île-de-France	21,197	22,377	24,658	371
Laon	Aisne	Hauts-de-France	26,522	25,219	24,220	372
Frontignan	Hérault	Occitania	22,410	22,942	24,136	373
Le Kremlin-Bicêtre	Val-de-Marne	Île-de-France	25,567	25,863	24,110	374
Couëron	Loire-Atlantique	Pays de la Loire	18,657	20,084	24,103	375
Fontenay-aux-Roses	Hauts-de-Seine	Île-de-France	23,964	22,378	24,070	376
Montgeron	Essonne	Île-de-France	23,105	23,565	24,022	377
Beaupréau-en-Mauges	Maine-et-Loire	Pays de la Loire			23,989	378
Rodez	Aveyron	Occitania	24,028	23,741	23,981	379
Sainte-Anne	Guadeloupe	Guadeloupe	23,073	24,653	23,973	380
Les Lilas	Seine-Saint-Denis	Île-de-France	22,071	22,819	23,843	381
Dole	Jura	Bourgogne-Franche-Comté	24,606	23,312	23,840	382
La Valette-du-Var	Var	Provence-Alpes-Côte d'Azur	22,067	21,463	23,719	383
Dammarie-les-Lys	Seine-et-Marne	Île-de-France	20,838	21,094	23,559	384
Olivet	Loiret	Centre-Val de Loire	21,032	20,677	23,507	385
Hérouville-Saint-Clair	Calvados	Normandy	22,766	21,393	23,470	386
Rochefort	Charente-Maritime	Nouvelle-Aquitaine	26,299	24,761	23,460	387
Combs-la-Ville	Seine-et-Marne	Île-de-France	21,603	22,086	23,350	388
Lanester	Morbihan	Brittany	22,627	21,874	23,263	389
Roissy-en-Brie	Seine-et-Marne	Île-de-France	21,230	22,559	23,229	390
Tassin-la-Demi-Lune	Lyon Metropolis	Auvergne-Rhône-Alpes	18,209	21,102	23,200	391
Saint-Jean-de-Braye	Loiret	Centre-Val de Loire	18,692	19,571	23,147	392
Deuil-la-Barre	Val-d'Oise	Île-de-France	21,230	22,031	23,099	393
Maisons-Laffitte	Yvelines	Île-de-France	22,566	23,565	23,093	394
Le Moule	Guadeloupe	Guadeloupe	21,027	22,456	23,014	395
Vélizy-Villacoublay	Yvelines	Île-de-France	20,030	20,997	23,011	396
Challans	Vendée	Pays de la Loire	17,676	19,501	22,943	397
Saint-Dizier	Haute-Marne	Grand Est	26,972	25,626	22,858	398
Torcy	Seine-et-Marne	Île-de-France	22,299	23,669	22,810	399
Saint-Louis	Haut-Rhin	Grand Est	19,875	19,907	22,805	400
Manosque	Alpes-de-Haute-Provence	Provence-Alpes-Côte d'Azur	21,162	22,412	22,718	401
Loos	Nord	Hauts-de-France	21,410	20,650	22,567	402
Gif-sur-Yvette	Essonne	Île-de-France	21,816	20,631	22,544	403
Les Pennes-Mirabeau	Bouches-du-Rhône	Provence-Alpes-Côte d'Azur	20,231	20,018	22,537	404
Oyonnax	Ain	Auvergne-Rhône-Alpes	23,618	22,258	22,480	405
Montigny-lès-Cormeilles	Val-d'Oise	Île-de-France	18,935	20,307	22,457	406
Auch	Gers	Occitania	21,545	21,962	22,428	407
Abbeville	Somme	Hauts-de-France	24,052	23,821	22,395	408
Villeneuve-sur-Lot	Lot-et-Garonne	Nouvelle-Aquitaine	23,466	23,462	22,350	409
Mantes-la-Ville	Yvelines	Île-de-France	18,506	20,251	22,332	410
Sèvres	Hauts-de-Seine	Île-de-France	23,726	23,404	22,303	411
Montereau-Fault-Yonne	Seine-et-Marne	Île-de-France	16,768	17,173	22,279	412
Achères	Yvelines	Île-de-France	19,850	19,985	22,241	413
Le Petit-Quevilly	Seine-Maritime	Normandy	22,132	22,426	22,208	414
Arcueil	Val-de-Marne	Île-de-France	19,129	19,746	22,200	415
Épernay	Marne	Grand Est	24,456	23,413	22,174	416
Gujan-Mestras	Gironde	Nouvelle-Aquitaine	17,031	20,294	22,153	417
Dax	Landes	Nouvelle-Aquitaine	20,810	20,776	22,109	418
Millau	Aveyron	Occitania	22,133	22,205	22,044	419
Fontaine	Isère	Auvergne-Rhône-Alpes	22,936	22,066	22,020	420
Chemillé-en-Anjou	Maine-et-Loire	Pays de la Loire			21,999	421
Longjumeau	Essonne	Île-de-France	21,048	21,657	21,996	422
Neuilly-Plaisance	Seine-Saint-Denis	Île-de-France	19,952	20,840	21,941	423
Hazebrouck	Nord	Hauts-de-France	21,101	21,737	21,912	424
Nogent-sur-Oise	Oise	Hauts-de-France	19,257	18,753	21,907	425
Voiron	Isère	Auvergne-Rhône-Alpes	20,672	19,988	21,847	426
Fleury-les-Aubrais	Loiret	Centre-Val de Loire	21,418	20,677	21,804	427
La Madeleine	Nord	Hauts-de-France	22,681	22,243	21,790	428
Saint-Michel-sur-Orge	Essonne	Île-de-France	20,041	20,057	21,776	429
Montmorency	Val-d'Oise	Île-de-France	21,416	20,796	21,763	430
Montigny-lès-Metz	Moselle	Grand Est	22,843	21,831	21,718	431
Sainte-Foy-lès-Lyon	Lyon Metropolis	Auvergne-Rhône-Alpes	22,208	21,646	21,692	432
Morsang-sur-Orge	Essonne	Île-de-France	21,717	21,377	21,667	433
Mandelieu-la-Napoule	Alpes-Maritimes	Provence-Alpes-Côte d'Azur	20,850	22,864	21,640	434
Gardanne	Bouches-du-Rhône	Provence-Alpes-Côte d'Azur	21,062	19,844	21,597	435
Le Robert	Martinique	Martinique	23,856	23,296	21,553	436
Lagny-sur-Marne	Seine-et-Marne	Île-de-France	20,086	20,718	21,461	437
Allauch	Bouches-du-Rhône	Provence-Alpes-Côte d'Azur	19,057	21,276	21,443	438
Bruay-la-Buissière	Pas-de-Calais	Hauts-de-France	23,813	22,802	21,424	439
Givors	Lyon Metropolis	Auvergne-Rhône-Alpes	18,454	19,574	21,379	440
Saint-Gratien	Val-d'Oise	Île-de-France	21,436	20,933	21,336	441
Saint-Cyr-l'École	Yvelines	Île-de-France	15,778	18,089	21,268	442
Ozoir-la-Ferrière	Seine-et-Marne	Île-de-France	20,152	19,917	21,238	443
Saint-Genis-Laval	Lyon Metropolis	Auvergne-Rhône-Alpes	19,944	20,696	21,212	444
Montaigu-Vendée	Vendée	Pays de la Loire			21,134	445
Le Plessis-Trévise	Val-de-Marne	Île-de-France	17,710	19,157	21,112	446
Mons-en-Barœul	Nord	Hauts-de-France	22,360	21,513	21,105	447
Plaisance-du-Touch	Haute-Garonne	Occitania	15,265	17,126	21,079	448
Saint-Mandé	Val-de-Marne	Île-de-France	22,211	22,398	21,071	449
Bourg-la-Reine	Hauts-de-Seine	Île-de-France	19,521	19,712	21,019	450
Villeneuve-le-Roi	Val-de-Marne	Île-de-France	18,531	20,481	21,000	451
Carquefou	Loire-Atlantique	Pays de la Loire	17,898	18,646	20,921	452
Sceaux	Hauts-de-Seine	Île-de-France	19,413	19,718	20,884	453
Concarneau	Finistère	Brittany	19,953	18,867	20,845	454
Chaumont	Haute-Marne	Grand Est	24,357	22,560	20,827	455
Lingolsheim	Bas-Rhin	Grand Est	16,784	17,450	20,826	456
Carrières-sous-Poissy	Yvelines	Île-de-France	13,968	15,102	20,825	457
Coudekerque-Branche	Nord	Hauts-de-France	22,994	22,015	20,787	458
Wasquehal	Nord	Hauts-de-France	18,936	20,990	20,726	459
Halluin	Nord	Hauts-de-France	19,879	20,915	20,715	460
La Chapelle-sur-Erdre	Loire-Atlantique	Pays de la Loire	16,660	18,412	20,690	461
Denain	Nord	Hauts-de-France	20,339	20,549	20,665	462
Cugnaux	Haute-Garonne	Occitania	16,019	16,638	20,662	463
Maurepas	Yvelines	Île-de-France	18,705	18,827	20,629	464
Chaville	Hauts-de-Seine	Île-de-France	18,581	19,717	20,594	465
Croix	Nord	Hauts-de-France	20,926	21,114	20,566	466
Bouguenais	Loire-Atlantique	Pays de la Loire	16,503	18,662	20,530	467
Joinville-le-Pont	Val-de-Marne	Île-de-France	17,177	18,124	20,525	468
Le Creusot	Saône-et-Loire	Bourgogne-Franche-Comté	23,813	22,308	20,509	469
Forbach	Moselle	Grand Est	21,956	21,596	20,493	470
La Celle-Saint-Cloud	Yvelines	Île-de-France	21,202	21,264	20,460	471
Mitry-Mory	Seine-et-Marne	Île-de-France	17,903	19,267	20,456	472
Chilly-Mazarin	Essonne	Île-de-France	18,639	19,502	20,443	473
Beaune	Côte-d'Or	Bourgogne-Franche-Comté	21,778	21,838	20,352	474
Lannion	Côtes-d'Armor	Brittany	19,459	19,627	20,315	475
Fougères	Ille-et-Vilaine	Brittany	20,941	20,170	20,307	476
L'Isle-sur-la-Sorgue	Vaucluse	Provence-Alpes-Côte d'Azur	18,015	18,955	20,244	477
Grande-Synthe	Nord	Hauts-de-France	21,408	21,364	20,239	478
Mont-Saint-Aignan	Seine-Maritime	Normandy	20,659	19,178	20,165	479
Sarreguemines	Moselle	Grand Est	21,733	21,572	20,143	480
Cahors	Lot	Occitania	20,062	19,616	20,050	481
Bruges	Gironde	Nouvelle-Aquitaine	12,955	16,954	20,020	482

== Overseas and sui generis collectivities, and Mayotte ==
For the overseas and sui generis collectivities the legal populations sources are:

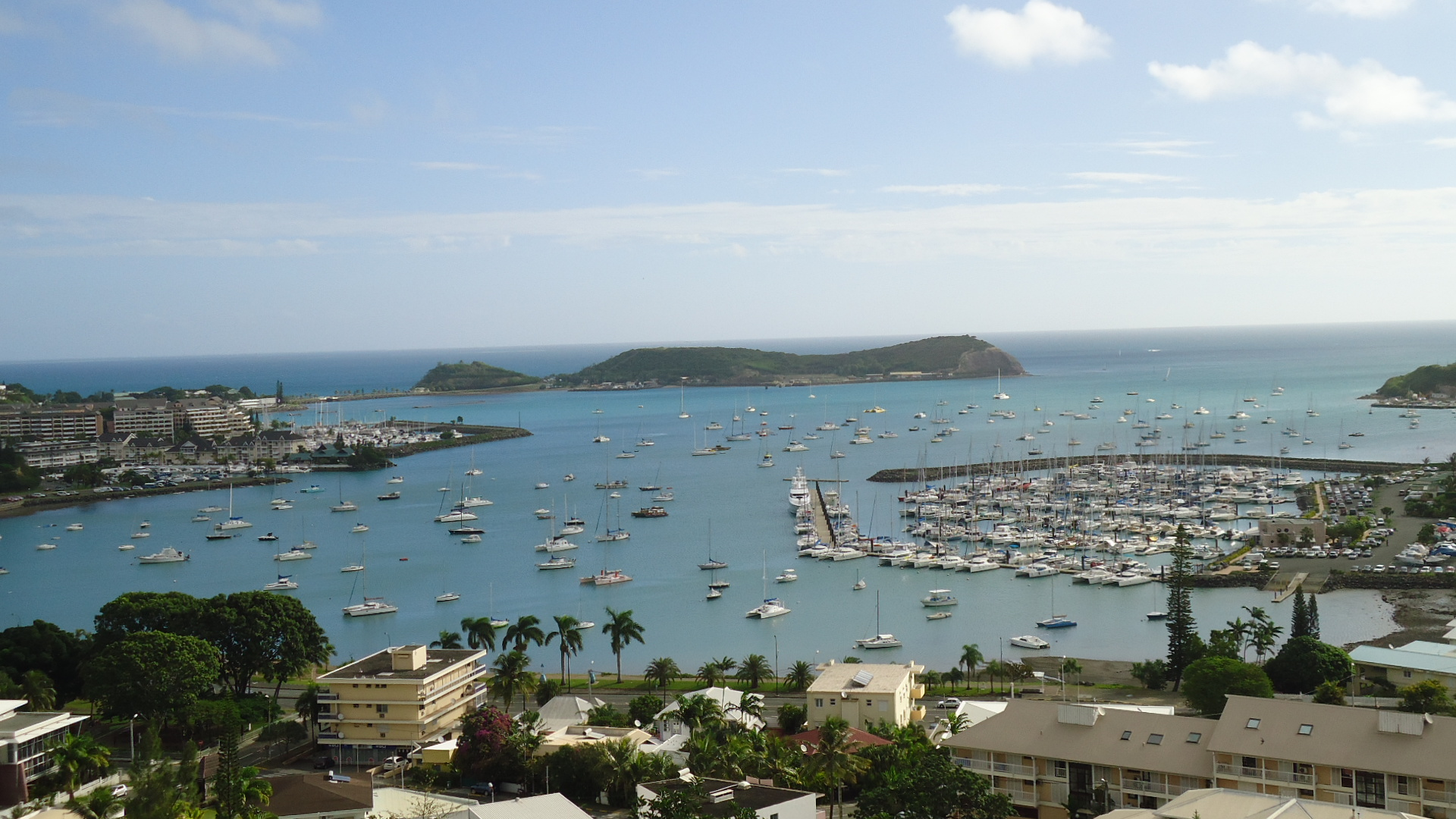
Nouméa

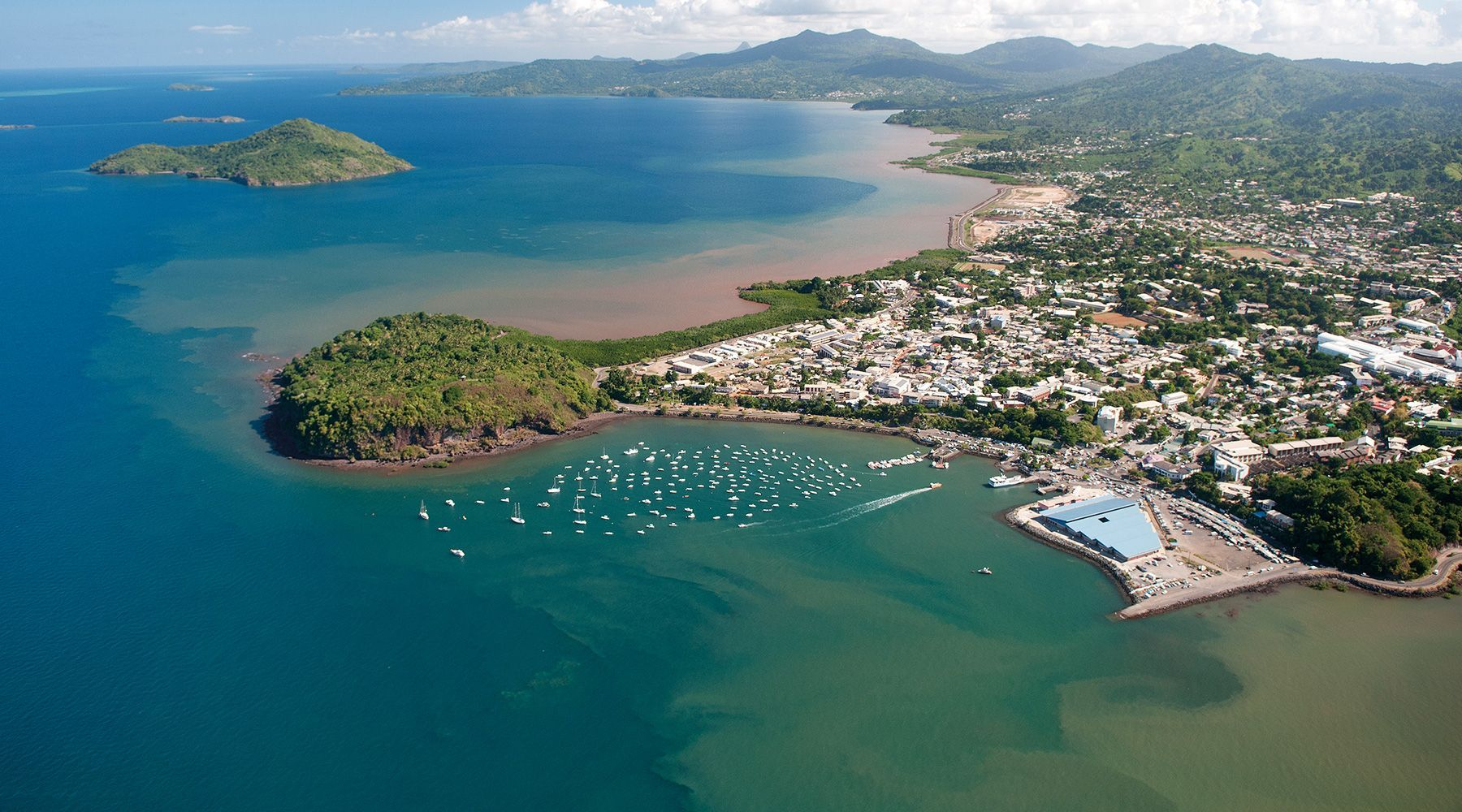
Mamoudzou

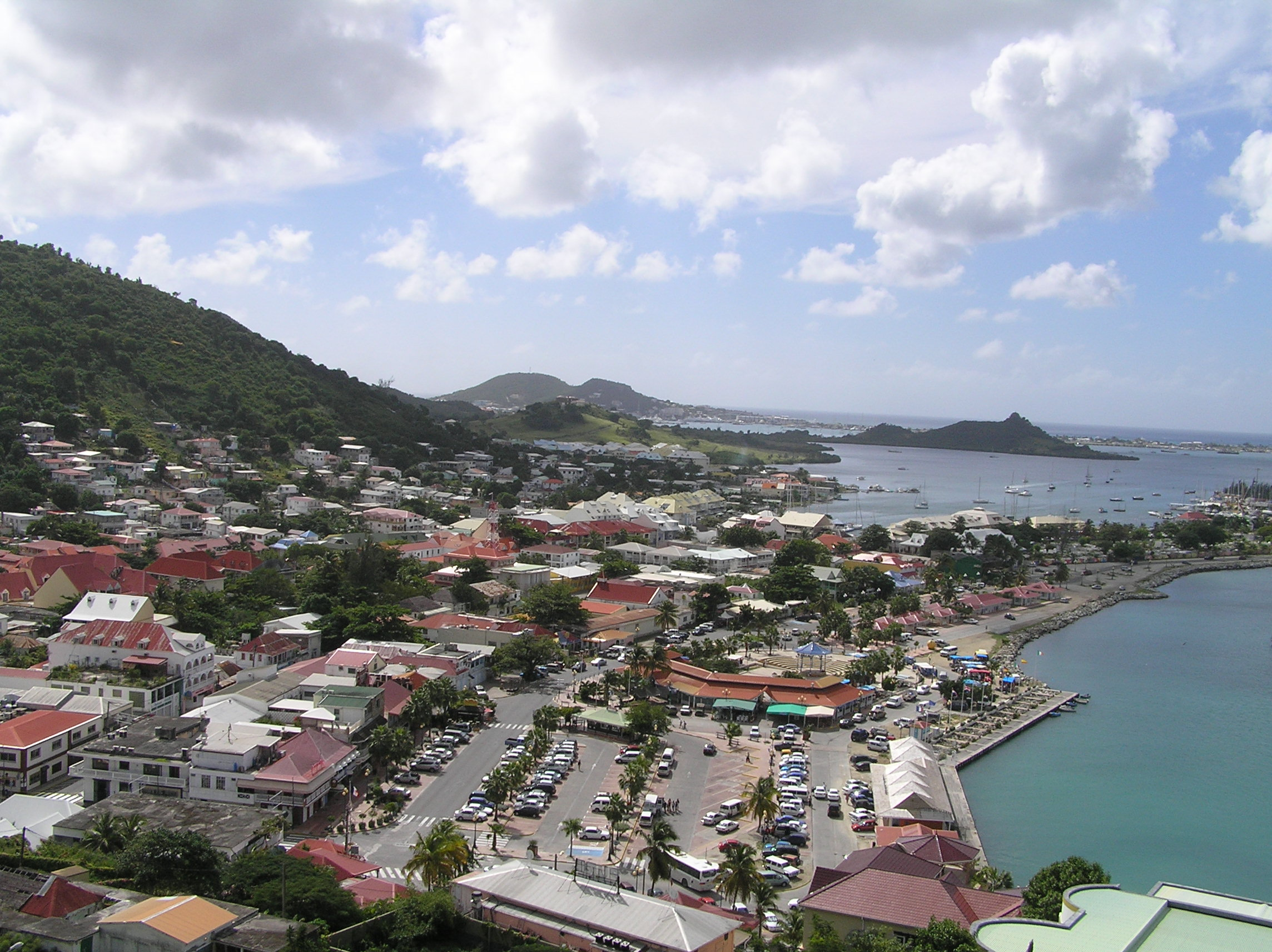
Saint-Martin

- Mayotte: 2017 census
- Saint-Pierre-et-Miquelon: 2023 census
- Saint-Barthélemy: 2023 census
- Saint-Martin: 2023 census
- French Polynesia: 2022 census
- Wallis and Futuna: 2023 census
- New Caledonia: 2019 census

Commune	Overseas and sui generis collectivities	Pop. 2017–2023	Rank
Nouméa	New Caledonia	94,285	1
Mamoudzou	Mayotte	71,437	2
Dumbéa	New Caledonia	35,873	3
Koungou	Mayotte	32,156	4
Saint-Martin	Collectivity of Saint Martin	31,160	5
Faʻaʻā	French Polynesia	29,826	6
Punaʻauia	French Polynesia	28,781	7
Le Mont-Dore	New Caledonia	27,620	8
Papeete	French Polynesia	26,654	9
Païta	New Caledonia	24,563	10

== Images ==
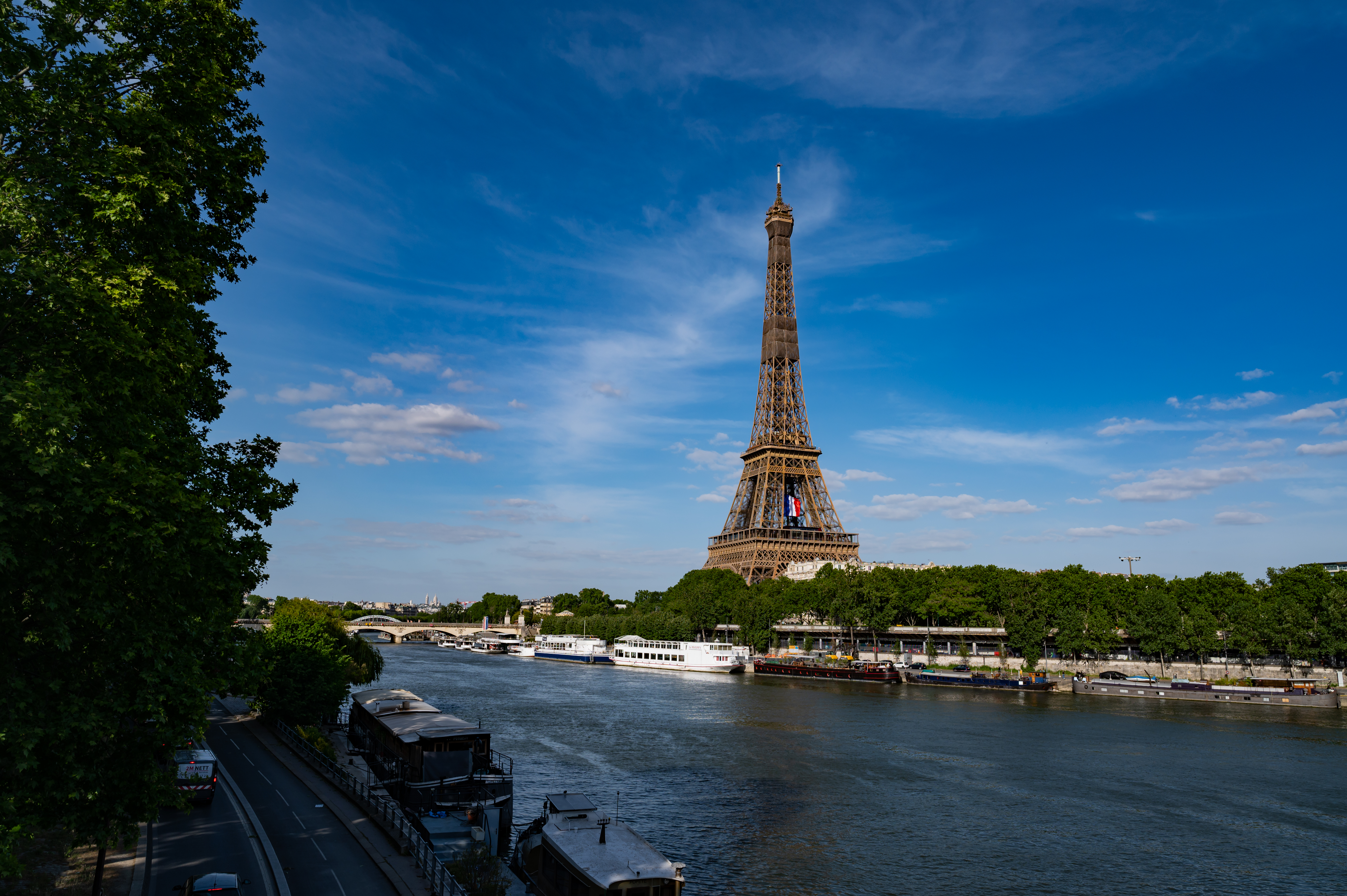
Paris

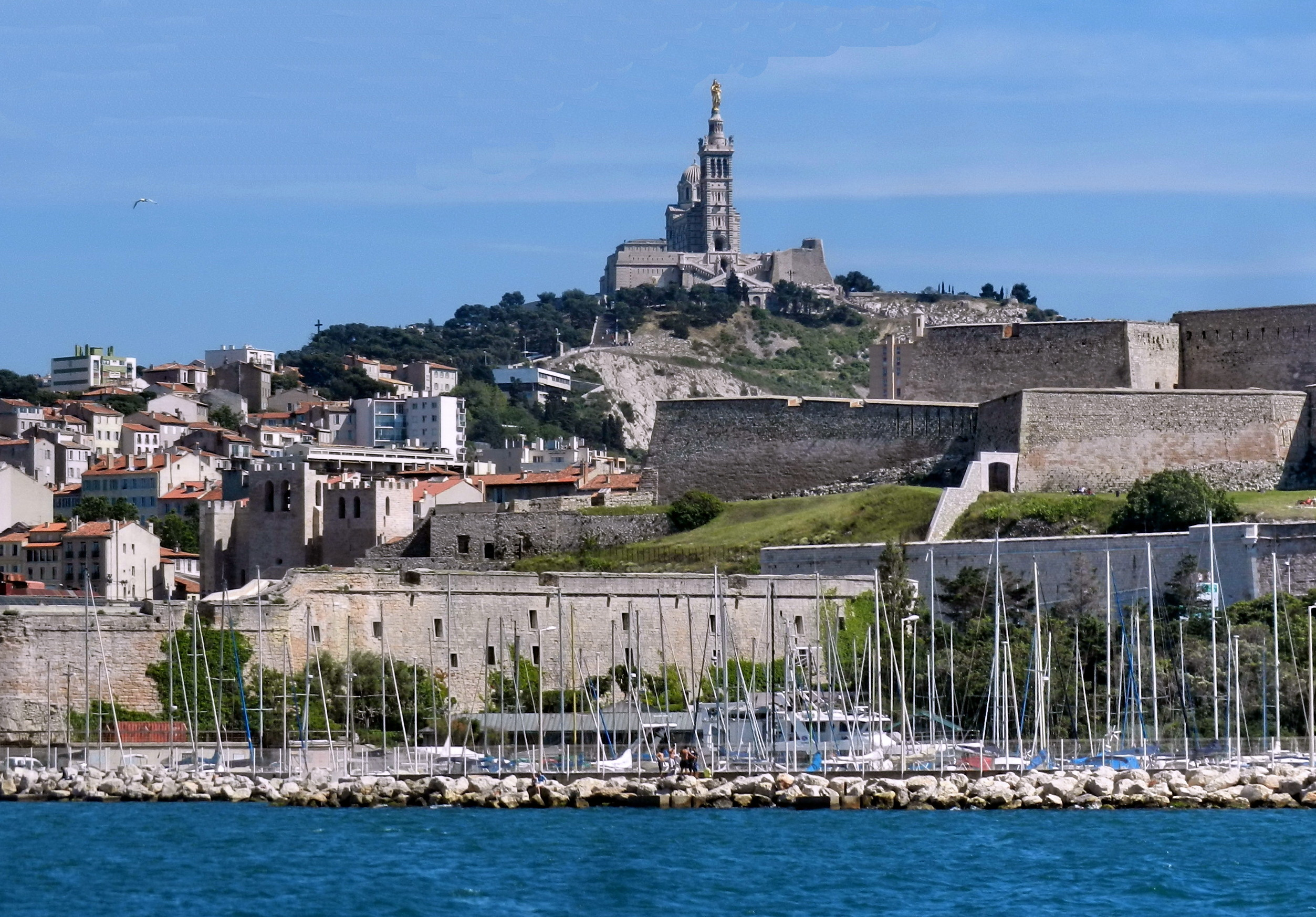
Marseille

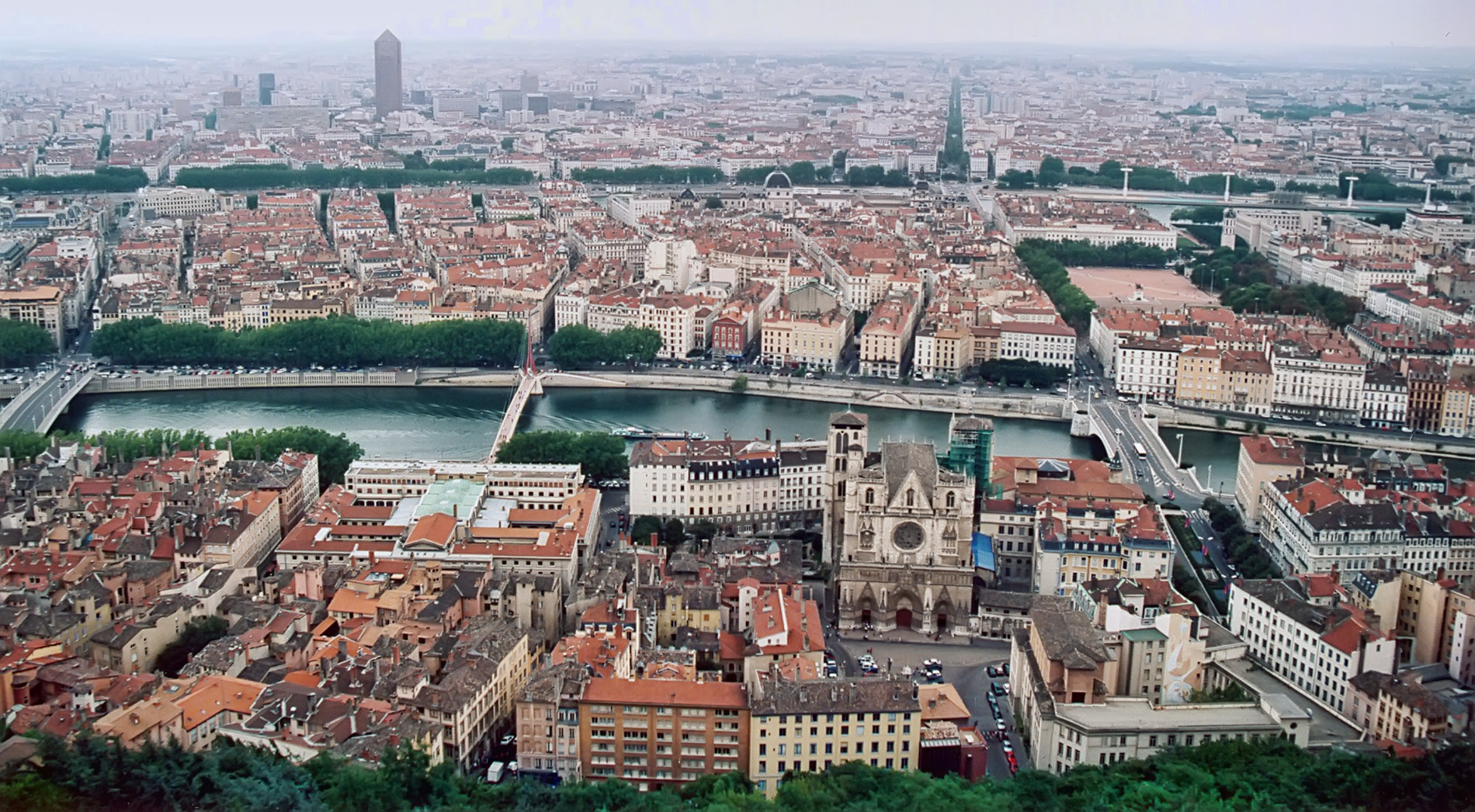
Lyon

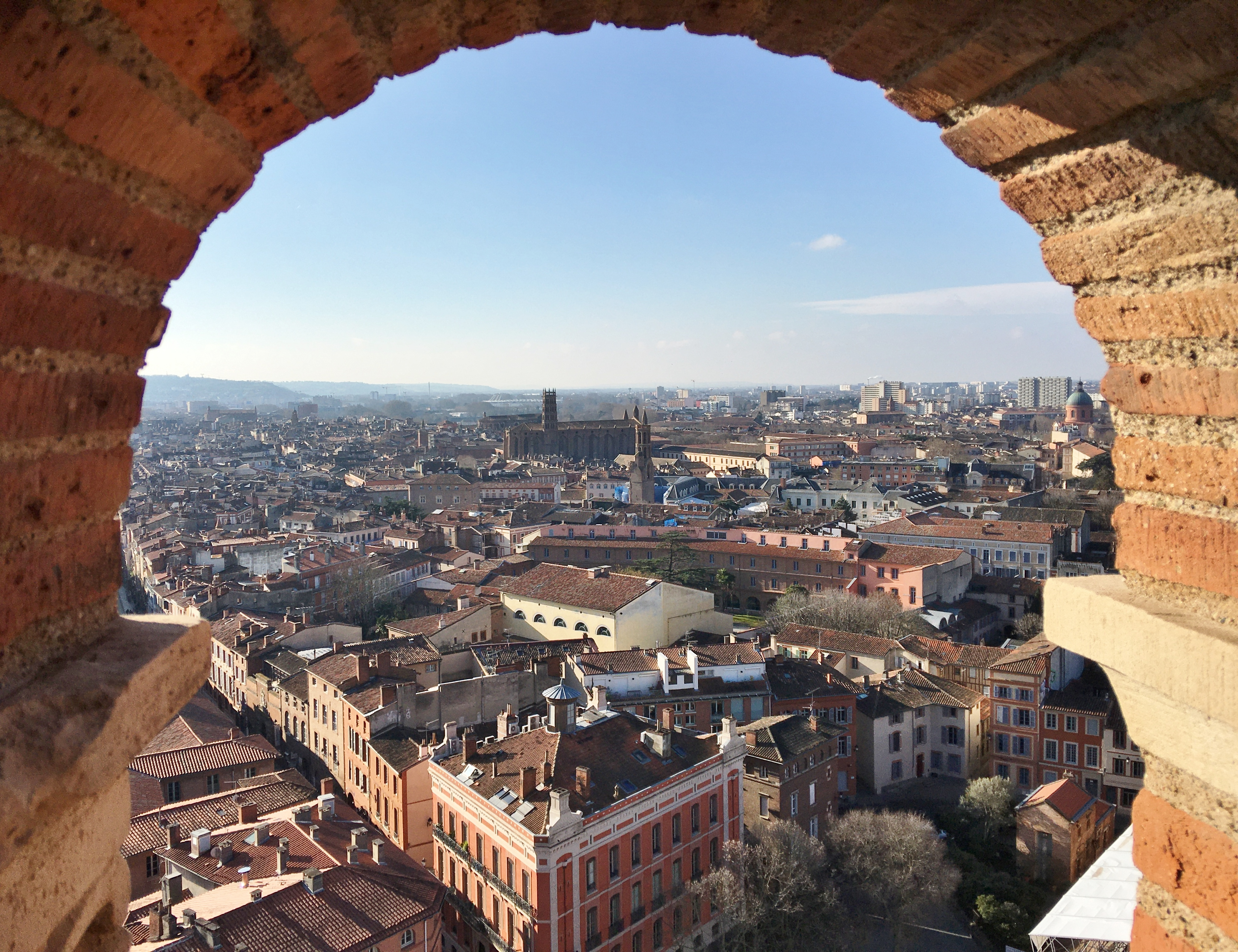
Toulouse

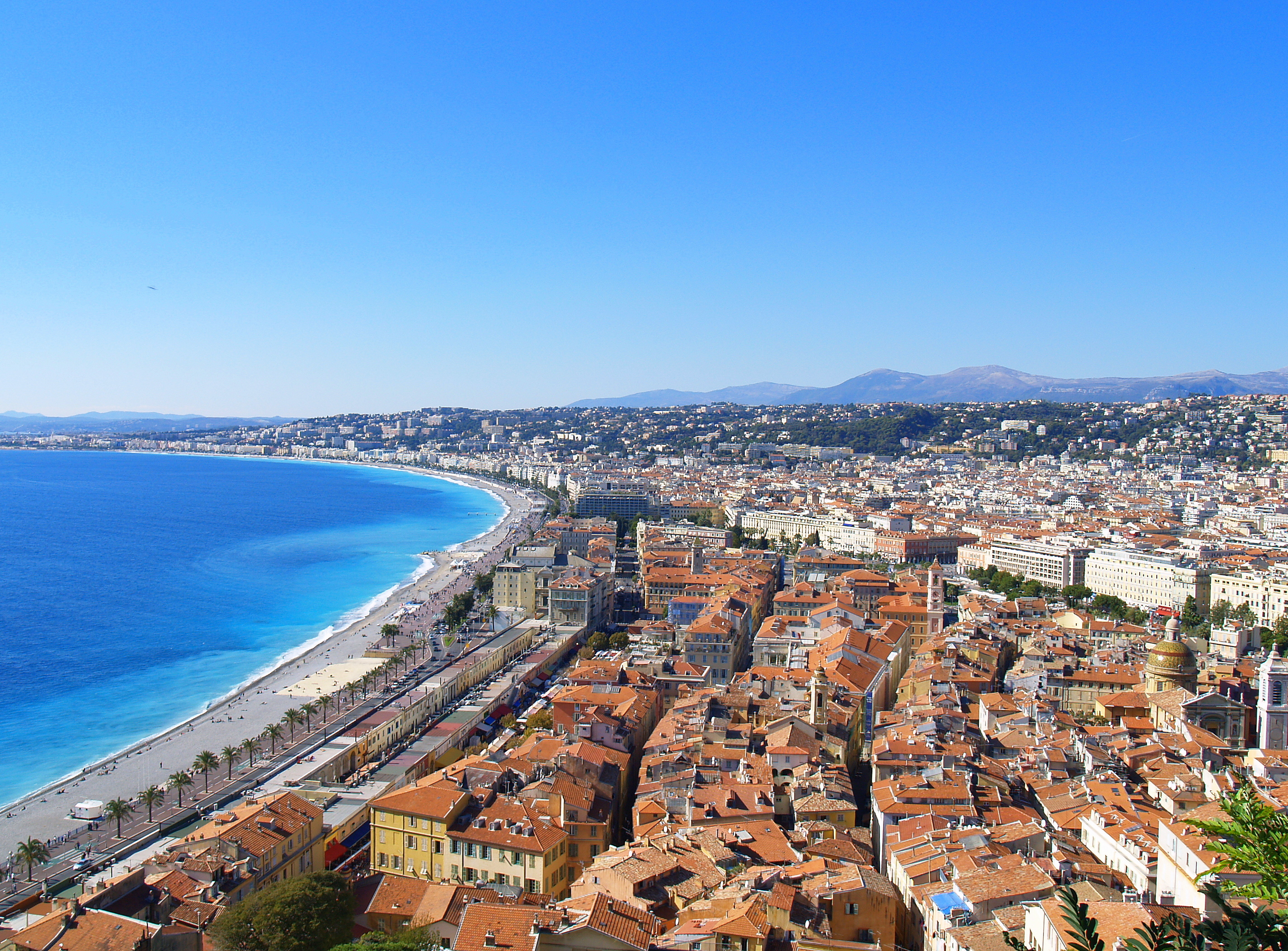
Nice

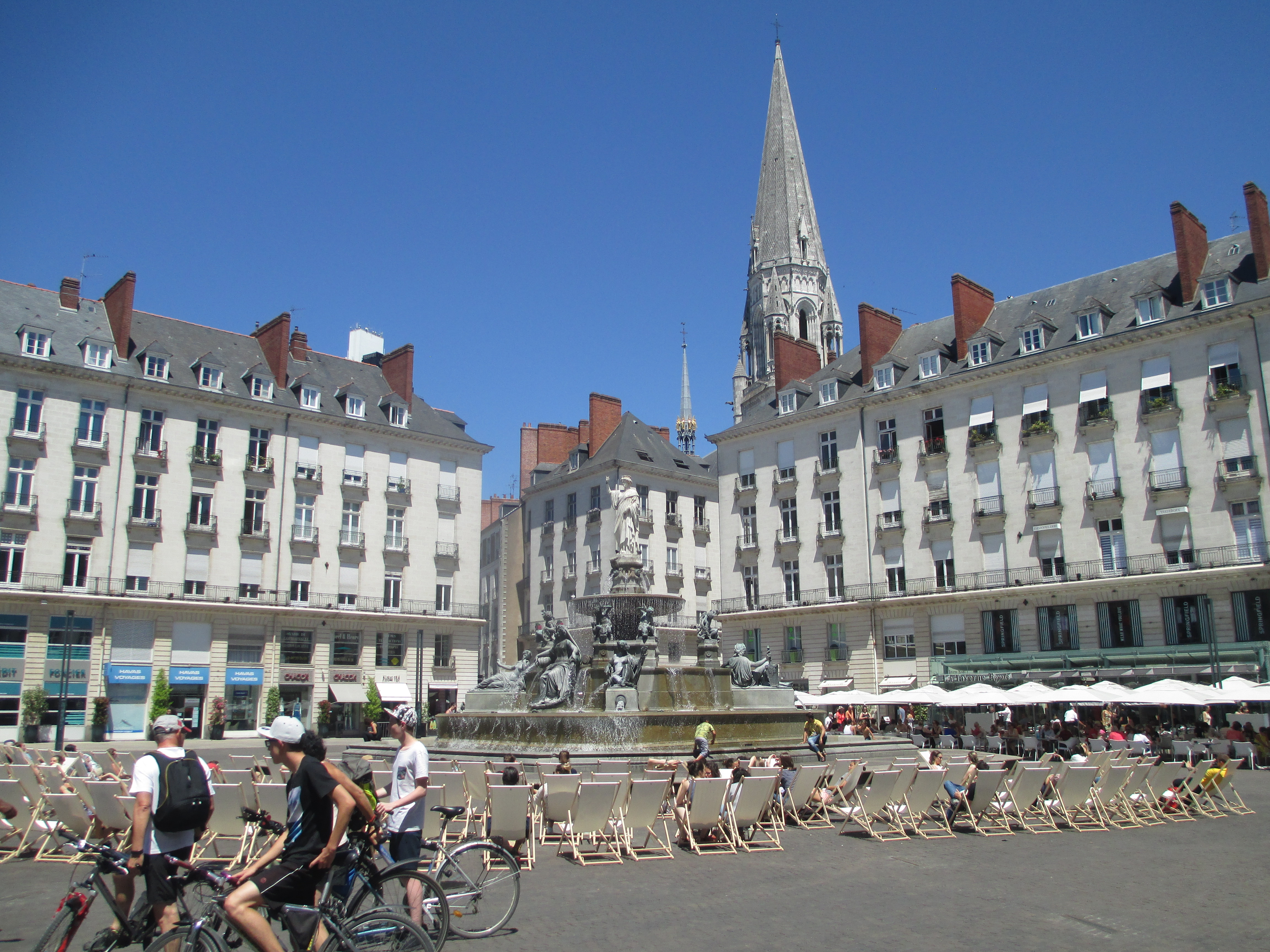
Nantes

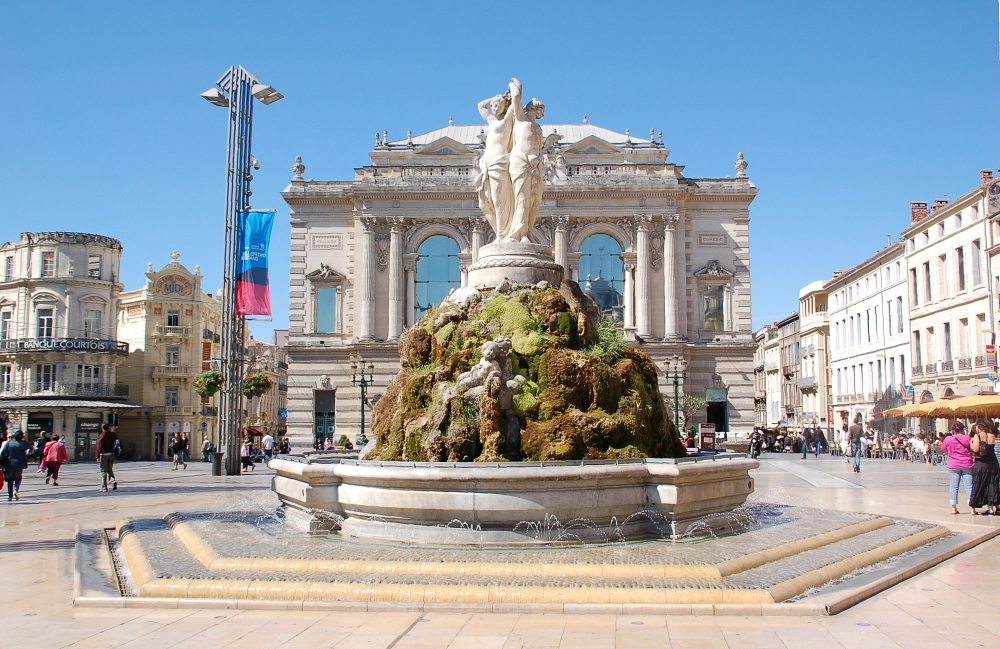
Montpellier

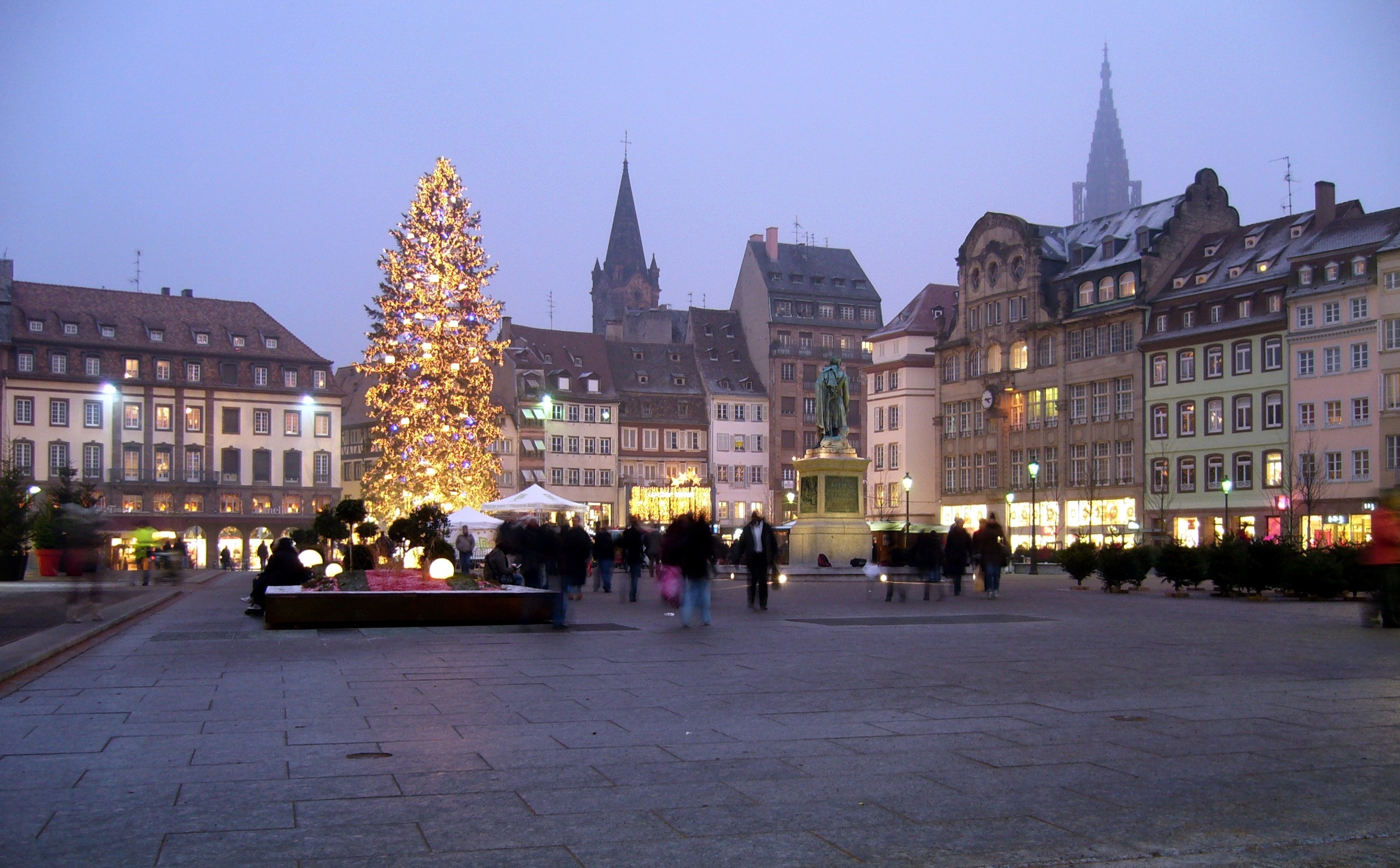
Strasbourg

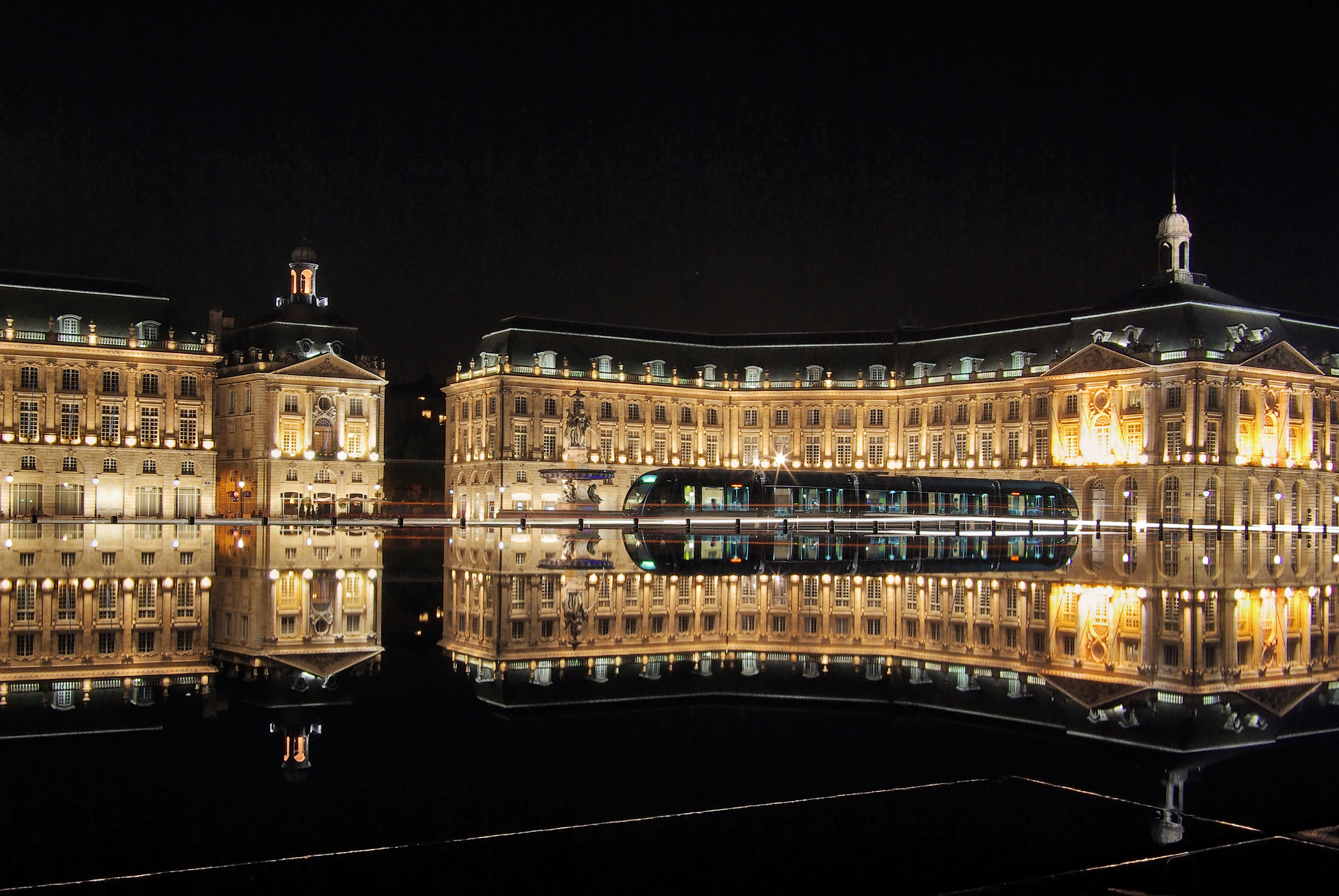
Bordeaux

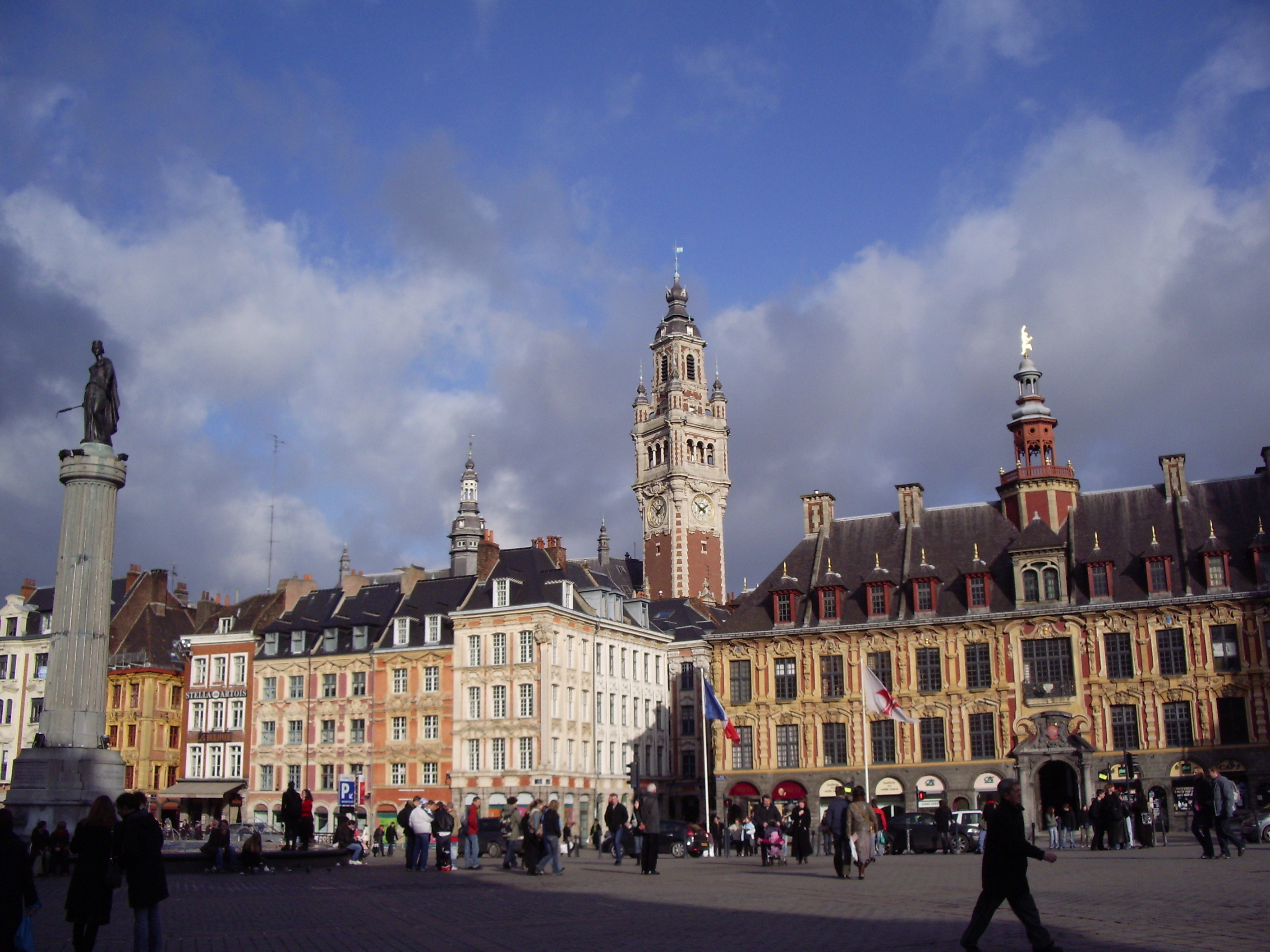
Lille

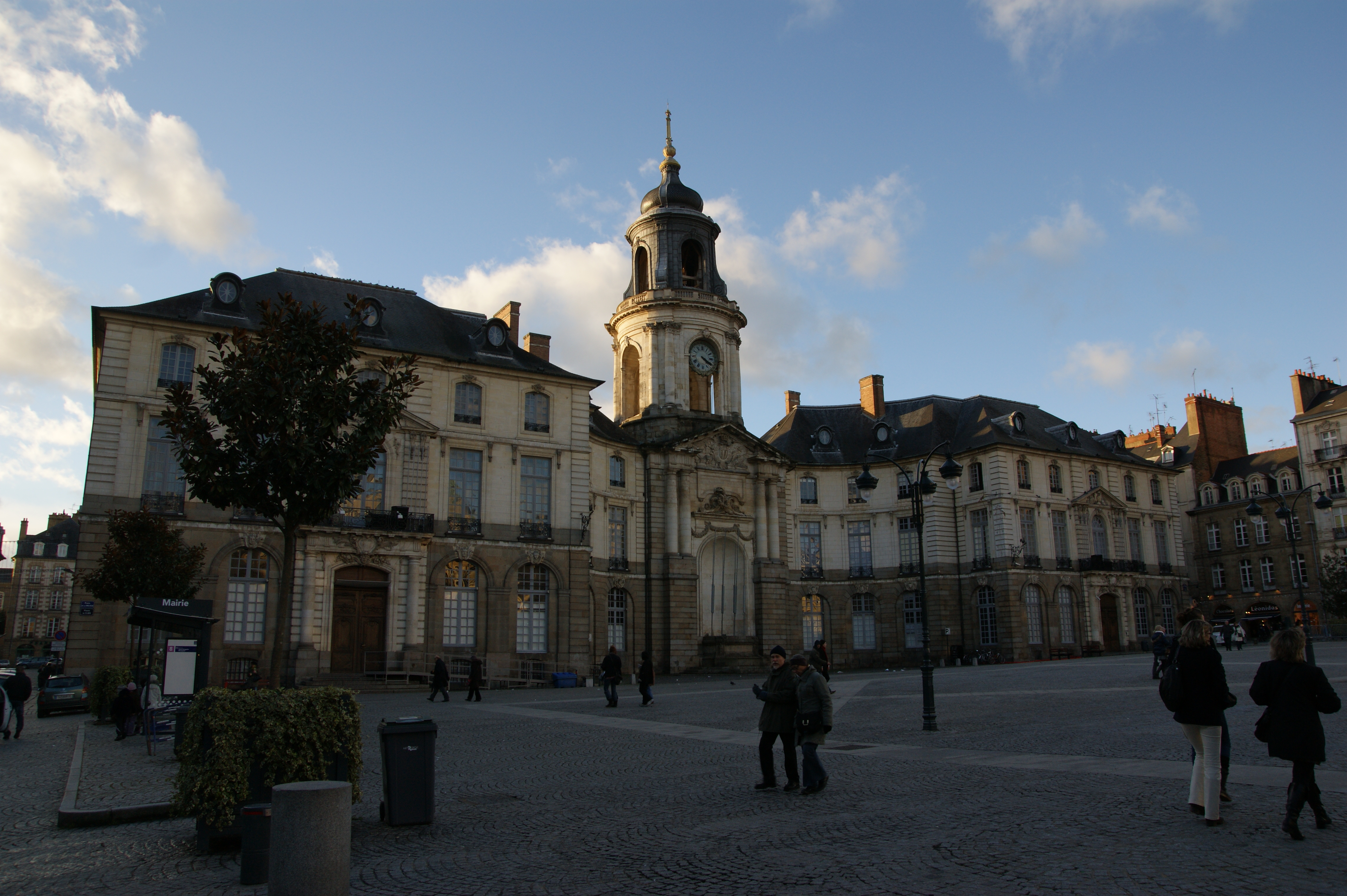
Rennes

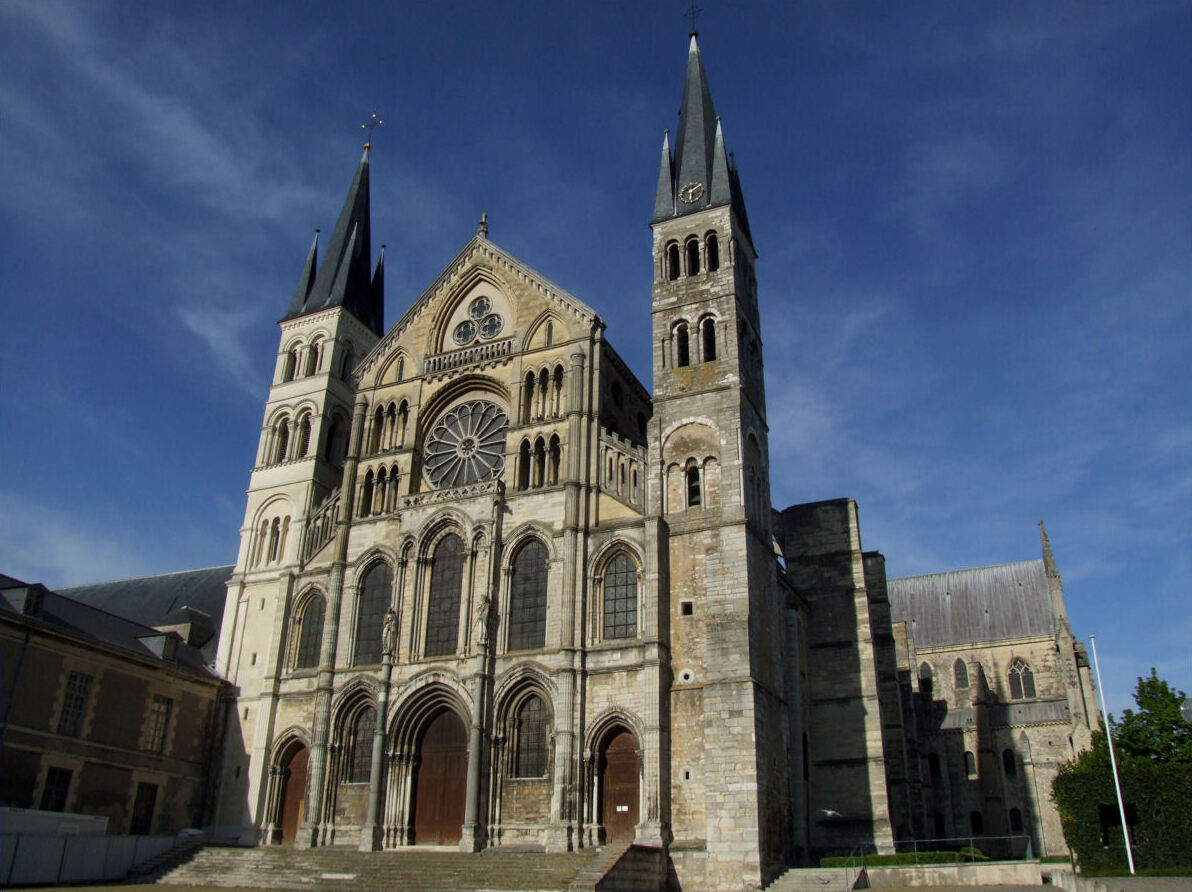
Reims

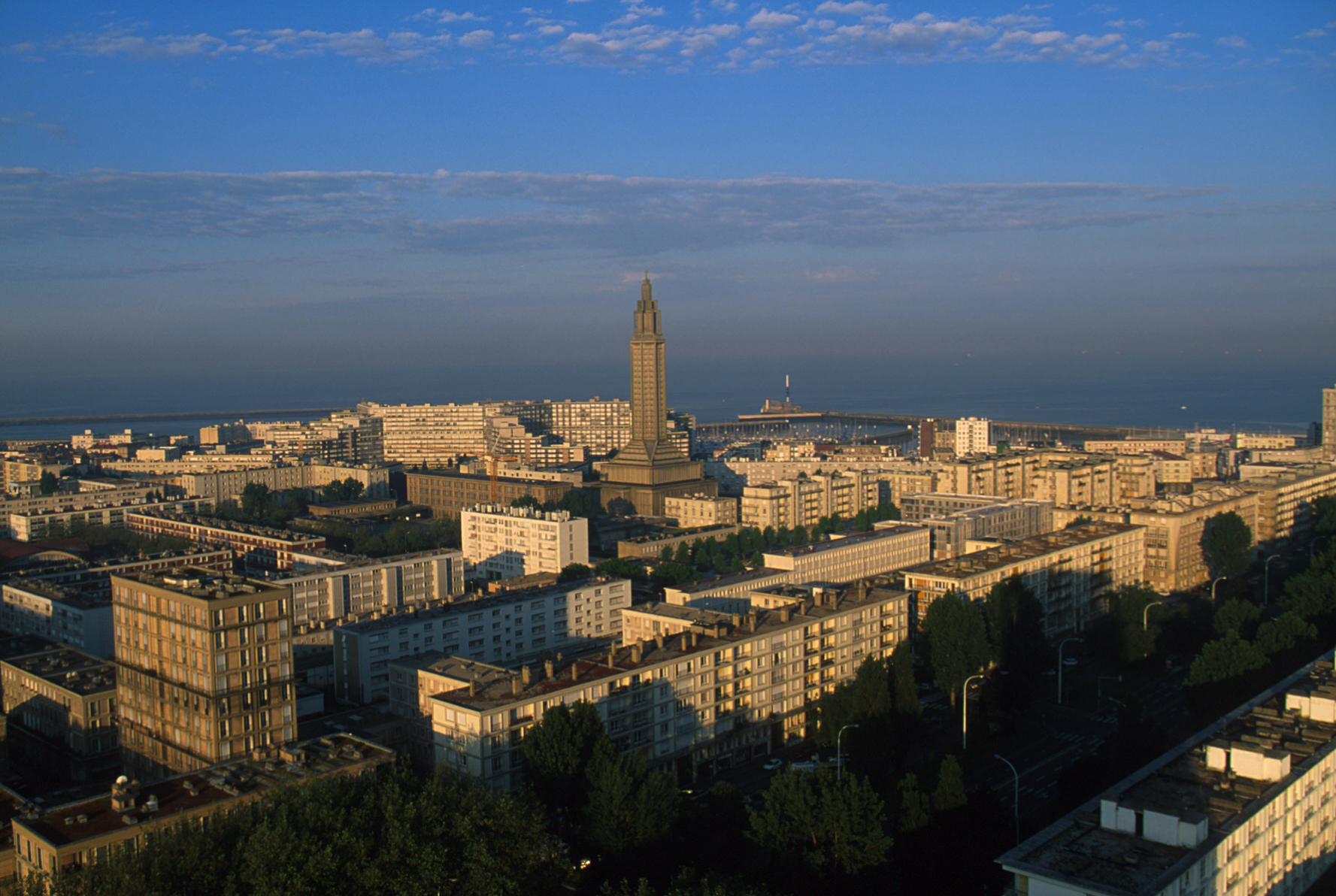
Le Havre

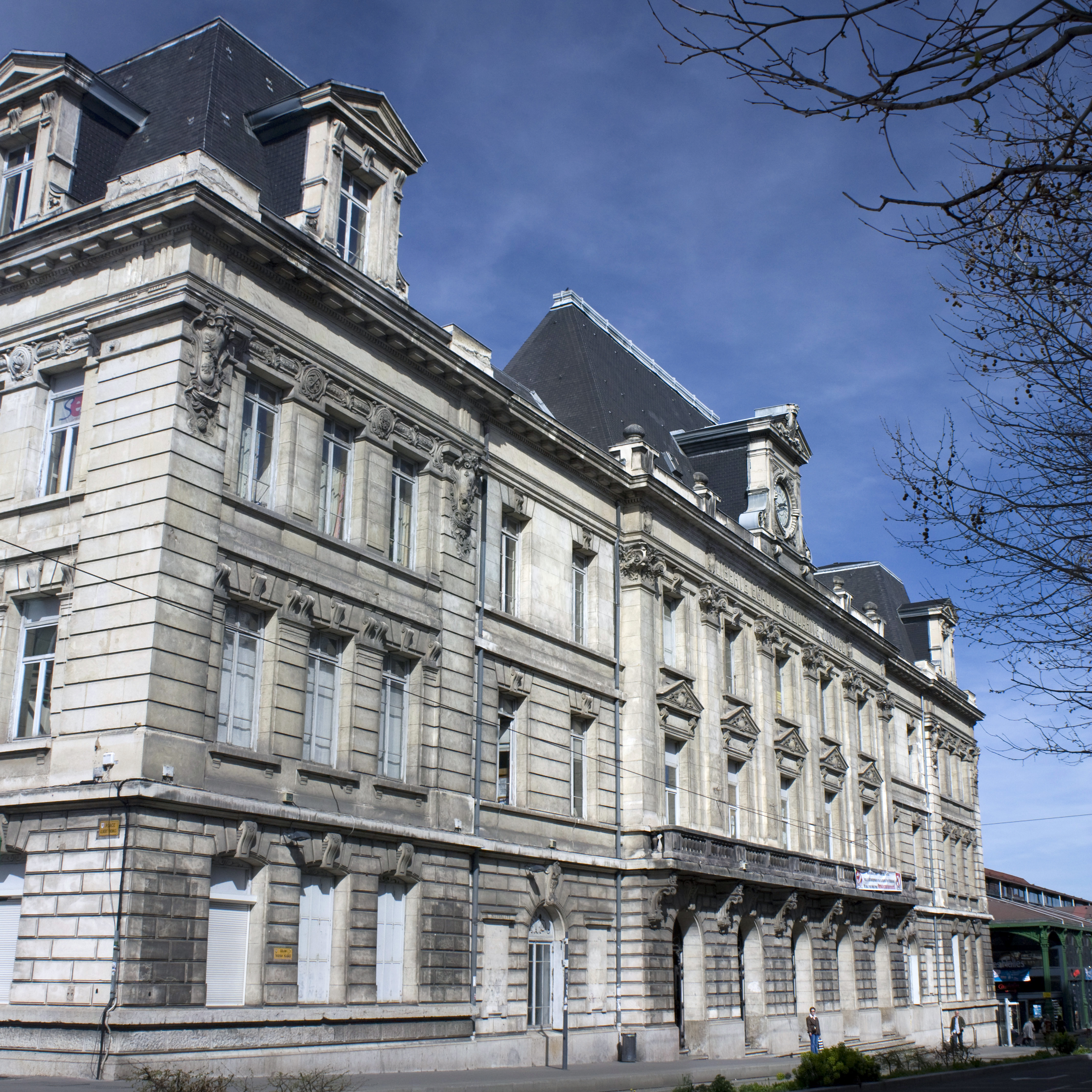
Saint-Étienne

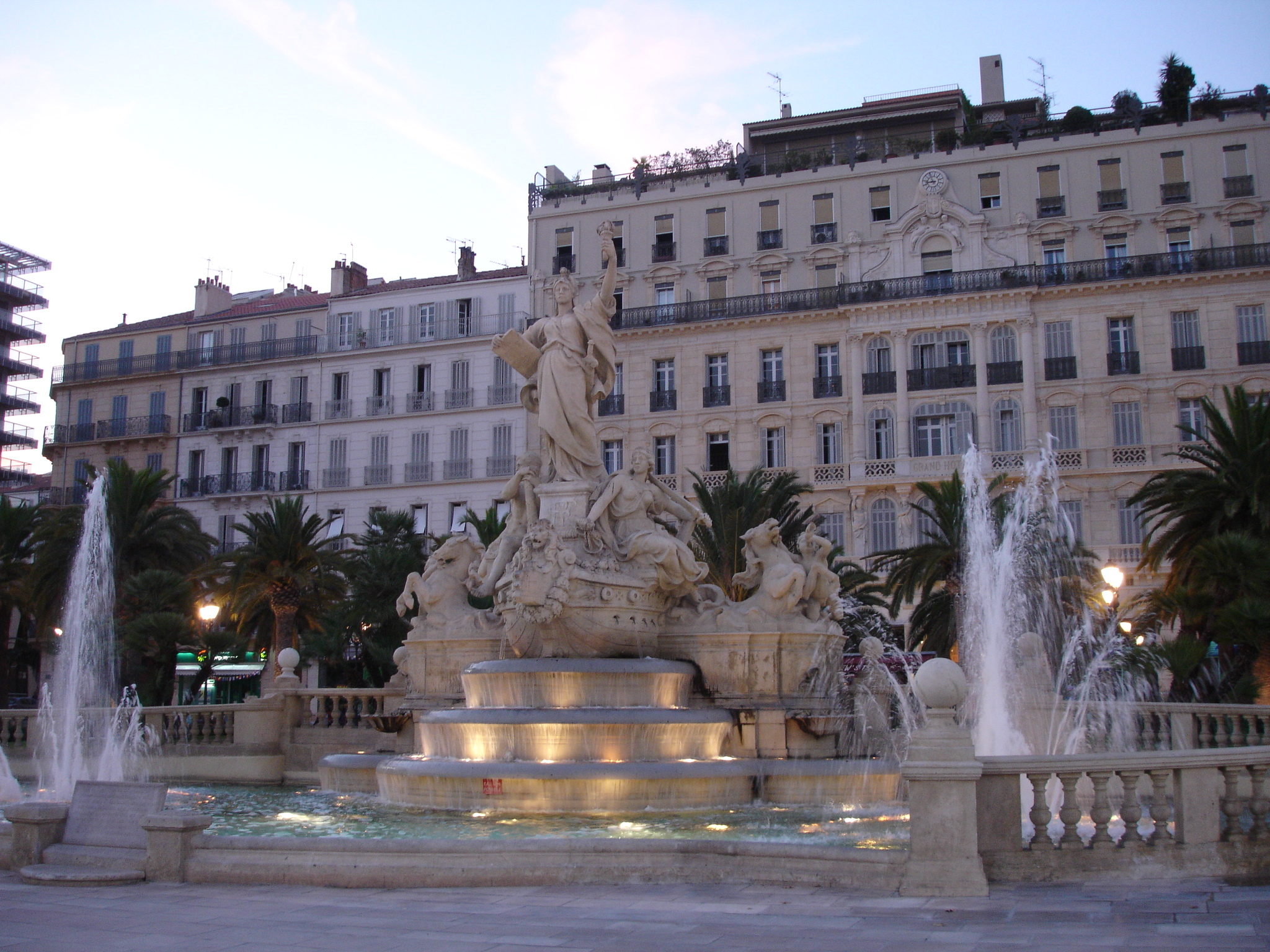
Toulon

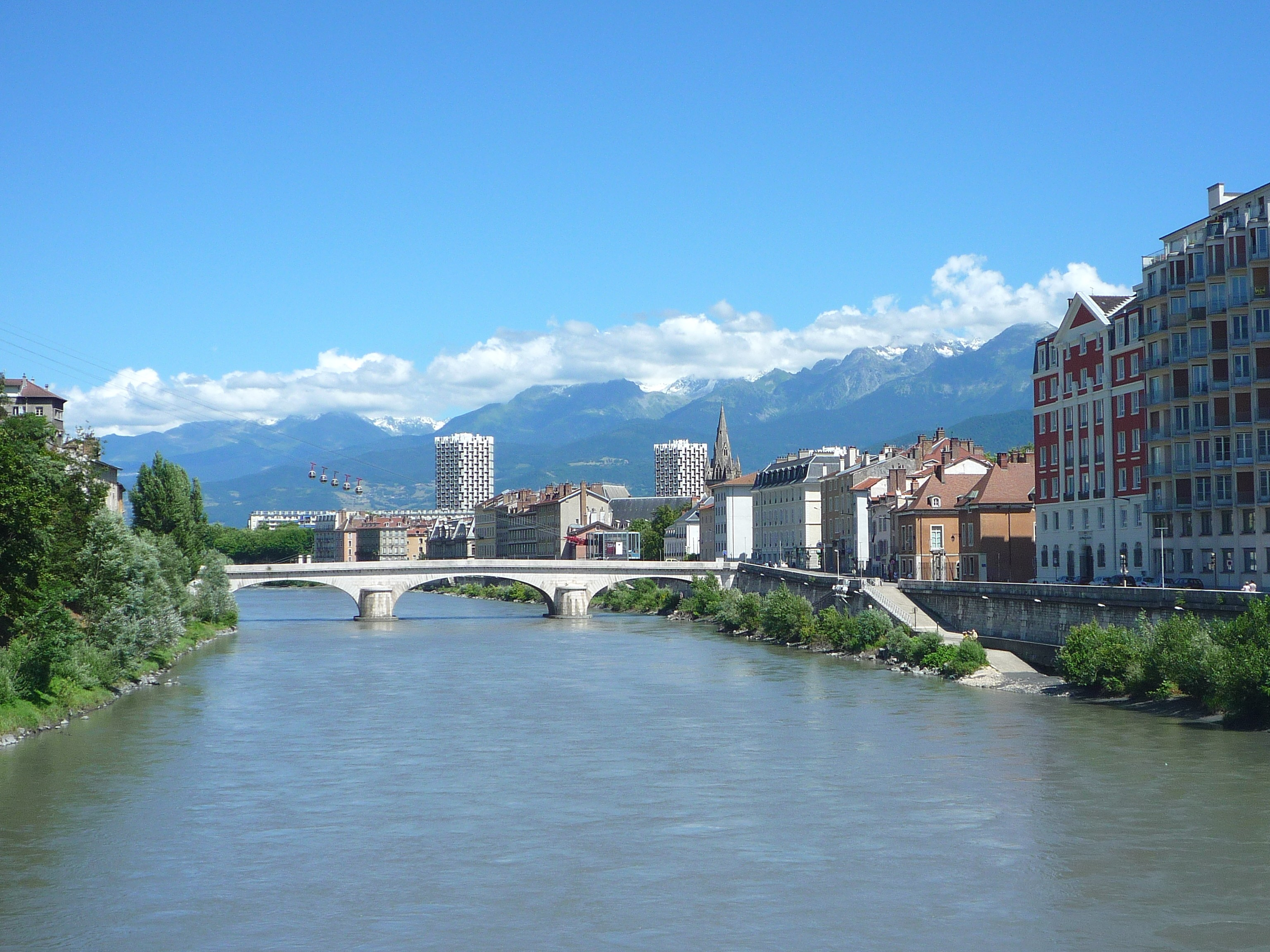
Grenoble

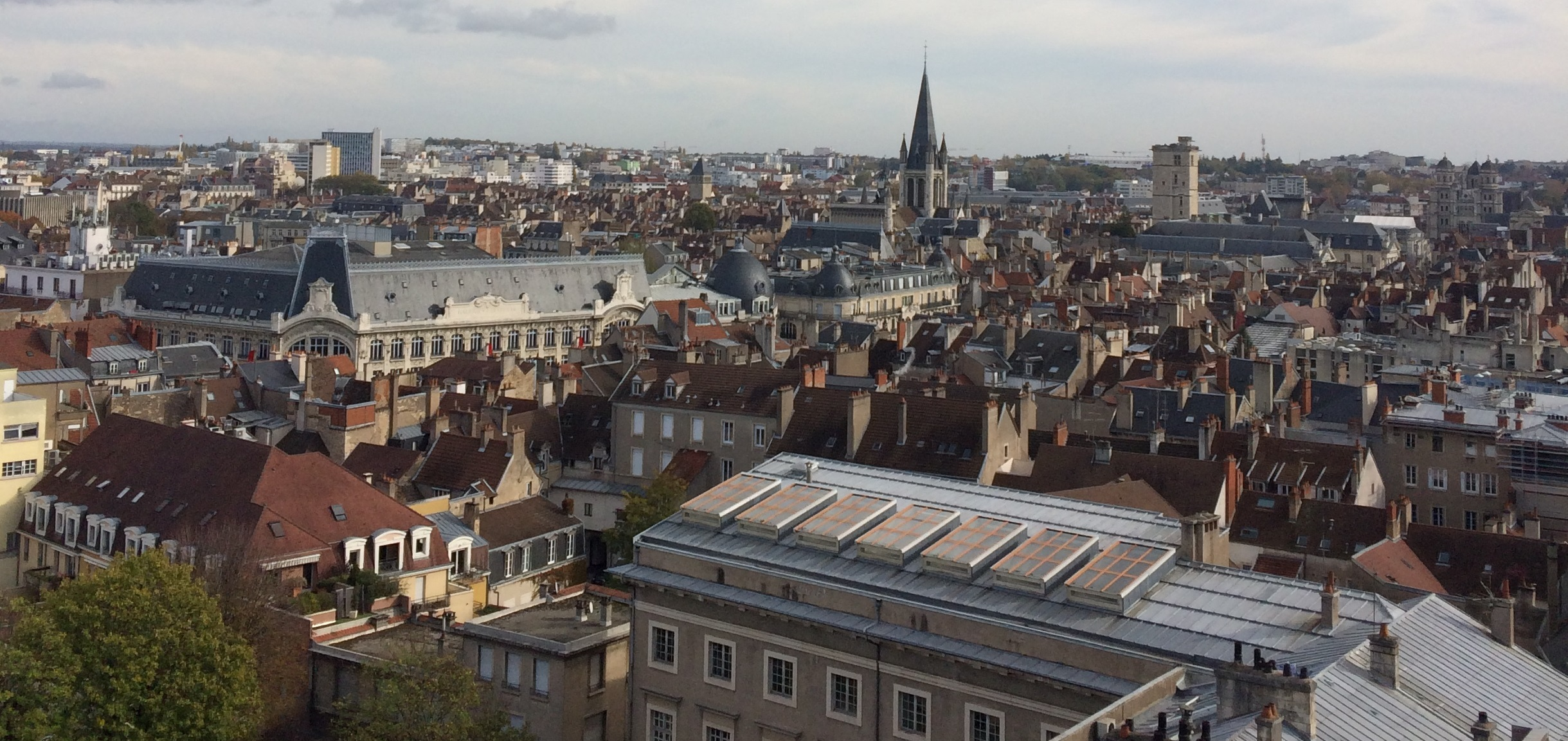
Dijon

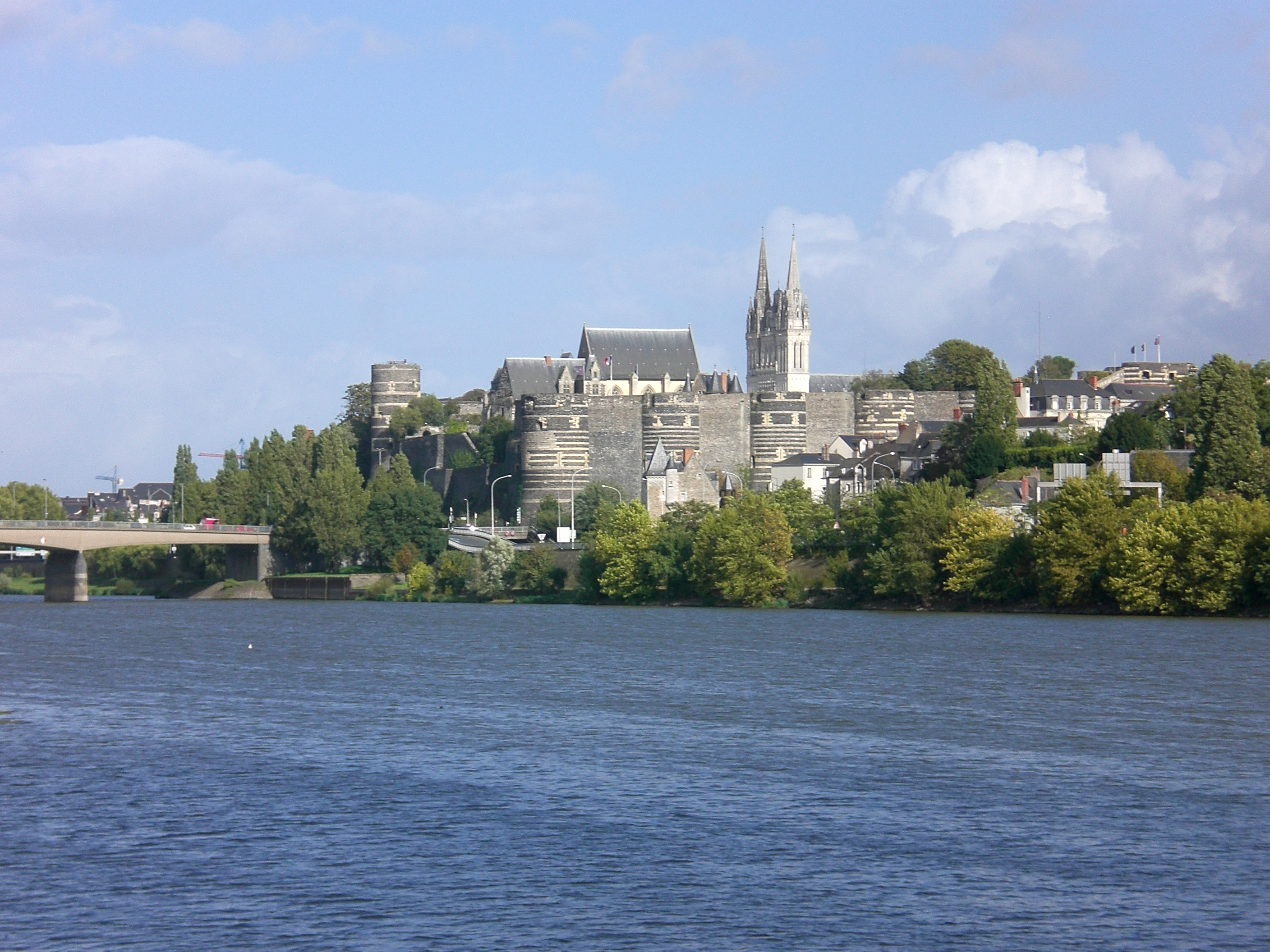
Angers

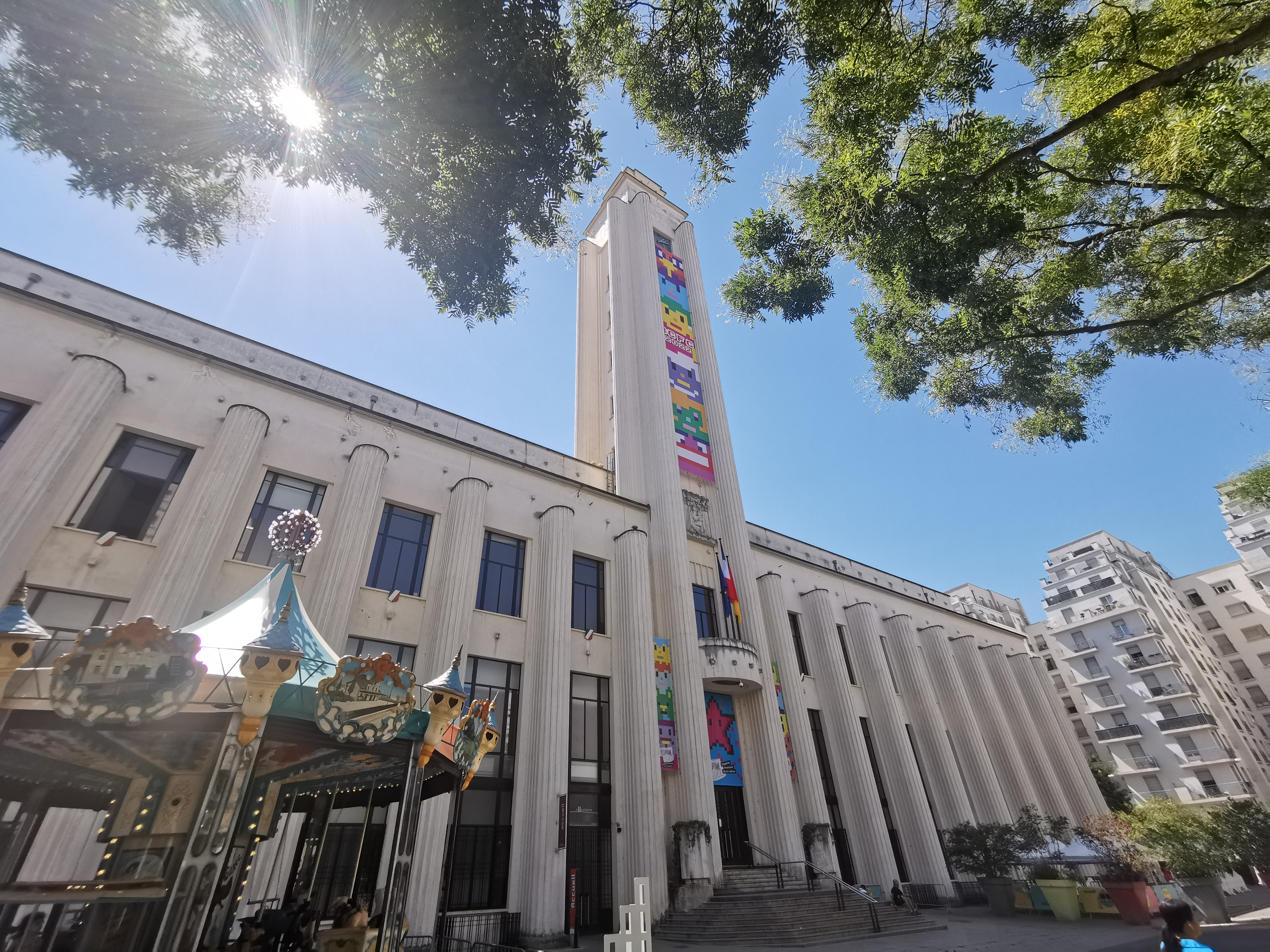
Villeurbanne

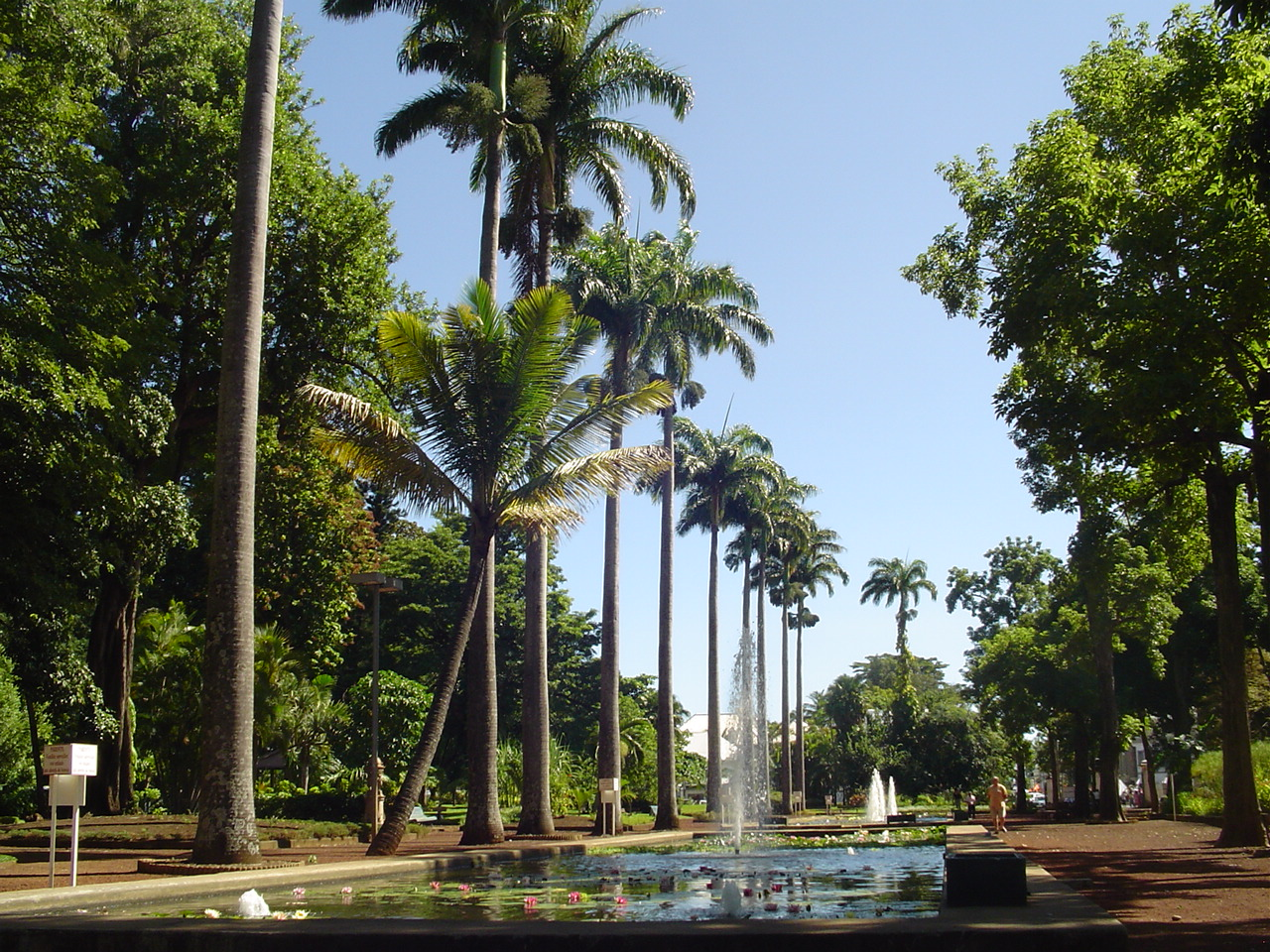
Saint-Denis, Réunion

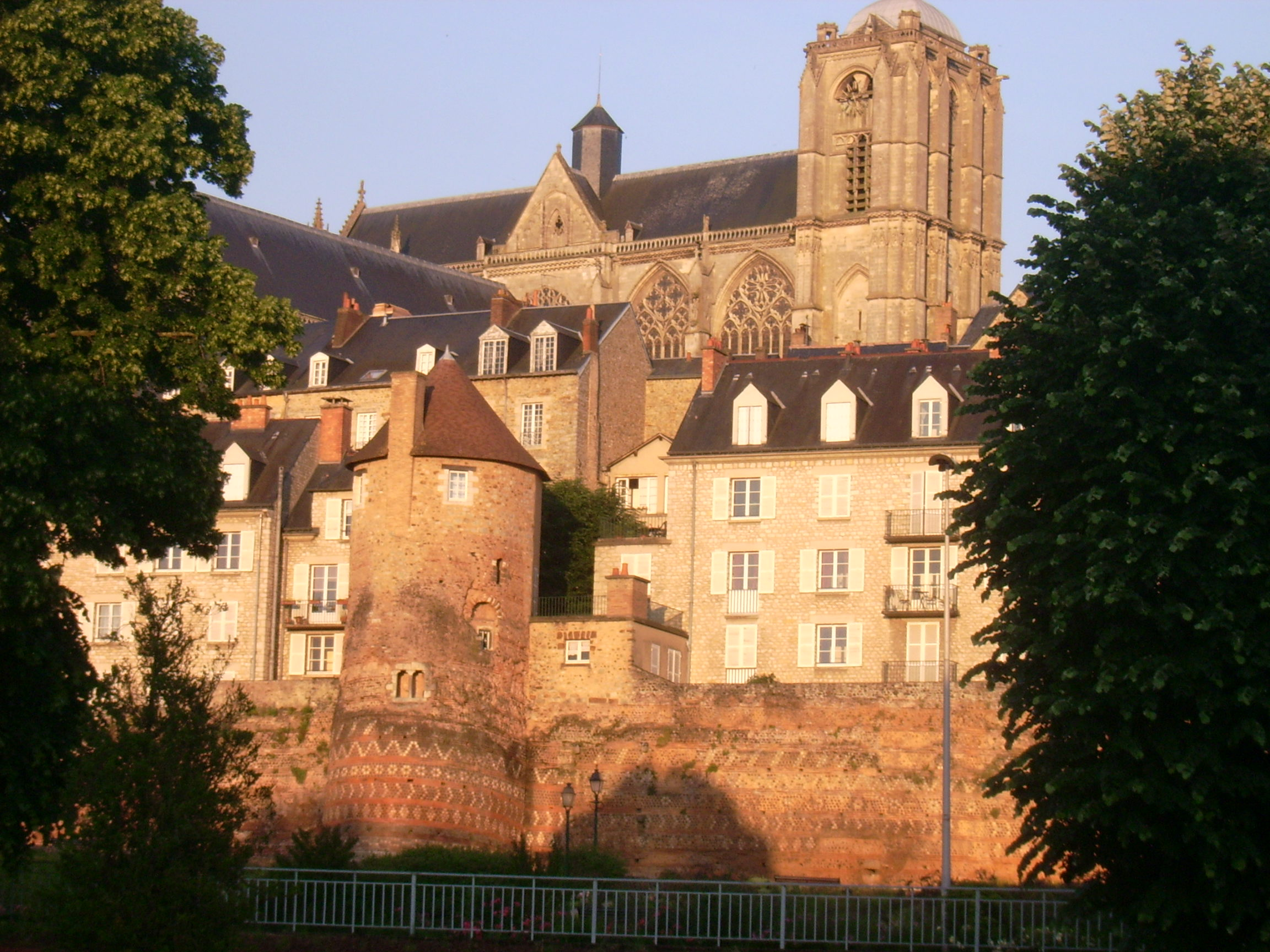
Le Mans

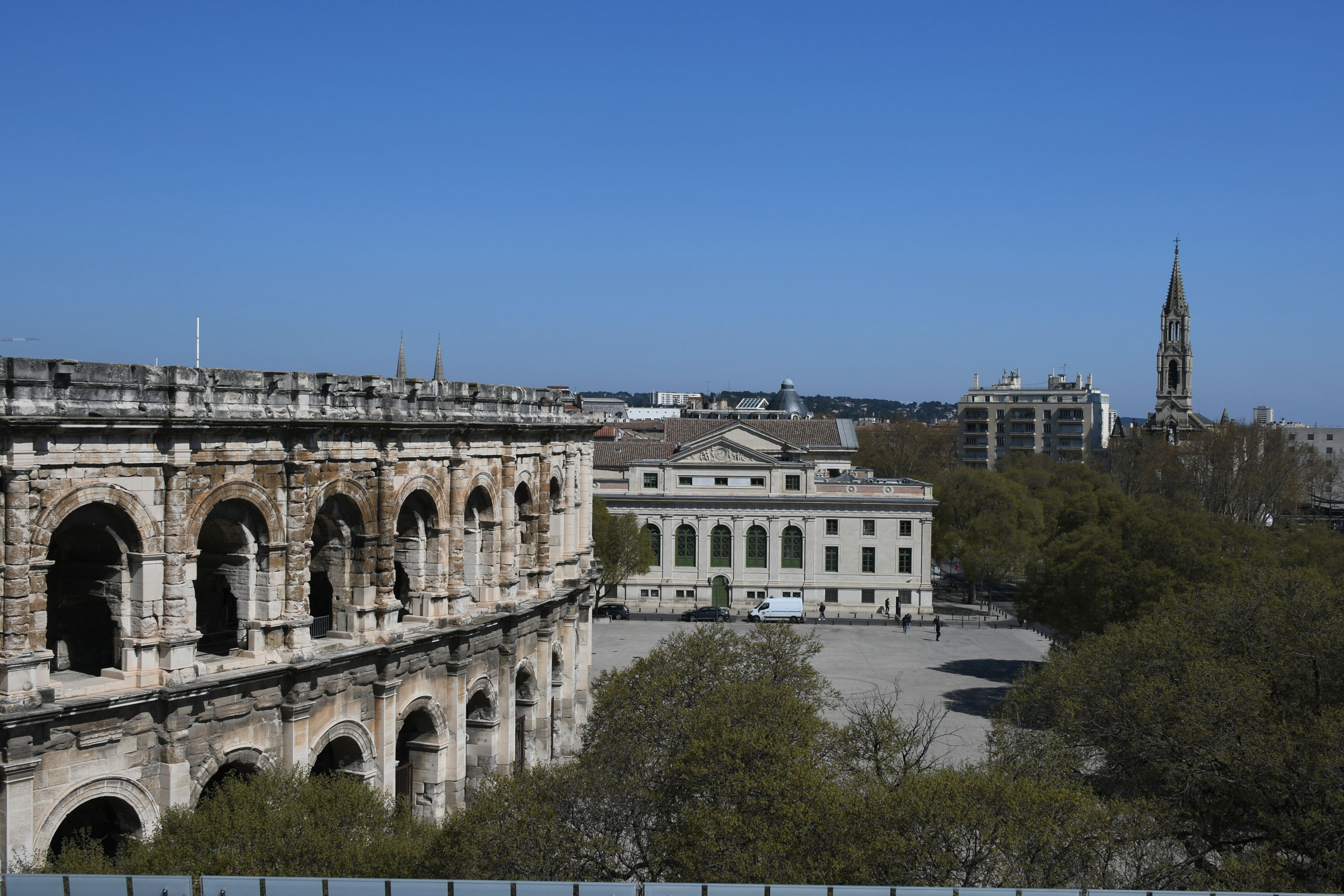
Nîmes

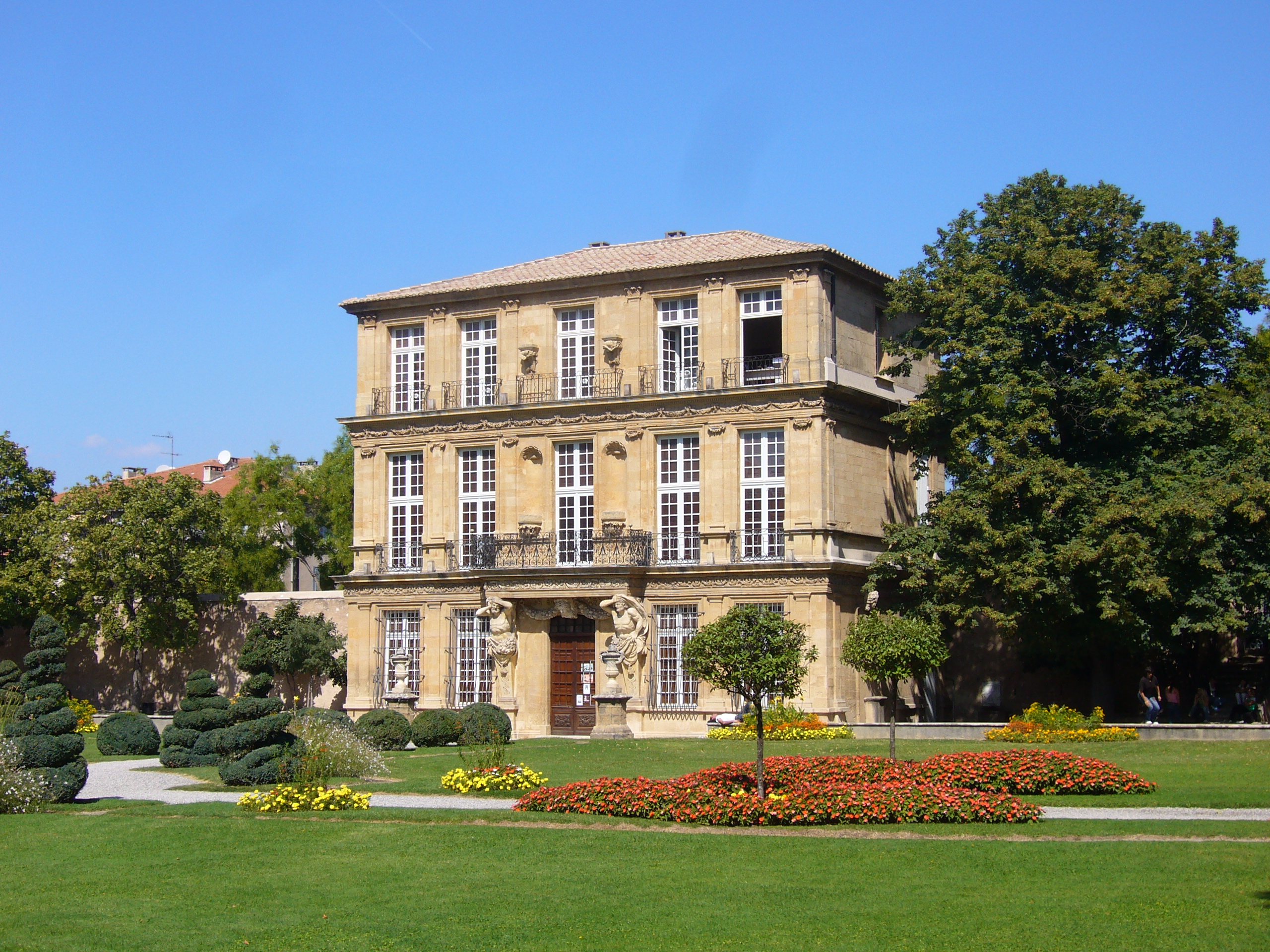
Aix-en-Provence

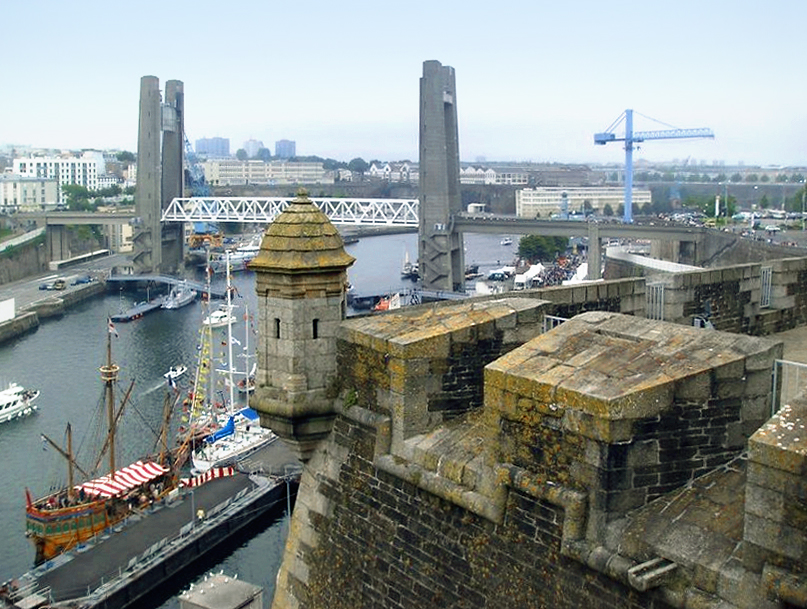
Brest

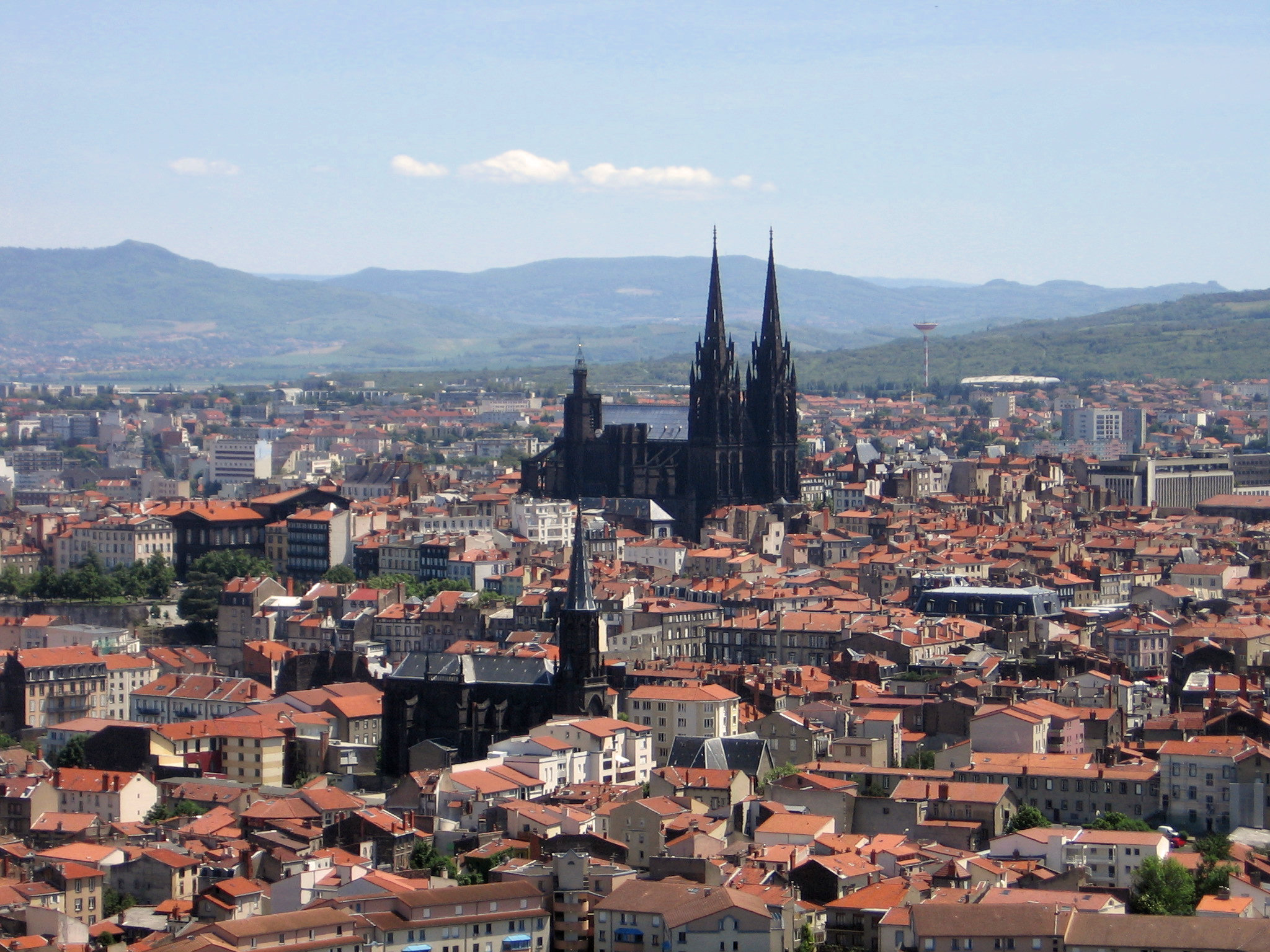
Clermont-Ferrand

Limoges

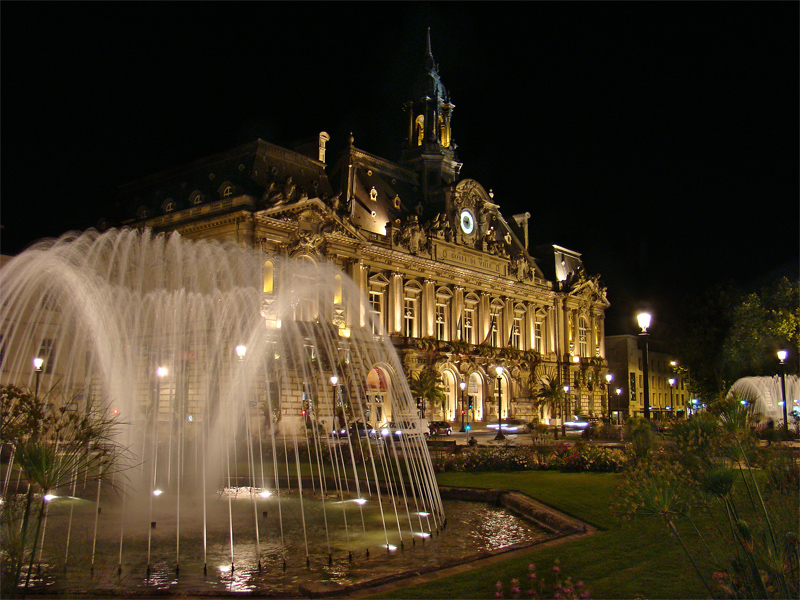
Tours

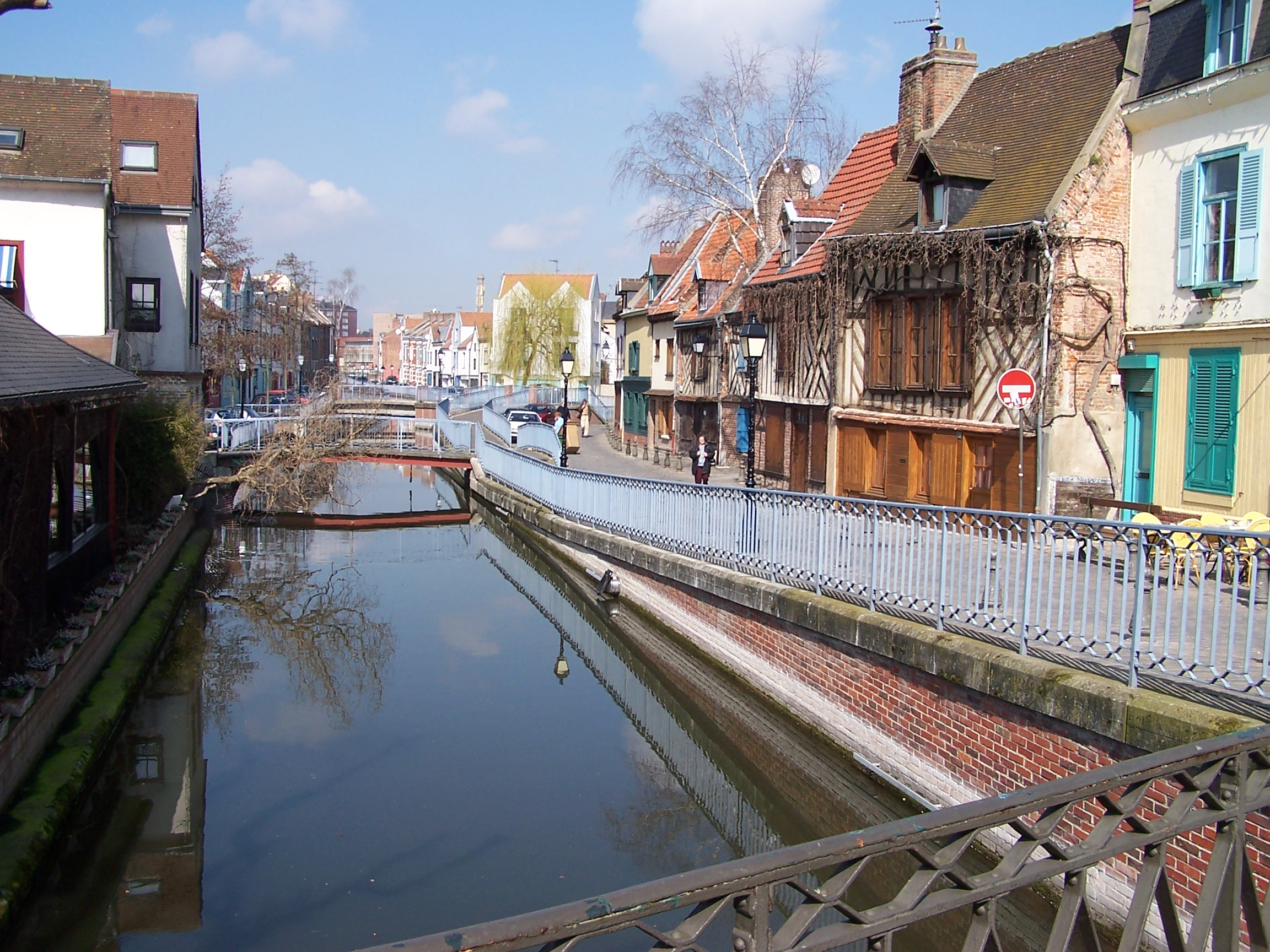
Amiens

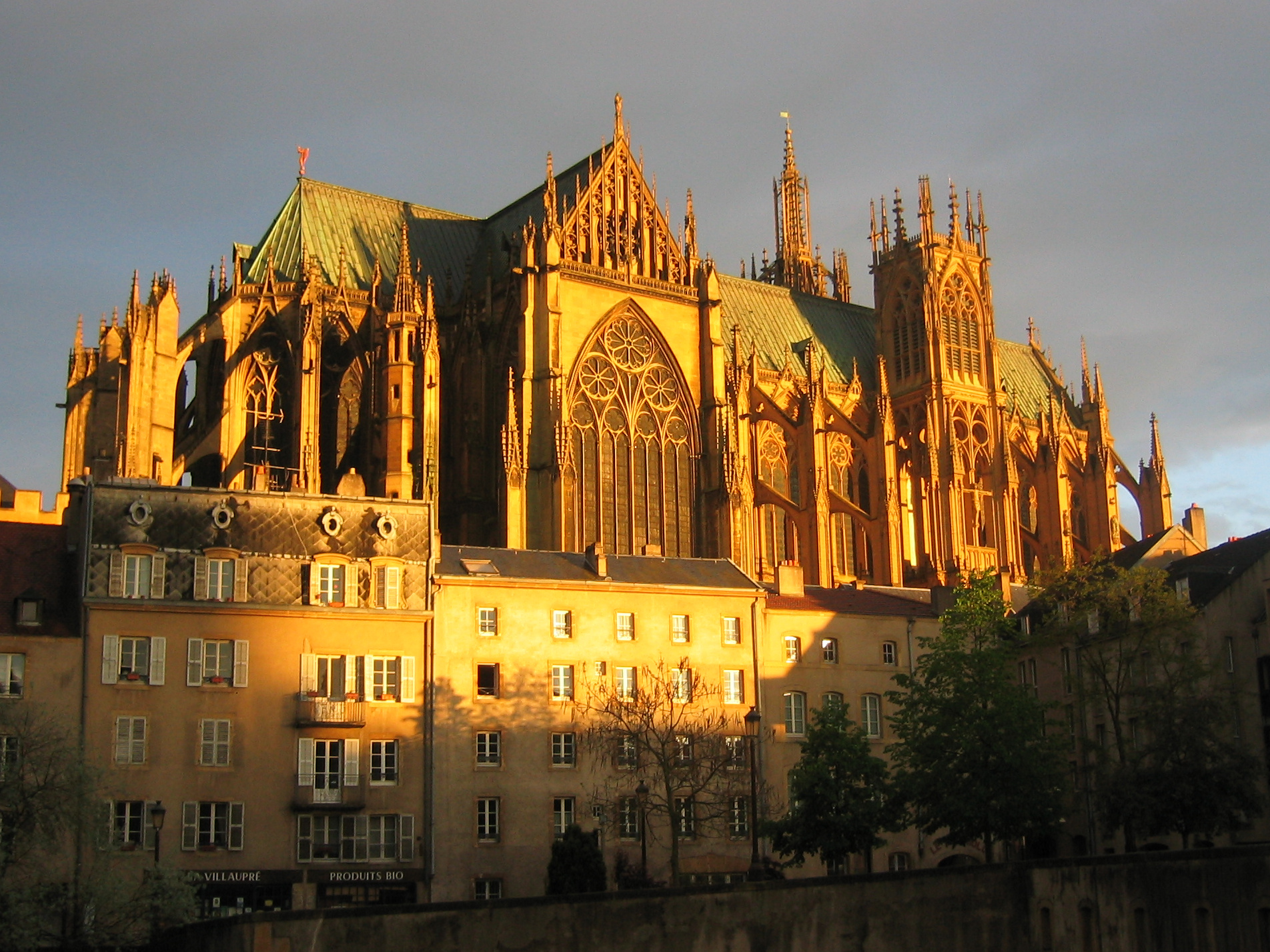
Metz

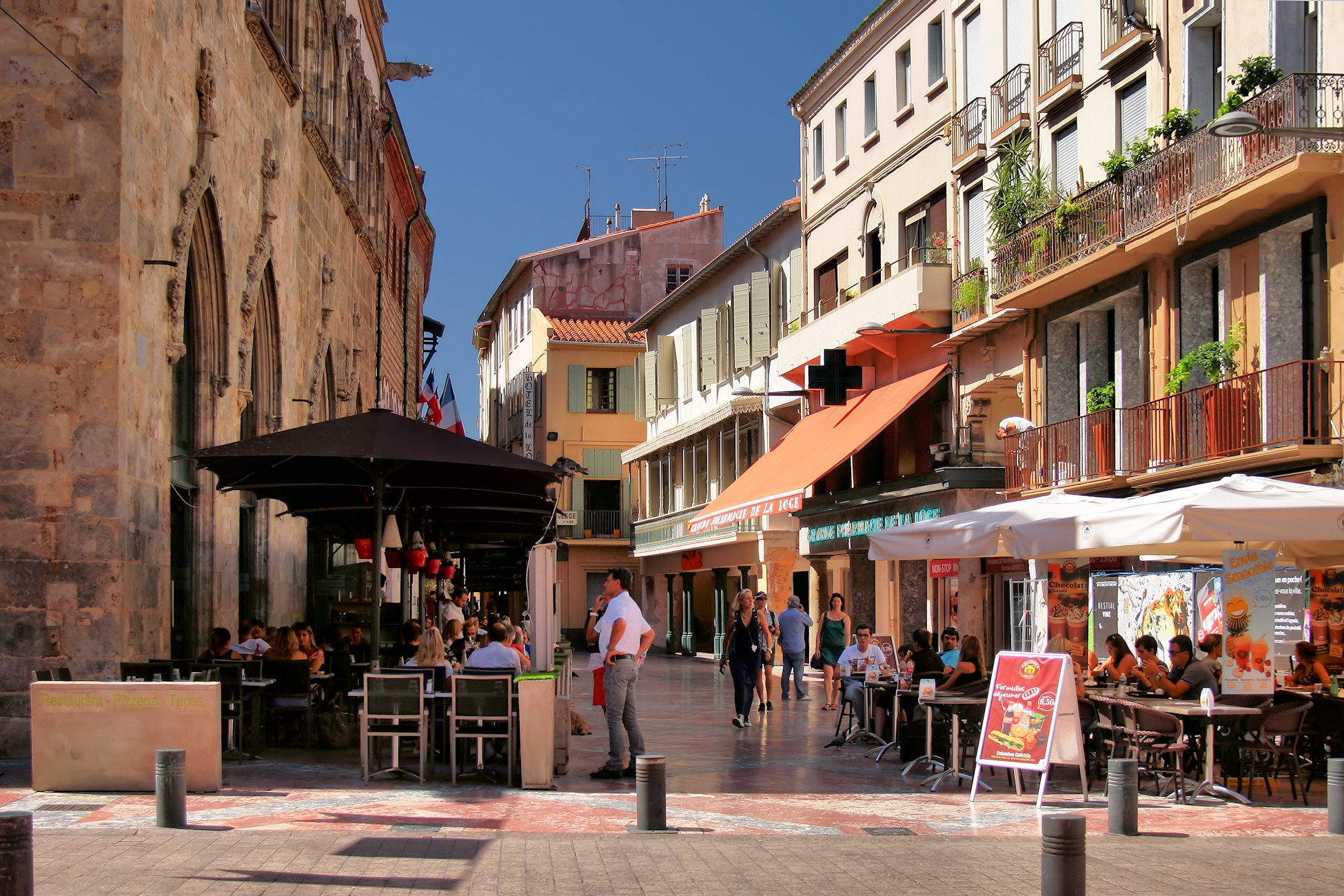
Perpignan

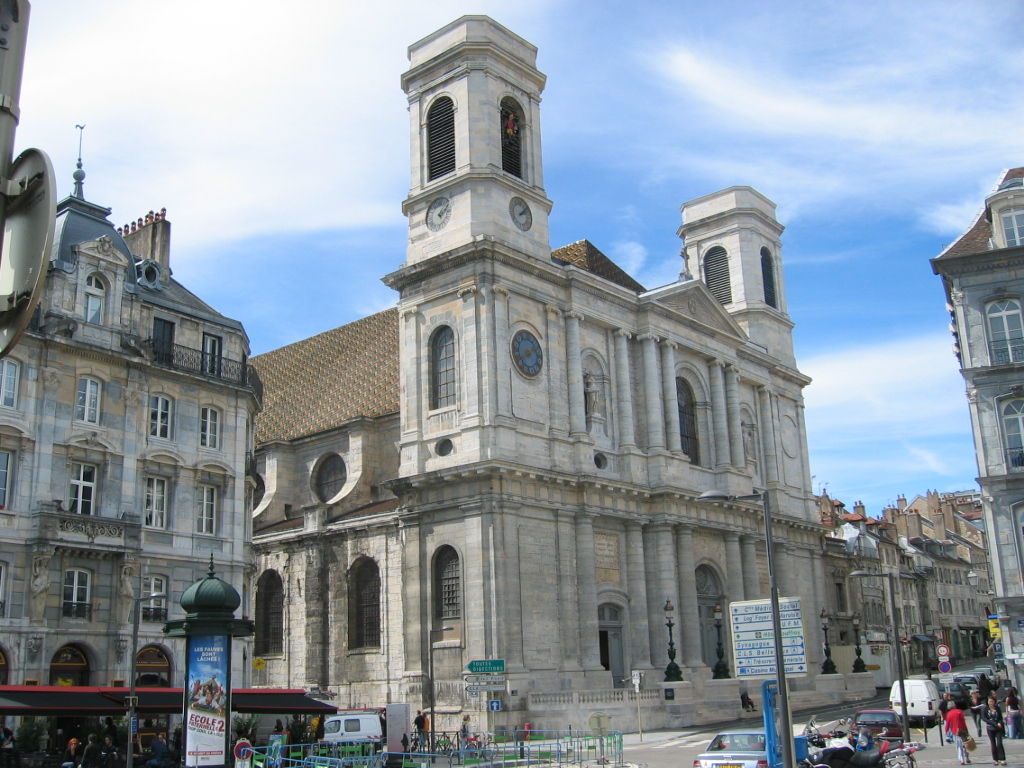
Besançon

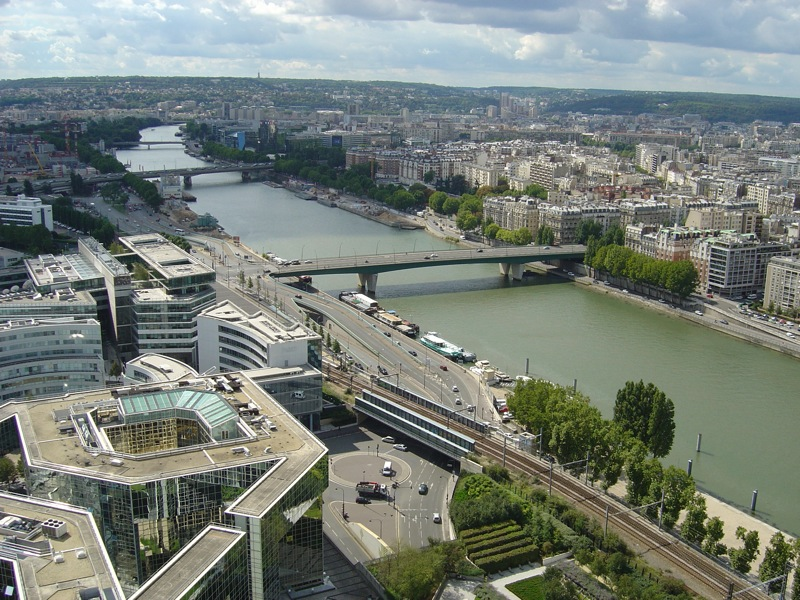
Boulogne-Billancourt

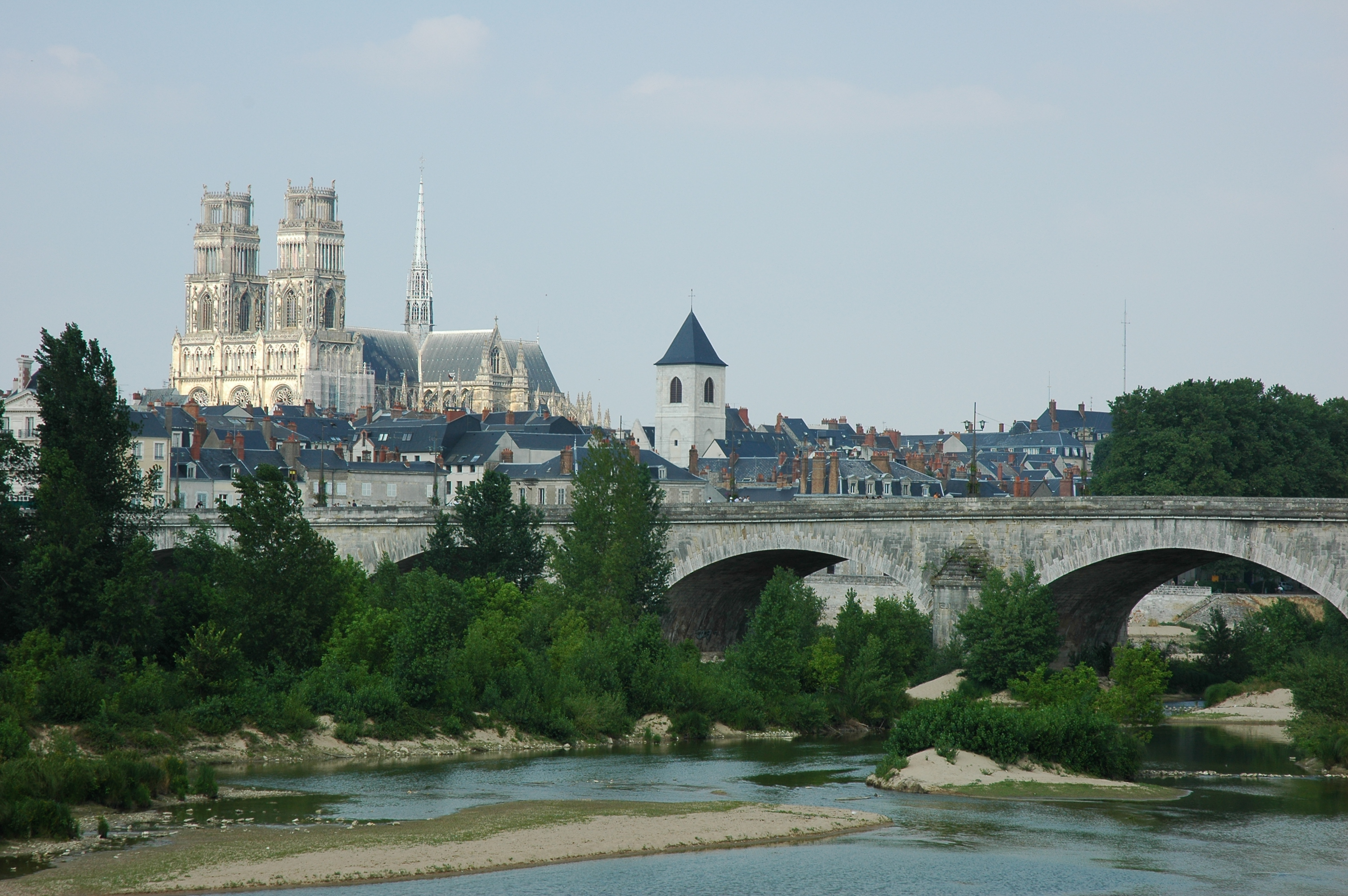
Orléans

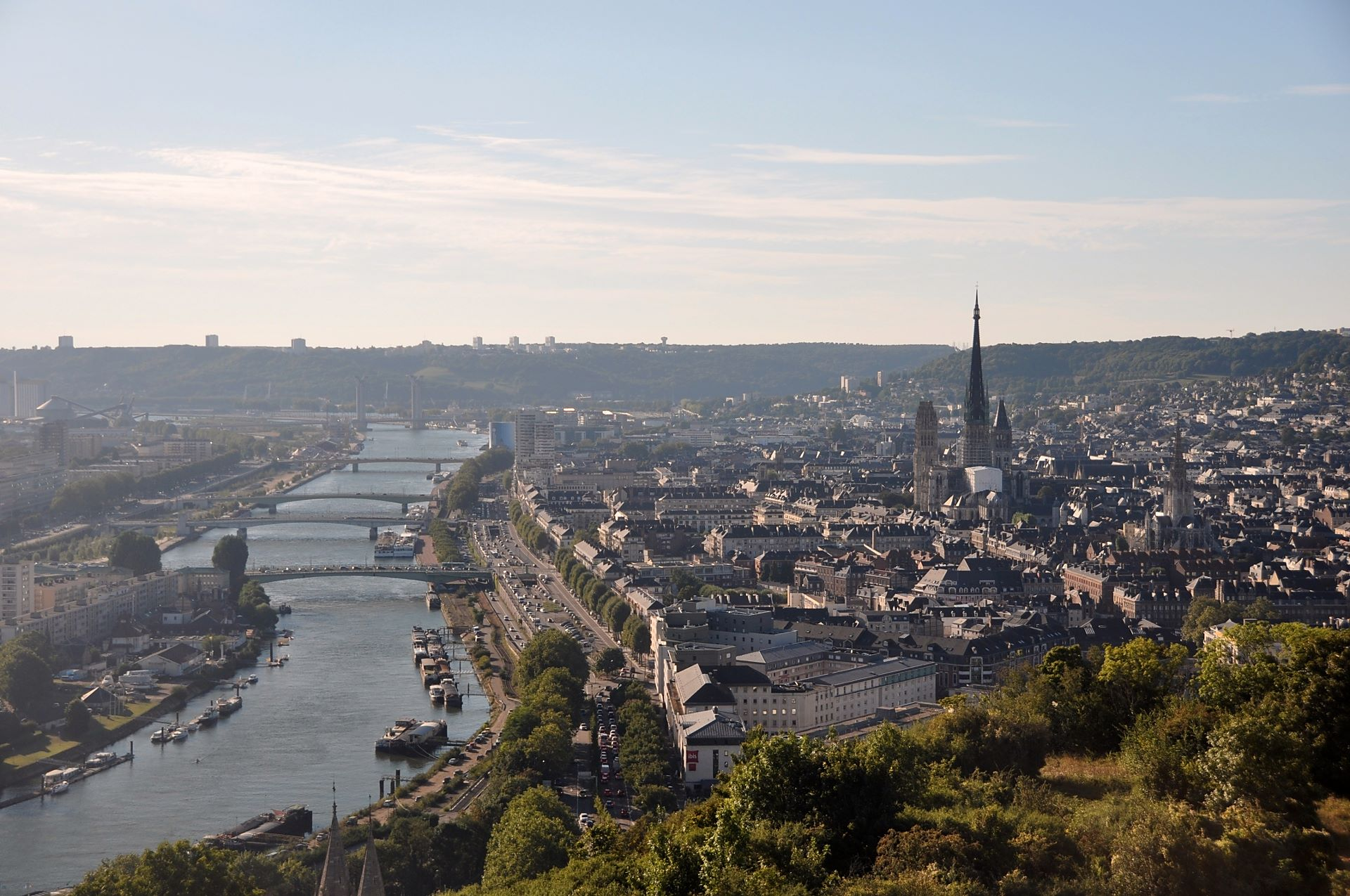
Rouen

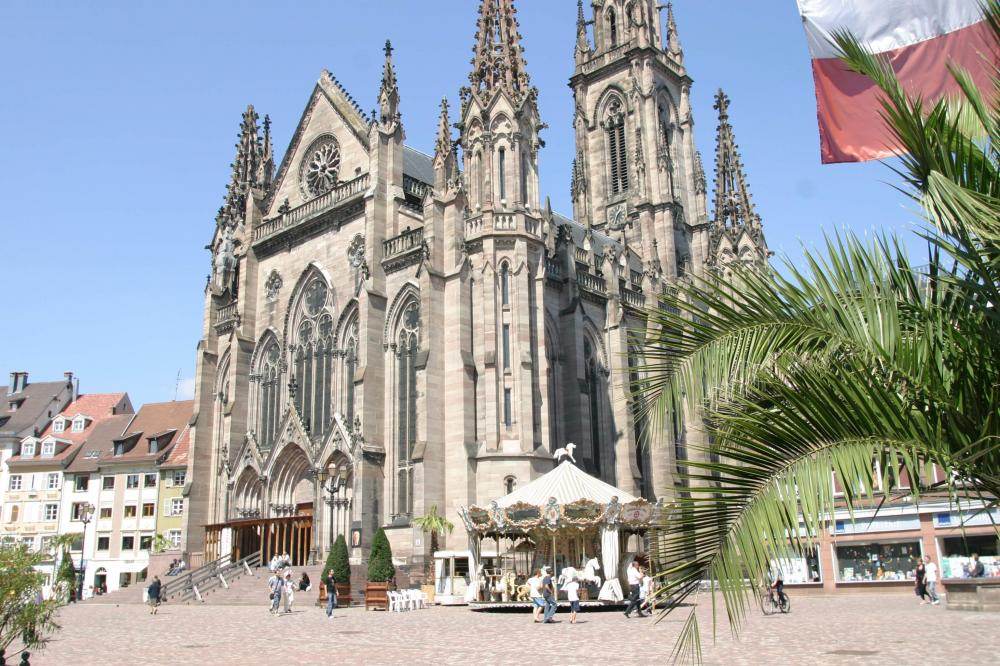
Mulhouse

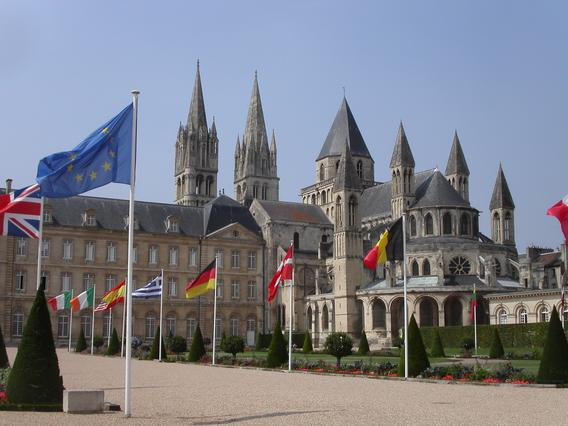
Caen

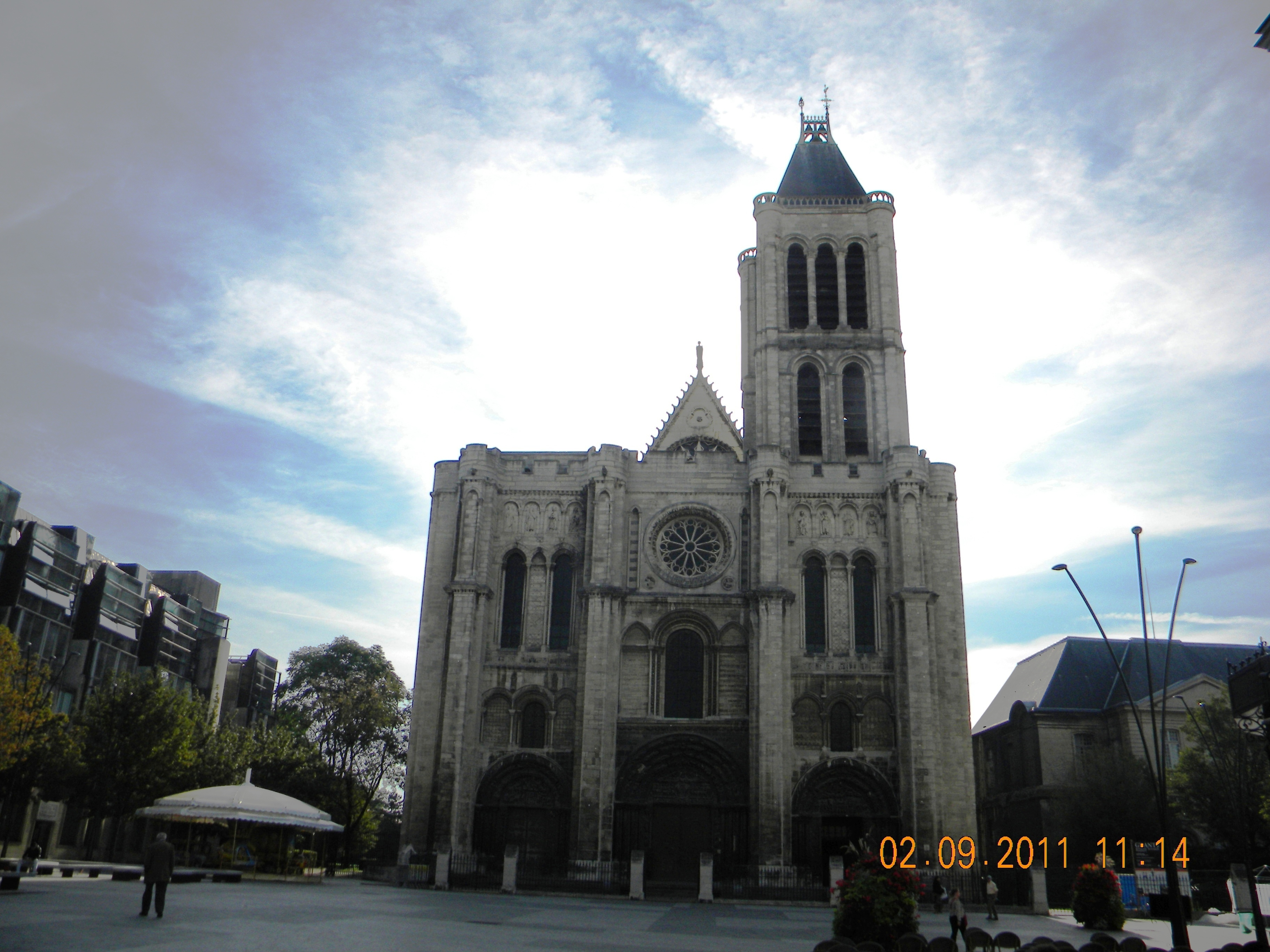
Saint-Denis, Seine-Saint-Denis

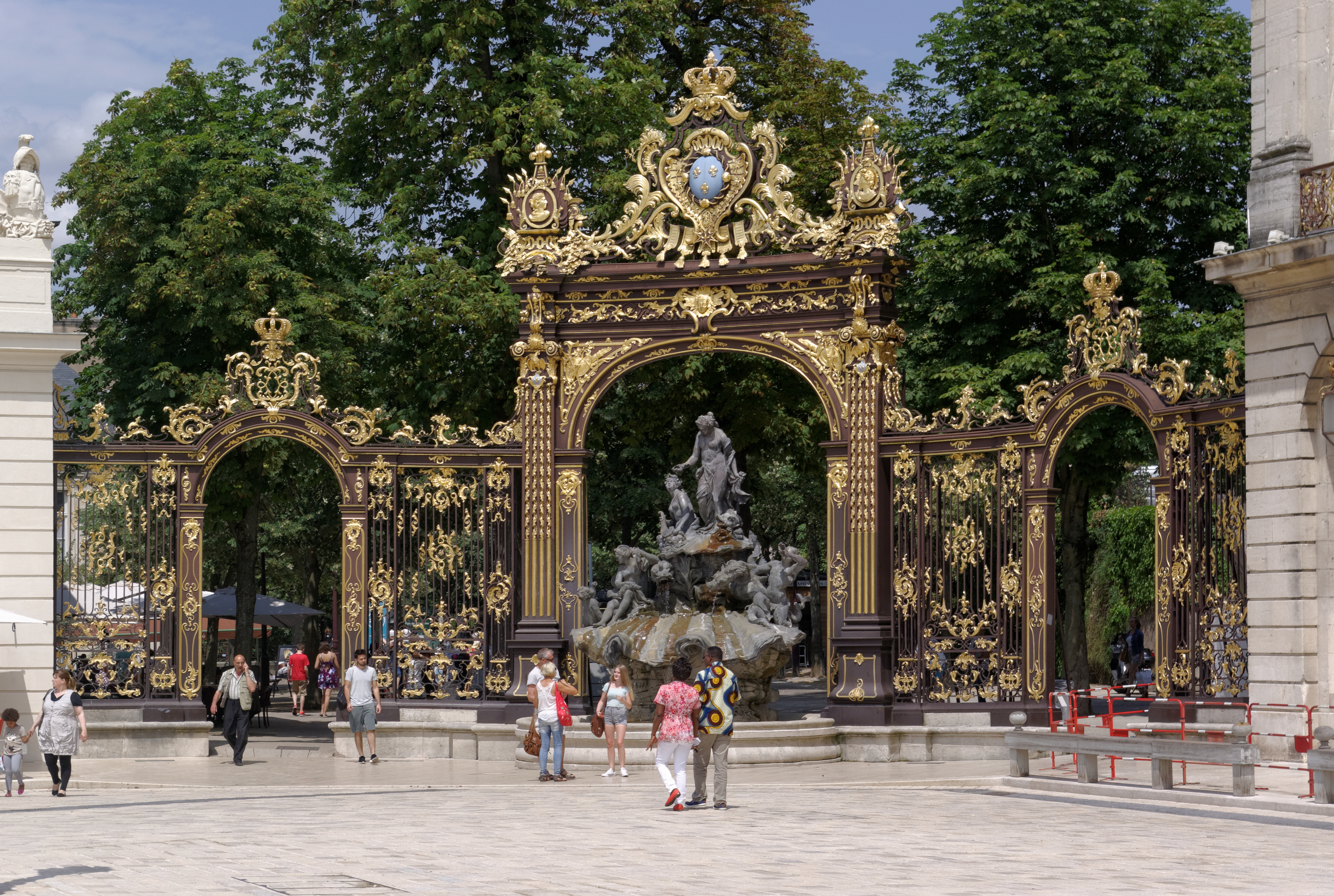
Nancy

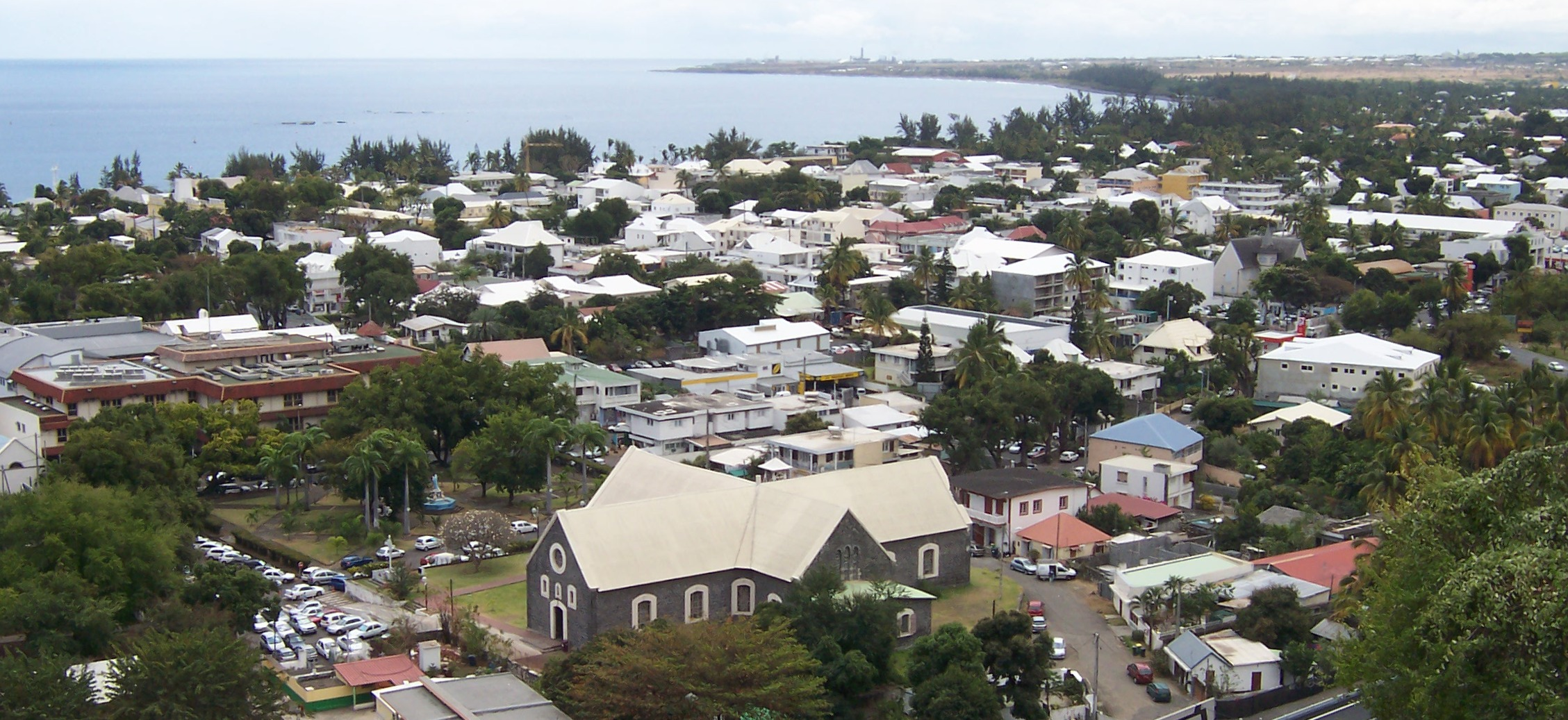
Saint-Paul

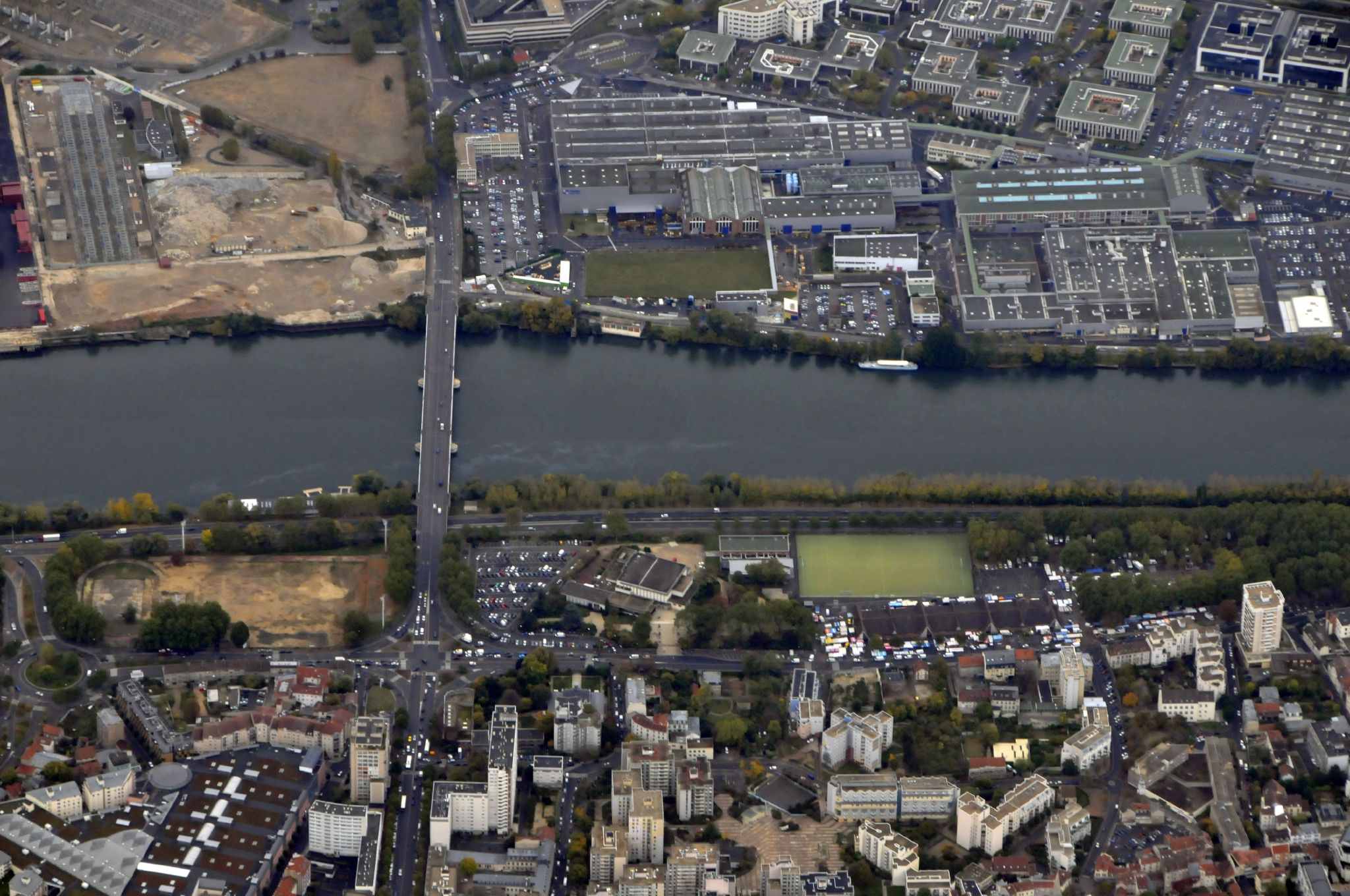
Argenteuil

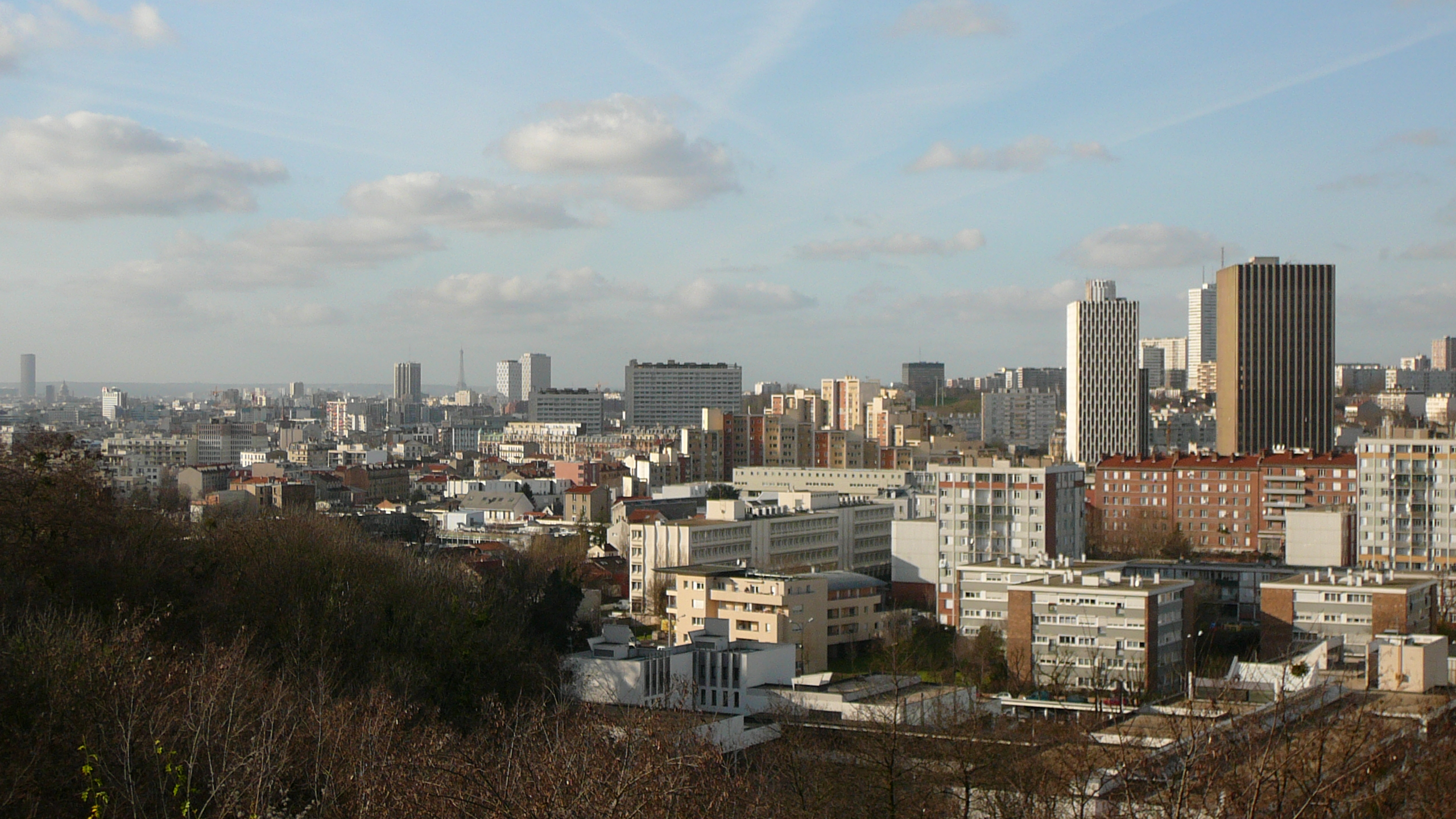
Montreuil

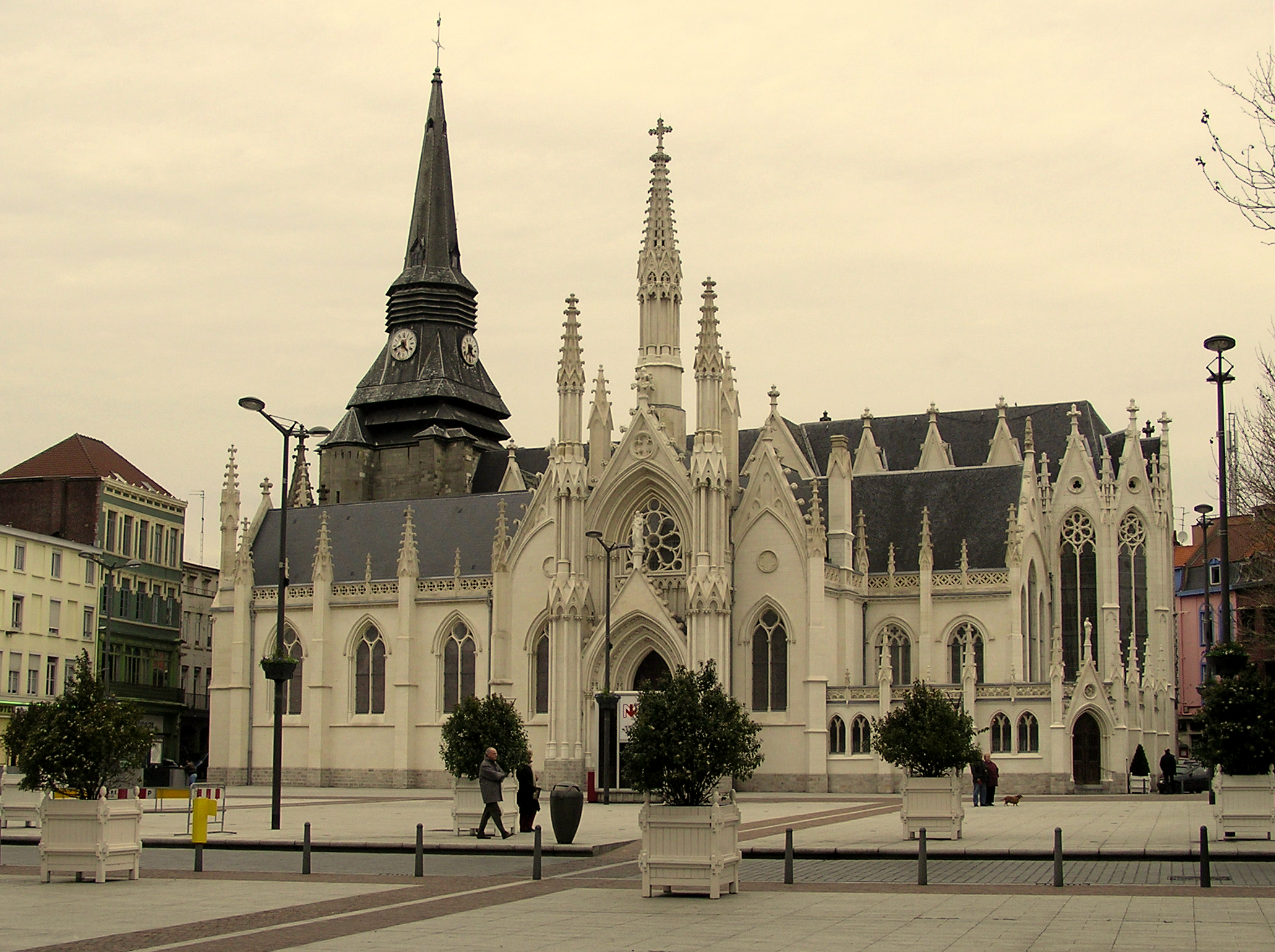
Roubaix

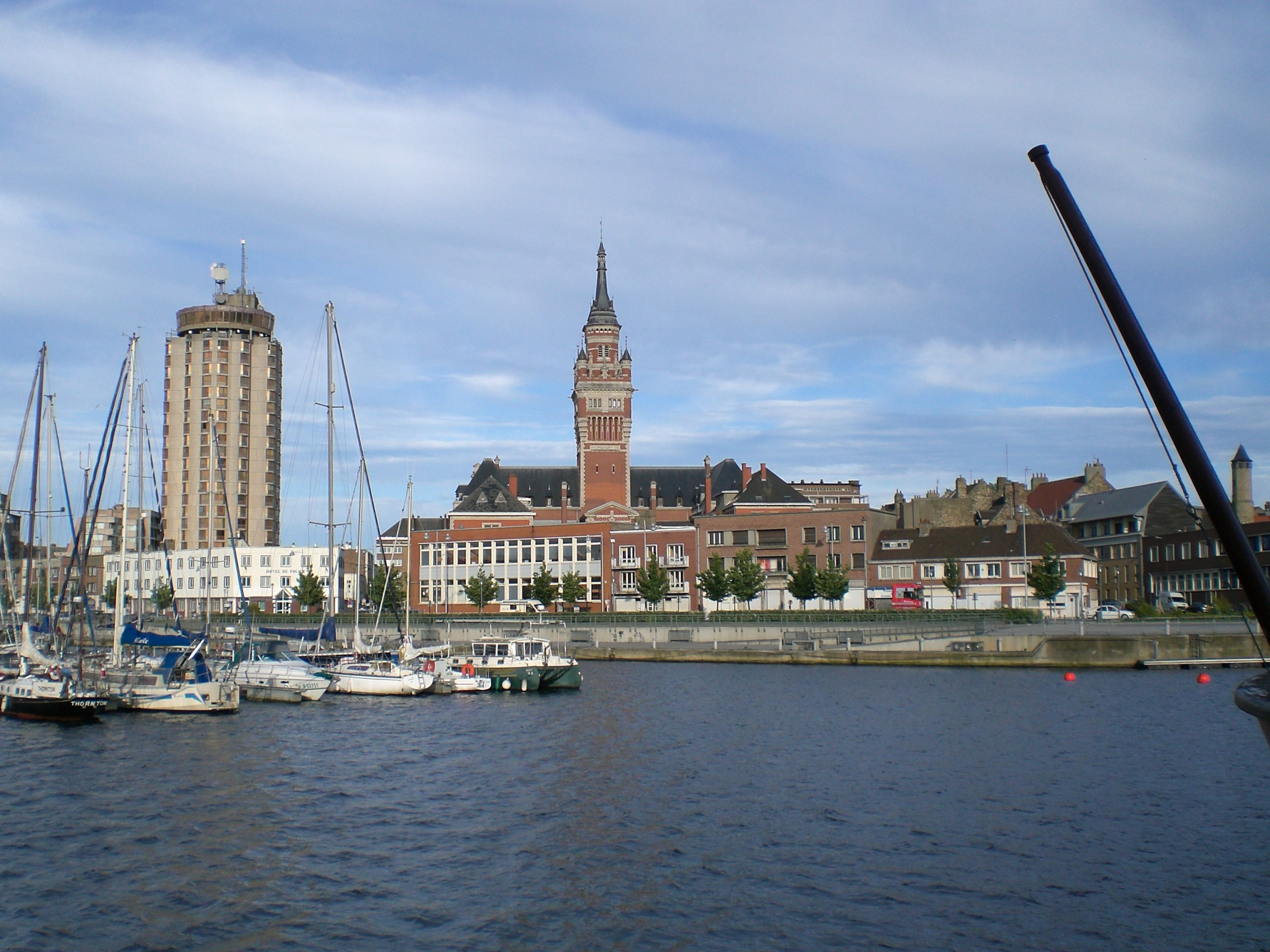
Dunkirk

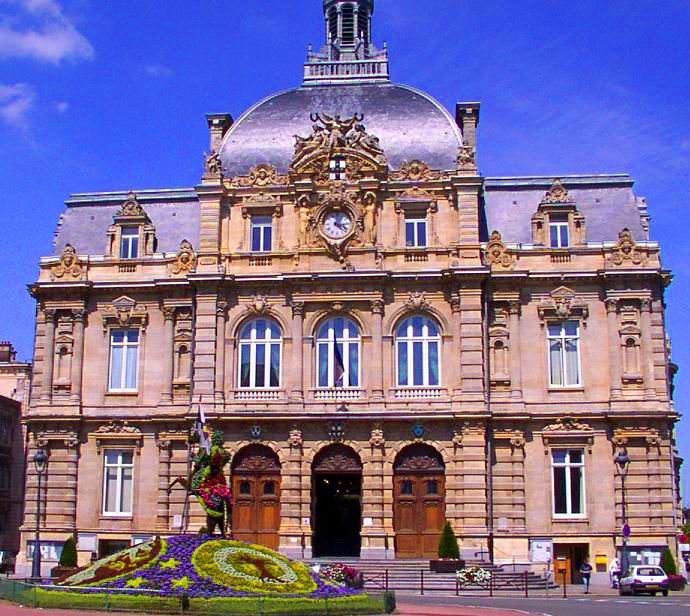
Tourcoing

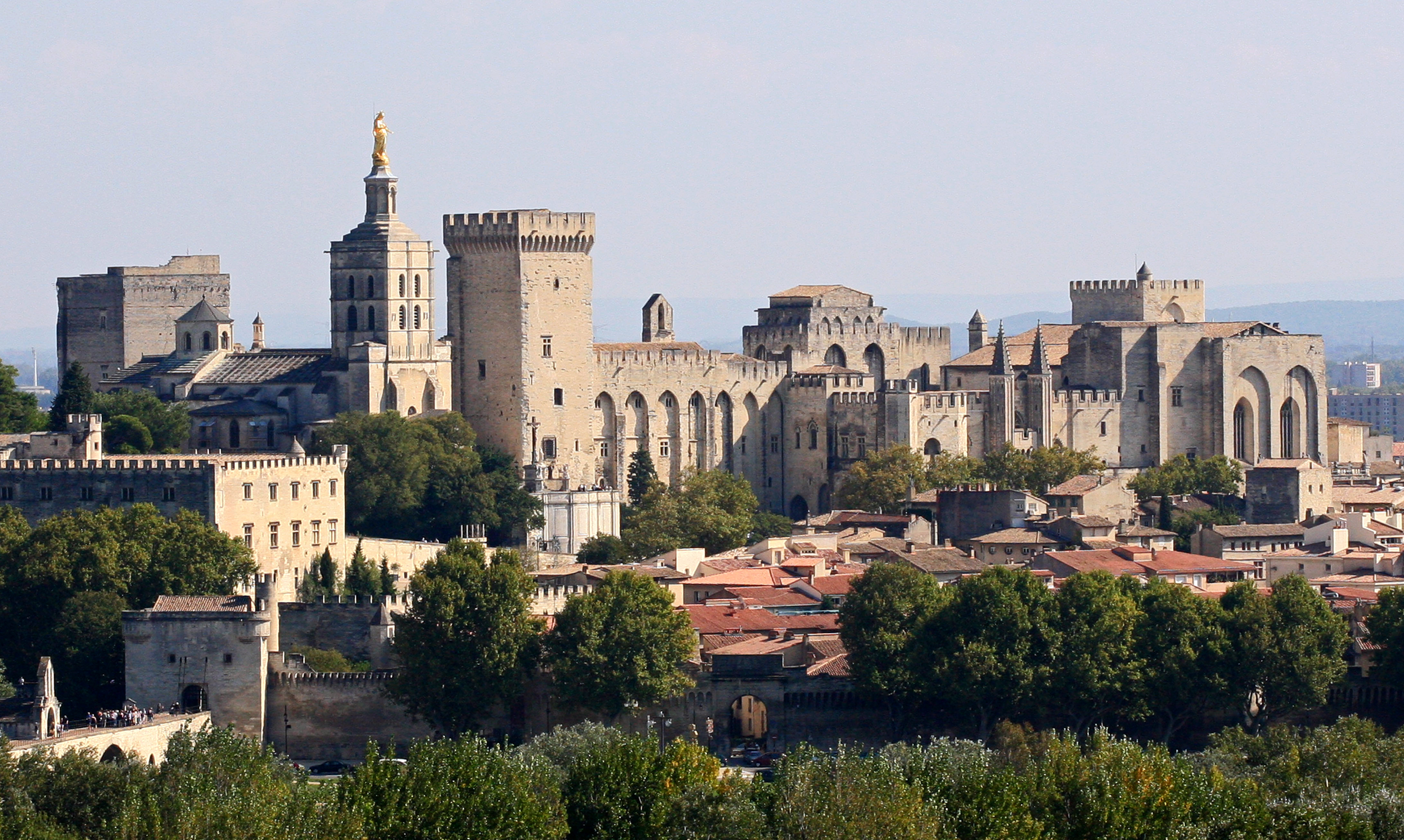
Avignon

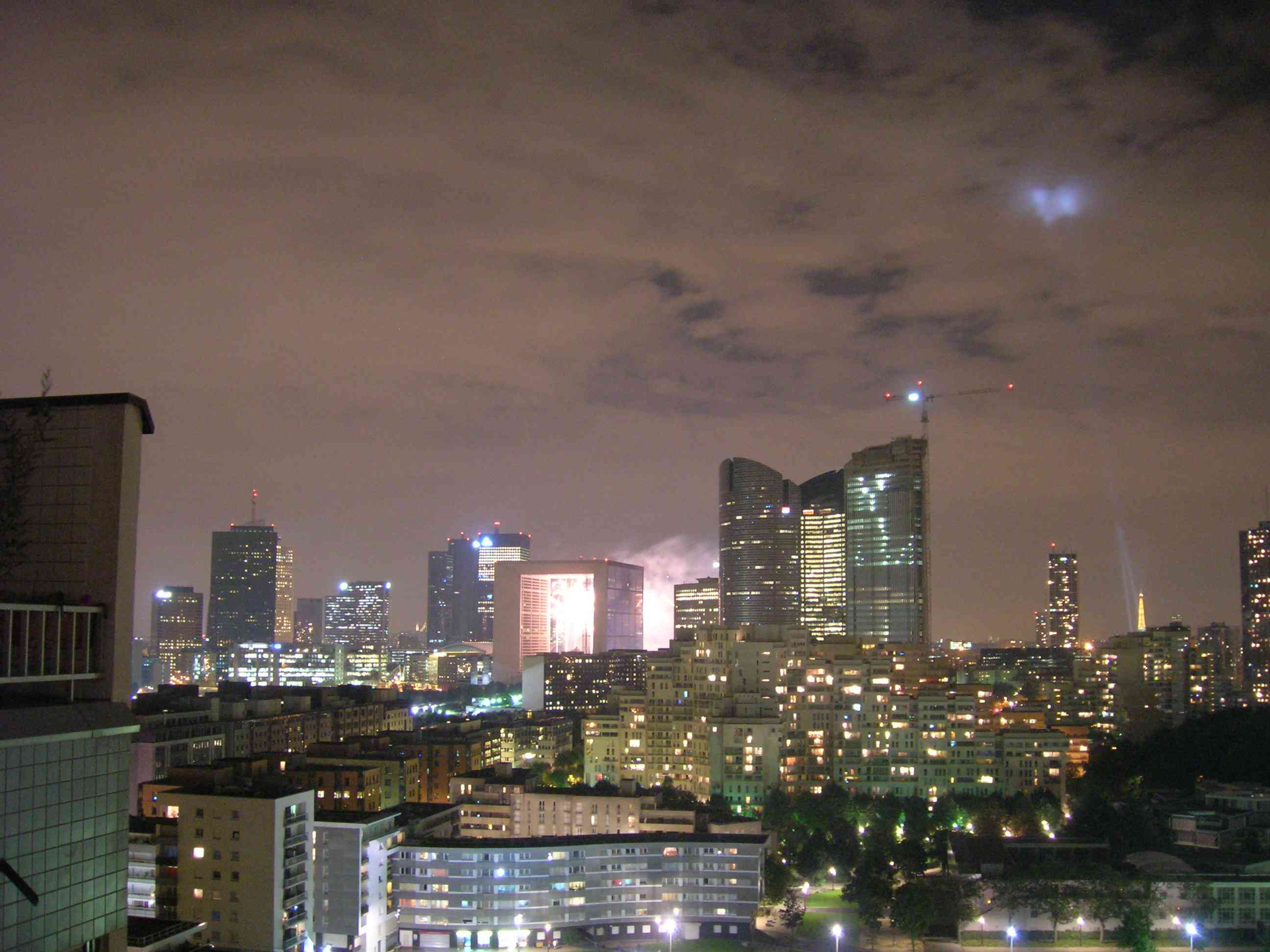
Nanterre

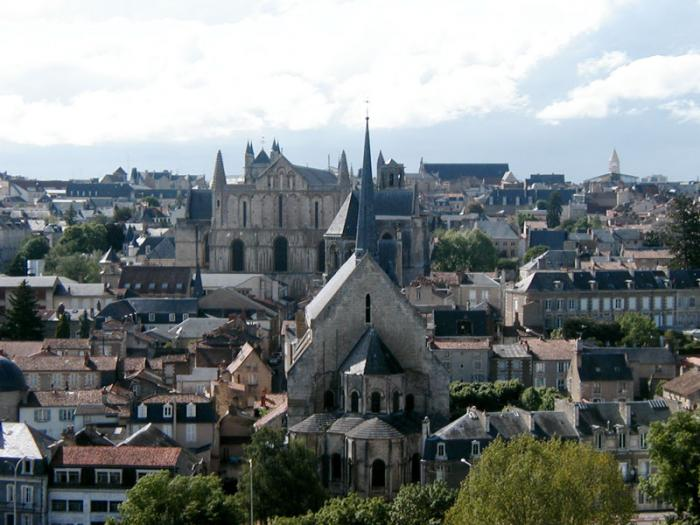
Poitiers

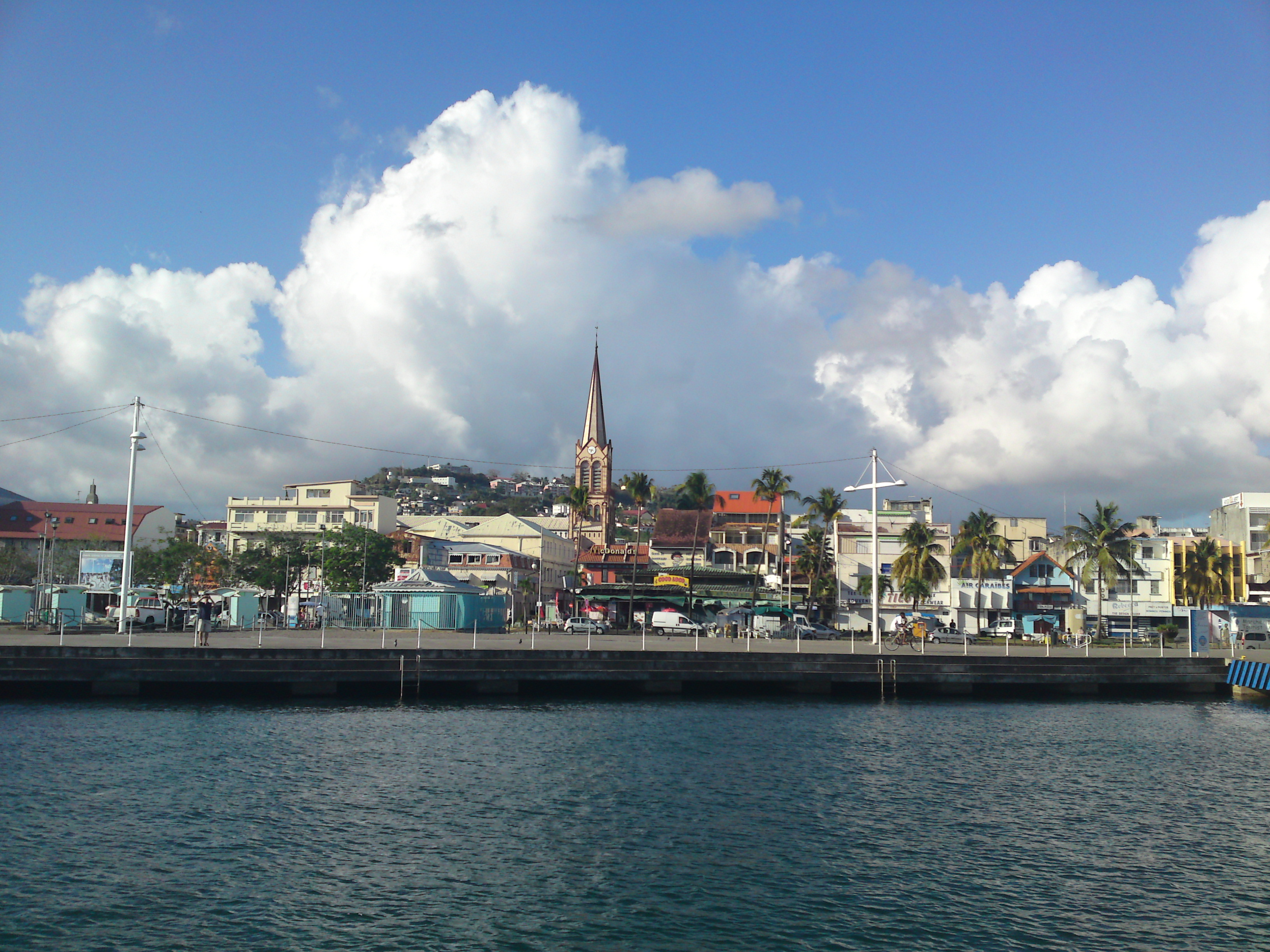
Fort-de-France

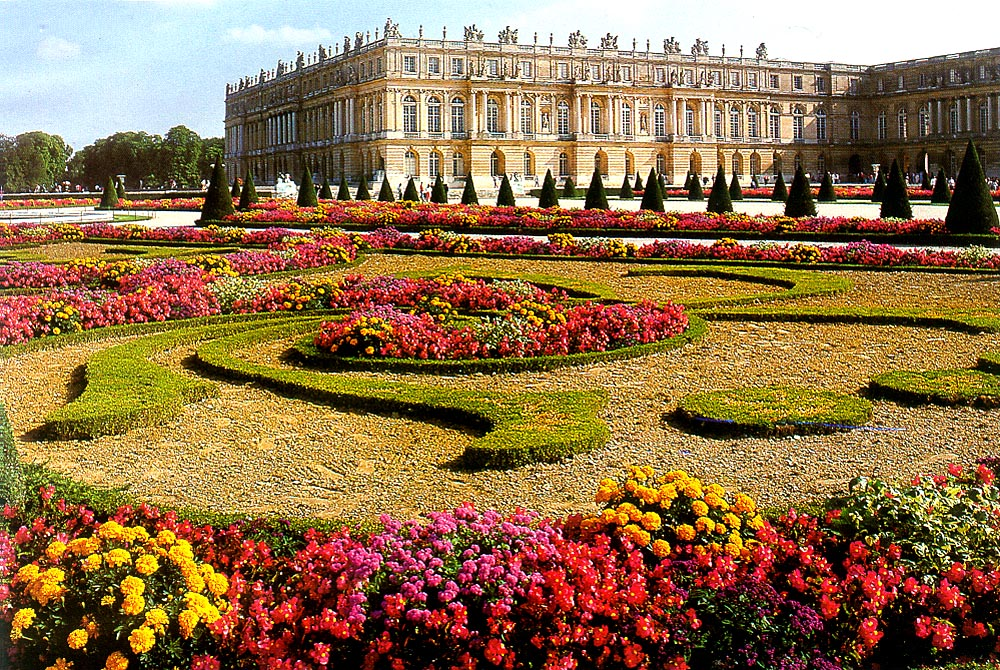
Versailles

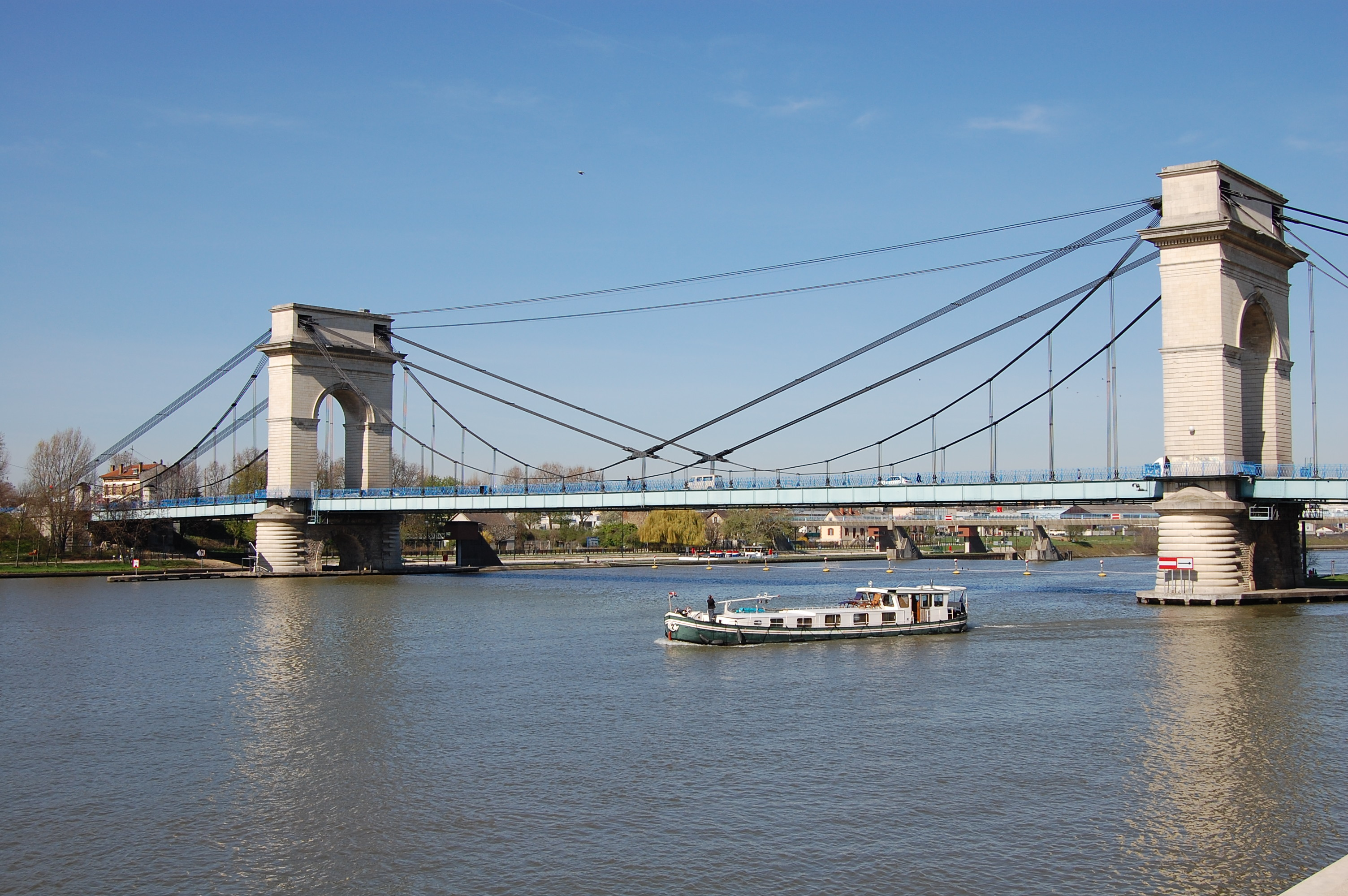
Vitry-sur-Seine

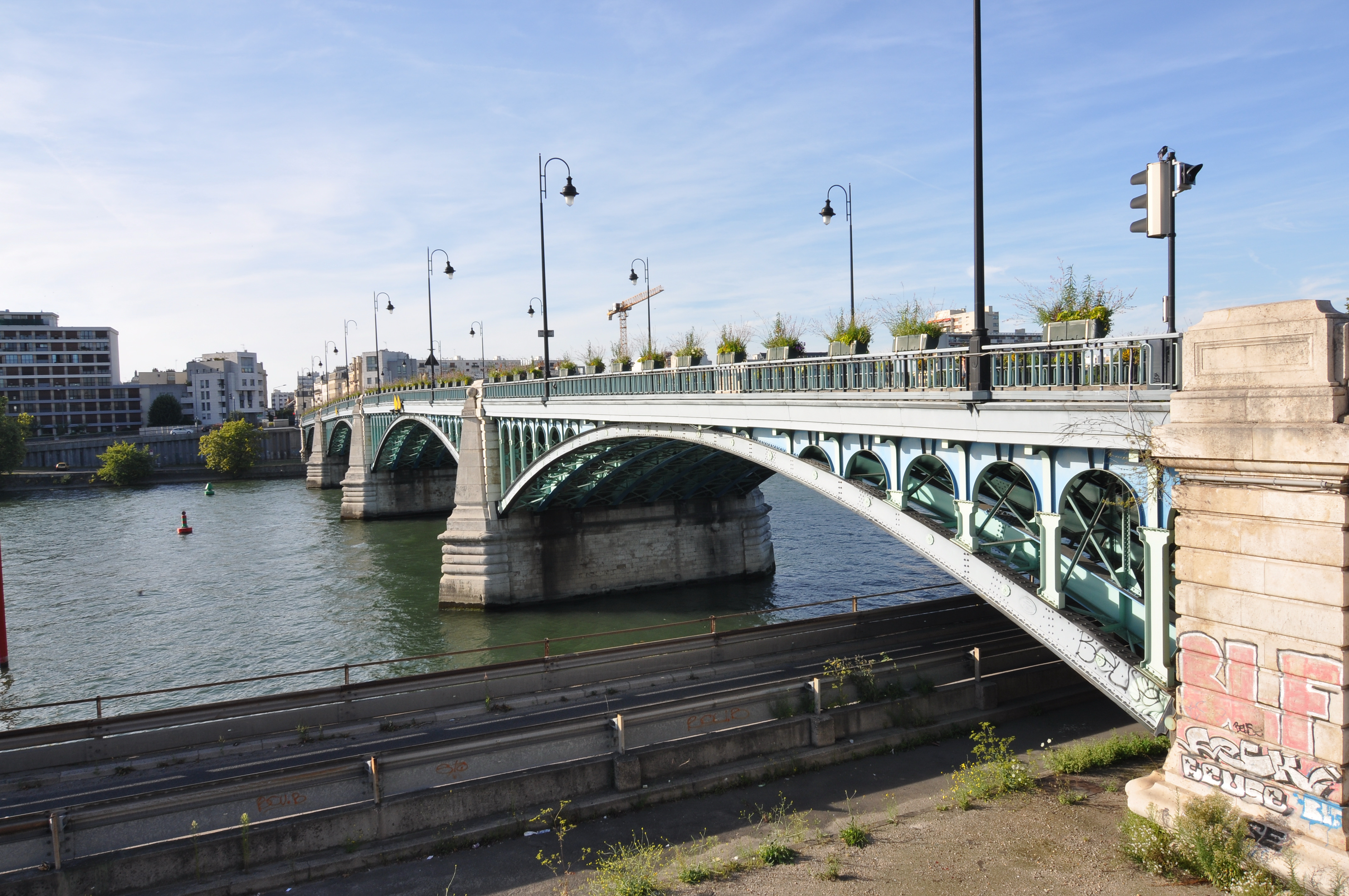
Asnières-sur-Seine

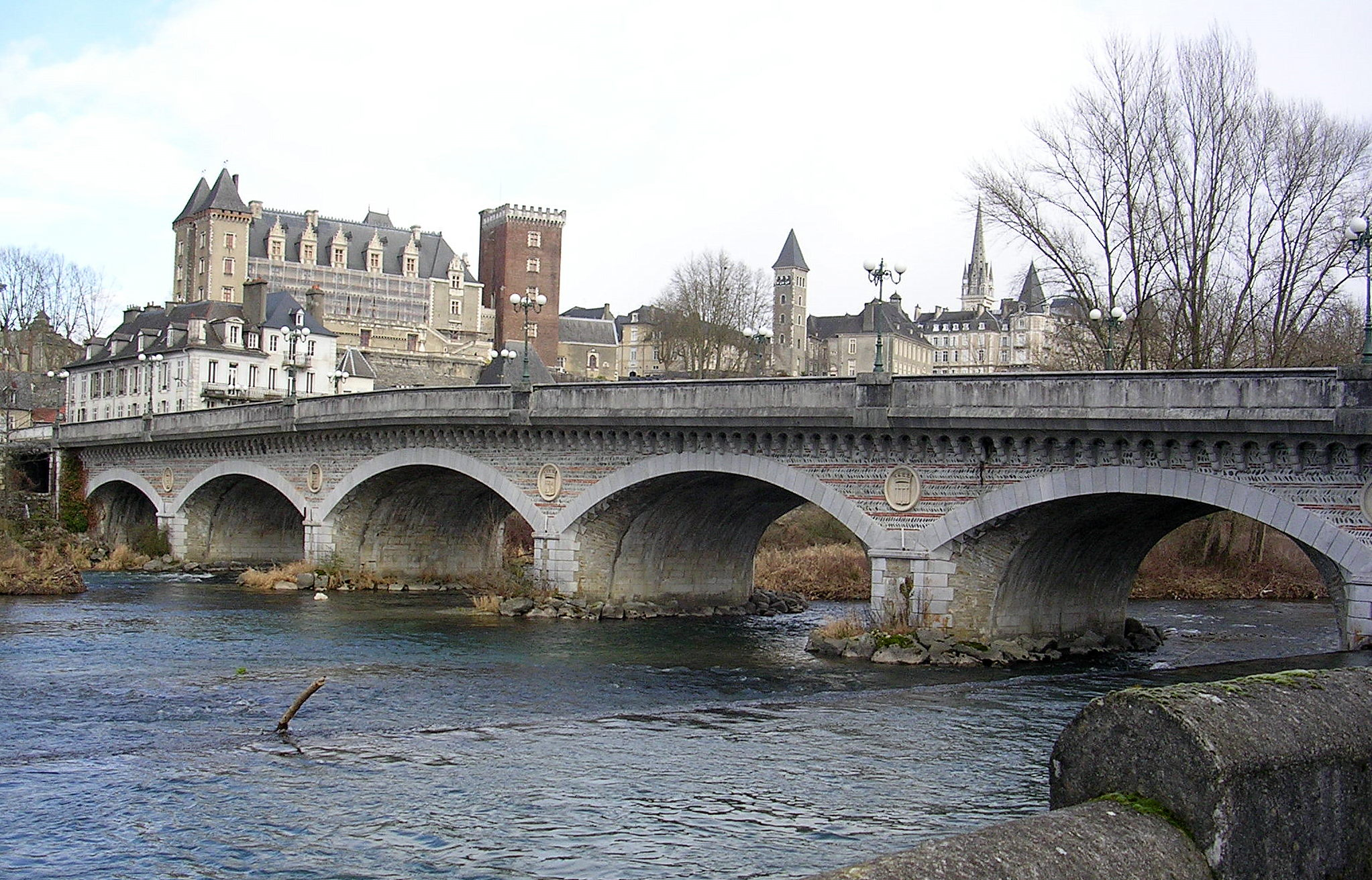
Pau

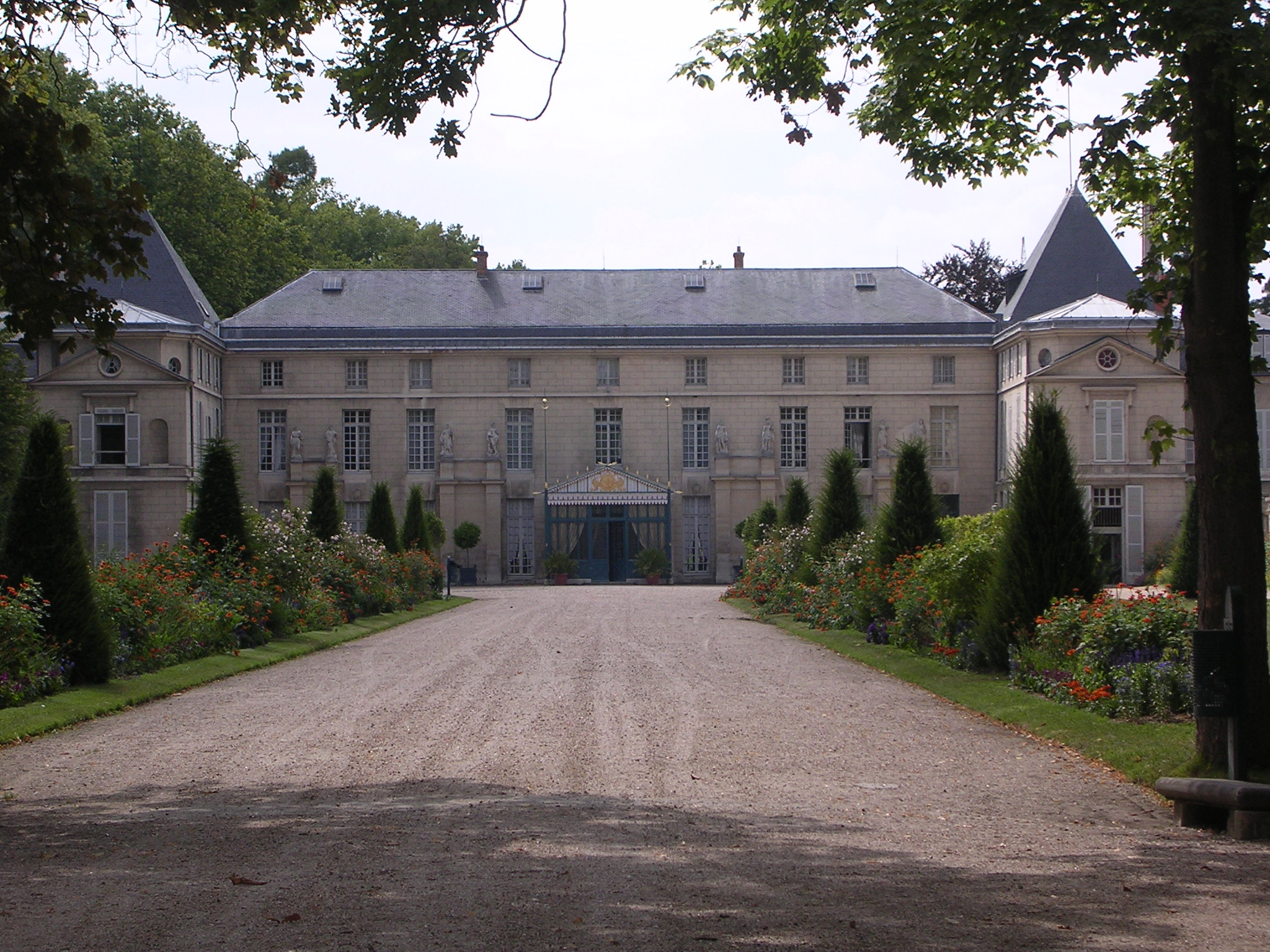
Rueil-Malmaison

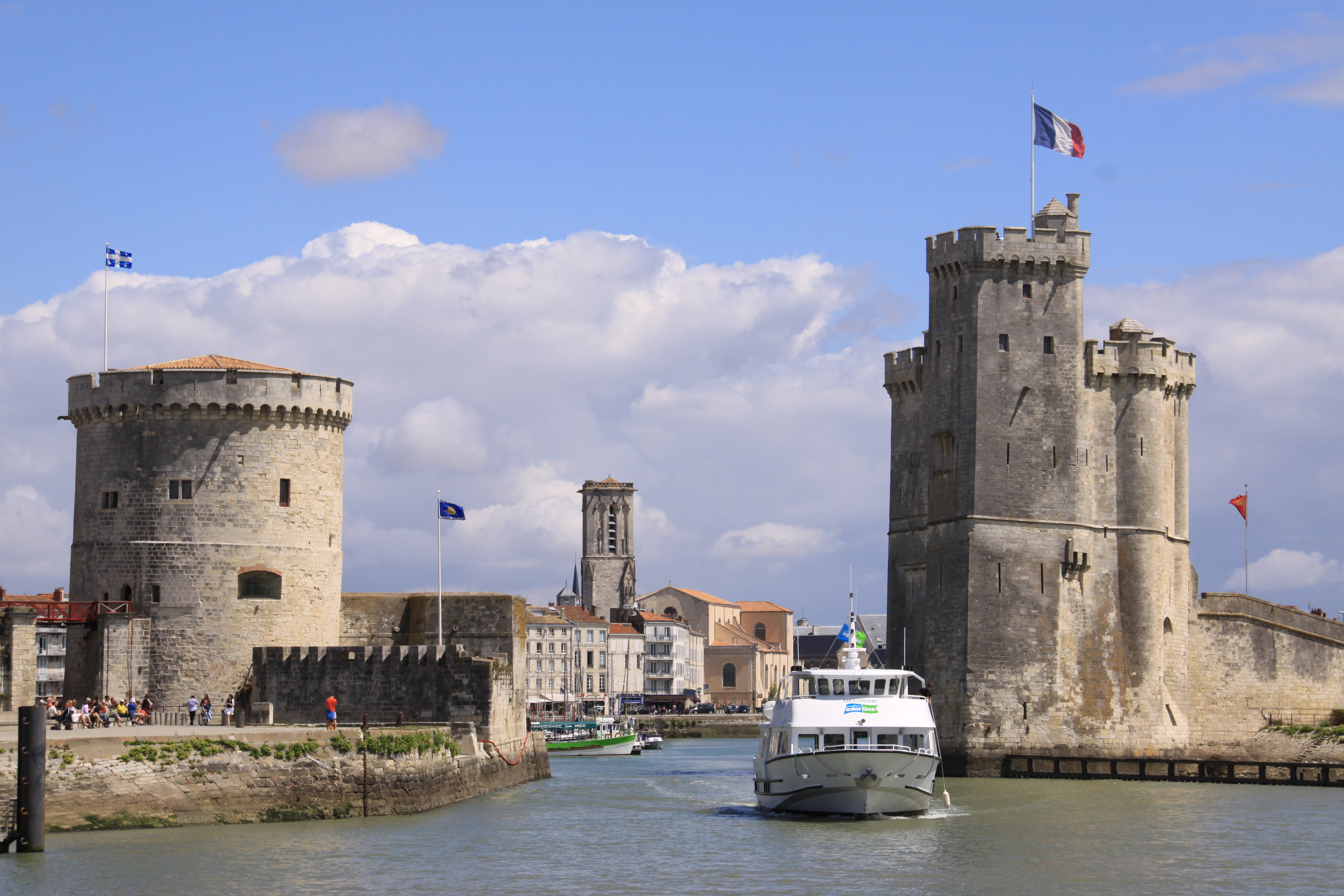
La Rochelle

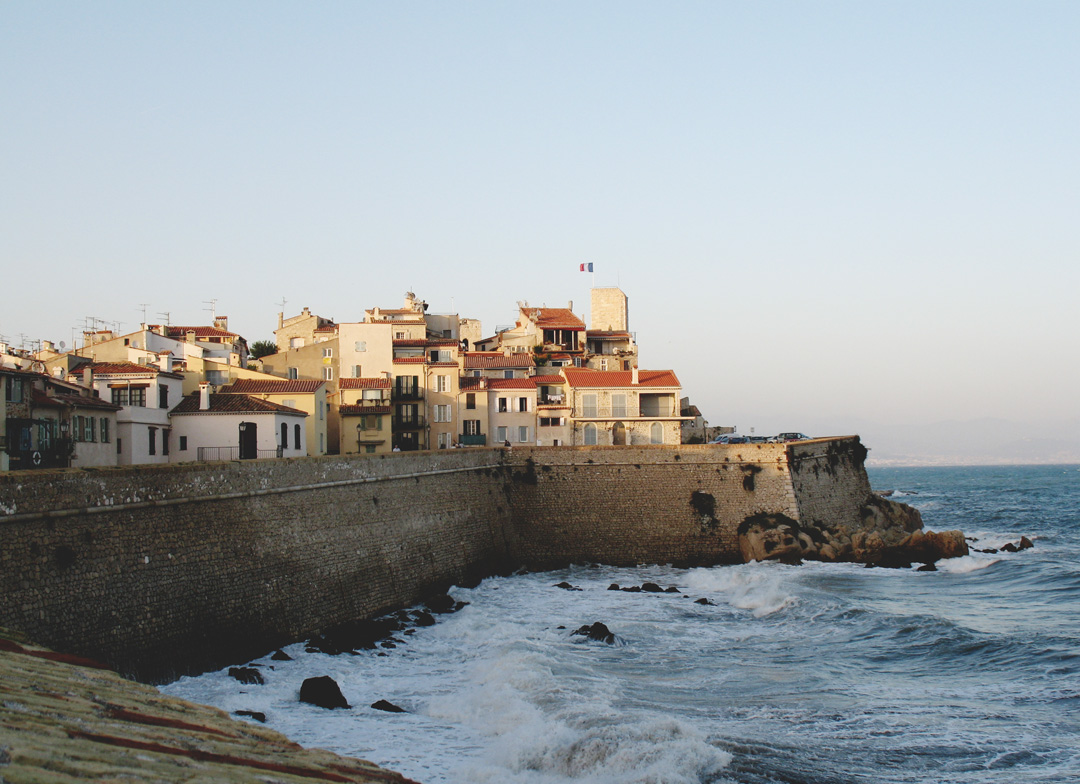
Antibes

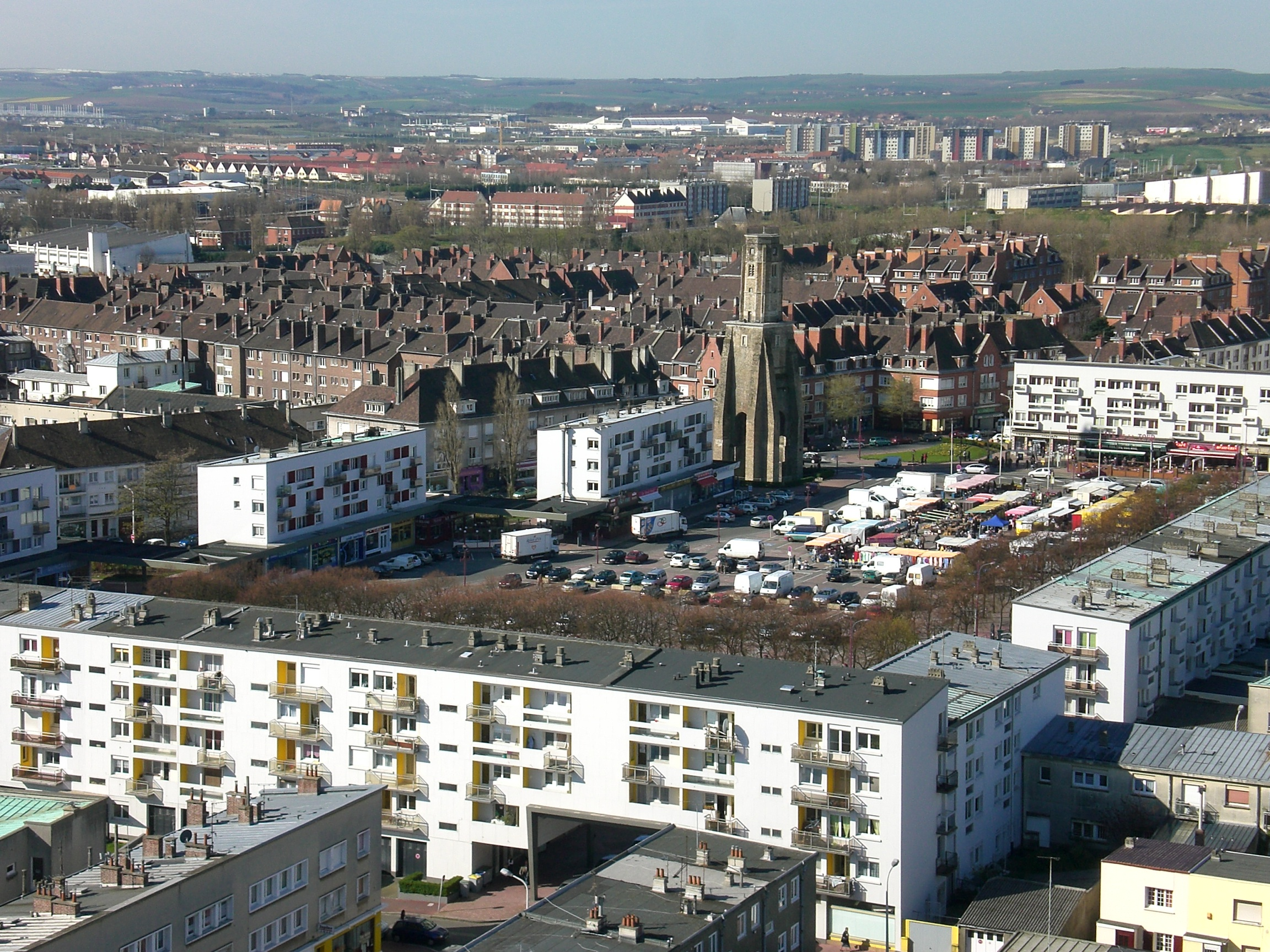
Calais

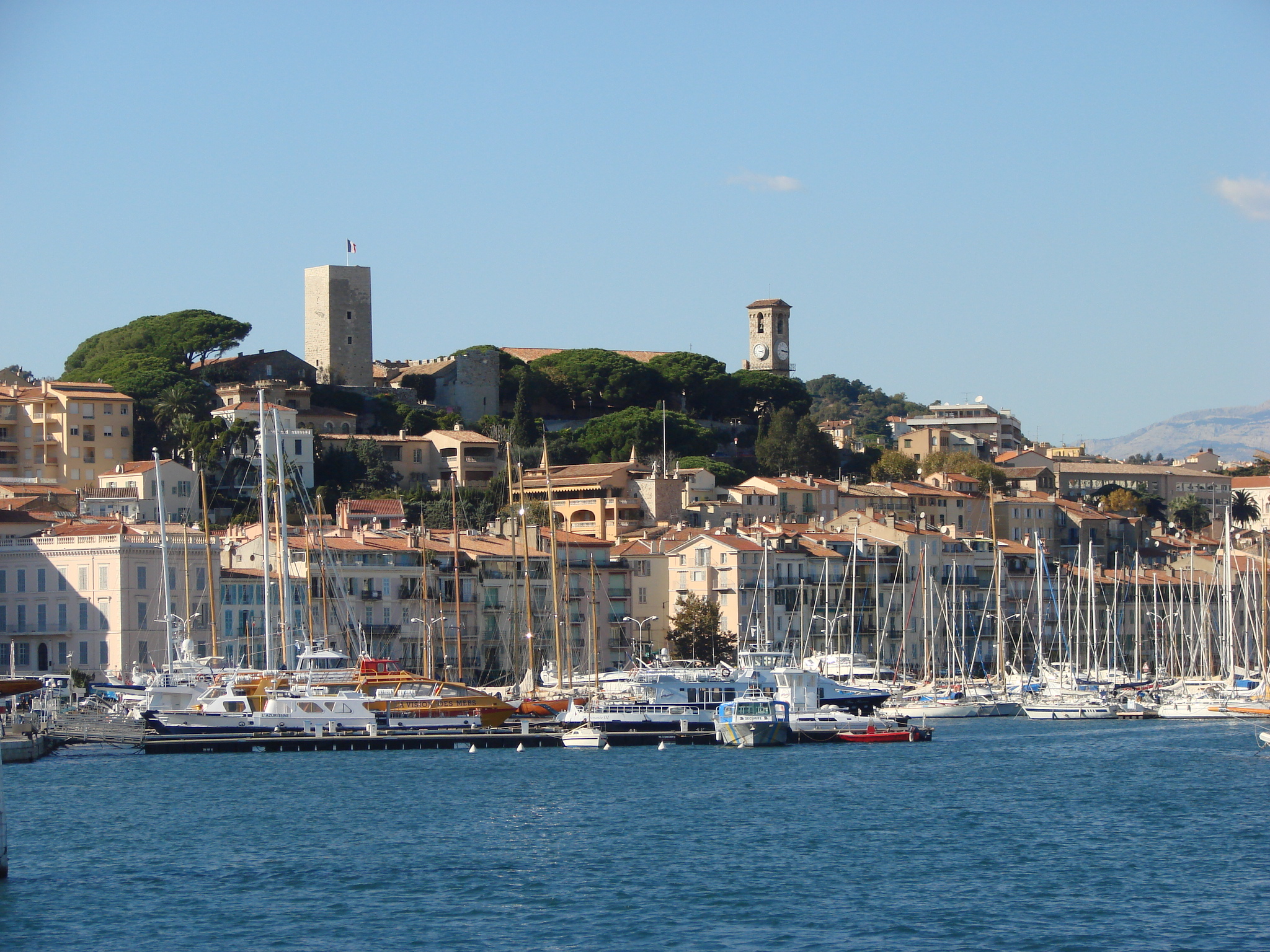
Cannes

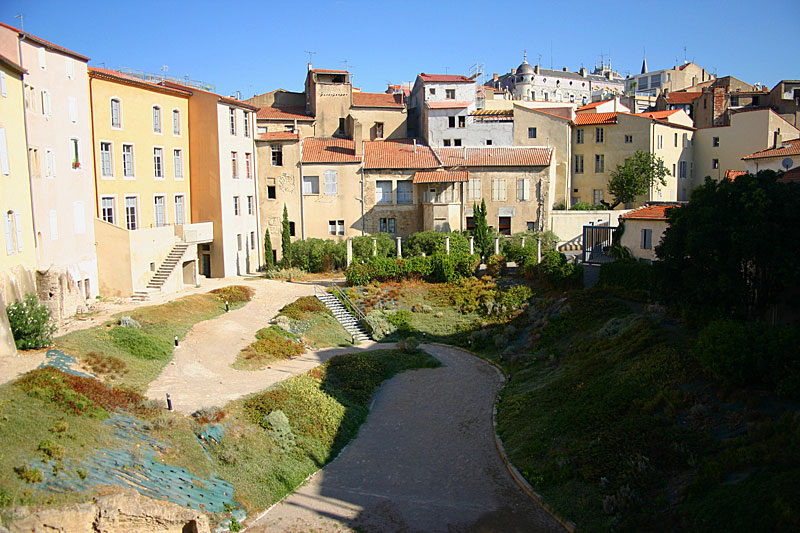
Béziers

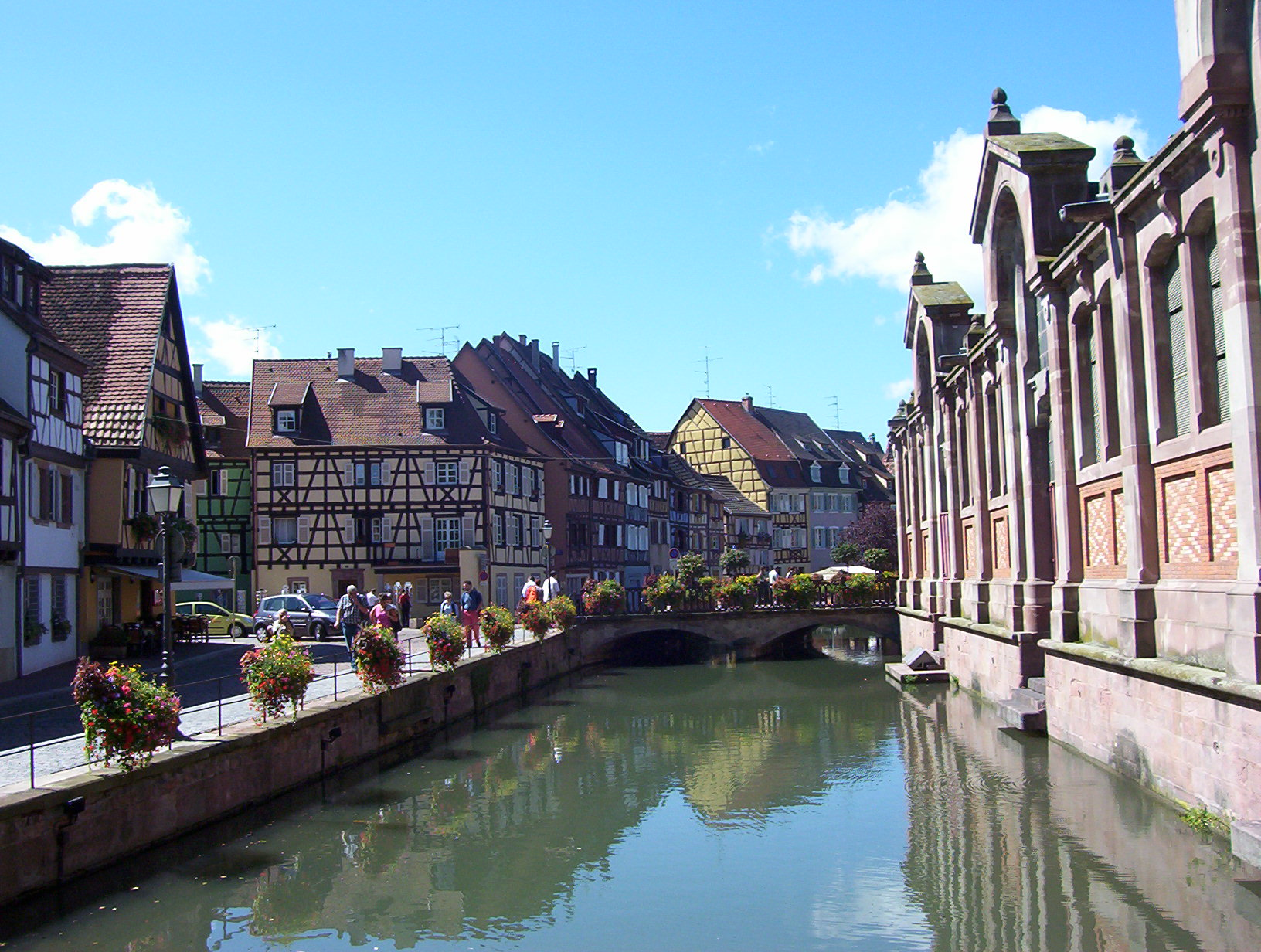
Colmar

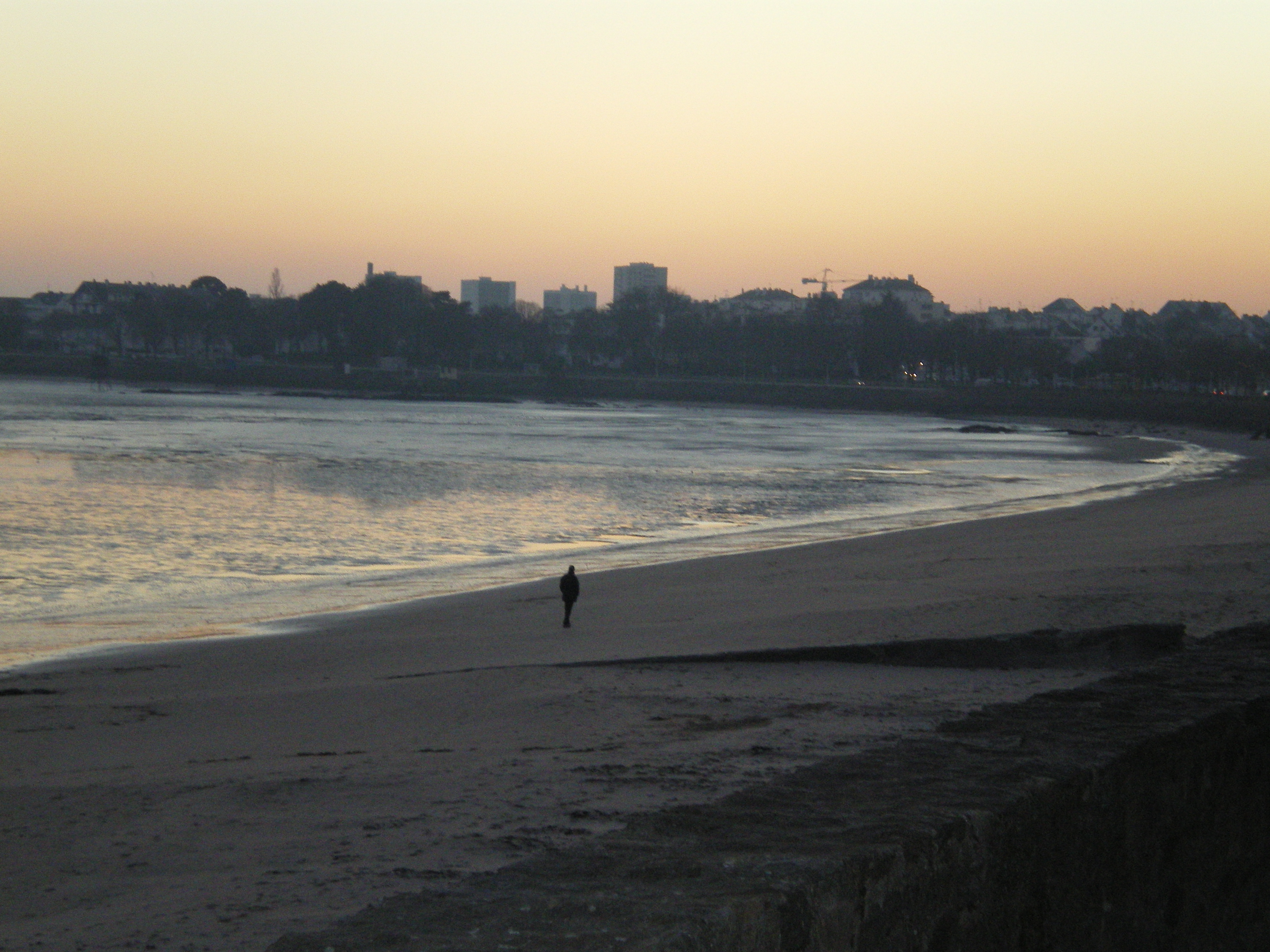
Saint-Nazaire

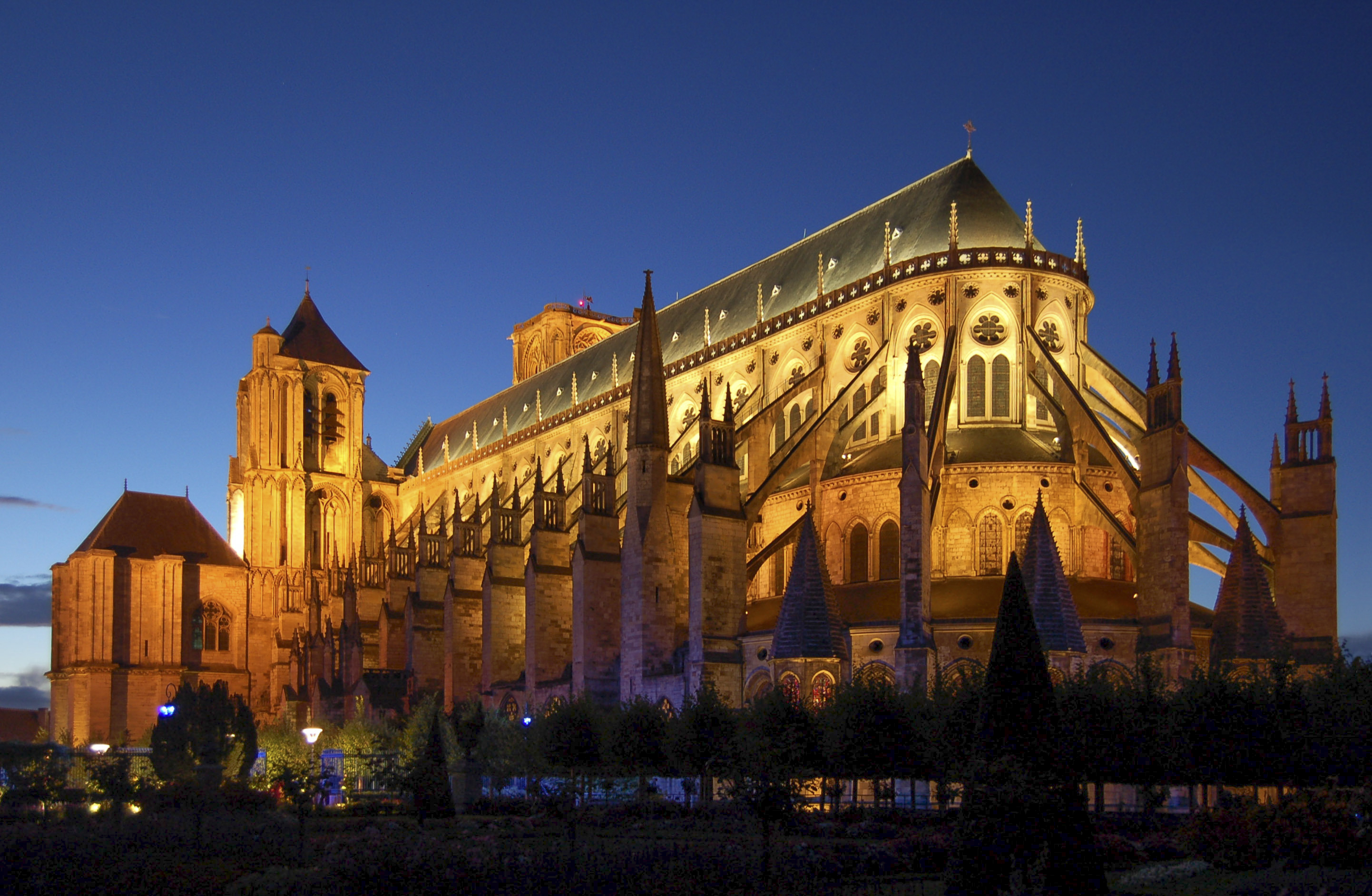
Bourges

== See also ==
- Urban area (France)
- Urban unit (including a list of "urban units" with more than 200,000 inhabitants)
- Lists of communes of France
- List of cities in Europe by country
