= Xtabay =

Female demon in Yucatec Maya folklore

La Xtabay (Spanish pronunciation: [la iʃ.taˈβaj]) is a Yucatec Maya folklore tale about a demonic femme fatale who preys upon men in the Yucatán Peninsula. She is said to dwell in the forest to lure men to their deaths with her incomparable beauty. She is described as having beautiful, shining black hair that falls down to her ankles and wearing a white dress. One of the most accepted versions of the myth comes from a book, Diez Leyendas Mayas (1998), written by Jesus Azcorra Alejos.

== Etymology ==
The term "Xtab" was used to refer to an ancient Maya goddess Ixtab, the goddess of suicide by hanging or the gallows. According to Perez' Lexicon of the Maya Language, "Ix" is the feminine prefix, and "tab", "taab", and "tabil" translate to "rope intended for some exclusive use." Ixtab was seen as a benevolent goddess who acted as a psychopomp to whoever hung themselves, leading them to paradise, as suicide was considered an honorable way of dying.

== The legend of Xtabay ==
=== Background ===
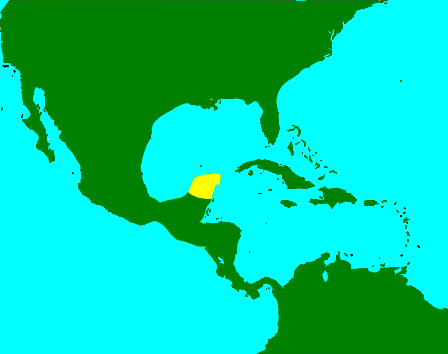
Location of the Yucatán Peninsula

Two equally beautiful women, Xkeban and Utz-colel, lived in a village or pueblo in the Yucatán Peninsula. Sometimes the women are said to be sisters. Xkeban was treated poorly by her community for her promiscuous behavior while Utz-colel was considered virtuous for remaining celibate. The people of the village planned to exile Xkeban, but they decided to allow her to remain in order to further humiliate her. Despite her ill treatment, Xkeban tended to the poor, sick, and animals in need. In contrast to Xkeban, Utz-colel was cold-hearted and believed she was superior to those around her, especially those socially below her. The townspeople adored Utz-colel because of her celibacy and overlooked her cruelty.

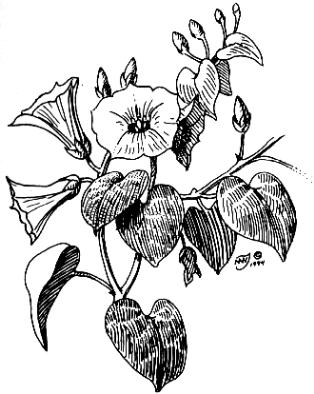
Xtabentún (the fragrant morning glory species Ipomoea corymbosa)

Several days after Xkeban's death, the townspeople discovered her body guarded by animals and surrounded by fragrant flowers. The homeless and poor, whom Xkeban had helped during her life, held a funeral for her and, soon afterward, a mysterious, sweet-smelling flower grew around her grave, for Xkeban had metamorphosed into the species of morning glory called, in the Maya language, xtabentún, (Ipomoea corymbosa (Convolvulaceae)). Xtabentún is a lax, clambering vine that sprawls through hedges, scenting the air with its festoons of delicate white trumpets, and it is said that the reason that it seeks such shelter is that it is defenseless (it has no thorns)—just as Xkeban had felt defenseless when she was human. This flower is used for a liqueur of the same name. Ipomoea corymbosa was also one of the most celebrated entheogens of the Aztecs, who knew the plant under the Nahuatl name coaxihuitl and its psychoactive seeds as ololiúqui ("round things") and, to this day, the seeds are still used to induce healing trances in curing rituals performed by the Zapotecs.

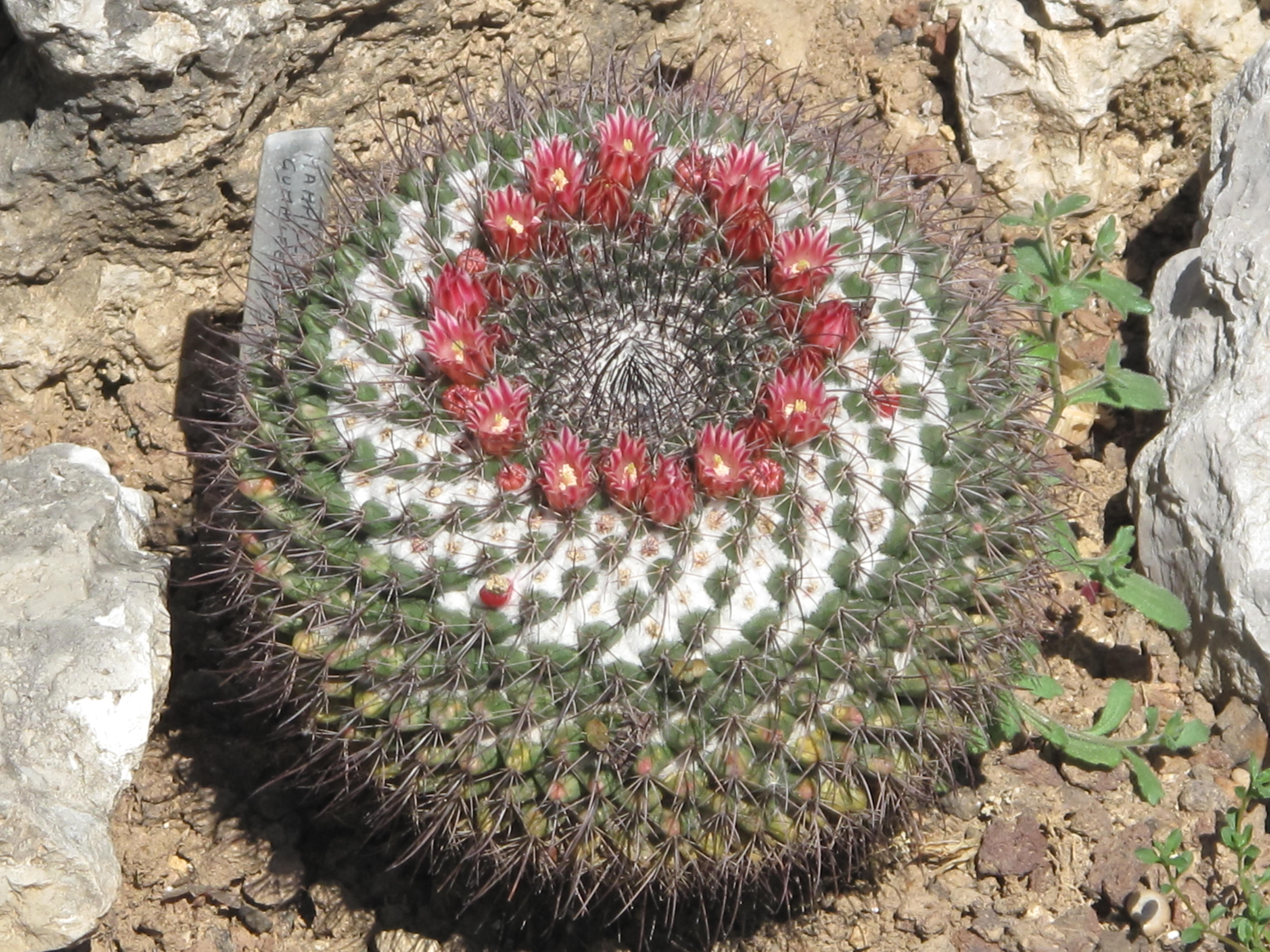
The Tzacam cactus (Mammillaria heyderi), bearing its foul-smelling flowers

Utz-colel haughtily believed that her dead body would smell better than Xkeban's because of her purity; however, her dead body had an unbearable smell. The entire pueblo gathered for her funeral, and they put flowers around her grave that disappeared the next day. Utz-colel became the foul-smelling flower of the Tzacam cactus (Mammillaria columbiana ssp. yucatanensis or Mammillaria heyderi ssp. gaumeri). Utz-colel prayed to evil spirits who fulfilled her desire to become a woman again so that she too might become a beautiful flower in death, but, incapable of love and motivated only by jealousy and rage, she became instead the demon Xtabay, outwardly a beautiful woman but inwardly cruel and predatory of heart.

=== Modern legend ===
Xtabay is said to wear a white dress and to have large black eyes and long black hair down to her ankles which she uses to attract men who are out late at night. She waits behind a ceiba tree (a sacred tree in Maya culture) and is said to comb her hair with the spines of the Tzacam cactus. She lures men deep into the forest, making them lost and disoriented before having sex with them. Once they have had sex, Xtabay transforms into a poisonous serpent and devours them. In other versions of the myth, the Xtabay can appear in any form or sex she chooses in order to lure a person to their doom. Xtabay will lie in wait under a tree to seduce her victim before throwing them over a cliff and finally ripping out their heart.

An alternative version of the legend, particularly in Quintana Roo, states that Xtabay is the punisher of drunks, thieves, and violent criminals.

== Moral of the legend ==
Despite her promiscuous nature and the resulting ill-treatment by her community, Xkeban helped those around her, which ultimately made her worthy of being transformed into the xtabentún flower. In contrast, Utz-colel believed she was virtuous because of her sexual purity and her community’s resulting kind treatment, but was also haughty and unkind to the downtrodden. The moral of the legend is that celibacy and outward virtue can lead the unwary into the sin of pride and count for little unless governed by a kind heart (inner beauty) capable of compassion for those less fortunate than oneself.

== Symbolism ==
=== Death ===
The theme of death is continuous with all of the different versions of the myth of the Xtabay. The fear of death in the myth relies on the capability of the dead to cause harm to the living and the belief that the dead have hostile intentions.

=== The heart and love ===
In La Xtabay, the symbolism of the human heart is often repeated throughout the myth, as both Xkeban's and Utz-colel's personalities are described based on the type of "heart" they possessed. Xkeban had a warm heart whereas Utz-colel had a cold heart. Even in death, when Utz-colel wanted to experience life again, she was unable to overcome her envy and loveless heart.

=== The ceiba tree ===
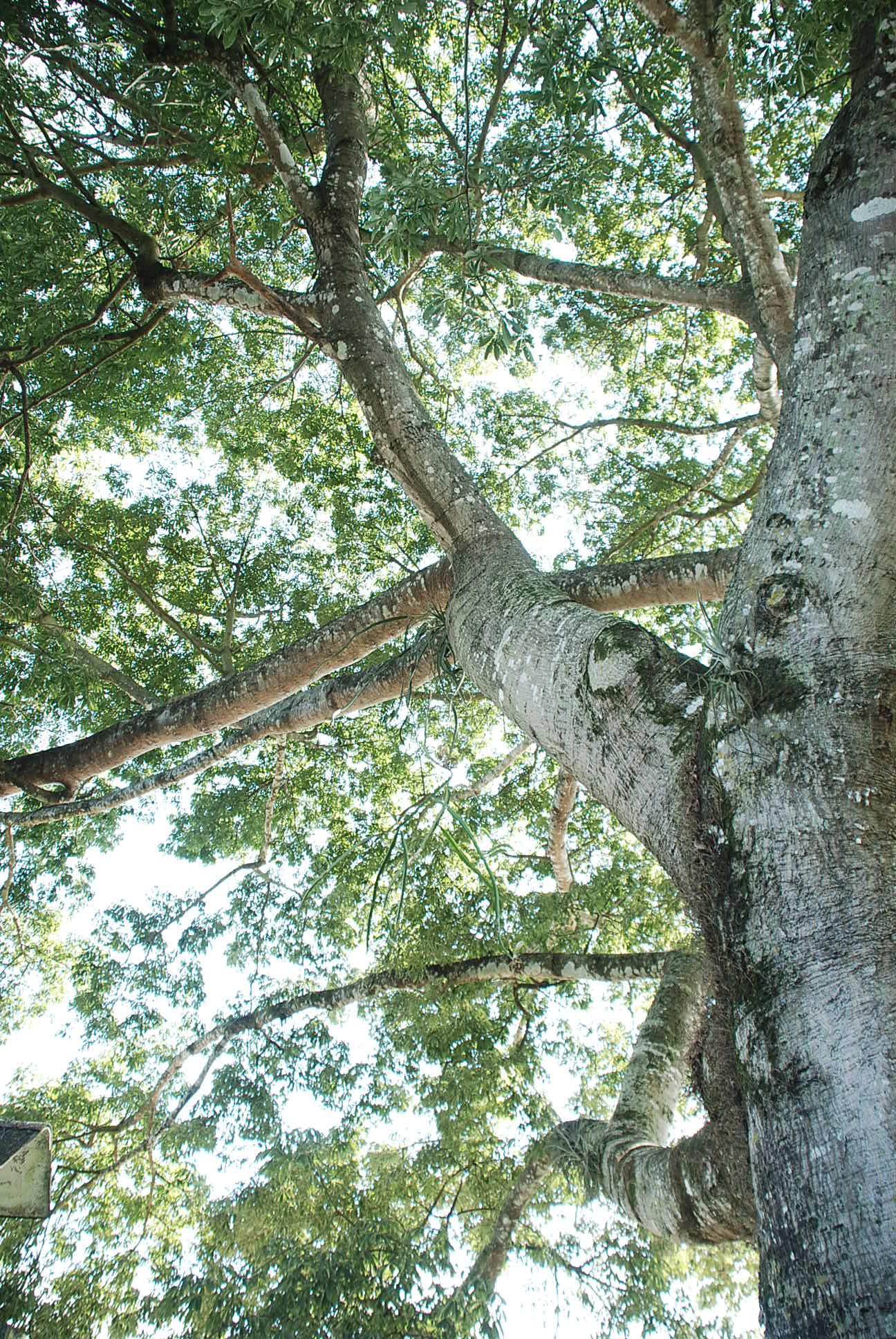
Xtabay is said to loiter at the foot of the sacred ceiba tree to lure men to their doom.

The ceiba tree is a sacred tree of the Mayan people since the belief was that a virtuous person could become a ceiba tree after death. The ceiba tree is considered to be an embodiment of the Axis mundi, connecting heaven, earth and underworld. Xtabay subverts the traditional meaning of the ceiba tree since she hides behind it to lure her victims to their doom. It said in the legend that the ceiba roots are where all the men the Xtabay has taken from earth go and that not a single one has ever returned from them. It has been suggested that Christian colonialists corrupted the original legend by altering the meaning of the ceiba tree from a sacred tree into a place of danger.

=== Long black hair ===
The Xtabay is known for her long black hair falling past her shoulders that she combs with the spines of the tzacam cactus. Mayan culture places great importance on keeping hair long and healthy, however, humid weather and long work days make this difficult, so the hair of working women is usually kept drawn back from the face. Xtabay's hair contrasts the typical hairstyle of Mayan women but represents the culture's ideal of beauty.

=== Sexuality ===
Utz-colel was known for her purity because she abstained from sexual relations. In Mayan culture, women are encouraged to be modest and abstain from sexual intercourse until marriage. Women symbolize purity and are taught not to talk to men by themselves. If a Mayan woman does not follow these cultural expectations, she can be condemned for her actions. Xkeban was shamed and humiliated by her community because she did not follow the traditional expectation for woman's behaviour. Xtabay lures men with seduction, which is against the traditional Mayan culture.

== Legacy ==
The legend of Xtabay is part of contemporary Maya culture, as myths influence current beliefs. In the Yucatán peninsula, the word Xtabay illustrates undesirable behavior in women and men, and the legend is used by mothers and grandmothers to inculcate good behaviour in children. The myth also serves as a warning against the dangers of marital infidelity in the modern world, Xtabay's victims being generally husbands who have ventured from their homes at night to drink alcohol and seek the attention of other women. The myth is used by both parents and grandparents to impress early upon the young the need to resist the temptations they will face in adulthood to go out drinking at night and cheat on their partners.

The legend of the Xtabay has influenced music. Les Baxter's album Voice of the Xtabay by Peruvian soprano Yma Sumac depicts the lure of the xtabay in her music.

In the Mexican animated film Nikté released on 2009, Xtabay appears to function as an antagonist who actually sets tests for the characters that they must overcome.

In the 2013 video game Guacamelee!, the player encounters a recurring enemy character explicitly named "X'tabay" whose appearance generally matches descriptions of the mythological figure.

== Similarity to other folktales ==
Xtabay has been compared to the Churel of Indian folklore.

There are many similarities to the legend of La Llorona, a ghost who is said to wander Mexico searching for her children and luring away any living children she comes across. Variants of the Llorona legend are told throughout Mexico and because of the Llorona figure can be pitied and feared at the same time. Throughout all of the versions, the Llorona figure is known as "the white lady" because she wears white. Legends similar to La Llorona include La Malinche and La Xtabay. La Malinche was said to have three sons by three different men, and she drowned her three lovers, but now is cursed to look for them along the rivers and call to them endlessly. People who look at La Malinche have their necks stuck in the position in which they looked at her and must be cured by a curandero (healer).
