= Lycée Albert Camus =

Lycée Albert Camus may refer to:

- Lycée français Albert Camus, a French secondary school in Conakry, Guinea
- Lycée Albert Camus (Bois-Colombes), a French senior high school in Bois-Colombes, Hauts-de-Seine, France
- Lycée Albert Camus, a French high school in Nantes, France
