= Nicole Maurey =

French actress (1925–2016)

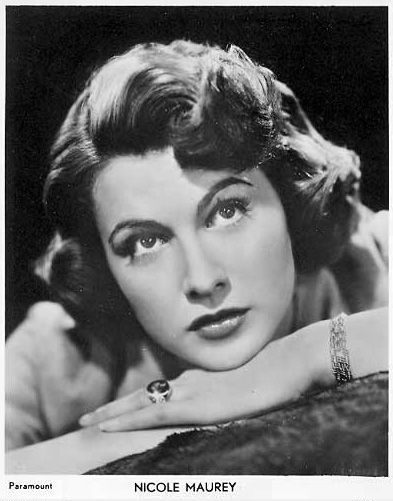
- Born: 20 December 1925; Bois-Colombes, Hauts-de-Seine, Île-de-France, France
- Died: 11 March 2016 (aged 90); Versailles, France
- Years active: 1945–1997
- Spouse: Jacques L. Gallo (1950–1960)

Nicole Maurey (20 December 1925 – 11 March 2016) was a French actress, who appeared in 65 film and television productions between 1945 and 1997.

== Life and career ==
Born in Bois-Colombes, a northwestern suburb of Paris, Maurey was originally a dancer before being cast in her first film role in 1944.

In 1953 Maurey appeared opposite Bing Crosby in Little Boy Lost that was filmed in France. The following year Universal-International brought Nicole Maurey from France, Gia Scala from Italy and Myriam Verbeeck from Belgium to the United States to test for the role of Mary Magdelene in an unproduced Biblical epic The Galileans. She remains most noted as Charlton Heston's leading lady in Secret of the Incas (1954), often cited as the primary inspiration for Raiders of the Lost Ark (1981). She starred in films with Alec Guinness, Bette Davis, Bing Crosby, Jeff Chandler, Fess Parker, Rex Harrison, Robert Taylor and Mickey Rooney, among numerous others. She was the leading lady in the original 1962 science fiction cult film The Day of the Triffids. Later in life, she moved into television, appearing in various made-for-TV movies and mini-series.

== Personal life ==
She was married to Jacques Gallo.

== Death ==
Maurey died in March 2016 at the age of 90.

== Filmography ==
- The Black Cavalier (1945) as Solange
- Pamela (1945) as Mme Royale
- Blondine (1945) as Blondine
- La bataille du feu (1949) as Anne-Marie
- Diary of a Country Priest (1951) as Mlle Louise
- Rendezvous in Grenada (1951) Manina
- The Last Robin Hood (1953) as Isabelle Delorme
- Operation Magali (1953) as Manon
- Les Compagnes de la nuit (1953) as Yvonne Leriche
- L'oeil en coulisse (1953) as Annette Durand
- Little Boy Lost (1953) as Lisa Garret
- The Most Wanted Man (1953) as Peggy
- Royal Affairs in Versailles (1954) as Mademoiselle de Fontanges
- Secret of the Incas (1954) as Elena Antonescu
- Napoléon (1955) as Mme Tallien
- The Constant Husband (1955) as Lola
- The Bold and the Brave (1956) as Fiamma
- The Weapon (1956) as Vivienne
- Missing Persons Section (1956) as Diana Lander
- Action immédiate (1957) as Diana Rossi
- Rogue's Yarn (1957) as Michele Cartier
- Me and the Colonel (1958) as Suzanne Roualet
- The Scapegoat (1959) as Bela
- The Jayhawkers! (1959) (aka Violence au Kansas) as Jeanne Dubois
- The House of the Seven Hawks (1959) as Constanta Sluiter
- High Time (1960) as Prof. Helene Gauthier
- His and Hers (1961) as Simone Rolfe
- Don't Bother to Knock (1961) as Lucille
- The Day of the Triffids (1963) as Christine Durrant
- The Very Edge (1963) as Helen
- Pleins feux sur Stanislas (1965) as Claire
- Sale temps pour les mouches (1966) as Eva Delagrange
- Gloria (1977) as Alice
- Chanel Solitaire (1981) as Grande Dame

=== Television ===
- The Ford Television Theatre (1955, Episode: "Tomorrow We'll Love") as Denise
- Casablanca (1955, Episode: "Black Market Operation") as Denise
- Avatar (1964, TV Movie)
- Rouletabille (1966, Episode: "Le parfum de la dame en noir") as Mathilde Stengerson
- La Morale de l'histoire (1966, TV Movie) as Thérèse
- Champion House (1967) as Michele Champion
- Noëlle aux quatre vents (1970) as Lisette Andrieux
- Mon seul amour (1971) as Claude
- La Demoiselle d'Avignon (1972, TV Movie) as Nicole
- Les Évasions célèbres (1972) as Mme de Boislinard
- Le grillon du foyer (1972, TV Movie) as Dot
- La vie et la passion de Dodin-Bouffant (1972, TV Movie) as Pauline
- Au théâtre ce soir (1972, Episode: "Histoire d'un détective") as Mary McLaren
- Les nuits de la colère (1973, TV Movie) as Louise
- Le provocateur (1973) as Gisèle Charmoy
- Une atroce petite musique (1973, TV Movie) as Irène Musselet
- Marie Dorval (1973, TV Movie) as Mademoiselle Mars
- Les écrivains (1973, TV Movie) as Eve
- Joseph Balsamo (1973, TV Mini-Series) as Frau Grammont (uncredited)
- Lucien Leuwen (1973-1974, TV Mini-Series) as Mme Leuwen
- Au théâtre ce soir (1974, Episode: "Le procès de Mary Dugan") as Mme Rice
- La passagère (1974, TV Movie) as Catherine Caron
- Comme du bon pain (1976, TV Mini-Series) as Madeleine Rivard
- La lune papa (1977, TV Mini-Series) as Mme Marchandou
- La vie des autres (1980) as Blanche
- Sunday Night Thriller (1981, Episode: "I Thought They Died Years Ago") as Eliane Label
- Marianne, une étoile pour Napoléon (1983) as Princesse de Benevent
- Les Cinq Dernières Minutes (1983) as Gertrude Necken
- Rouge Marine (1983) as Gertrude Necken
- Coulisses (1986) as Sabine Corval

== Theatre ==
- 1952: Harvey by Mary Chase, director Marcel Achard, Théâtre Antoine
- 1964: La Preuve par quatre written and directed by Félicien Marceau, Théâtre de la Michodière
