= Canton of Colombes-2 =

Administrative division of Hauts-de-Seine, France

Coordinates: 48.91°N 2.24°E

Colombes-2
- Canton
- Location of the canton of Colombes-2 in the Hauts-de-Seine department.
- Country: France
- Region: Île-de-France
- Department: Hauts-de-Seine
- No. of communes: {{{nbcomm}}}
- Established: 2015

Government
  - Representatives (2021–2028): Isabelle Caullery; Yves Revillon (LR)
- Population (2023): 72,601
- INSEE code: 92 11

The canton of Colombes-2 is an administrative division of the Hauts-de-Seine department, in northern France. It was created at the French canton reorganisation which came into effect in March 2015. Its seat is in Colombes.

== Political representation ==
List of successive departmental councillors from the Canton of Colombes-2
Electoral period		In office		Name	Party	Capacity
2015	2021	2015	2021	Isabelle Caullery	LR	Deputy mayor of La Garenne-Colombes; General Councillor of the Canton of La Garenne-Colombes (2010—2015); Knight of the Legion of Honour
2015	2021	2015	2021	Yves Révillon	LR	Mayor of Bois-Colombes (1995—present); General Councillor of the Canton of Bois-Colombes (2001—2015)
2021	2028	2021	Incumbent	Isabelle Caullery	LR	Deputy mayor of La Garenne-Colombes; General Councillor of the Canton of La Garenne-Colombes (2010—2015); Knight of the Legion of Honour
2021	2028	2021	Incumbent	Yves Révillon	LR	Mayor of Bois-Colombes (1995—present); General Councillor of the Canton of Bois-Colombes (2001—2015)

== Composition ==
List of communes of the canton of Colombes-2 on 1 January 2021
Name	Code INSEE	Intercommunality	Area (km^{2})	Population (2019)	Density (per km^{2})
Colombes (Seat)	92025	Métropole du Grand Paris	7.81	13,373 (Commune: 86,534)	11,080
Bois-Colombes	92009	Métropole du Grand Paris	1.92	28,841	15,021
La Garenne-Colombes	92035	Métropole du Grand Paris	1.78	29,642	16,653
Canton of Colombes-2	92 11			71,856	

The canton of Colombes-2 consists of the following communes:

1. The entirety of the communes of Bois-Colombes and La Garenne-Colombes.
2. The part of the commune of Colombes not included in the Canton of Colombes-1, consisting of mostly the neighbourhoods of la Petite Garenne and Les Vallées.
