= Françoise Kayler =

French food critic and journalist

- Born: 1930; Bois-Colombes, France
- Died: 24 April 2010 (aged 79–80); Montreal, Quebec, Canada
- Occupations: Journalist, food critic, dietician
- Years active: 1961–2006
- Employer: La Presse
- Awards: Albert Desjardins Medal (1994)

Françoise Kayler (? in Bois-Colombes, a suburb of Paris, France – 24 April 2010, in Montreal, Quebec, Canada) was a journalist and food critic. She wrote for La Presse for more than forty years and was the most-prominent culinary critic of Quebec.

== Biography ==
In 1951 Kayler married Jean Vaillancourt, a Québécoise journalist at La Presse. When he died ten years later, Kayler gained employment with the same newspaper. In 1964 she began creating a page on food. Initially, this involved food in general, involving recipes and reports on agriculture. After a few years she started writing culinary reviews. She helped to promote a culture of good eating. Her reviews sometimes brought death threats, and to preserve her anonymity she wore a wig and faced away from the camera for television interviews. Kayler became the most prominent culinary and gastronomic critic of Quebec.

After retirement, Kayler continued writing about food in the blog Gastronote. She sat on a number of committees to promote local restaurateurs, producers and regional products. Kayler died in her sleep at the age of 80. In March 2011 the Quebec Institute of Tourism and Hospitality (ITHQ) inaugurated a room in her honour. The foundation of the ITHQ awards a Françoise Kayler scholarship for cooking and sommelier students.
