= Voice of the Xtabay =

Studio album by Yma Sumac
- Released: 1950
- Recorded: 1950
- Genre: Exotica; pop
- Label: Capitol
- Producer: Les Baxter

Yma Sumac chronology
Voice of the Xtabay (1950)	Legend of the Sun Virgin (1951)

Voice of the Xtabay is the first studio album by Peruvian soprano Yma Sumac. It was released in 1950 by Capitol Records. It was produced and composed by Les Baxter, along with Moisés Vivanco and John Rose. Sumac sings on the album, accompanied by ethnic percussion and musical variations influenced by the music of Peru. Sumac had a notable vocal range, of about five octaves.

The album entered several Billboard charts on the year of its release.

The songs "Virgin of the Sun God", "High Andes!" and "Earthquake" were used in the 1954 film Secret of the Incas, which featured Sumac as Kori-Tica.

The album was reissued in the UK in 1956 with different artwork.

The album quickly sold 500,000 copies, and was No. 1 on Variety's best-seller list at the end of 1950, surpassing albums by Bing Crosby and Ethel Merman. The album sold one million copies in 1950 alone.

== Track listing ==
Standard edition
No.	Title	Writer(s)	Length
1.	"Virgin of the Sun God (Taita Inty)"	Moisés Vivanco	3:06
2.	"Lure of the Unknown Love (Xtabay)"	Les Baxter, John Rose	3:18
3.	"High Andes! (Ataypura!)"	Vivanco	3:04
4.	"Monkeys (Monos)"	Vivanco	2:40
5.	"Chant of the Chosen Maidens (Accla Taqui)"	Vivanco, Baxter	2:43
6.	"Dance of the Winds (Wayra)"	Vivanco	3:02
7.	"Earthquake (Tumpa!)"	Vivanco	3:20
8.	"Dance of the Moon Festival (Choladas)"	Vivanco	2:33

Double 7" vinyl, 10" vinyl, and gatefold edition
No.	Title	Writer(s)	Length
1.	"Virgin of the Sun God (Taita Inty)"	Moisés Vivanco	3:06
2.	"High Andes! (Ataypúra!)"	Vivanco	3:04
3.	"Chant of the Chosen Maidens (Accla Taqui)"	Leslie Baxter	2:43
4.	"Earthquake! (Tumpa!)"	Vivanco	3:20
5.	"Dance of the Moon Festival (Choladas)"	Vivanco	2:33
6.	"Dance of the Winds (Wayra)"	Vivanco	3:02
7.	"Monkeys (Monos)"	Vivanco	2:40
8.	"Lure of the Unknown Love (Xtabay)"	Leslie Baxter, John Rose	2:33

Brazilian edition (10" vinyl)
No.	Title	Writer(s)	Length
1.	"Virgem do Deus Sol (Taita Inty)"	Moisés Vivanco	3:06
2.	"Andes altaneiros (Ataypúra!)"	Vivanco	3:04
3.	"Canto das Virgens eleitas (Accla Taqui)"	Leslie Baxter	2:43
4.	"Terremoto (Tumpa!)"	Vivanco	3:20
5.	"Dança do Festival da Lua (Choladas)"	Vivanco	2:33
6.	"Dança dos ventos (Wayra)"	Vivanco	3:02
7.	"Macacos (Monos)"	Vivanco	2:40
8.	"A atração do amor desconhecido (Xtabay)"	Leslie Baxter, John Rose	2:33

== See also ==
- List of best-selling albums by year in the United States
