= Aboudou =

Aboudou is a surname. Notable people with the surname include:

- Affandi Aboudou (born 2003), Seychellois footballer
- Izaka Aboudou (born 1994), Ghanaian footballer
- Jordan Aboudou (born 1991), French basketball player, brother of Lens
- Lens Aboudou (born 1990), French basketball player
