= Hôtel de Ville, Bois-Colombes =

Town hall in Bois-Colombes, France

Hôtel de Ville
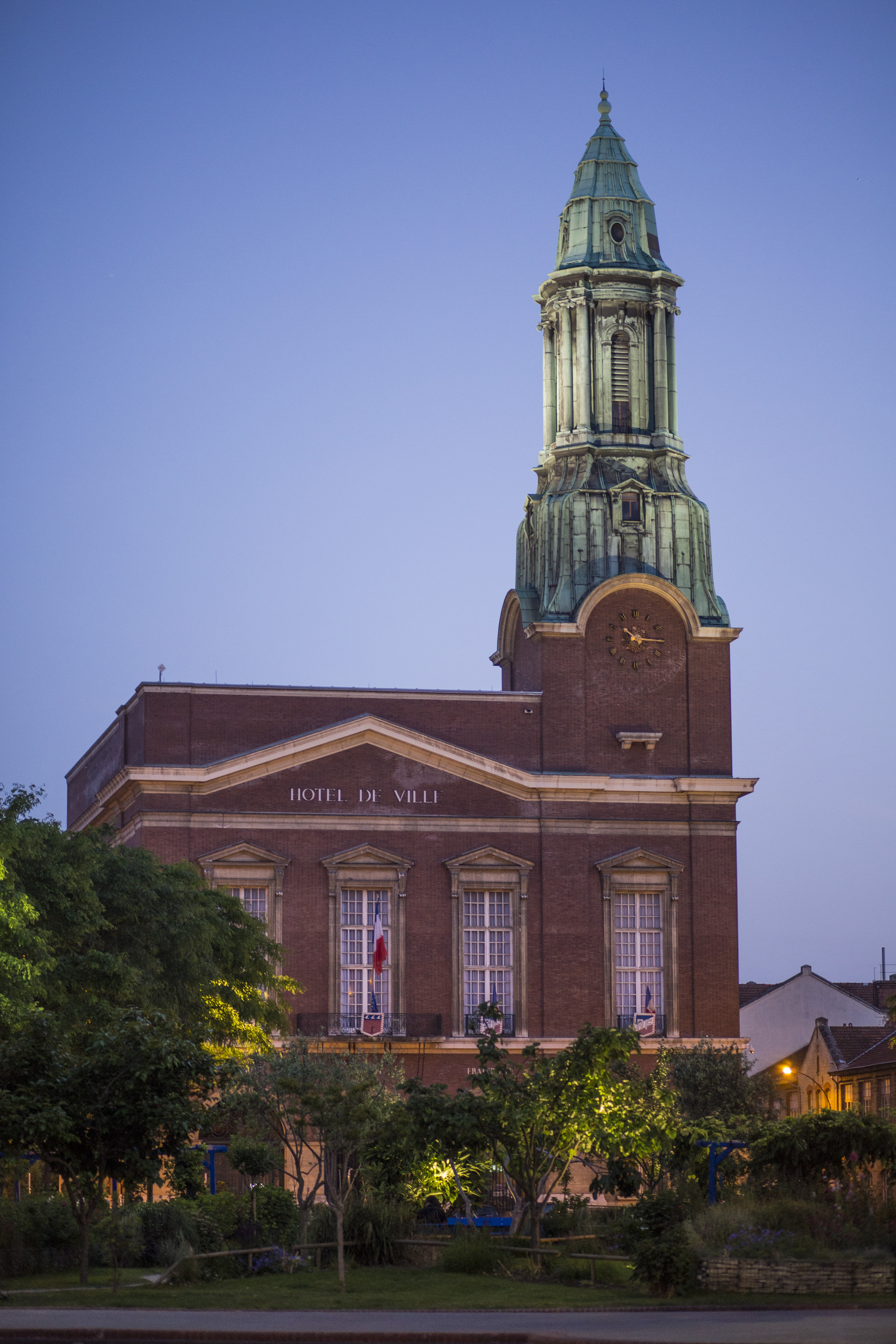
- The main frontage of the Hôtel de Ville in June 2015
- Interactive map of the Hôtel de Ville area

General information
- Type: City hall
- Architectural style: Neoclassical style
- Location: Bois-Colombes, France
- Coordinates: 48.9143°N 2.2677°E
- Completed: 1937

Height
- Height: 57 metres (187 ft)

Design and construction
- Architects: Émile Berthelot and Georges Bovet

The Hôtel de Ville (French pronunciation: [otɛl də vil], City Hall) is a municipal building in Bois-Colombes, Hauts-de-Seine, in the northwestern suburbs of Paris, standing on Rue Charles-Duflos. It has been included on the Inventaire général des monuments by the French Ministry of Culture since 1991.

== History ==
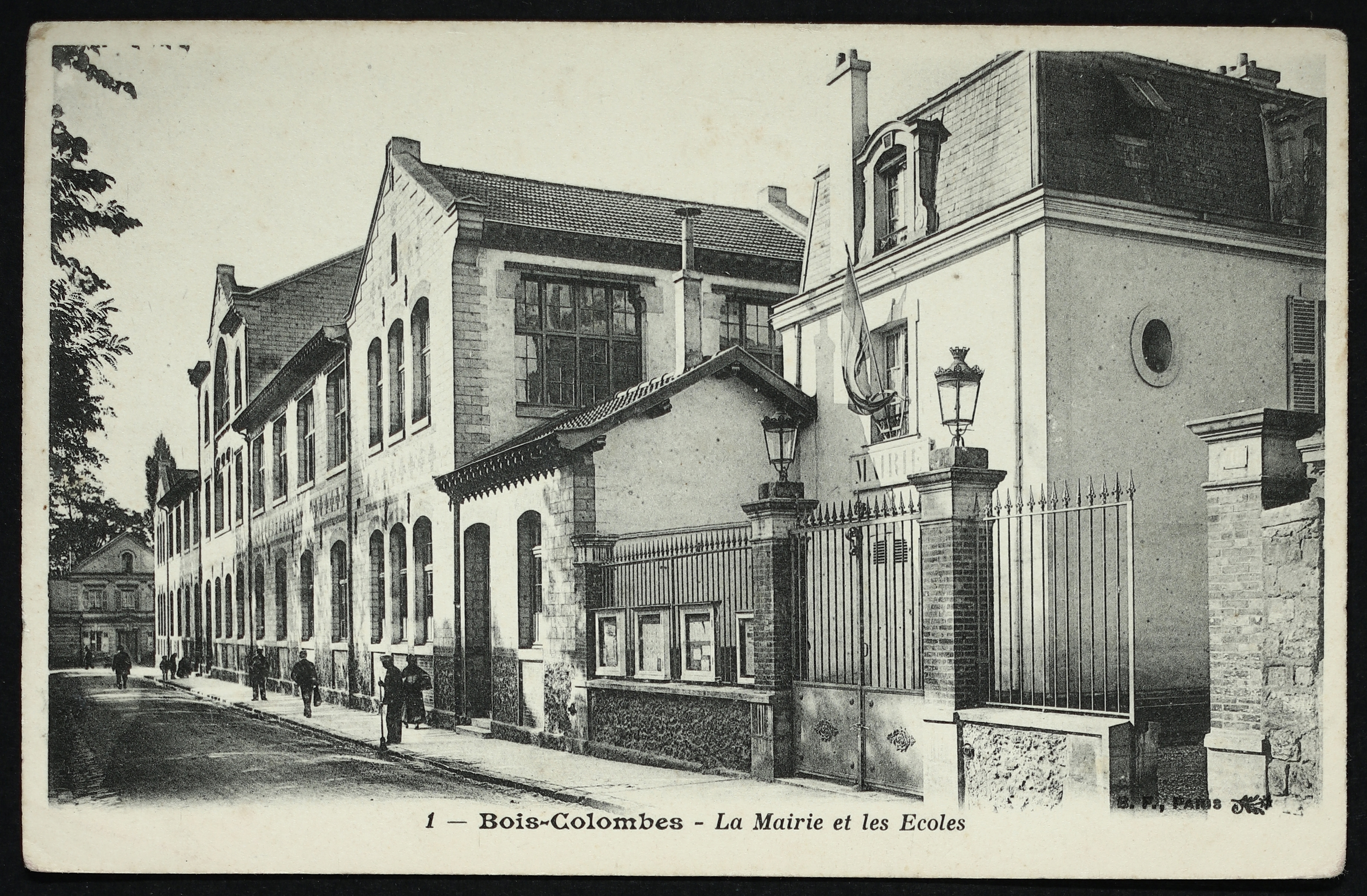
The old town hall on Rue Guizot (on the right)

Following the creation of the commune of Bois-Colombes by detaching part of the commune of Colombes in March 1896, the town council decided to establish their own town hall. They initially met in a building at No. 49 Rue des Aubépines (now No. 55 Rue du Général-Leclerc). However, shortly afterwards, they relocated to a new building on the west side of Rue Guizot (now Rue Auguste-Moreau) at the north end of the school (now Groupe Scolaire Paul-Bert) which had been completed in 1889. The town hall was a small building set back from the road, with a doorway on the ground floor, a casement window with a stone surround on the first floor and a cornice and a mansard roof above.

In the early 1930s, following significant population growth, the council decided to commission a more substantial town hall. The site they selected was on the opposite side of Rue Guizot. Construction of the new building commenced in 1935. It was designed by Émile Berthelot and Georges Bovet in the neoclassical style, built in red brick with ashlar stone finishings and was officially opened by the mayor, Édouard Fillon, in September 1937.

The design involved an asymmetrical main frontage of four bays facing onto Rue Charles-Duflos. The ground floor was arcaded with a series of pilasters and imposts supporting four round headed arches with moulded surrounds. The first floor was fenestrated by four tall casement windows with stone surrounds and pediments. At roof level, there was an open pediment above the first three bays, and a bell tower above the right-hand bay. The bell tower, which was 57 metres (187 ft) high, incorporated a clock in the first stage, while the upper stages, which were formed by a belfry with paired Ionic order columns at each corner supporting a dome, were covered in green copper.

In 1938, in anticipation of the start of the Second World War, an air raid shelter was dug under the Place de la République in front of the town hall. Then, later in the war, during the Paris insurrection, French Resistance seized control of the town hall on 19 August 1944. This was a week in advance of the official liberation of the town by the French 2nd Armoured Division, commanded by General Philippe Leclerc, on 25 August 1944.
