= Le Stade station =

Railway station in Colombes, France

Coordinates: 48°55′53″N 2°15′38″E

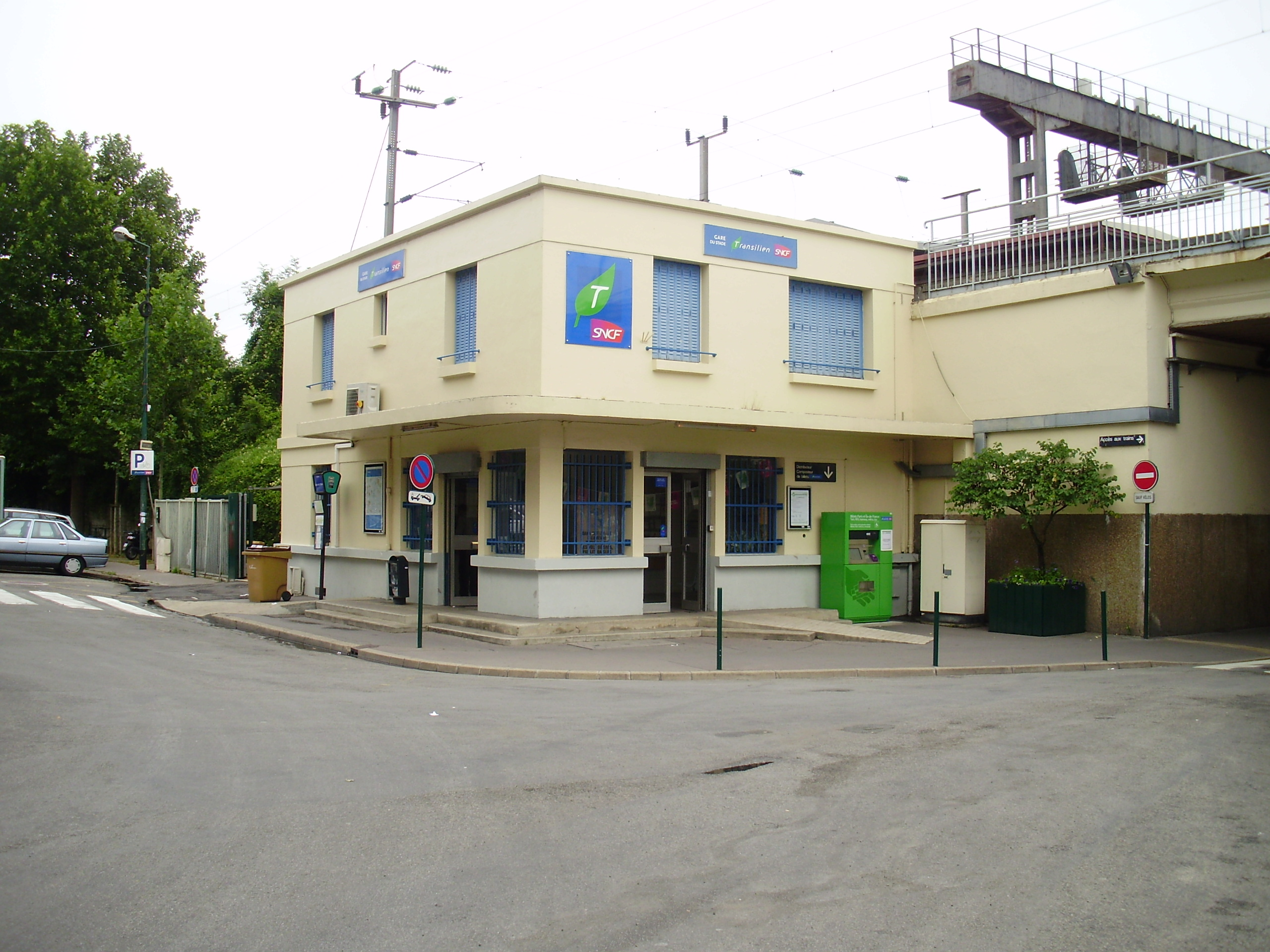
The station

Le Stade is a railway station in Colombes, Hauts-de-Seine department, in the northwestern suburbs of Paris, France.

== History ==
The station was opened in 1924 to serve the Stade Olympique Yves-du-Manoir for the Summer Olympic Games.

== Line serving this station ==
- SNCF Gare Saint-Lazare (Banlieue)–Ermont–Eaubonne (Terminus)

== See also ==
- List of stations of the Paris RER

Preceding station	Transilien	Following station
Colombes towards Paris-St.-Lazare	Line J	Argenteuil towards Ermont–Eaubonne
