= René Maillard =

French composer

René Maillard (8 April 1931 – 4 December 2012) was a French composer.

== Life ==
Born in Bois-Colombes, Maillard had his first violin lessons during the Second World War with Charles Maillier, who was a violin teacher in Limoges. He was then a student of Arthur Hoérée and at the Conservatory of Versailles with Aimé Steck before he entered the Conservatoire de Paris where he won first prizes for harmony, counterpoint and fugue in the classes of Marcel Samuel-Rousseau and Noël Gallon. A student of Tony Aubin for musical composition, he was awarded a Second Grand Prix de Rome for his cantata Le rire de Gargantua by Randal Lemoine (after Rabelais) in 1955 during his first competition. The piece, performed by the Orchestra of the Opéra Comique with singers René Bianco, Louis Rialland and Jacqueline Cauchard conducted by Jean Fournet, earned him the Second Grand Prix.

He was then hired by EMI in 1957 as assistant to the "classical" artistic director René Challan, a position he held until 1960. In particular, he was responsible for recordings by artists such as Samson François, Heitor Villa-Lobos, Paul Tortelier, Aldo Ciccolini.

Despite a favourable reception for his first compositions, the dislocation of the group "Pentacorde" and the appearance of the "serialist episode" encouraged him to abandon music for good. He then made a career as a senior executive in an international company.

His works have been performed by artists such as Jean Hubeau, André Collard, Robert Quatrocchi, Hélène Pignari, Jean Della-Valle, the Orchestre de chambre de la radio conducted by Louis de Froment, the Orchestre de chambre de Versailles conducted by Bernard Wahl. In 1960 the Festival d'Aix-en-Provence gave the creation of his Concerto da camera N°2 for strings under the direction of Serge Baudo.

After an interruption of forty years, Nicolas Bacri encouraged him to return to composition. Maillart began composing again in the early 2000s. Among others, a Sonata for viola and piano (for the duo Arnaud Thorette and Johan Farjot) and a string trio commissioned by the Trio des Solistes de Cannes (Berhilde Dufour, Eszter Biro and Philippe Cauchefer) were composed. About Maillard, Nicolas Bacri wrote: ... a new generation of performers is discovering (his work), sensitive to the charm of a discourse that is both dense and clear, part of a timeless classicism which, from Couperin to Dutilleux, via Roussel, has always been the mark of the great "French musicians".

Maillard died in Nice (Alpes-Maritimes) in 2012.

== Works ==
=== At éditions Delatour France ===
- Sonata No. 1 for viola and piano, Op. 5 (1952, revised 2009)
- Sonata No. 2 for viola and piano, Op. 18 (2003)
- String Trio
- Sonata for violin and piano
- Petite suite for 2 double basses
- Le Bal des champs for 3 voice choir, solo soprano and piano
- Prélude Aria et Fugue for cello and organ
- Fébrilité, 3 melodies on poems by Dominique Pagnier
- Hymne et Toccata for organ
- Toccata for piano
- Concerto da camera No. 1 for strings
- Concerto da camera No. 2 for strings (Disque Naxos)
- Concerto grosso for wind quintet and string orchestra (Disque Naxos)

=== At éditions « Le Chant du Monde » ===
- String Quartet
- Wind Quintet
- Duo Sonata for Violin (disc TRITON)
- Survivre après Hiroshima, cantata for mezzo-soprano, choir and orchestra (Naxos Records)
- Sonata for organ
