= Omar Khayyam (1957 film) =

1957 film

- Theatrical poster
- Directed by: William Dieterle
- Written by: Barré Lyndon
- Produced by: Frank Freeman Jr.
- Starring: Cornel Wilde; Michael Rennie; Debra Paget; John Derek; Raymond Massey; Yma Sumac; Margaret Hayes; Joan Taylor
- Cinematography: Ernest Laszlo
- Edited by: Everett Douglas
- Music by: Victor Young; Jay Livingston; Moises Vivanco
- Distributed by: Paramount Pictures
- Release date: August 23, 1957
- Running time: 101 min
- Country: United States
- Language: English
- Box office: $1.2 million (US rental)

Omar Khayyam (also released as The Life, Loves and Adventures of Omar Khayyam and The Loves of Omar Khayyam) is an American historical adventure film directed by William Dieterle that was filmed in 1956 (mostly on the Paramount lot) and released in 1957. It stars Cornel Wilde as Omar Khayyam, the eponymous Persian poet, Michael Rennie as Hasani Sabah and famous exotica singer Yma Sumac as Karina. It was the final film to be scored by Victor Young, who died before the film's release. It was also the last film made by Dieterle after thirty six years in Hollywood, before returning to Europe for the remainder of his career and life.

== Cast ==
- Cornel Wilde as Omar Khayyam
- Michael Rennie as Hasani Sabah
- Debra Paget as Sharain
- John Derek as Prince Malik
- Raymond Massey as the Shah
- Yma Sumac as Karina
- Margaret Hayes as Queen Zarada
- Joan Taylor as Yaffa
- Sebastian Cabot as the Nizam
- Perry Lopez as Prince Ahmud
- Morris Ankrum as Imam Nowaffak
- Abraham Sofaer as Tutush
- Edward Platt as Jayhan

== Reception ==
FilmInk called the film "sluggish".

== See also ==
- List of American films of 1957
- Three Schoolfellows
