= Blondine =

1945 film

- Directed by: Henri Mahé
- Written by: Paule Hutzler
- Produced by: Paul-Edmond Decharme
- Starring: Georges Marchal; Nicole Maurey; Michèle Philippe
- Cinematography: René Colas
- Edited by: Monique Kirsanoff
- Music by: Marceau Van Hoorebecke
- Production company: Gaumont
- Distributed by: Gaumont Distribution; Compagnie Parisienne de Location de Films
- Release date: 16 May 1945
- Running time: 61 minutes
- Country: France
- Language: French

Blondine is a 1945 French fantasy film directed by Henri Mahé and starring Georges Marchal, Nicole Maurey and Michèle Philippe. It was produced in 1943 but not released until 1945 following the Liberation.

== Cast ==
- Georges Marchal as Le Prince 'A' / Astara
- Nicole Maurey as Blondine
- Michèle Philippe as Brune
- Piéral as Monchéri
- Guita Karen as Kira
- Jean Clarens as Yann
- Libero as Le génie des eaux
- Tony Laurent as Le capitaine-fantôme
- René Wilmet as Kerikal
- Alfred Baillou as Le premier fou
- Franck Maurice as Le bourreau

== Bibliography ==
- Bessy, Maurice & Chirat, Raymond. Histoire du cinéma français: encyclopédie des films, 1940–1950. Pygmalion, 1986.
