= Mambo! (album) =

1954 album by soprano Yma Sumac

Studio album by Yma Sumac
- Released: 1954
- Recorded: August 1954
- Genre: Exotica, world, mambo
- Length: 30:37
- Label: Capitol

Yma Sumac chronology
Inca Taqui (1953)	Mambo! (1954)	Legend of the Jivaro (1957)

Professional ratings
Review scores
Source	Rating
AllMusic	Link

Mambo! is the fifth studio album by Peruvian soprano Yma Sumac. It was released in 1954 by Capitol Records. The music accompaniment is by The Rico Mambo Orchestra, conducted by Billy May, who also wrote the arrangements. Many of the tracks on the album were composed by Sumac's husband, Moisés Vivanco. The rest were composed by Billy May, who co-composed one track with lead trumpet player Conrad Gozzo.

== Track listing ==
Standard edition
No.	Title	Writer(s)	Length
1.	"Bo Mambo"	Billy May, Moisés Vivanco	3:17
2.	"Taki Rari"	Vivanco	1:47
3.	"Gopher"	Billy May, Conrad Gozzo	2:14
4.	"Chicken Talk"	Vivanco	3:03
5.	"Goomba Boomba"	Billy May	4:12
6.	"Malambo No. 1"	Vivanco	2:53
7.	"Five Bottles Mambo"	Billy May, Moisés Vivanco	2:49
8.	"Indian Carnival"	Vivanco	2:04
9.	"Cha Cha Gitano"	Vivanco	3:48
10.	"Jungla"	Billy May	2:25
11.	"Carnavalito Boliviano"	Vivanco	2:05

The original 10" edition had eight tracks. "Goomba Boomba", "Cha Cha Gitano" and "Carnavalito Boliviano" were added for the 1955 LP edition.

== Legacy ==
"Gopher" is featured prominently in the 1998 black comedy film Dead Husbands. "Malambo No. 1" was featured on season 5 of the reality competition television series RuPaul's Drag Race.
