= Colombes station =

Railway station in suburb of Paris

Colombes
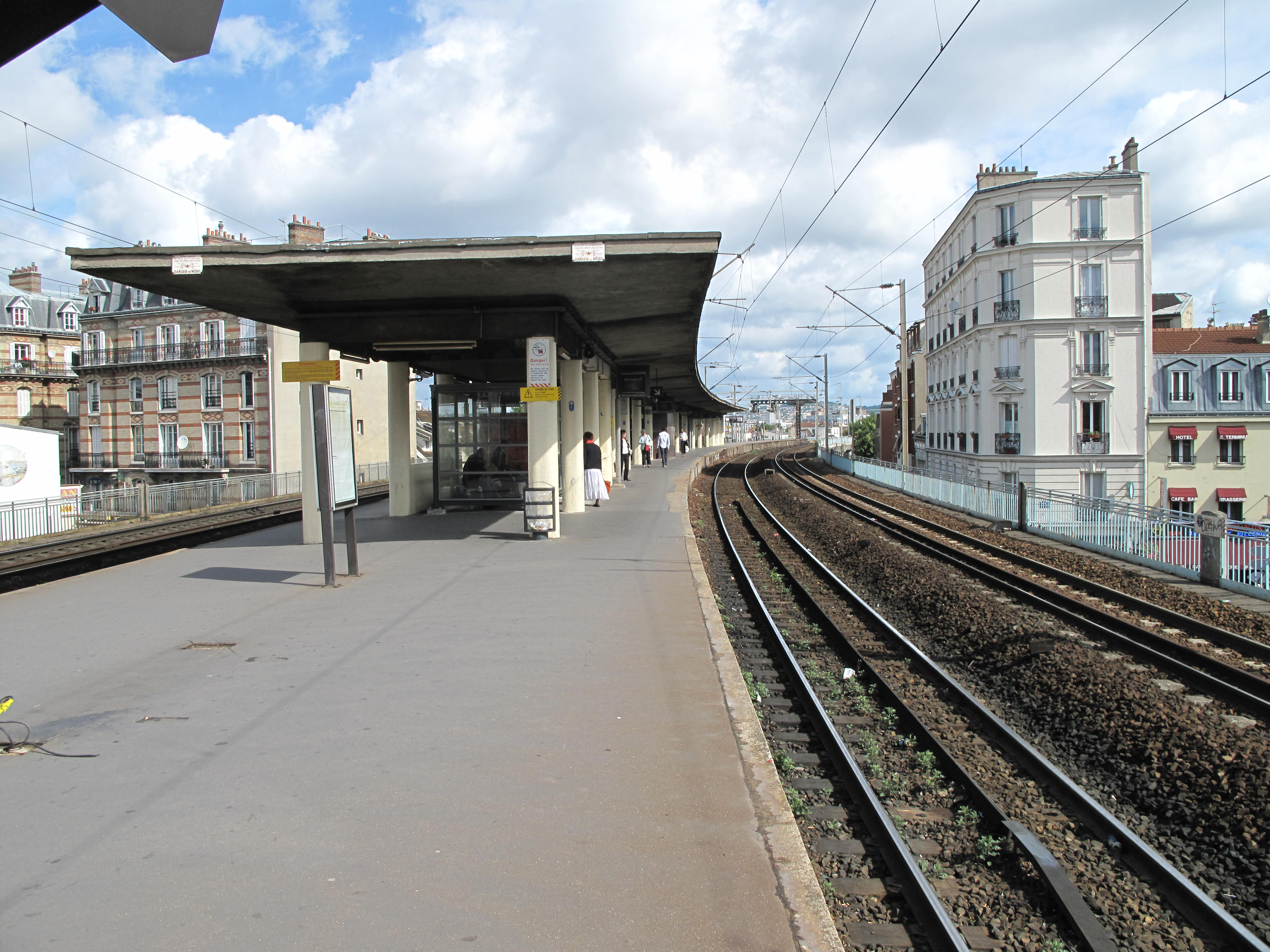

General information
- Location: Colombes, Hauts-de-Seine, Île-de-France, France
- Coordinates: 48°55′25″N 2°15′34″E

Other information
- Station code: 87381087

Passengers
- 2024: 6,155,138

Services
Preceding station	Transilien	Following station
Bois-Colombes towards Paris-St.-Lazare	Line J	Le Stade towards Ermont–Eaubonne
Location

Colombes is a railway station in the town Colombes, in the department of Hauts-de-Seine, in the northwestern suburbs of Paris, France. It is served by Transilien commuter trains.

== See also ==
- List of stations of the Paris RER
