= Hôtel de Ville, Colombes =

Town hall in Colombes, France

Hôtel de Ville
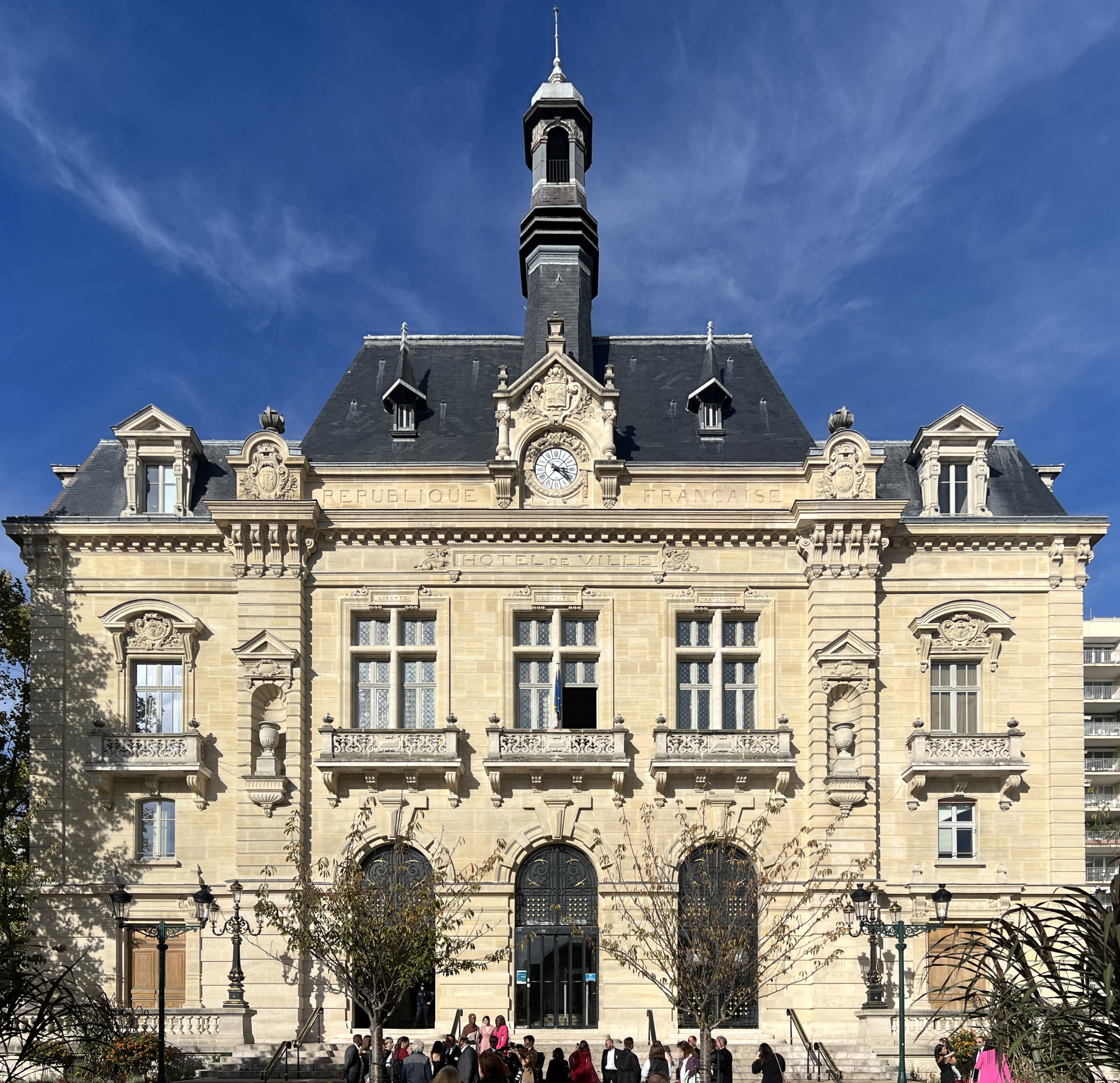
- The main frontage of the Hôtel de Ville in October 2022
- Interactive map of the Hôtel de Ville area

General information
- Type: City hall
- Architectural style: Neoclassical style
- Location: Colombes, France
- Coordinates: 48.9225°N 2.2544°E
- Completed: 1923

Design and construction
- Architects: Paul and Albert Leseine

The Hôtel de Ville (French pronunciation: [otɛl də vil], City Hall) is a municipal building in Colombes, Hauts-de-Seine, in the northwest suburbs of Paris, France, standing on Place de la République. It has been included on the Inventaire général des monuments by the French Ministry of Culture since 1991.

== History ==
In the mid-19th century, the town council decided to commission a town hall on a site at No. 13 Rue de Paris (now Avenue Henri Barbusse). The building was designed in the neoclassical style, built in ashlar stone and was completed around 1850. The design involved a symmetrical main frontage of just three bays facing onto Rue de Paris. An extra storey was added in the late 19th century. Internally, there were municipal offices on the ground floor, a council chamber on the first floor and a caretaker's flat on the second floor.

In 1911, the council decided to commission a more substantial town hall. The site they selected was occupied by a large private mansion. The foundation stone for the new building was laid by the prefect of Hauts-de-Seine, Marcel Delanney, accompanied by the mayor, Pierre Geofroix, on 2 March 1913. Progress was interrupted by the First World War and resumed in 1920. It was designed by Paul and Albert Leseine in the neoclassical style, built in ashlar stone and was officially opened by the mayor, Maurice Chavany, on 2 December 1923.

The design involved a symmetrical main frontage of five bays facing onto Place de la République. The central section of three bays featured a short flight of steps leading to three round headed openings with moulded surrounds, keystones and iron grills; there were three tall cross windows with moulded surrounds and balconies on the first floor. The central section was flanked by banded pilasters with niches containing urns on the first floor. The outer bays contained doorways flanked by pilasters supporting cornices on the ground floor, and there were casement windows with segmental pediments and balconies on the first floor. At roof level, there was an entablature, a modillioned cornice and, above the central bay, there was a clock flanked by colonettes supporting a triangular pediment. There were also dormer windows above the outer bays. Internally, the principal rooms were the Salle du Conseil (council chamber) and the Salles des Mariages (wedding room).

The wedding room was decorated with three ceiling murals and seven cartouches, all on the theme of love and family, which were completed by Paul Albert Laurens in 1925. The grand staircase was decorated with two large murals, which were completed by Loÿs Prat in 1934. One of these depicted Queen Marie Antoinette visiting the Moulin Joly Garden in 1774, while the other depicted a winning athlete being cheered by a crowd at the Stade Yves-du-Manoir during the 1924 Olympic Games. Other decorations on the grand staircase included a painting in bas-relief depicting Queen Henrietta Maria, who died at the Château de Colombes in 1669.

During the Paris insurrection of 19 and 20 August 1944, part the Second World War, German troops fired artillery shells at the town hall, causing damage to the roof and to the grand staircase. This was only a week before the liberation of the town by the French 2nd Armoured Division, commanded by General Philippe Leclerc, on 26 August 1944.
