= Diaka Camara =

Guinean journalist

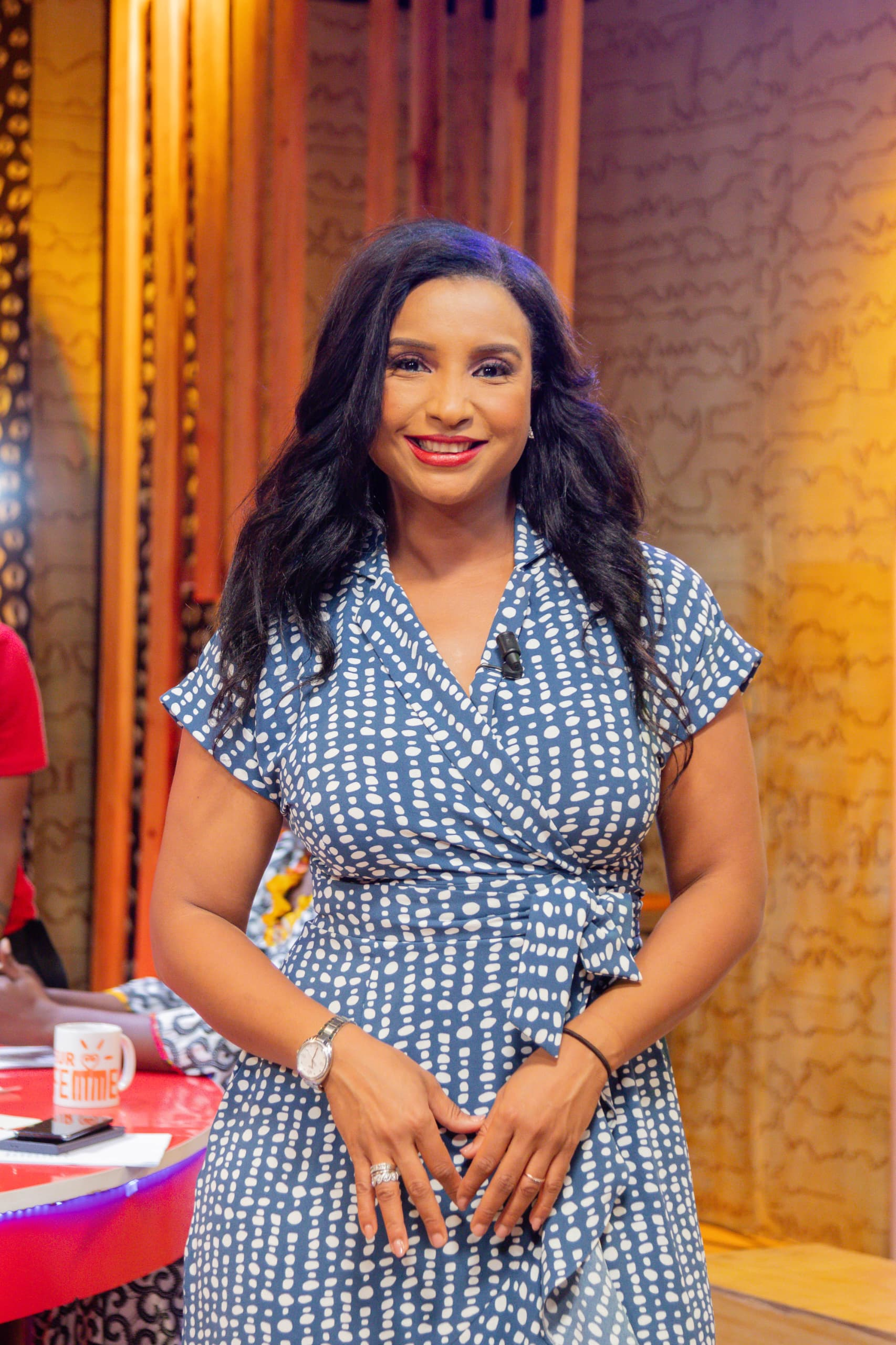
- Born: 13 November 1980 (age 45); Brussels
- Citizenship: Guinea
- Education: Bachelor in communication and journalism
- Alma mater: University of Houston
- Occupations: Guinea producer, journalist, animator and entrepreneur
- Notable work: Leads CBC worldmed COM and PROD
- Awards: Best TV animator in Guinea ( 2011) Laurete in the category of medias at the katala ( 2014)

Diaka Camara is a Guinean producer, journalist, animator and entrepreneur. She leads CBC Worldwide COM & PROD which produces ''Le Mannequin'', the first TV-Reality show in francophone West Africa.

== Early life and education ==
Born in Brussels, November 13, 1980, Diaka Camara was raised in Guinea by a businessman father and a lawyer mother. Born to a family with four siblings, Camara speaks fluent English and French as well as several Guinean languages such as Susu, Fula and Malinke.

She began her primary school studies at the Lycée français Albert Camus in Conakry. After obtaining her degree (BEPC) at the collège Sainte Marie, she emigrated in 1994 to Texas (U.S.) where she obtained a Bachelor in communication and journalism at the University of Houston in 2006.

== Career ==
In 2010, after an apprenticeship at Telemundo (a subsidiary of NBC), and then a job as an account manager at Chase Bank, she left the United States to move to Conakry, motivated by the desire to launch a business dedicated to the creation of audiovisual content Made in Africa.

In 2011, Camara created her audiovisual production company, CBC Worldwide COM & PROD.

Passionate about music, the same year, she launched and animated the program TOP 10 dedicated to urban music. The show brought to the spotlight many Guinean and African talents. Broadcast on the national television network as well as private networks, TOP 10 was an immediate success. Sometimes criticised for her "American" style of presentation, Camara won a large portion of her audience since, through her contemporary interviews, she permits the young viewership to discover local talents of African art, fashion and culture, previously little valued by the media. The program, buoyed by the popularity of Camara, has become an unavoidable point of reference for celebrities, events and brands which want to gain visibility in Guinea. She covers a broad range of subjects including Davido, Soprano, André Ayew, Black M, Sexion d'Assaut, Fanny J, Adama Paris, Ky-Mani Marley, Soul Bangs, the inauguration of Rwandan president Paul Kagamé, Afrochella, Kigali up, Yakaar, Youth Connect, the Salon de l’Emploi in Paris, as well as the Africa-Turkey forum.

In 2014, to participate in the fight against Ebola, Camara produced, in partnership with UNICEF, the Minister of Youth and MTN Guinée, a 26-minute documentary titled 1 sauve 100, in which she met with victims of the epidemic throughout the country. The documentary was translated into many languages (sussu, fula, malinké, guerzé, kissi and toma) and broadcast on national and international television channels like Africa 24, but also at schools and youth homes.

In 2019, Canal+ chose her among the most influential personalities in the African continent to participate in the cult show Fort Boyard.

== Pro bono work ==
=== Diaka Camara Foundation ===
In 2017, she worked on creating the Diaka Camara Foundation to promote education for all, and especially for young girls. She hopes to work to "contribute to the structural change necessary to make Guinea an emerging country, where education will be accessible to all."

In the framework of the project "one school, one library", she participated in the renovation and creation of modern libraries in Conakry.

==== Ambassador of causes ====
Camara used her platform very early on to help large-scale communication campaigns such as the battle against the Ebola virus, female genital mutilation, and violence against women in all its forms.

In 2016, with the support of the United States embassy in Conakry, the producer worked to fight against female genital mutilation. She directed an advertisement titled: "Let's protect our girls against female genital mutilation" (appearing on television commercials as well as on billboards throughout the city of Conakry).

== Awards and honours ==
- 2011: Best TV animator in Guinée at the Djassa d'Or
- 2014: Laureate in the category of médias at the Katala 224
- 2019: Afrique au féminin, Canal+
- 2020: Membre du Tutu Fellowship
