= Lycée français Albert Camus =

French international school in Conakry, Guinea

Coordinates: 9°36′31″N 13°38′49″W

- Conakry; Guinea

Information
- School type: International School
- Established: 1963
- Age: 3 to 18
- Enrollment: 1050 (2019)
- Language: French
- Website: https://www.lyceealbertcamus-conakry.org/

The Lycée Français Albert Camus (or LAC) is a French international school situated in Conakry, Guinea. In 2019, it welcomes 1050 students aged 3 to 18 and teaches mainly in French. Its curriculum and management are overseen by the French National Ministry of Education through the Agency for the Teaching of French Abroad (AEFE).

== History ==
The Lycée was created in 1963 in Kaloum near the French embassy. It moved in 1986 to Kipé at its current location.

The school closed for a while due to the political instability of September 2009. Closed in October 2009, it re-opened in September 2010. In November 2016, the President of the Republic, Alpha Condé and the French Minister of Foreign Affairs, Jean-Marc Ayrault participated in the laying of the first stone of the school building. In September 2018, with participation of MM. Jean Marc Grosgurin, Ambassador of France in Guinea, the school inaugurated "building C", a two-level extension with "9 classrooms that can accommodate 180 students, a refectory and a high school student hostel". The building cost €650,000 and has been designed to increase student capacity.

== Description ==
It has pupils of 37 nationalities. As the only privately funded school by the French government in Conakry, it caters mainly to the expatriate community. Its teachers are mainly brought in from France and the EU although locals are hired as well.

The LAC offers three high school curriculum streams: Série Scientifique; Serie Economie Sociale and Série Litteraire. The lycée offers the French Baccalaureate as a culmination of a students studies. It is administered by the Académie de Bordeaux (France). Baccalaureate tests are administered in Conakry, but are graded by other AEFE teachers in Dakar, Senegal. Students are encouraged to apply to a university in France/French Territories to pursue their studies.

Extracurricular activities include sports, pottery, rollerblading and judo for students grades 1–5. In grade 6 extra curricular activities are limited to sports (soccer, volleyball and soccer).

The school organize an annual running events call « Le Cross ». Students from 3 to 18 parents and teachers participate in this event and even others school are invitâted in this competition. The winners win prices .

== Alumni ==
- Diaka Camara, TV host
- Gabriel Curtis, Guinean politician

== See also ==
- Education in Guinea
