= Lycée Albert-Camus (Bois-Colombes) =

Senior high school in France

Lycée Albert-Camus is a French senior high school in Bois-Colombes, Hauts-de-Seine, France, in the Paris metropolitan area.

The school has German, Spanish, Italian, and English international sections.
