= Secret of the Incas =

1954 American adventure film by Jerry Hopper

- Film poster
- Directed by: Jerry Hopper
- Written by: Sydney Boehm; Ranald MacDougall
- Based on: The Legend of the Incas by Sydney Boehm
- Produced by: Mel Epstein
- Starring: Charlton Heston; Robert Young; Nicole Maurey; Thomas Mitchell
- Cinematography: Lionel Lindon; Irma Roberts
- Edited by: Eda Warren
- Music by: David Buttolph
- Production company: Paramount Pictures
- Distributed by: Paramount Pictures
- Release date: June 6, 1954
- Running time: 98 minutes
- Country: United States
- Language: English
- Box office: $1.4 million

Secret of the Incas is a 1954 American adventure film directed by Jerry Hopper and starring Charlton Heston as adventurer Harry Steele, on the trail of an ancient Incan artifact. The supporting cast features Robert Young, Nicole Maurey, and Thomas Mitchell, as well as a rare film appearance by Peruvian singer Yma Sumac. Shot on location at Machu Picchu in Peru, the film is often credited as the inspiration for Raiders of the Lost Ark.

== Plot ==
American adventurer Harry Steele makes a living as a tour guide in Cusco, Peru, but plans to earn his fortune by finding the legendary gold and jeweled "sunburst", a lost Inca treasure, at the ancient capital of Machu Picchu. He possesses a fragment of a carved stone block which gives the location of the sunburst when placed on a stone map of the ancient tomb complex, housed at a local museum. Bar owner Ed Morgan, has been searching for the treasure for fourteen years and hires a sniper to frighten off Harry. Harry survives an attempted hit, threatens Morgan, and refuses to sell him the stone. Morgan vows revenge.

Through Morgan, Harry learns that Elena Antonescu, a Romanian defector, may want his services. With little money and the police on her trail, she plays on Harry's sympathy by claiming Anton Marcu, a Romanian official with a small plane, is pursuing her. Harry informs Marcu of Elena's whereabouts then ostensibly agrees to help her flee to Mexico and eventually America if she helps steal Marcu's plane. Harry gets Marcu drunk, Elena steals his keys, and the pair flies off. Elena objects when Harry detours to Machu Picchu but he seduces her into cooperating.

An archaeological expedition in Macchu Picchu headed by Dr. Stanley Moorehead is preparing to enter the tomb where the sunburst is presumed to be located. Harry tells Moorehead their plane needs fuel, then disables the expedition's radio to block news of pursuit by the authorities. Elena disapproves of Harry's plan to steal the sunburst. Morgan arrives and informs Harry that Marcu was too embarrasssed to reported the plane stolen and thus the authorities are not searching for him. Morgan coerces Harry into helping him find the treasure, and Harry feigns cooperation. Harry refuses Elena's request to abandon his plan and leave with her, and solicits her to watch Moorehead. The infatuated Moorehead asks her to marry him and return to America together. She gives no clear answer, but informs Harry of the proposal.

The expedition opens a wall of Manco's tomb and is disappointed to find only a carved stone sunburst. Harry gives Morgan the bad news. Harry returns to the tomb alone and uses a reflection of light on an artifact to highlight where the sunburst is hidden inside a hollow pillar. Morgan, having followed him, emerges, takes the sunburst at gunpoint, and is chased off by natives. Harry finds Morgan on a cliff edge, they wrestle for the treasure, and Morgan falls to his death.

Harry gives the sunburst back to the natives, who return it to the Temple of the Sun. A legend states that when it is placed there, the glory of the Incas will be restored. To the authorities, Harry asserts that he only found the sunburst. Morgan stole it and Harry got it back. Harry tells Elena that unless Colonel Cardoza is "real friendly", they may have a long engagement. In the meantime, Harry gives Elena an ancient gold pin that "fell into his pocket."

== Cast ==
- Charlton Heston as Harry Steele
- Robert Young as Stanley Moorhead
- Nicole Maurey as Elena Antonescu
- Thomas Mitchell as Ed Morgan
- Glenda Farrell as Mrs. Winston
- Yma Sumac as Kori-Tika
- Michael Pate as Pachacutec
- Leon Askin as Anton Marcu
- William Henry as Phillip Lang
- Marion Ross as Miss Morris
- Alvy Moore as man in bar
Main cast
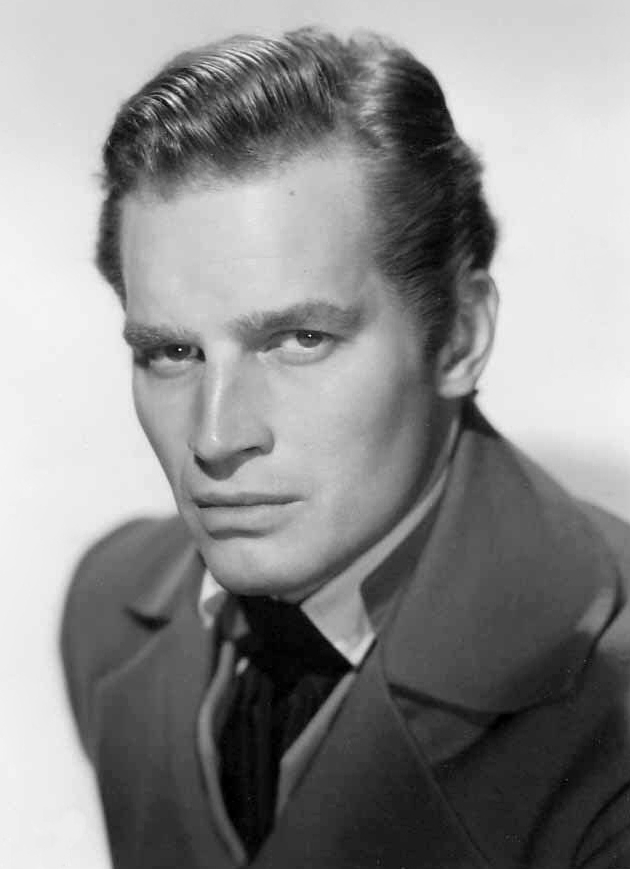
Charlton Heston

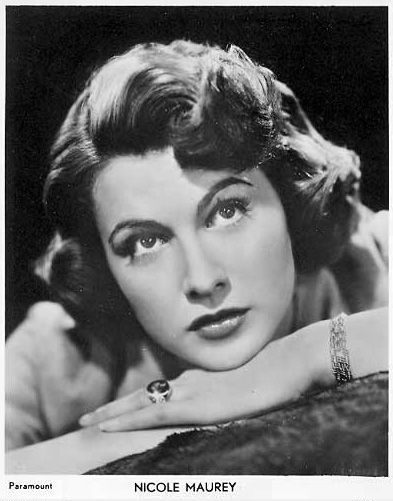
Nicole Maurey

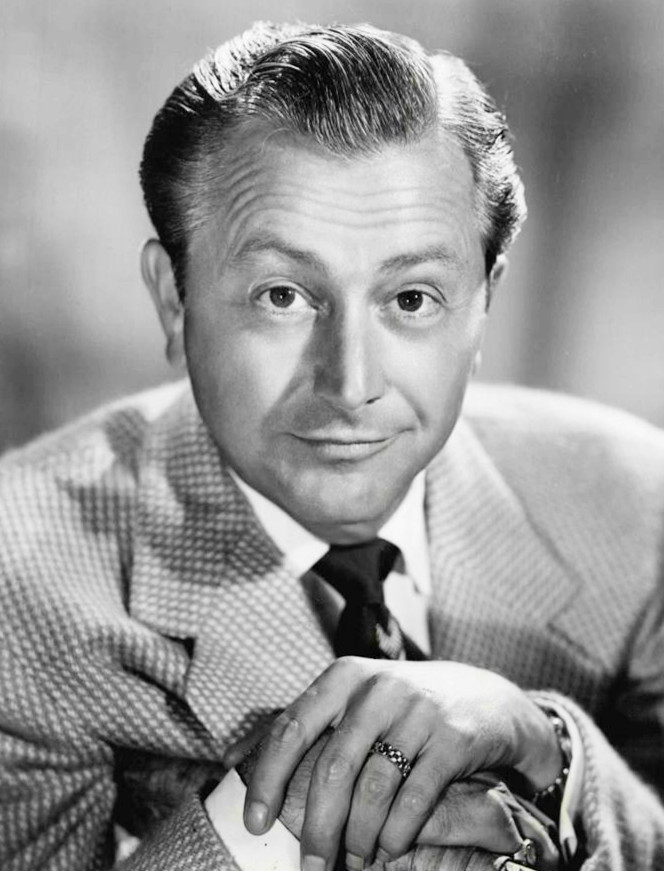
Robert Young

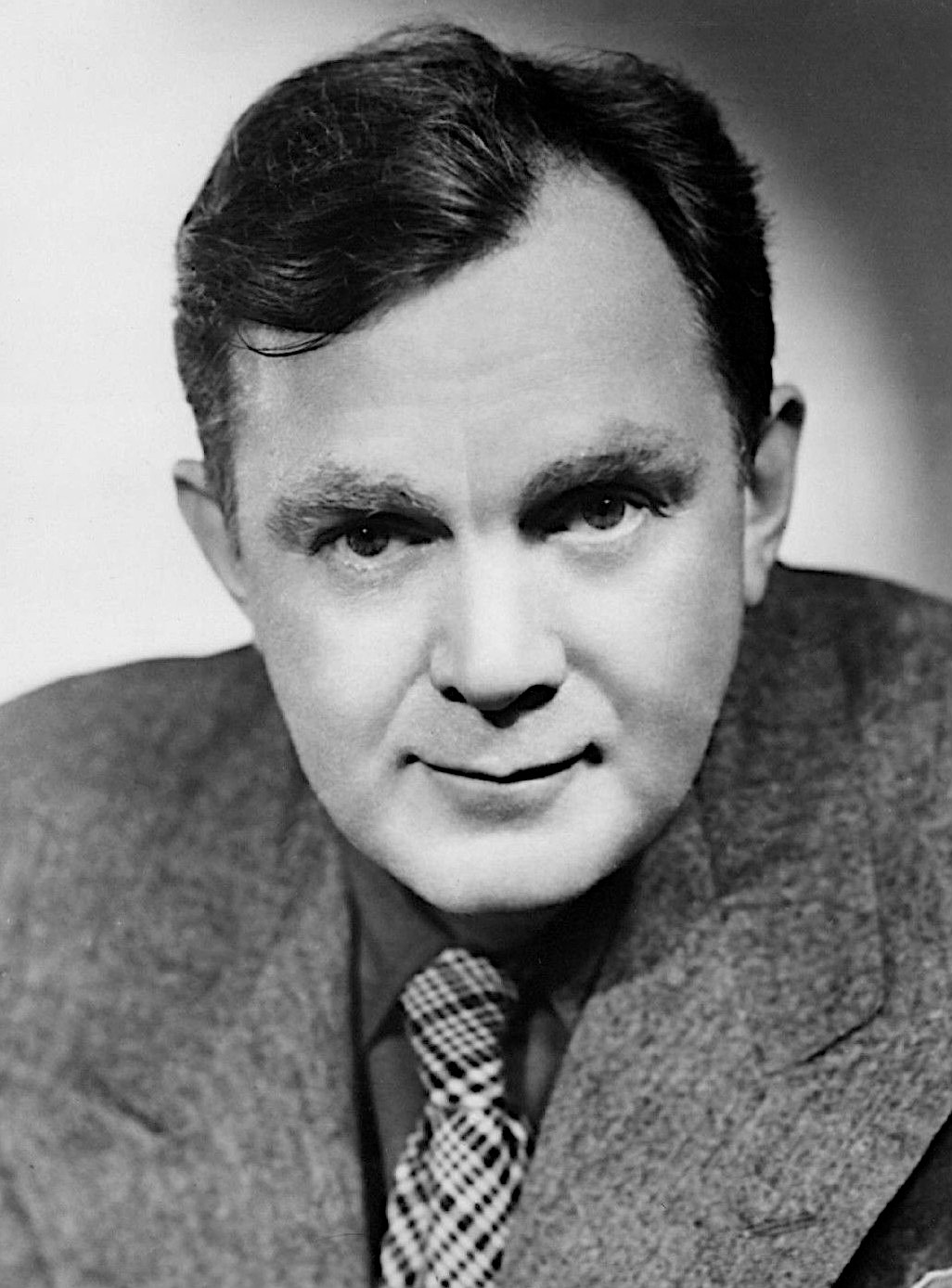
Thomas Mitchell

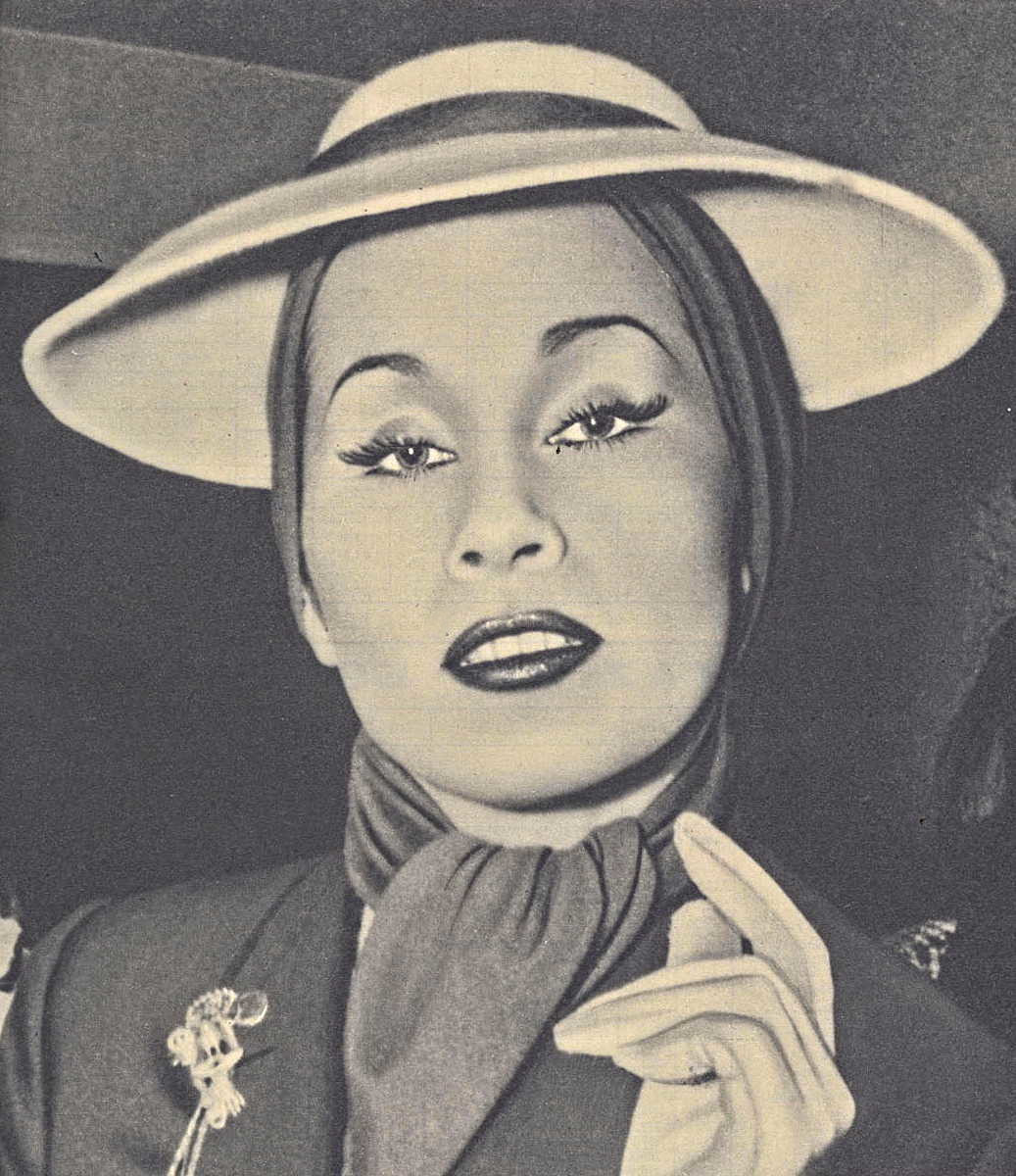
Yma Sumac

== Production ==
The film was originally known as Legend of the Incas. Paramount announced it as part of their 1953 slate in July 1952. Adventure films set outside America were popular in Hollywood at the time; producer Mel Epstein says that Paramount decided to make this film mostly because there had not been one shot in Peru before.

Wendell Corey was originally announced as the leading star. In July 1953 Paramount took over Hal B. Wallis' contract with Charlton Heston and announced he would make the film after he finished The Naked Jungle.

Secret of the Incas was filmed on location in Peru at Cuzco and Machu Picchu, the first time that a major Hollywood studio filmed at this archeological site. A sixteen-person unit, including Heston, producer Mel Epstein and director Jerry Hopper, spent a month filming footage in Peru in 1953.

Five hundred indigenous people were used as extras.

The film also featured the Peruvian singer Yma Sumac as Kori-Tica.

The female lead was to have been played by Viveca Lindfors. However, after the positive response to Nicole Maurey's performance in Little Boy Lost Paramount gave her the role. Thomas Mitchell was signed to play the villain.

Studio filming started in October 1953. Shortly beforehand, Wendell Corey dropped out of the film. He was replaced by Robert Young. Filming ended on 22 November.

The film caused a surge in tourism to Peru in 1954.

== Influence on Raiders of the Lost Ark ==
Harry Steele in what later become known as the "Indiana Jones" outfit: brown leather jacket, fedora, tan pants, an over-the-shoulder bag, and revolver.

The film is often cited by film buffs as a direct inspiration for the Indiana Jones film franchise, with many of the scenes in Raiders of the Lost Ark bearing a striking resemblance in tone and structure to scenes in Secret of the Incas. Throughout Secret of the Incas, the main character, Harry Steele, can be seen wearing what would later become known as the "Indiana Jones" outfit: brown leather jacket, fedora, tan pants, an over-the-shoulder bag, and revolver. The character also sometimes wears a light beard, unusual for films of its time, and there is a tomb scene involving a revelatory shaft of light similar to the "Map Room" sequence in Raiders.

Raiders' costume designer Deborah Nadoolman Landis noted that the inspiration for Indiana's costume was Charlton Heston's Harry Steele in Secret of the Incas: "We did watch this film together as a crew several times, and I always thought it strange that the filmmakers did not credit it later as the inspiration for the series" and quipped that the film is "almost a shot for shot Raiders of the Lost Ark."

== Other media ==
On December 14, 1954, Charlton Heston and Nicole Maurey reprised their roles in a Lux Radio Theater version of Secret of the Incas.
