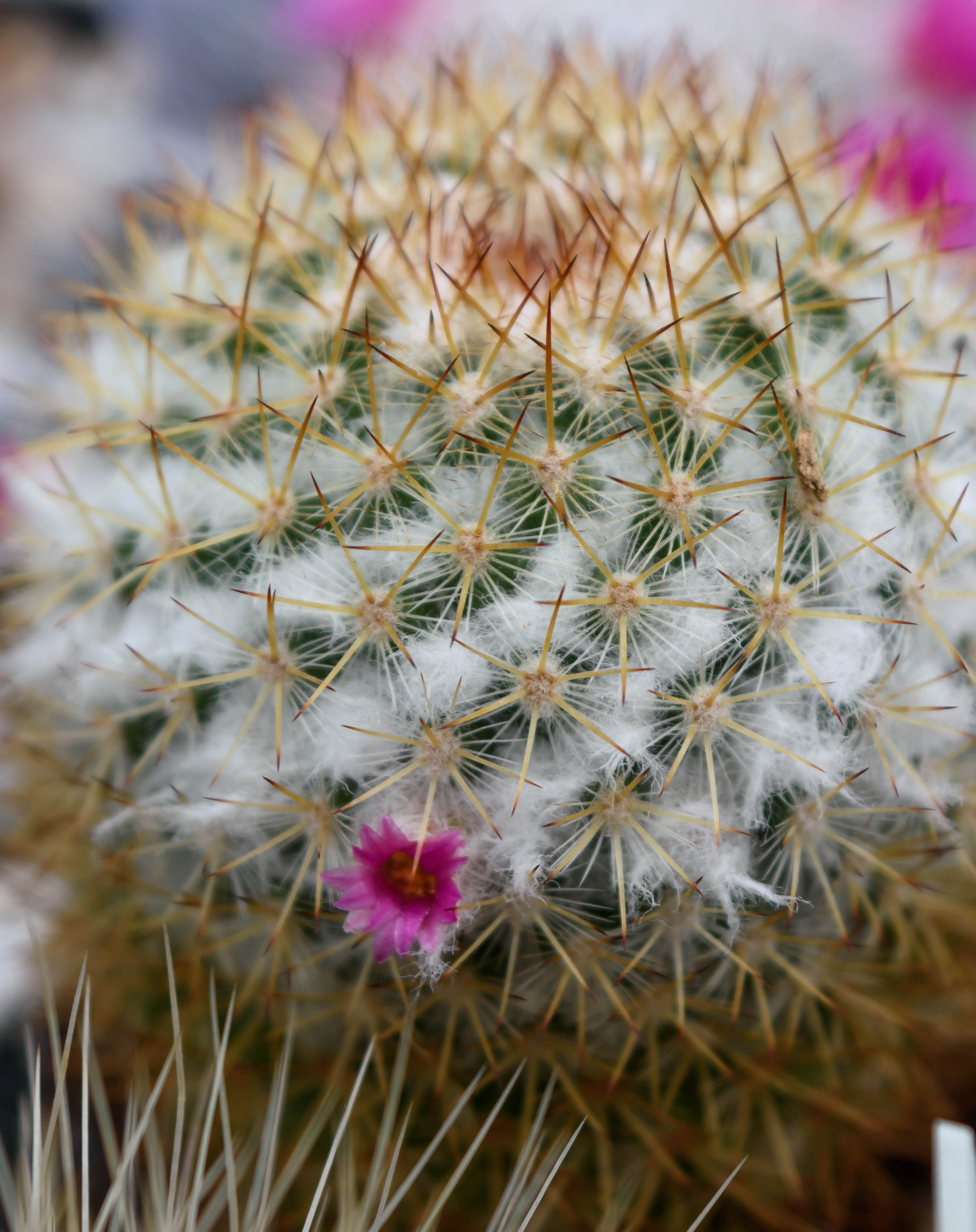

Scientific classification
- Kingdom: Plantae
- Clade: Tracheophytes
- Clade: Angiosperms
- Clade: Eudicots
- Order: Caryophyllales
- Family: Cactaceae
- Subfamily: Cactoideae
- Genus: Mammillaria
- Species: M. columbiana

Binomial name
- Mammillaria columbiana Salm-Dyck., 1850

= Mammillaria columbiana =

Species of cactus

Mammillaria columbiana is a species of cactus in the subfamily Cactoideae.
