= Lens Aboudou =

French basketball player (born 1990)

No. 22 – JDA Dijon Basket
- Position: Guard
- League: basketligaen

Personal information
- Born: 9 February 1990 (age 36) Colombes, France
- Listed height: 6 ft 3 in (1.91 m)
- Listed weight: 194 lb (88 kg)

Career information
- Playing career: 2008–present

Career history
- 2008–2009: Paris-Levallois Basket
- 2009: JDA Dijon Basket
- 2023–present: BK Amager

Lens Aboudou (born 9 February 1990) is a French basketball player who currently plays for JDA Dijon Basket of the LNB Pro A.
