= Yma Sumac =

Peruvian singer (1922–2008)

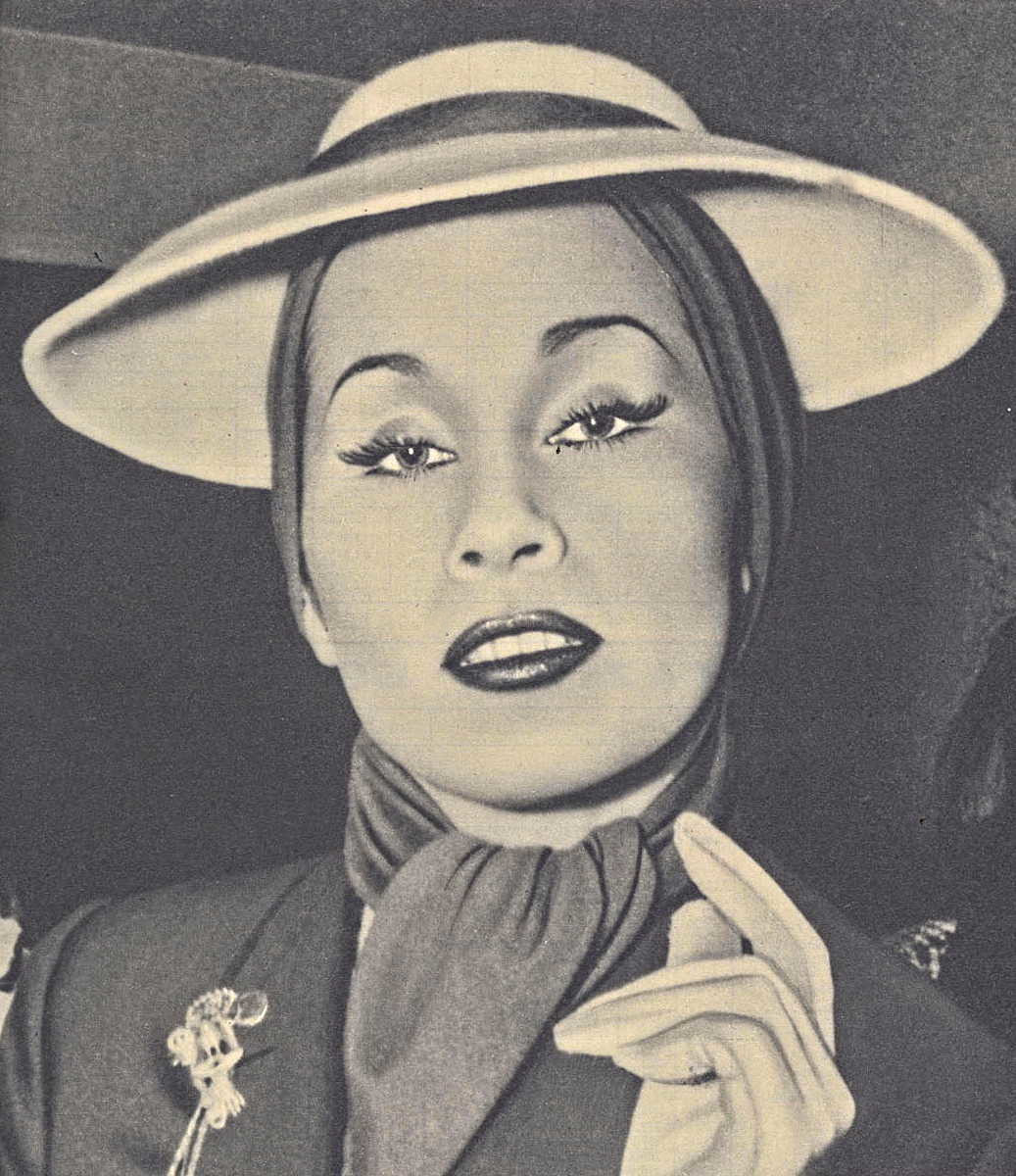
- Sumac in 1954

Background information
- Born: Zoila Emperatriz Chávarri Castillo; September 13, 1922; Callao, Peru
- Died: November 1, 2008 (aged 86) Los Angeles, California, U.S.
- Genres: Music of Peru; aria; lounge; exotica; Latin jazz; mambo; rock; dance
- Occupations: Vocalist, actress, model, composer and musical producer
- Years active: 1938–1976, 1984–1997

Zoila Emperatriz Chávarri Castillo (September 13, 1922 – November 1, 2008), known as Yma Sumac (from Quechua "Ima sumaq", meaning "how beautiful"), was a Peruvian-born vocalist, actress, model, musical composer and producer. She won a Guinness World Record for the Greatest Range of Musical Value in 1956. She has also been called "Queen of Exotica" and is considered a pioneer of world music.

Her debut album, Voice of the Xtabay (1950), peaked at number one on the Billboard 200, selling a million copies in the United States, and its single, "Virgin of the Sun God (Taita Inty)", was a big seller in the United Kingdom, becoming an international success in the 1950s. Subsequent albums including Legend of the Sun Virgin (1952), Fuego del Ande (1959) and Mambo! (1955), were also successful. In 1951, Sumac became the first Latin American and Peruvian female singer to debut on Broadway.

In "Chuncho (The Forest Creatures)" (1953), she developed her own technical singing, named "double voice" or "triple coloratura". During the same period, she performed at Carnegie Hall and Lewisohn Stadium. In 1960, she became the first Latin American woman to get a phonograph record star on the Hollywood Walk of Fame. Afterwards she toured the Soviet Union, selling more than 20 million tickets.

According to Variety in 1974, Sumac had more than 3,000 concerts "covering the entire globe", breaking any previous records by a performer. Fashion magazine V listed her as one of the top nine international fashion icons of all time in 2010. She sold over 40 million records, making her the best-selling Peruvian singer in history.

== Early life ==
Sumac was born Zoila Emperatriz Chávarri Castillo on September 13, 1922, in Callao, Peru. Then the family (a middle class one) moved to Cajamarca, where she spent her childhood. Her parents were the civic leader Sixto Chávarri (Cajamarca) and the schoolteacher Emilia Castillo (Ancash). Sumac was the youngest of six children. Growing up with the air of the Andean mountains, imitating the birds and other animals, she was "unintentionally making" her huge vocal range. In 1934, she traveled to live in Lima with relatives. After being privately tutored from the age of 5, she entered a Catholic school in 1935.

== Career ==
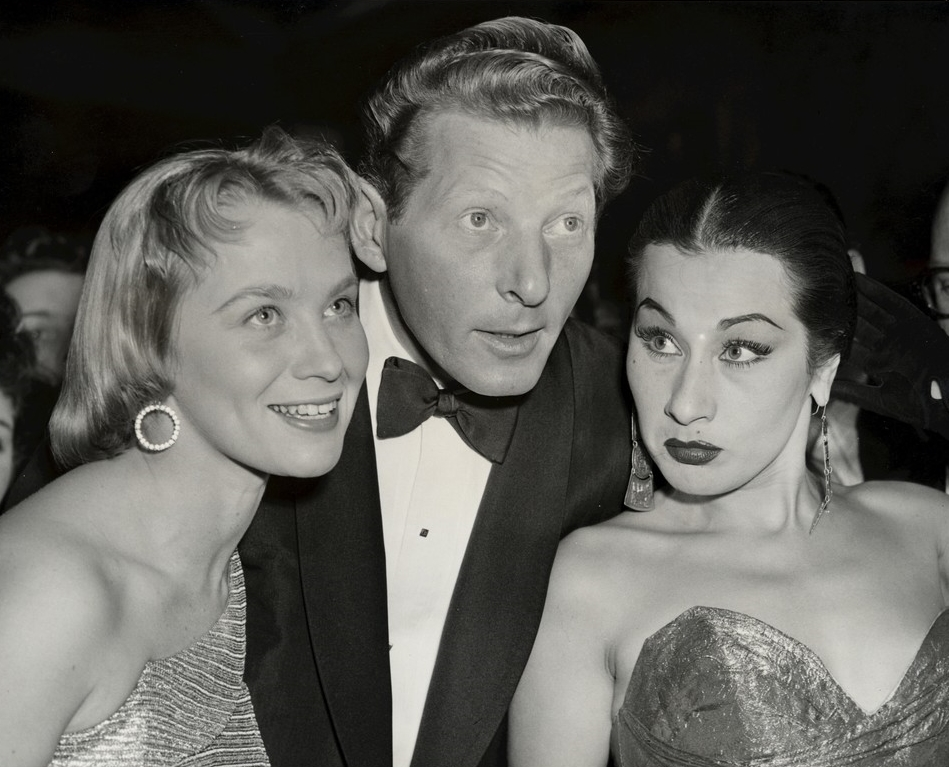
Mai Zetterling, Danny Kaye and Yma Sumac during the 1950s

Probably Sumac's first public appearance was on August 16, 1938, with Moises Vivanco in a religious festival at Callao. She graduated high school in 1940. She recorded at least 18 tracks of Peruvian folk songs in Buenos Aires, Argentina in 1943. These early recordings for the Odeon label featured composer Moisés Vivanco's troupe Compañía Peruana de Arte, of 16 Peruvian dancers, singers, and musicians.

She was discovered by American composer Les Baxter, a pioneer of exotica, and signed to Capitol Records in 1950, at which time she adopted the name Yma Sumac. Her first album, Voice of the Xtabay, launched a period of fame that included performances at the Hollywood Bowl and Carnegie Hall.

In 1950, she made her first tour to Europe and Africa, and debuted at the Royal Albert Hall in London and the Royal Festival Hall before the future Queen Elizabeth II. She presented more than 80 concerts in London and 16 concerts in Paris. A second tour took her to the Far East: Persia, Afghanistan, Pakistan, Burma, Thailand, Sumatra, the Philippines, and Australia. Her fame in countries like Greece, Israel and Russia made her change her two-week stay to six months. During the 1950s, she produced a series of best-selling recordings of lounge music featuring Hollywood-style arrangements of Incan and South American folk songs, working with Baxter and Billy May. The combination of her extraordinary voice, exotic looks, and stage personality made her a hit with American audiences. Sumac appeared in a Broadway musical, Flahooley, in 1951, as a foreign princess who brings Aladdin's lamp to an American toy factory to have it repaired. The show's score was by Sammy Fain and Yip Harburg, but her three numbers were the work of Vivanco, with one co-written by Vivanco and Fain. Flahooley closed quickly, but the Capitol recording of the show continues to sell well as a cult classic, in part because it also marked the Broadway debut of Barbara Cook.

The 1950s were the years of Sumac's greatest popularity; She played Carnegie Hall, the Roxy Theatre with Danny Kaye, Las Vegas nightclubs and concert tours of South America and Europe. She put out a number of hit albums for Capitol Records, such as Mambo! (1954) and Fuego del Ande (1959). During the height of Sumac's popularity, she appeared in the films Secret of the Incas (1954) with Charlton Heston and Robert Young, and Omar Khayyam (1957).

Comparison of vocal ranges

She became a U.S. citizen on July 22, 1955. In 1959, she performed Jorge Bravo de Rueda's classic song "Vírgenes del Sol" on her album Fuego del Ande. In 1957 Sumac and Vivanco divorced, after Vivanco sired twins with another woman. They remarried that same year, but a second divorce followed in 1965. Apparently due to financial difficulties, Sumac and the original Inka Taky Trio went on a world tour in 1960, which lasted for five years. They performed in 40 cities in the Soviet Union for over six months, and a film was shot recording some moments of the tour, and afterward throughout Europe, Asia and Latin America. Their performance in Bucharest, Romania, was recorded as the album Recital, her only live record. Sumac spent the rest of the 1960s performing sporadically.

== Personal life ==
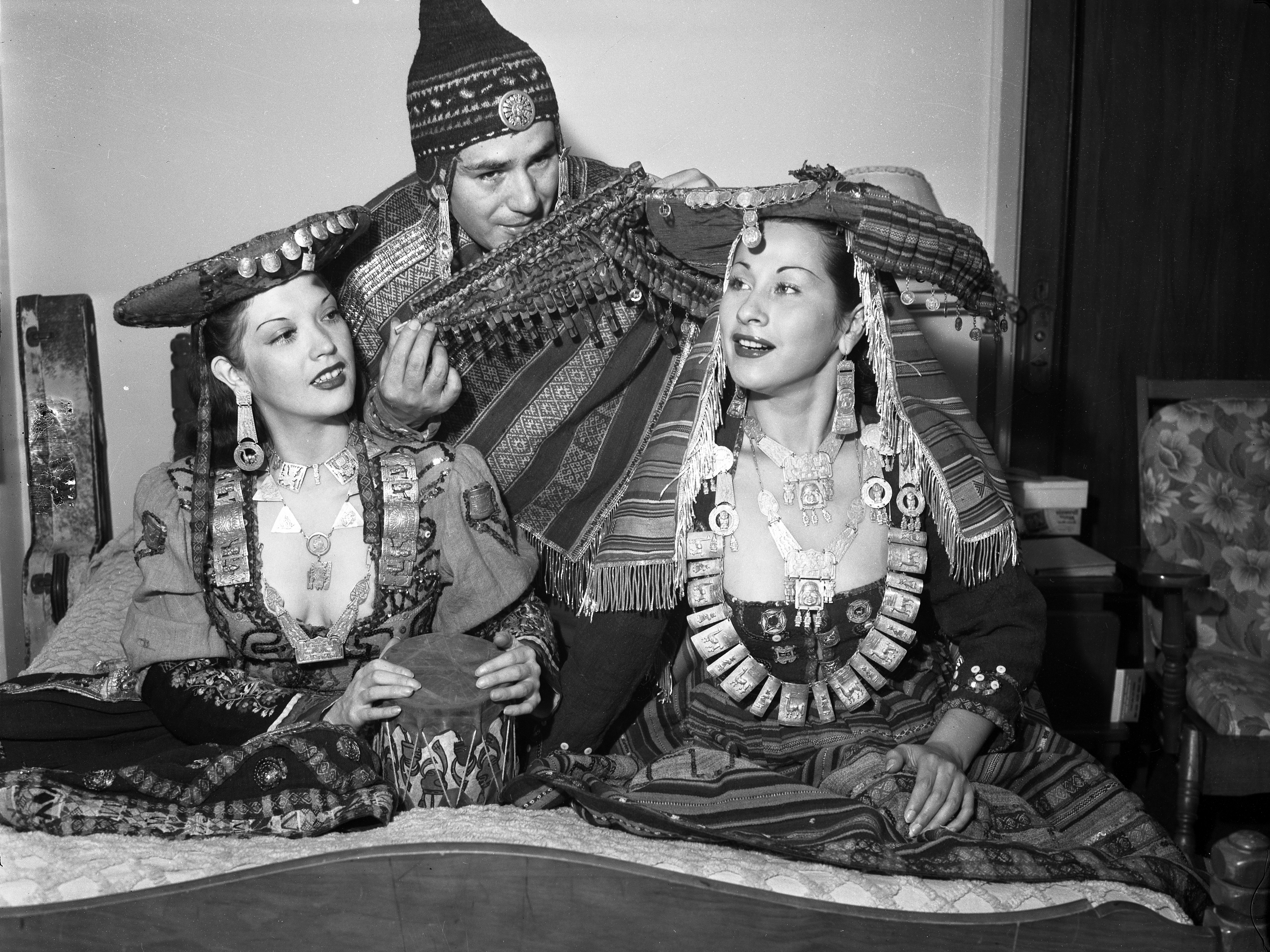
Sumac (right) with Vivanco and Rivero, 1947

She married Moisés Vivanco on June 6, 1942. After this date, Moisés and Yma toured South America and Mexico as a group of fourteen musicians called Imma Sumack and the Conjunto Folklorico Peruano. Some people in Peru did not appreciate her style of singing, most notably the writer José María Arguedas (La Prensa, 1944). In 1946, Sumac and Vivanco moved to New York City, where they performed as the Inka Taqui Trio, Sumac singing soprano, Vivanco on guitar, and her cousin, Cholita Rivero, singing contralto and dancing. The group was unable to attain any success; however, their participation in the South American Music Festival in Carnegie Hall was reviewed positively. In 1949, Yma gave birth to their only child, Carlos.

== Vocal range ==
Sumac had a five-octave vocal range according to some reports, but other reports (and recordings) document four-and-a-half at the peak of her singing career. Shortly after her death, the BBC noted that a typical trained singer has a range of about three octaves.

In 1954, the American composer and music critic Virgil Thomson described Sumac's voice as "very low and warm, very high and birdlike," noting that her range "is very close to five octaves, but is in no way inhuman or outlandish in sound."

== Later career ==
In 1971, Sumac released a rock album, Miracles. She performed in concert from time to time during the 1970s in Peru and later in New York at the Chateau Madrid and Town Hall. In the 1980s, she resumed her career under the management of Alan Eichler, and had a number of concerts both in the United States and abroad, including the Hollywood Roosevelt Cinegrill, New York's Ballroom in 1987 (where she was held over for seven weeks to standing-room only crowds) and several San Francisco shows at the Theatre on the Square among others. In 1987, she recorded "I Wonder" from the Disney film Sleeping Beauty for Stay Awake, an album of songs from Disney movies, produced by Hal Willner. She sang "Ataypura" during a March 19, 1987, appearance on Late Night with David Letterman. She recorded a new German "techno" dance record, "Mambo ConFusion".

In 1989, she sang again at the Ballroom in New York and returned to Europe for the first time in 30 years to headline the BRT's "Gala van de Gouden Bertjes" New Year's Eve TV special in Brussels as well as the "Etoile Palace" program in Paris hosted by Frederic Mitterrand. In March 1990, she played the role of Heidi in Stephen Sondheim's Follies, in Long Beach, California, her first attempt at serious theater since Flahooley in 1951.

She also gave several concerts in the summer of 1996 in San Francisco and Hollywood as well as two more in Montreal, Canada, in July 1997 as part of the Montreal International Jazz Festival. In 1992, she declined to appear in a documentary for German television entitled Yma Sumac – Hollywoods Inkaprinzessin (Yma Sumac – Hollywood's Inca Princess). With the resurgence of lounge music in the late 1990s, Sumac's profile rose again when the song "Ataypura" was featured in the Coen Brothers film The Big Lebowski.

Her song "Bo Mambo" appeared in a commercial for Kahlúa liquor and was sampled for the song "Hands Up" by The Black Eyed Peas. The song "Gopher Mambo" was used in the films Ordinary Decent Criminal, Happy Texas, Spy Games, and Confessions of a Dangerous Mind, among others. "Gopher Mambo" was used in an act of the Cirque Du Soleil show Quidam, as a musical motif in the Russian show Kukhnya (along with "Bo Mambo" and "Taki Rari"), and in an iPhone commercial in 2020. The songs "Goomba Boomba" and "Malambo No. 1" appeared in Death to Smoochy. A sample from "Malambo No.1" was used in Robin Thicke's "Everything I Can't Have". Sumac is also mentioned in the lyrics of the 1980s song "Joe le taxi" by Vanessa Paradis, and her album Mambo! is the record that Belinda Carlisle pulls out of its jacket in the video for "Mad About You". "Gopher Mambo" is used as the opening song in the British version of the television series Ten Percent.

On May 6, 2006, Sumac flew to Lima, where she was presented the Orden del Sol award by Peruvian President Alejandro Toledo and the Jorge Basadre medal by the Universidad Nacional Mayor de San Marcos.

== Death ==
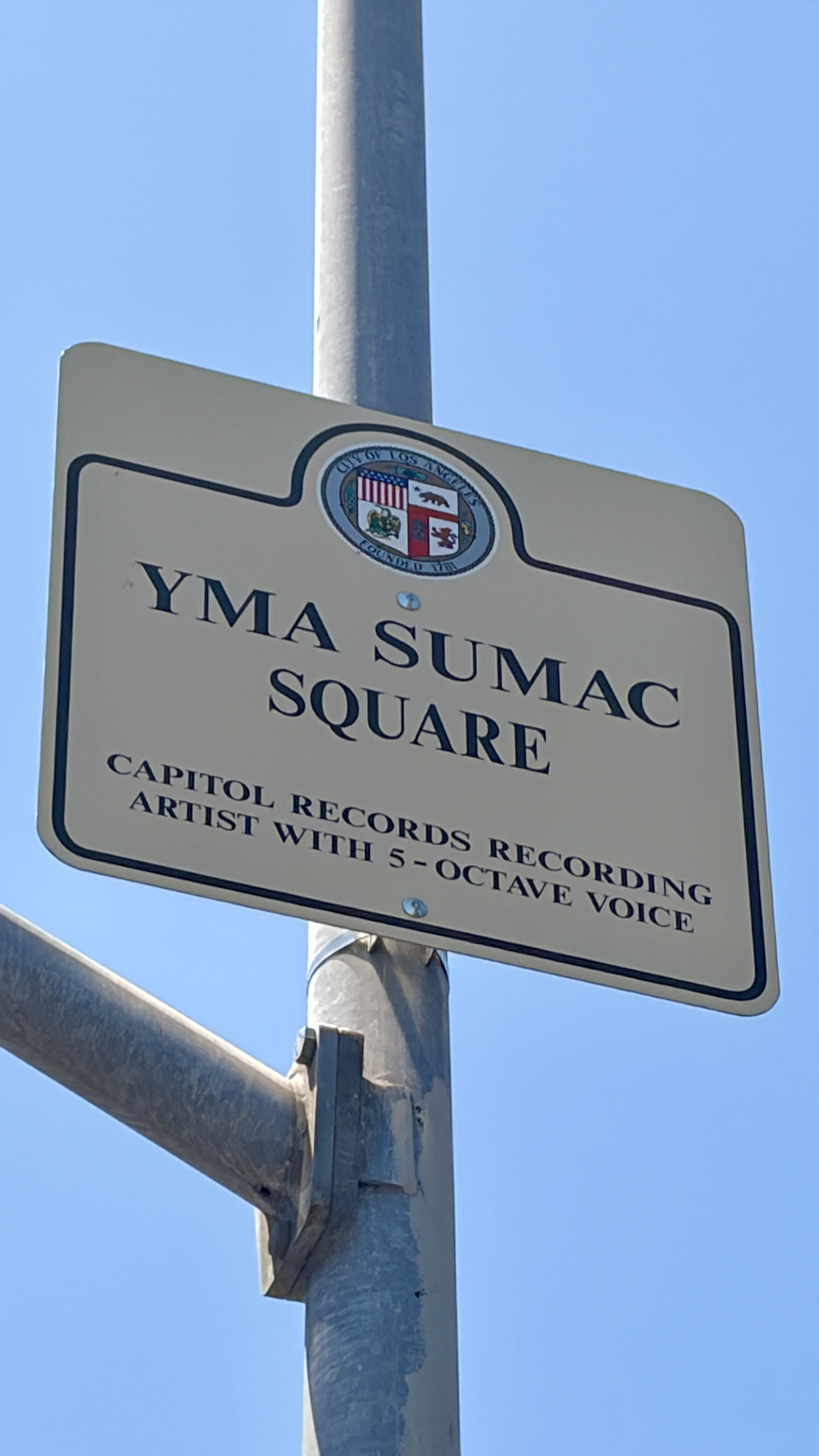
Yma Sumac Square at Hollywood

Sumac died on November 1, 2008, aged 86, at an assisted living home in Los Angeles, California, nine months after being diagnosed with colon cancer. She was interred at the Hollywood Forever Cemetery in the "Sanctuary of Memories" section.

On September 13, 2016, a Google Doodle depicted Sumac.

On September 20, 2022, a new memorial bust statue was unveiled at her final resting place, at the Hollywood Forever Cemetery, in honor of what would have been her 100th birthday.

== Myths ==
Stories published in the 1950s claimed that she was an Inca princess directly descended from Atahualpa, the last Inca emperor. The government of Peru in 1946 formally supported her claim to be descended from Atahualpa, the last Incan emperor. However, her biographer, Nicholas E. Limansky, claimed that "Hollywood took this nice girl who wanted to be a folk singer, dressed her up and said she was a princess. And she acted like it."

For years, rumors circulated that Sumac was a housewife from Brooklyn whose real name was "Amy Camus", which she reversed to become Yma Sumac. The origin of the rumor may plausibly be traced to a December 1950 review by influential jazz critic Leonard Feather, which also suggested that Sumac's recorded voice was in fact a theremin and that "Xtabay" was Pig Latin for "Baxter".

== Discography ==
A 1943 recording session in Argentina included 23 songs, released on 78 rpm on Odeon Records. Sumac's 1952 album Legend of the Sun Virgin was reissued in 2020 (digitally and on vinyl records) by Madrid label Ellas Rugen (Ladies Who Roar) Records, dedicated to the greatest female Latin American singers of the second half of the 20th century.

=== Albums ===
- Voice of the Xtabay (Capitol, 1950)
- Legend of the Sun Virgin (Capitol, 1952)
- Inca Taqui (Capitol, 1953)
- Mambo! (Capitol, 1954)
- Legend of the Jivaro (Capitol, 1957)
- Fuego Del Ande (Capitol, 1959)
- Recital (Electrecord, 1961)
- Miracles (London, 1971)

=== Compilations ===
- The Spell of Yma Sumac (Pair, 1987)
- Amor Indio (Saludos Amigos, 1994)
- Shou Condor (Promo Sound, 1997)
- The Ultimate Yma Sumac Collection (Capitol, 2000)
- Virgin of the Sun God (Old Fashion, 2002)
- The Exotic Sounds of Yma Sumac (Sounds of the World, 2002)
- Queen of Exotica (Universe, 2005)

== Filmography (partial) ==
Year	Title	Role	Notes
1954	Secret of the Incas	Kori-Tica	performs "Taita Inty", "Tumpa!", "Ataypura!"
1957	Omar Khayyam	Karina	performs "Lament"
1958	Música de siempre	Herself	performs "Chuncho"
1960	Las canciones unidas	Herself	performs "Taita Inty"

== Accolades and honors ==
Year	Ceremony/Award	Category/Notes	Result	Ref.
1993	Diamond Halo	Contributions to entertainment	Awarded	
1968	Golden Disc of Hollywood Award	Best Latin American Singer	Won	
1960	Guinness World Records	Greatest Range	Awarded	
1960	Hollywood Walk of Fame	Walk of Stars	Awarded	
1997	Life Achievement Award	—N/a	Awarded	
2006	Order of the Sun of Peru	Presented by Republic of Peru	Awarded	
