= Colombes =

- Commune
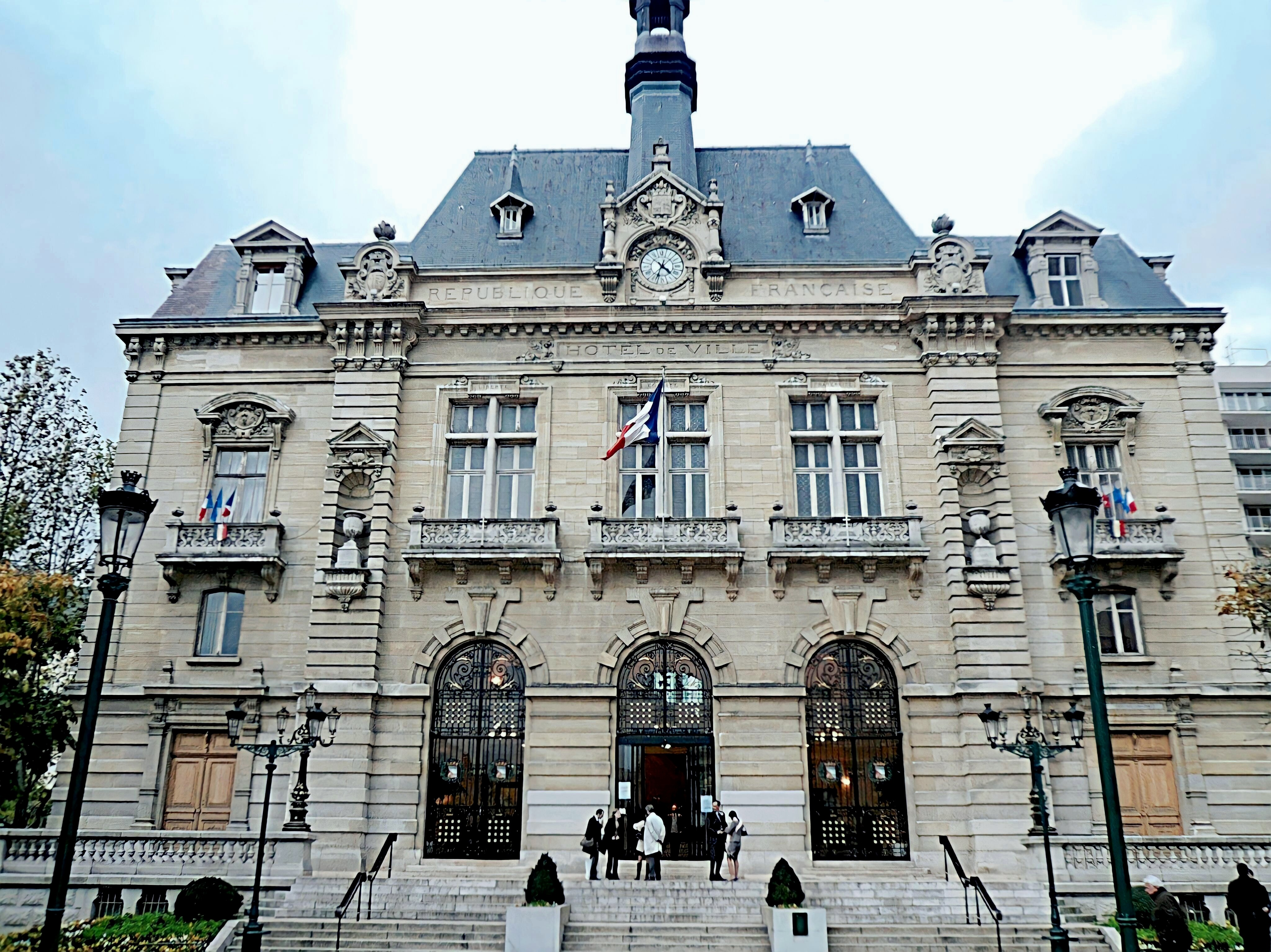
- The Hôtel de Ville (town hall)

- Coat of arms

- Location (in red) within Paris inner suburbs
- Location of Colombes
- Location within France Location within Île-de-France (region)
- Coordinates: 48°55′25″N 2°15′08″E
- Country: France
- Region: Île-de-France
- Department: Hauts-de-Seine
- Arrondissement: Nanterre
- Canton: Colombes-1 and 2
- Intercommunality: Grand Paris

Government
  - Mayor (2026–32): Joakim Giacomoni
- Area^{1}: 7.81 km^{2} (3.02 sq mi)
- Highest elevation: 44 m (144 ft)
- Lowest elevation: 23 m (75 ft)
- Population (2023): 91,053
  - Density: 11,700/km^{2} (30,200/sq mi)
- Time zone: UTC+01:00 (CET)
  - Summer (DST): UTC+02:00 (CEST)
- INSEE/Postal code: 92025 /92700
- ^{1} French Land Register data, which excludes lakes, ponds, glaciers > 1 km^{2} (0.386 sq mi or 247 acres) and river estuaries.

Colombes (French pronunciation: [kɔlɔ̃b]) is a commune in the northwestern suburbs of Paris, France, 10.6 km (6.6 mi) from the centre of Paris. In 2019, Colombes was the 53rd largest city in France.

== Name ==
The name Colombes comes from Latin columna (Old French colombe), meaning "column". This is interpreted as referring either to a megalithic column used in ancient times by a druidic cult which stood in Colombes until its destruction during the French Revolution, or to the columns of an atrium in a ruined Gallo-Roman villa that also stood in Colombes.

== History ==
During the repression of January and February 1894, the police conducted raids targeting the anarchists living there, without much success.

On 13 March 1896, 17% of the territory of Colombes was detached and became the commune of Bois-Colombes (lit. 'Colombes Woods'). On 2 May 1910, 19% of the (reduced) territory of Colombes was detached and became the commune of La Garenne-Colombes. Thus, the commune of Colombes is now only two-thirds the size of its territory before 1896. The population data in the table and graph below refer to the commune of Colombes proper, in its geography at the given years. The Hôtel de Ville was completed in 1923.

=== Population ===
Historical population

Year	Pop.	±% p.a.
1793	1,863	—
1800	2,430	+3.87%
1806	1,627	−6.47%
1821	1,584	−0.18%
1831	1,643	+0.37%
1836	1,557	−1.07%
1841	1,548	−0.12%
1846	1,658	+1.38%
1851	1,649	−0.11%
1856	1,906	+2.94%
1861	2,805	+8.03%
1866	3,678	+5.57%
1872	5,133	+5.71%
1876	6,640	+6.65%
1881	9,877	+8.27%
1886	14,254	+7.61%
1891	18,918	+5.82%
1896	16,798	−2.35%
1901	23,061	+6.54%

Year	Pop.	±% p.a.
1906	29,143	+4.79%
1911	22,862	−4.74%
1921	32,271	+3.51%
1926	42,590	+5.71%
1931	57,313	+6.12%
1936	61,944	+1.57%
1946	61,047	−0.15%
1954	67,909	+1.34%
1962	76,918	+1.57%
1968	80,357	+0.73%
1975	83,390	+0.53%
1982	78,777	−0.81%
1990	78,513	−0.04%
1999	76,757	−0.25%
2007	82,552	+0.91%
2012	85,357	+0.67%
2017	85,177	−0.04%
2023	91,053	+1.12%

Source: EHESS and INSEE (1968-2023)

== Geography ==
=== Climate ===
Colombes has an oceanic climate (Köppen climate classification Cfb). The average annual temperature in Colombes is 12.5 °C (54.5 °F). The average annual rainfall is 623.0 mm (24.53 in) with May as the wettest month. The temperatures are highest on average in July, at around 20.6 °C (69.1 °F), and lowest in January, at around 5.0 °C (41.0 °F). The highest temperature ever recorded in Colombes was 40.9 °C (105.6 °F) on 6 August 2003; the coldest temperature ever recorded was −15.0 °C (5.0 °F) on 17 January 1985.

Climate data for Colombes (1981−2010 normals, extremes 1981−2018)
Month	Jan	Feb	Mar	Apr	May	Jun	Jul	Aug	Sep	Oct	Nov	Dec	Year
Record high °C (°F)	16.2 (61.2)	21.0 (69.8)	25.5 (77.9)	31.1 (88.0)	35.0 (95.0)	37.9 (100.2)	40.0 (104.0)	40.9 (105.6)	34.0 (93.2)	30.9 (87.6)	22.0 (71.6)	17.5 (63.5)	40.9 (105.6)
Mean daily maximum °C (°F)	7.6 (45.7)	8.8 (47.8)	12.7 (54.9)	16.2 (61.2)	20.1 (68.2)	23.2 (73.8)	25.8 (78.4)	25.5 (77.9)	21.7 (71.1)	16.8 (62.2)	11.2 (52.2)	7.9 (46.2)	16.5 (61.7)
Daily mean °C (°F)	5.0 (41.0)	5.6 (42.1)	8.7 (47.7)	11.5 (52.7)	15.3 (59.5)	18.3 (64.9)	20.6 (69.1)	20.3 (68.5)	17.0 (62.6)	13.1 (55.6)	8.3 (46.9)	5.5 (41.9)	12.5 (54.5)
Mean daily minimum °C (°F)	2.4 (36.3)	2.4 (36.3)	4.7 (40.5)	6.8 (44.2)	10.5 (50.9)	13.4 (56.1)	15.4 (59.7)	15.2 (59.4)	12.2 (54.0)	9.3 (48.7)	5.5 (41.9)	3.1 (37.6)	8.4 (47.1)
Record low °C (°F)	−15.0 (5.0)	−12.0 (10.4)	−7.0 (19.4)	−2.0 (28.4)	1.9 (35.4)	5.4 (41.7)	9.0 (48.2)	7.9 (46.2)	4.7 (40.5)	−2.2 (28.0)	−6.7 (19.9)	−9.1 (15.6)	−15.0 (5.0)
Average precipitation mm (inches)	49.6 (1.95)	41.4 (1.63)	46.9 (1.85)	46.9 (1.85)	63.7 (2.51)	51.0 (2.01)	58.3 (2.30)	50.2 (1.98)	48.0 (1.89)	61.4 (2.42)	48.1 (1.89)	57.5 (2.26)	623.0 (24.53)
Average precipitation days (≥ 1.0 mm)	10.6	9.0	10.5	9.2	10.0	8.3	8.0	7.2	8.0	9.7	9.8	10.9	111.2
Source: Météo-France

== Administration ==
The city is divided into two cantons:

- Colombes-1 (north)
- Colombes-2 (south)

== Transport ==
Colombes is served by four stations on the Transilien Paris-Saint-Lazare suburban rail line at Colombes, Le Stade, La Garenne-Colombes and Les Vallées.

== Education ==
The commune has 21 preschools and 19 elementary schools.

Secondary schools:

- Junior high schools: Robert Paparemborde, Marguerite Duras, Gay Lussac, Moulin Joly, Jean-Baptiste Clément, Lakanal
- Senior high schools: Lycée Guy de Maupassant, Lycee Polyvalent Claude Garamont, Lycee Polyvalent Anatole de France

== Personalities ==
- Quilapayún, Chilean music group forced into exile in France after the 1973 Coup. They settled in Colombes.
- Jordan Aboudou, basketball player
- Lens Aboudou, basketball player
- Josué Albert, footballer
- Bryan Alceus, footballer
- Mame-Ibra Anne, athlete
- Sandy Baltimore, footballer
- Jean‐Ricner Bellegarde, footballer
- Kelly Berville, footballer
- Zoumana Camara, footballer
- Pierre Clayette, artist
- Mathieu Cossou, karateka
- Simone Jorry, deaf / hard-of-hearing rights activist
- Marie-Antoinette Katoto, footballer
- Manu Koné, footballer
- Eliaquim Mangala, footballer
- Abdoulaye Méïté, footballer
- Claude Mérelle, actress
- Samuel Nadeau, basketball player
- Alexandre Postel (born 1982), writer
- Steven Nzonzi, footballer
- Denise Roger, composer
- Kevin Thalien, basketball player
- Élodie Thomis, footballer
- Axel Tony, singer
- Jonathan Toto, footballer
- Eddy Viator, footballer
- Rama Yade, politician, moved into a council flat in Colombes with her mother and three sisters at the age of fourteen.
- Pierpoljak, reggae singer

== Sport ==
The stadium was built in 1907. Officially named the Stade Olympique Yves-du-Manoir, the Olympic Stadium of Colombes was the site of the opening ceremony and several events of the 1924 Summer Olympics. The arena's capacity was increased to 60,000 for the 1938 World Cup. The stadium lost its importance after the restoration in 1972 of Paris' 49,000-seat Parc des Princes. In the 1990s, three of the four grandstands were torn down due to decay and the stadium's capacity was down to 7,000; later renovations have brought the current capacity to 14,000.

Through November 2017, it had been home to the Racing 92 rugby club, currently playing in France's Top 14, but Racing has since moved to the new U Arena in Nanterre. The RCF Paris football club, which plays in the fourth division, remains at Yves-du-Manoir. The stadium was the field hockey venue at the 2024 Summer Olympics.

== Twin towns ==
- Frankenthal, Germany since 1958
- Legnano, Italy since 1964

== See also ==
- Communes of the Hauts-de-Seine department
