= Bois-Colombes =

- Commune
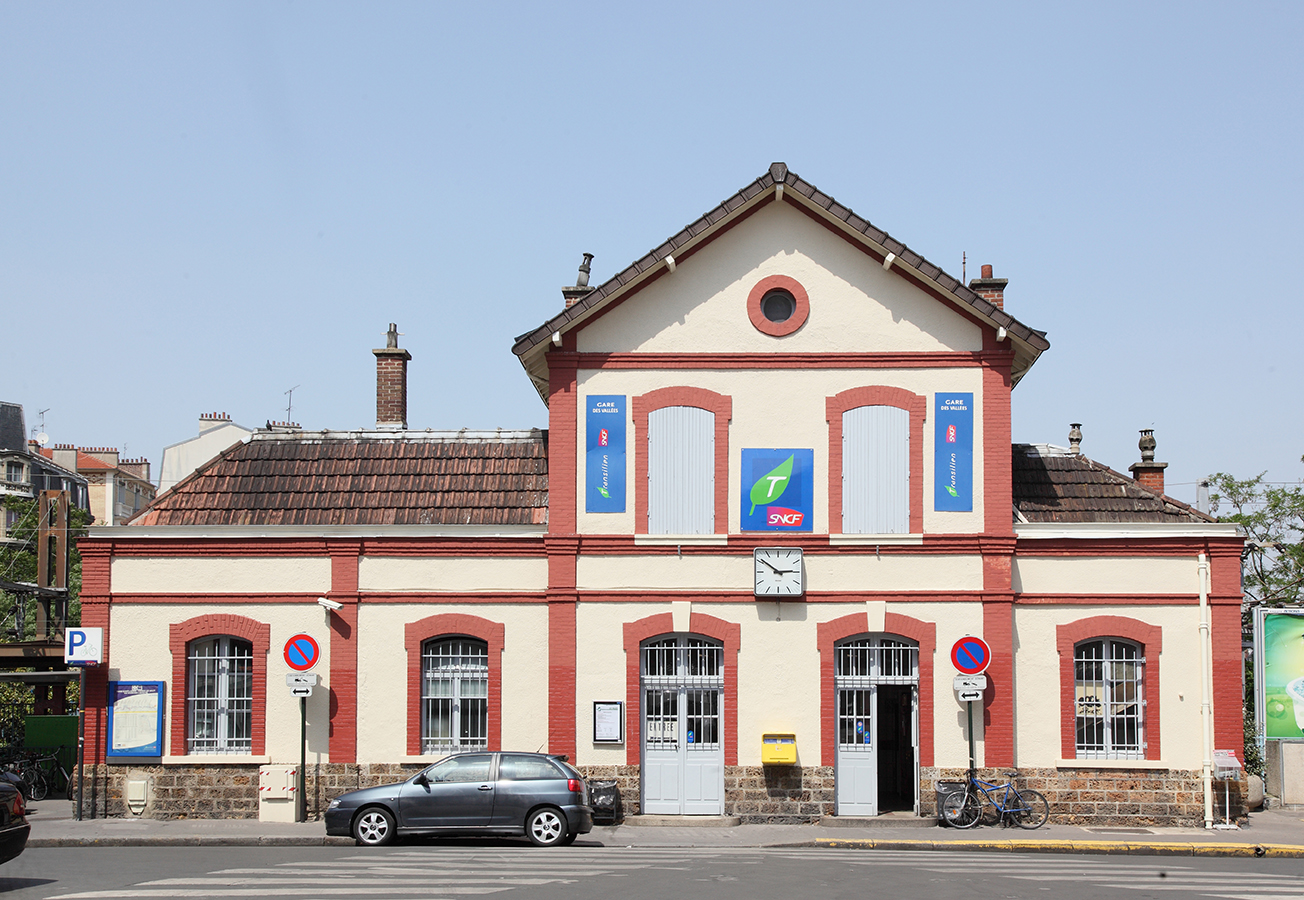
- Les Vallées station

- Coat of arms

- Location (in red) within Paris inner suburbs
- Location of Bois-Colombes
- Location within France Location within Île-de-France (region)
- Coordinates: 48°55′03″N 2°16′06″E
- Country: France
- Region: Île-de-France
- Department: Hauts-de-Seine
- Arrondissement: Nanterre
- Canton: Colombes-2
- Intercommunality: Grand Paris

Government
  - Mayor (2026–32): Pierre Crosnier Leconte
- Area^{1}: 1.92 km^{2} (0.74 sq mi)
- Elevation: 30 m (98 ft)
- Population (2023): 28,909
  - Density: 15,100/km^{2} (39,000/sq mi)
- Time zone: UTC+01:00 (CET)
  - Summer (DST): UTC+02:00 (CEST)
- INSEE/Postal code: 92009 /92270
- ^{1} French Land Register data, which excludes lakes, ponds, glaciers > 1 km^{2} (0.386 sq mi or 247 acres) and river estuaries.

Bois-Colombes (French pronunciation: [bwa kɔlɔ̃b]) is a commune in the Hauts-de-Seine department, in the northwestern suburbs of Paris, France. It is located 9 km (5.6 mi) from the centre of Paris. International companies such as Colgate-Palmolive, IBM and Aviva have their French headquarters in Bois-Colombes.

== History ==
The commune of Bois-Colombes (literally "Dove Woods") was created on 13 March 1896 by detaching its territory from the commune of Colombes. The Hôtel de Ville was completed in 1937.

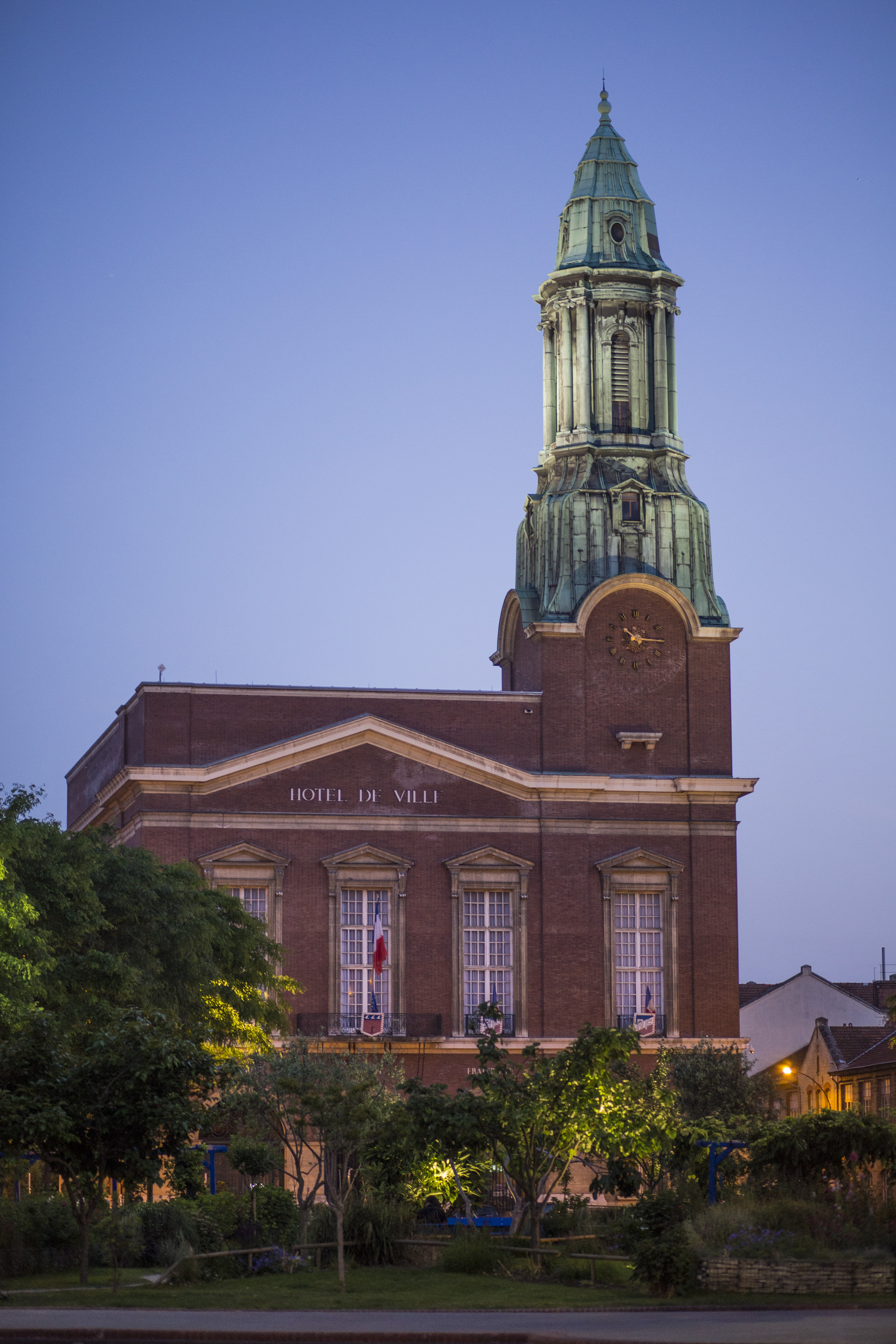
The Hôtel de Ville

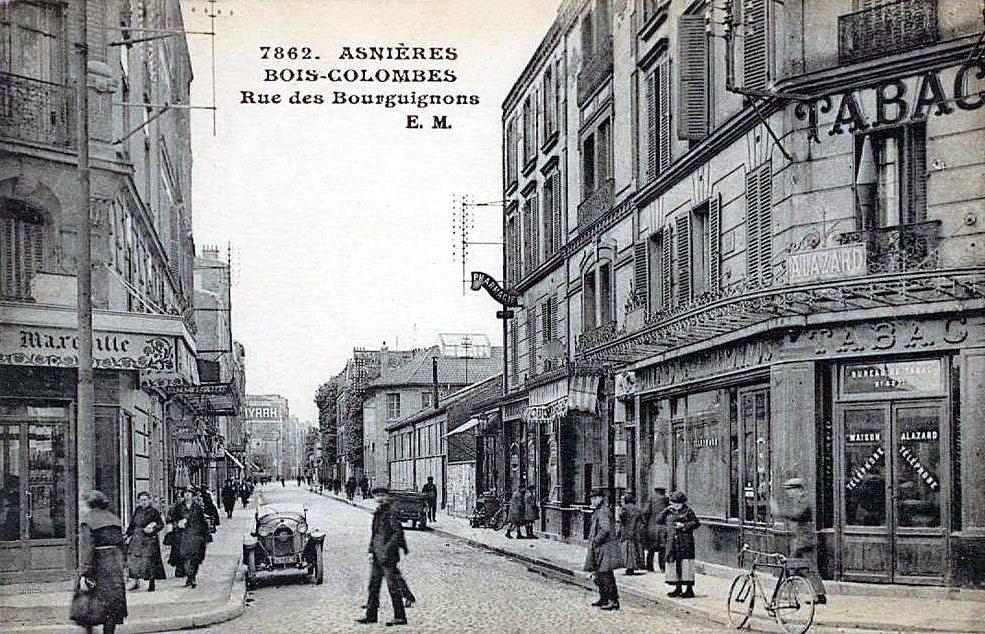
The Rue des Bourguignons c. 1910

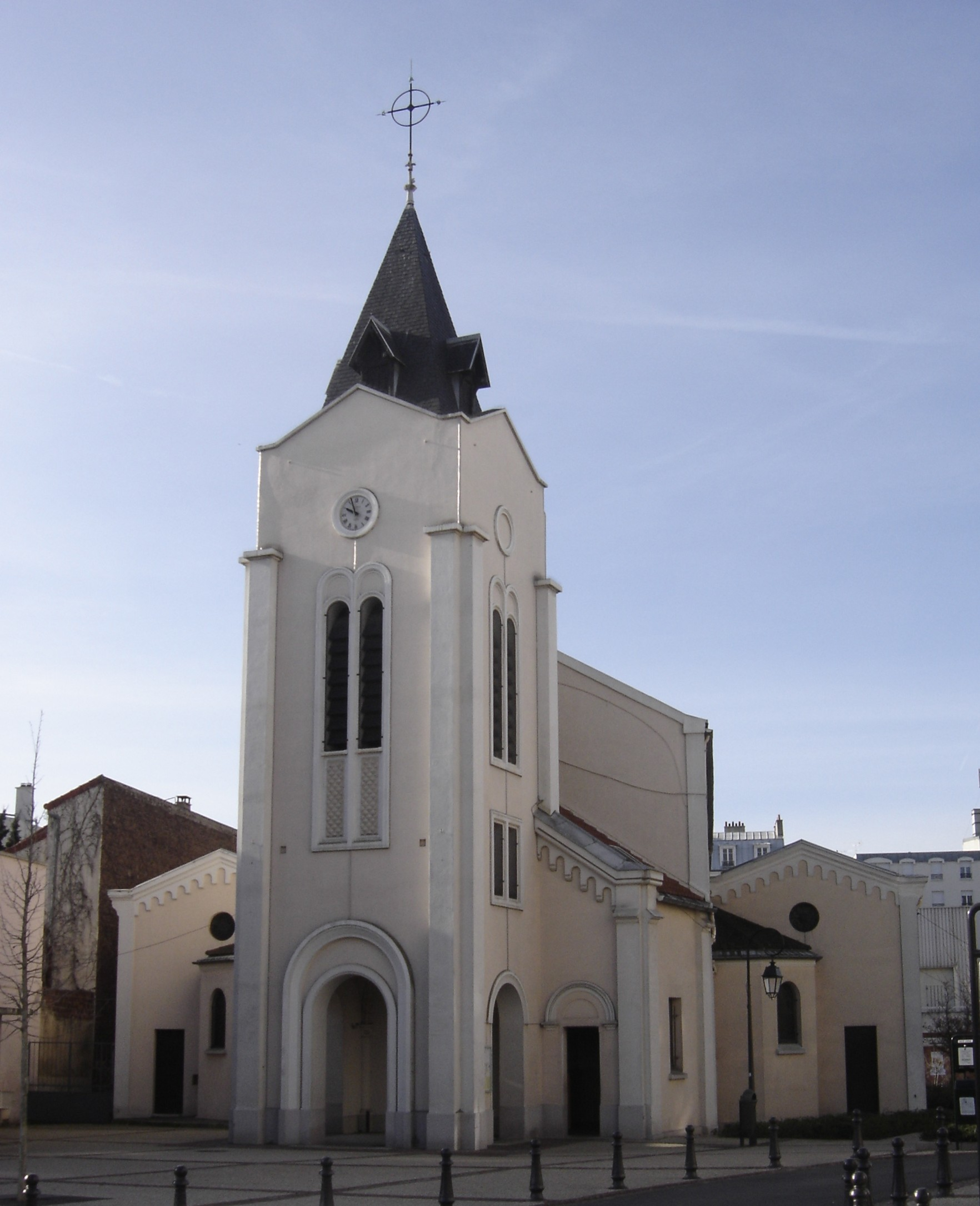
Notre-Dame de Bon Secours

== Population ==
Historical population

Year	Pop.	±% p.a.
1896	10,501	—
1901	12,726	+3.92%
1906	14,695	+2.92%
1911	17,241	+3.25%
1921	19,888	+1.44%
1926	21,924	+1.97%
1931	25,892	+3.38%
1936	26,562	+0.51%
1946	25,754	−0.31%
1954	27,899	+1.01%

Year	Pop.	±% p.a.
1962	29,938	+0.89%
1968	28,934	−0.57%
1975	26,657	−1.16%
1982	23,780	−1.62%
1990	24,415	+0.33%
1999	23,885	−0.24%
2007	27,600	+1.82%
2012	28,709	+0.79%
2017	28,239	−0.33%
2023	28,909	+0.39%

Source: EHESS and INSEE (1968–2023)

== Transport ==
Bois-Colombes is served by two stations on the Transilien Paris-Saint-Lazare suburban rail line: Bois-Colombes and Les Vallées.

== Education ==
The commune has:

- Six combined preschools and primary schools: Françoise-Dolto, Gramme, La Cigogne, Pierre-Joigneaux, Jules-Ferry, Paul-Bert
- One elementary-only school: Saint-Exupéry
- Two junior high schools: Collège Jean-Mermoz and Collège Albert-Camus
- Two senior high schools: Lycée Albert-Camus and Lycée professionnel régional

== Notable people ==
- Henry Charles Litolff, pianist composer and music publisher (5 February 1818 – 5 or 6 August 1891)
- Michel Descombey, ballet dancer and choreographer, born 1930
- René Maillard, composer (8 April 1931 – 4 December 2012)
- Patrick Noubissie, footballer
- Catherine Millet, author and critic
- Henri Betti, composer and pianist married in Bois-Colombes in 1949.
- Bob Sinclar, record producer and DJ

== International relations ==
Bois-Colombes is twinned with:

- Neu-Ulm, Germany

== See also ==
- Communes of the Hauts-de-Seine department
- The statue "jeune fille à la sandale" in Bois-Colombes's square de l'Hôtel de Ville is by the sculptor Pierre Charles Lenoir
