= Les Vallées station =

Railway station in La Garenne-Colombes, France

Les Vallées
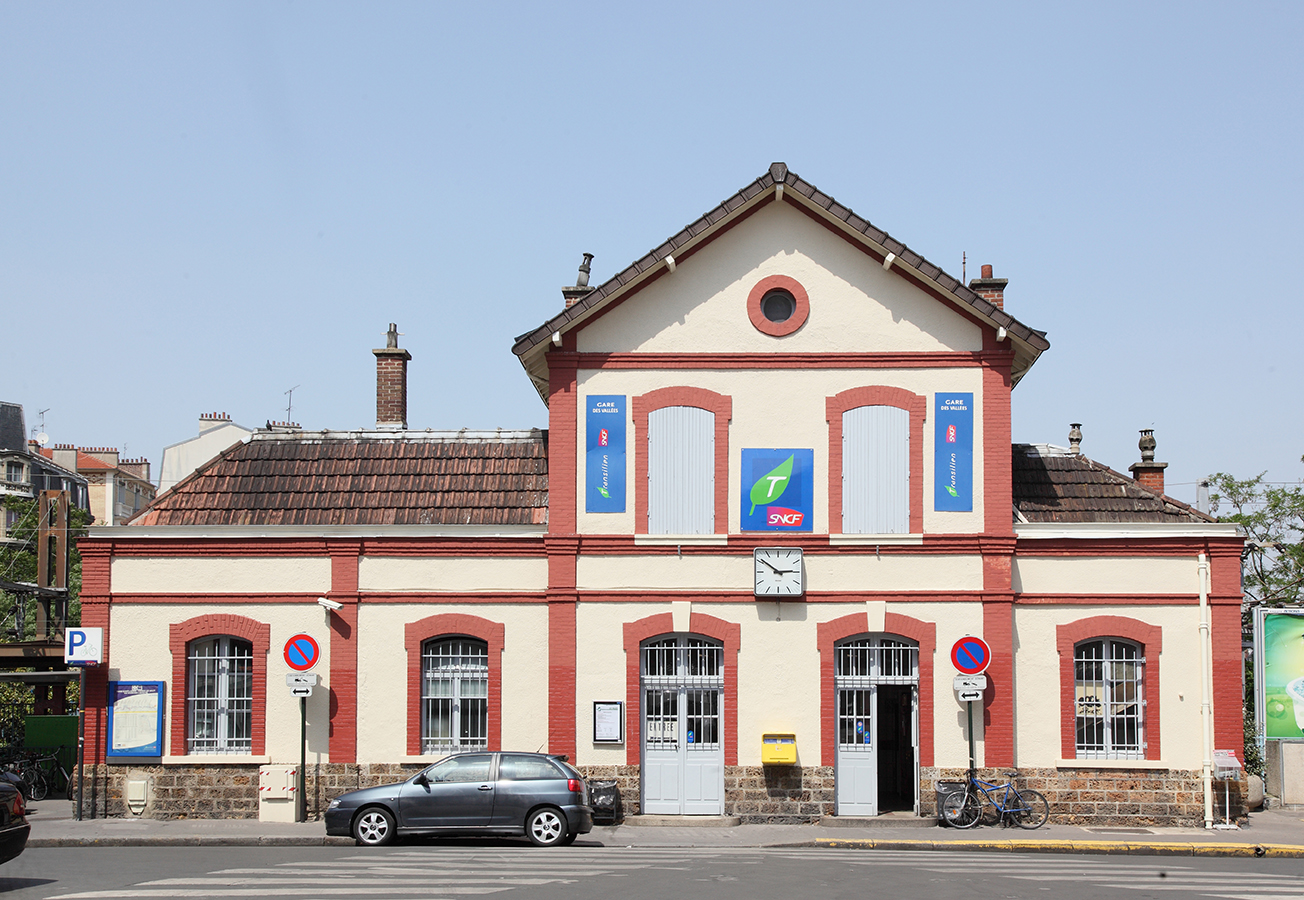
- The passenger building of Les Vallées station in 2012.

General information
- Location: Place de la Gare des Vallées; La Garenne-Colombes, France
- Coordinates: 48°54′48″N 2°15′28″E
- Elevation: 39 metres (128 ft)
- Operator: SNCF
- Line: Paris–Saint-Germain-en-Laye railway
- Platforms: 2 side platforms
- Tracks: 2

Construction
- Structure type: At-grade
- Parking: Yes
- Cycle facilities: Véligo parking station
- Accessible: Yes, by prior reservation

Other information
- Station code: 87386300
- Fare zone: 3

History
- Opened: 15 October 1897

Passengers
- 2024: 5,291,269

Services
Preceding station	Transilien	Following station
La Garenne–Colombes towards Cergy-le-Haut	Line L	Bécon-les-Bruyères towards Paris–Saint Lazare
Location

Les Vallées station (French: Gare des Vallées) is a French Railway station located on the Place de la Gare-des-Vallées in the commune of La Garenne-Colombes, Hauts-de-Seine department in the Île-de-France region. Due to the surrounding density of the stations neighbourhood, it also serves the nearby communes of Bois-Colombes and Colombes. Established at an elevation of 39 meters, the station is located at kilometric point (KP) 6.973 on the Paris-Saint-Lazare—Saint-Germain-en-Laye railway, between the stations of Bécon-les-Bruyères and La Garenne-Colombes.

Opened in 1897 by the Chemins de fer de l'Ouest, the station is now owned and operated by the SNCF. Since 2004, Les Vallées has been served by Transilien Line L to and from Gare Saint-Lazare.

== History ==
=== First station serving Colombes ===
In 1844, a railway station was established at the Pont de la Puce.

=== Ridership ===
In 2021, the SNCF estimated that 4,068,322 passengers traveled through the station.

== Services ==
=== Passenger services ===
Passenger installations in 2018.

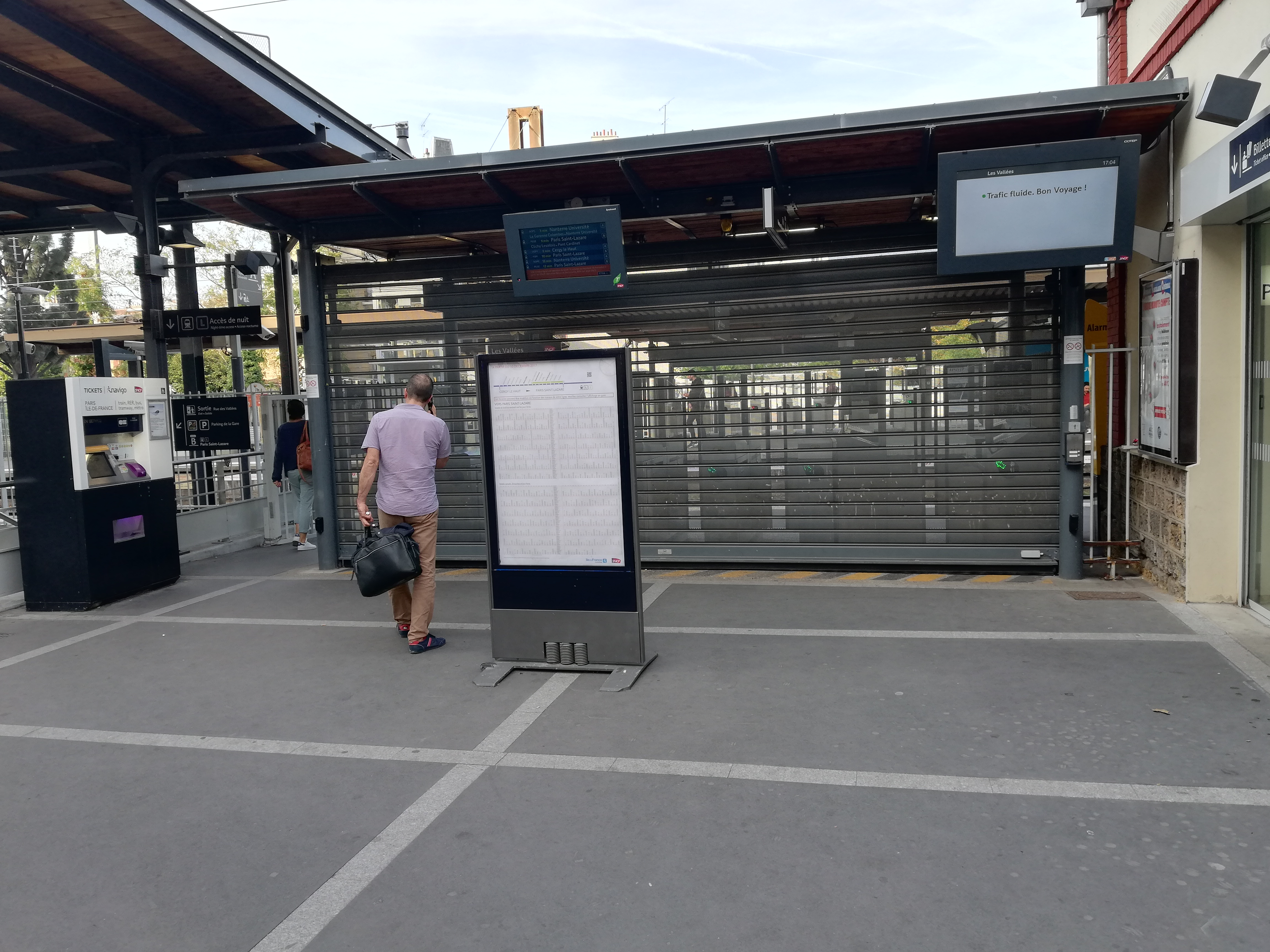
Primary station entrance.

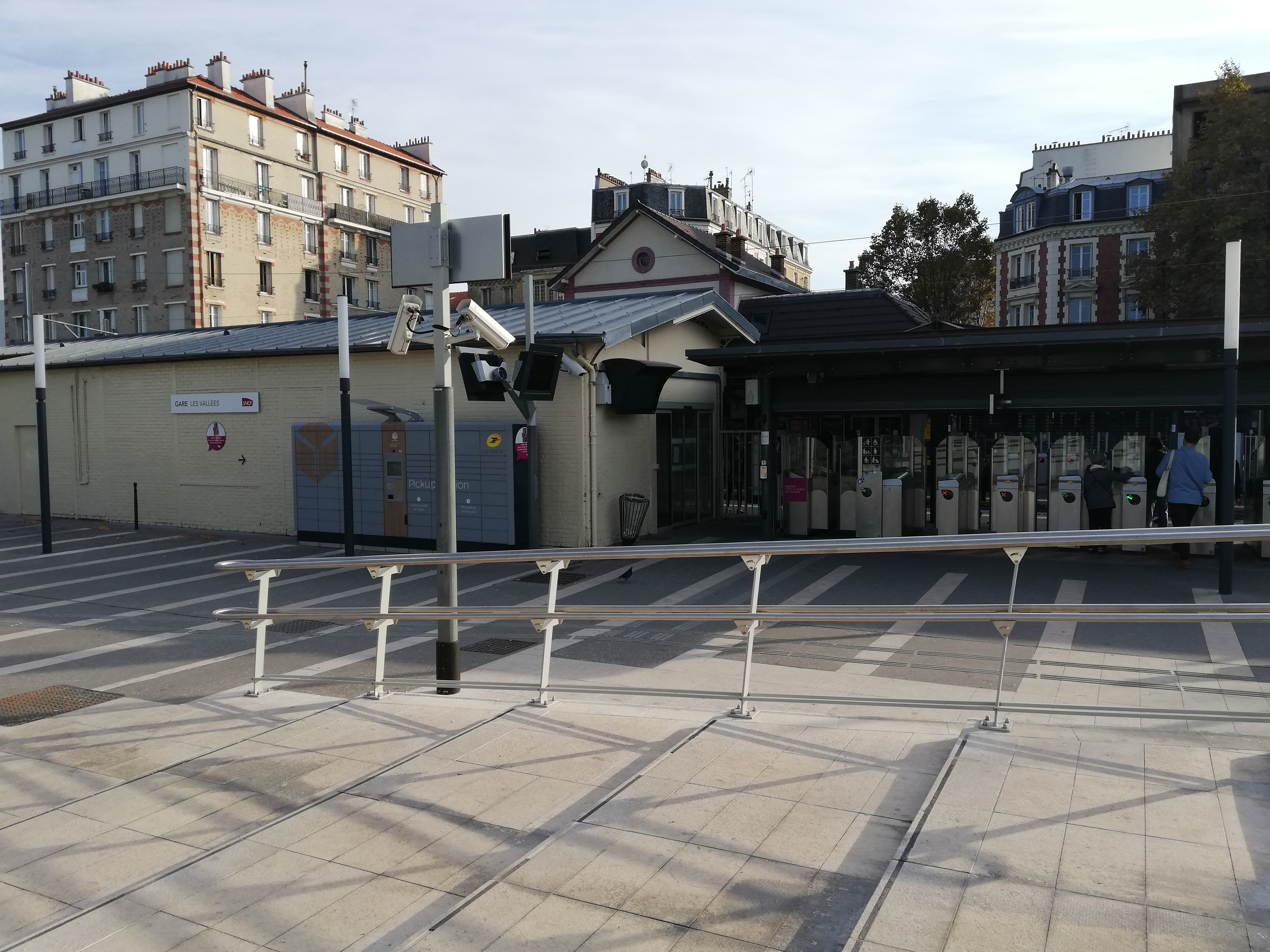
North station entrance.

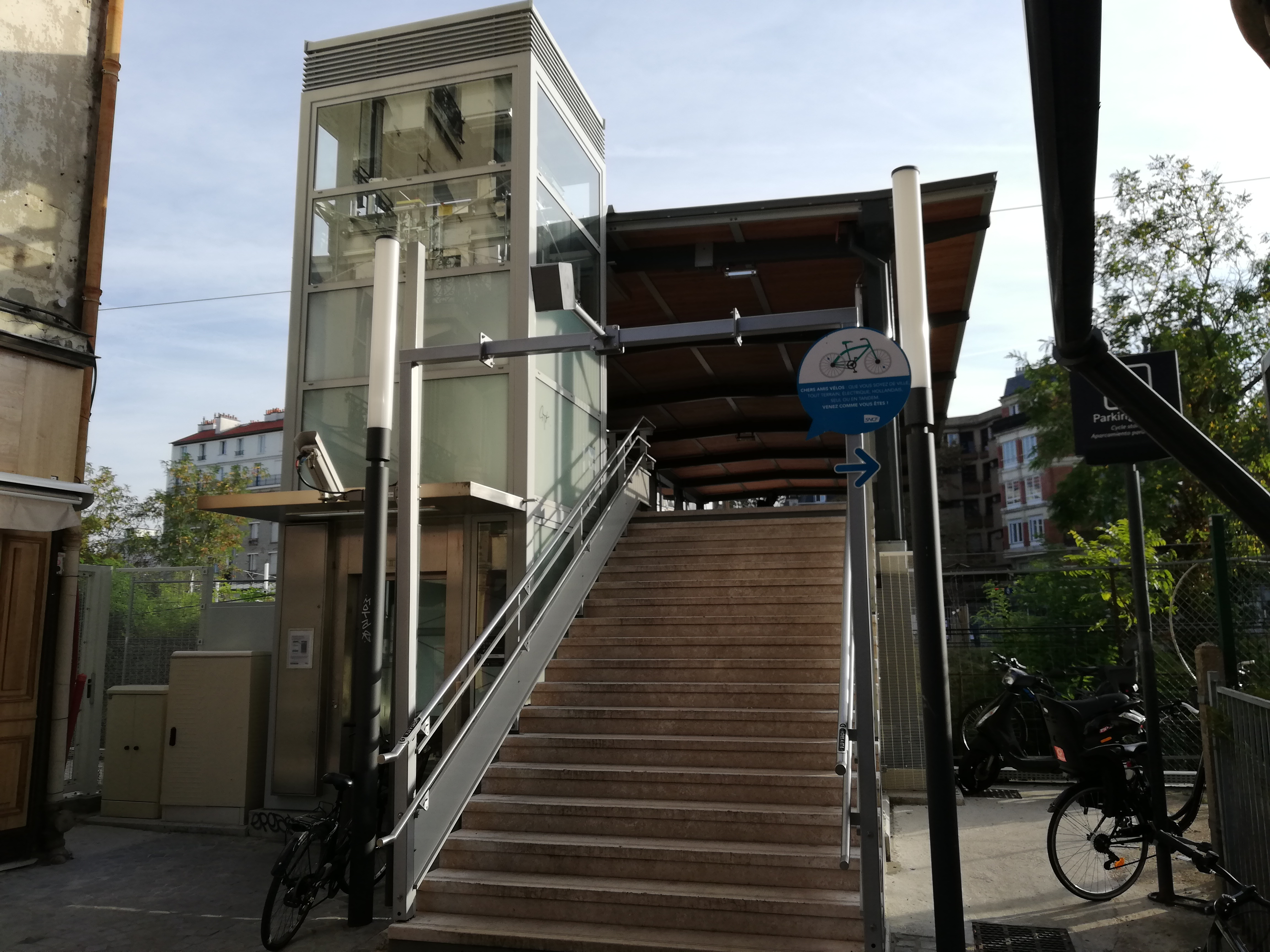
Passenger overpass entrance.

=== Train services ===
Les Vallées station is served by trains running on Line L of the Transilien network. Service levels are guaranteed every 10 minutes at peak hours and every 15 minutes at off-peak hours. Trains stopping at Les Vallées serve all stations between Paris Saint-Lazare and Nanterre-Université, except in the summer when they run non-stop between Paris Saint-Lazare and Bécon-les-Bruyères.

Signage, tracks and platforms in 2018.

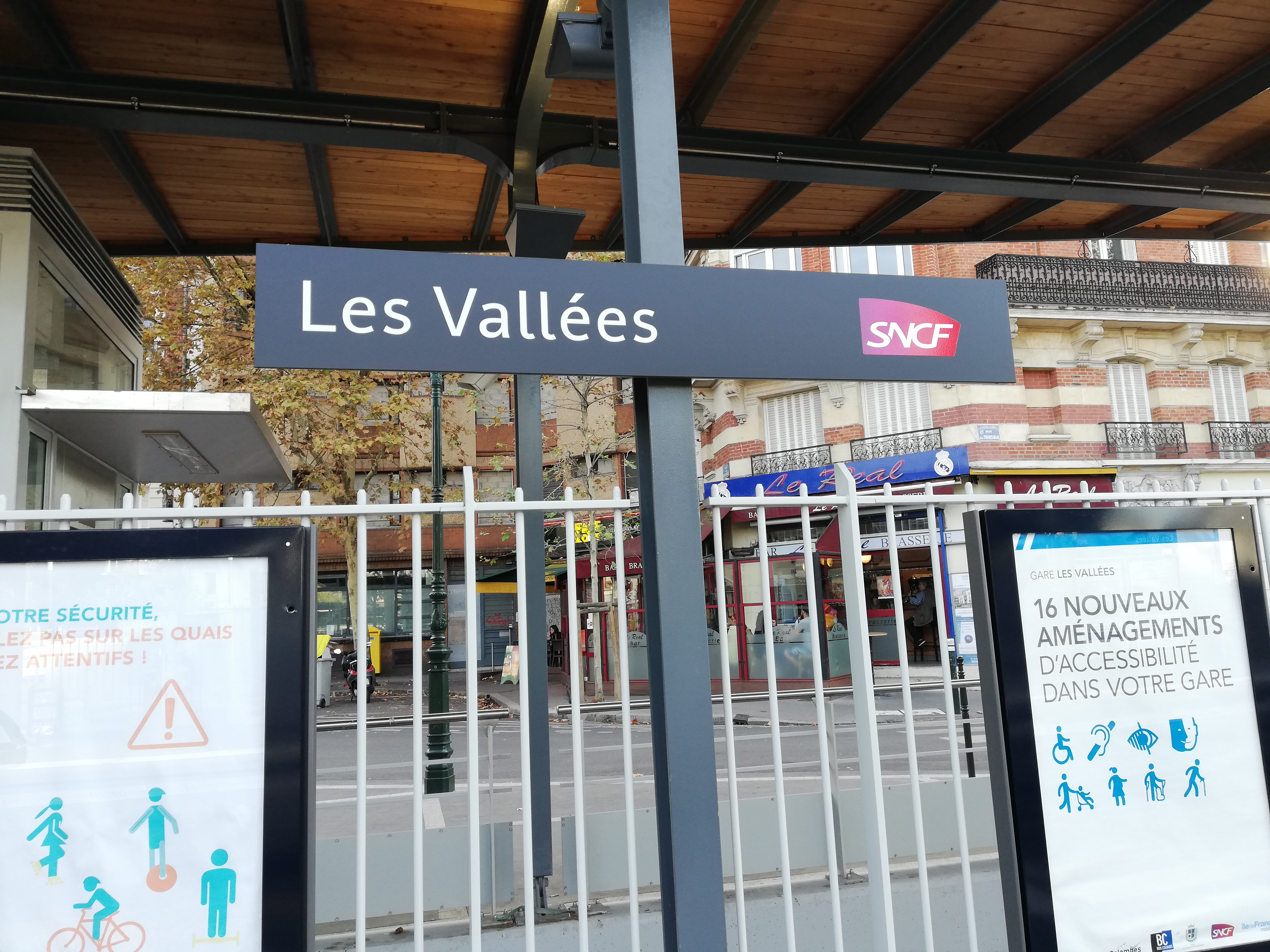

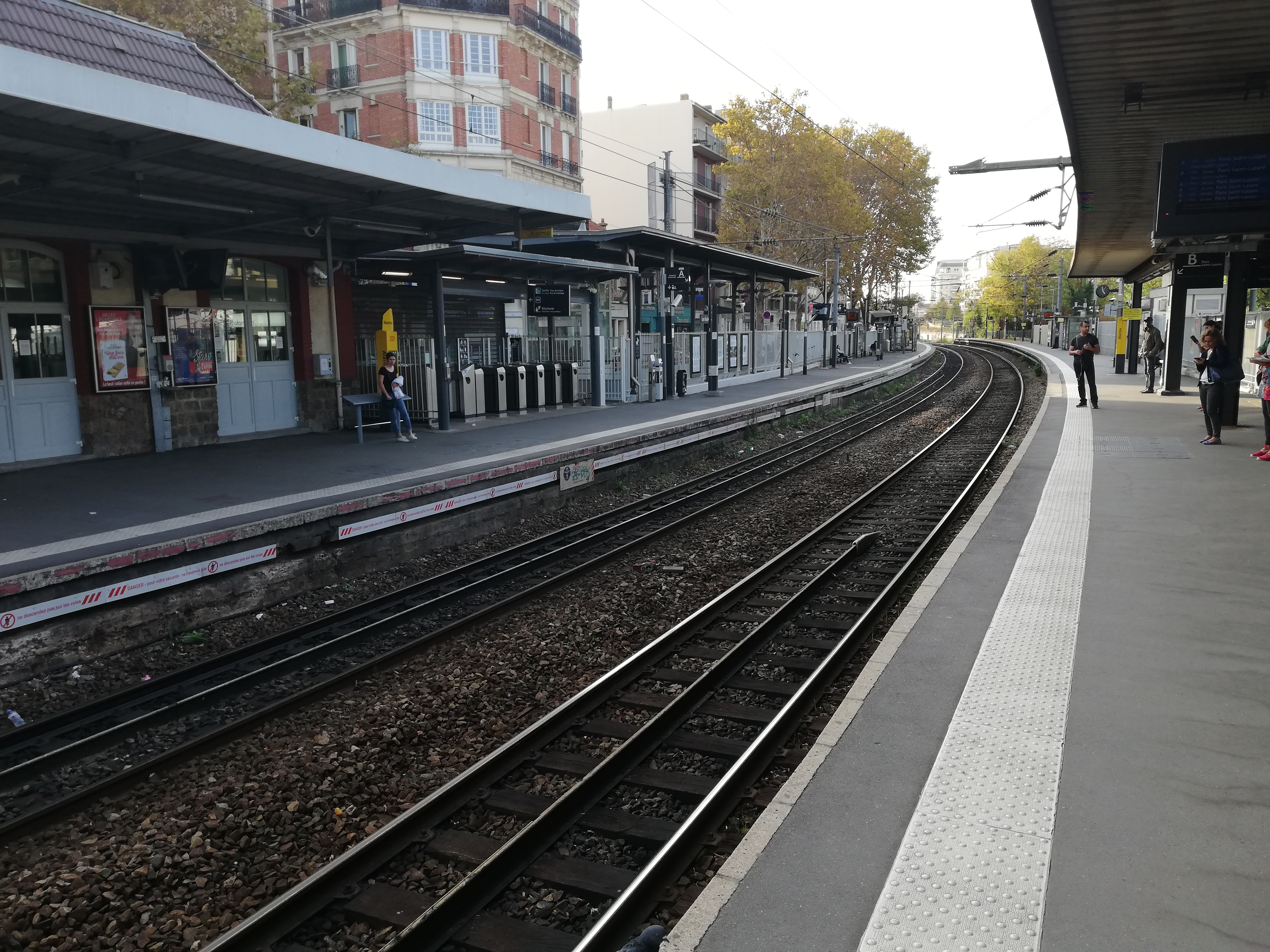

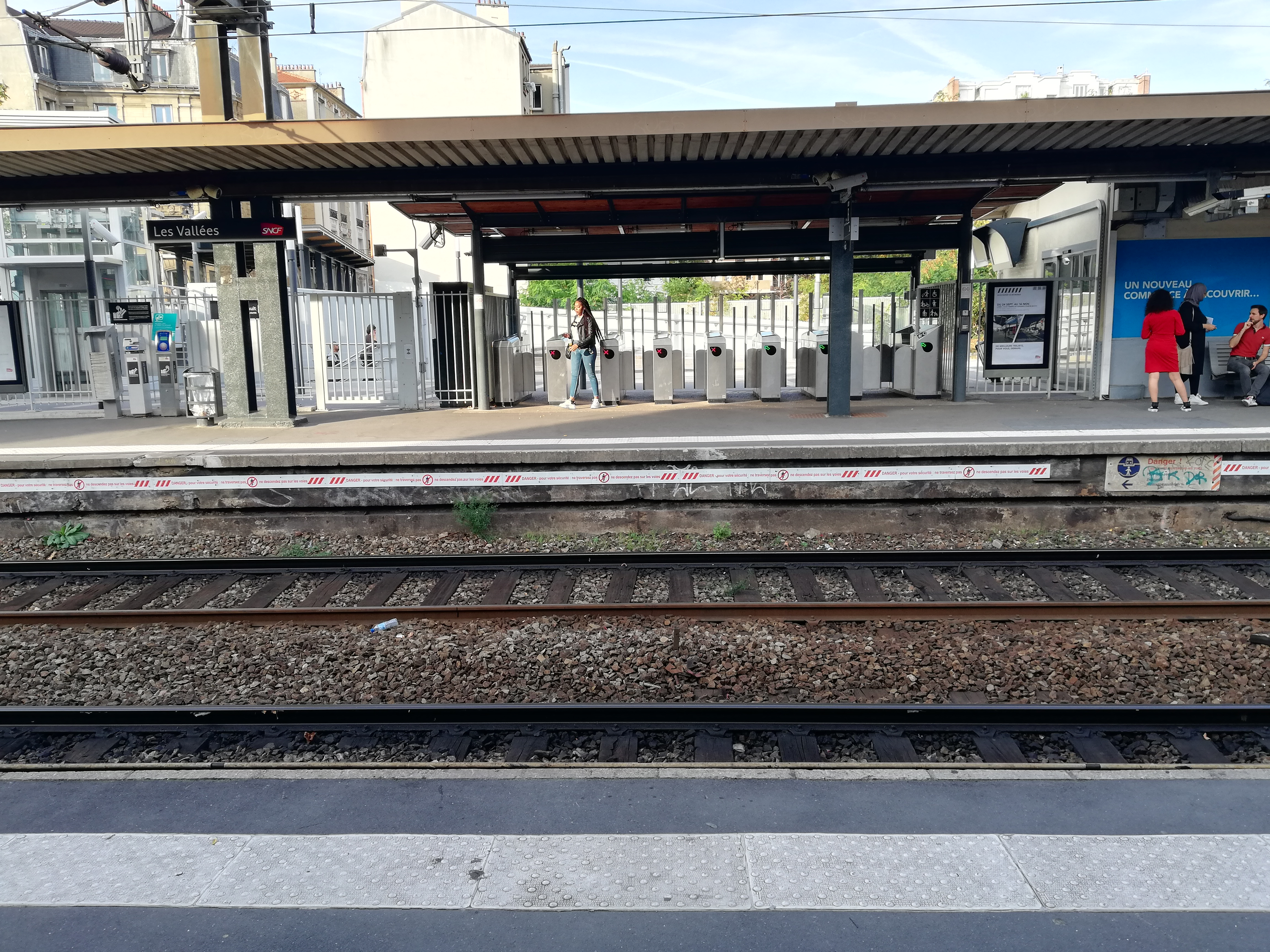

=== Intermodality ===
The station is also served by lines 164 and 566 of the RATP bus network.

== Railway heritage ==
Passenger building

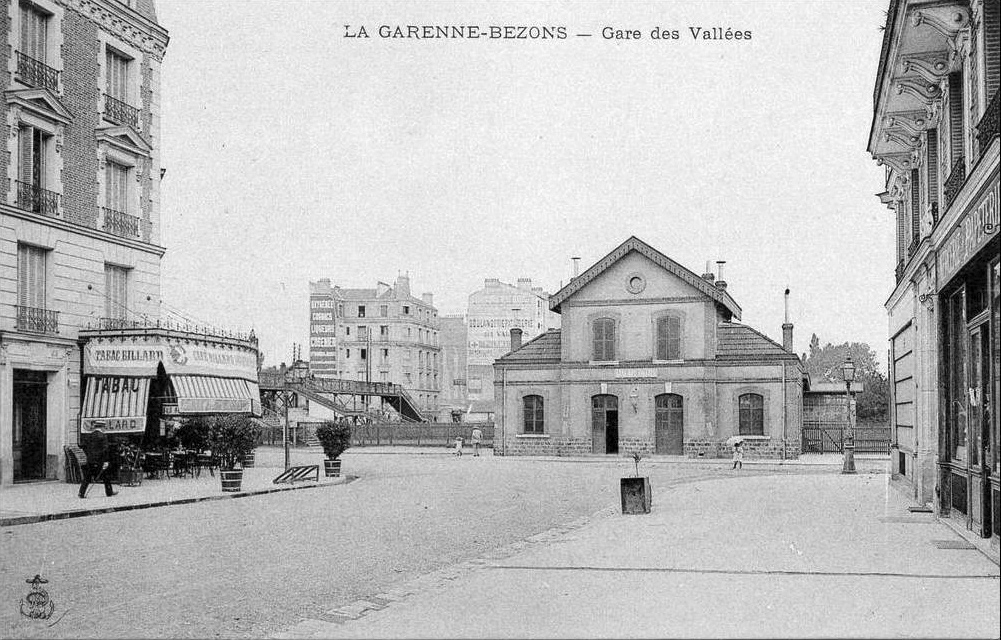
Around 1900.

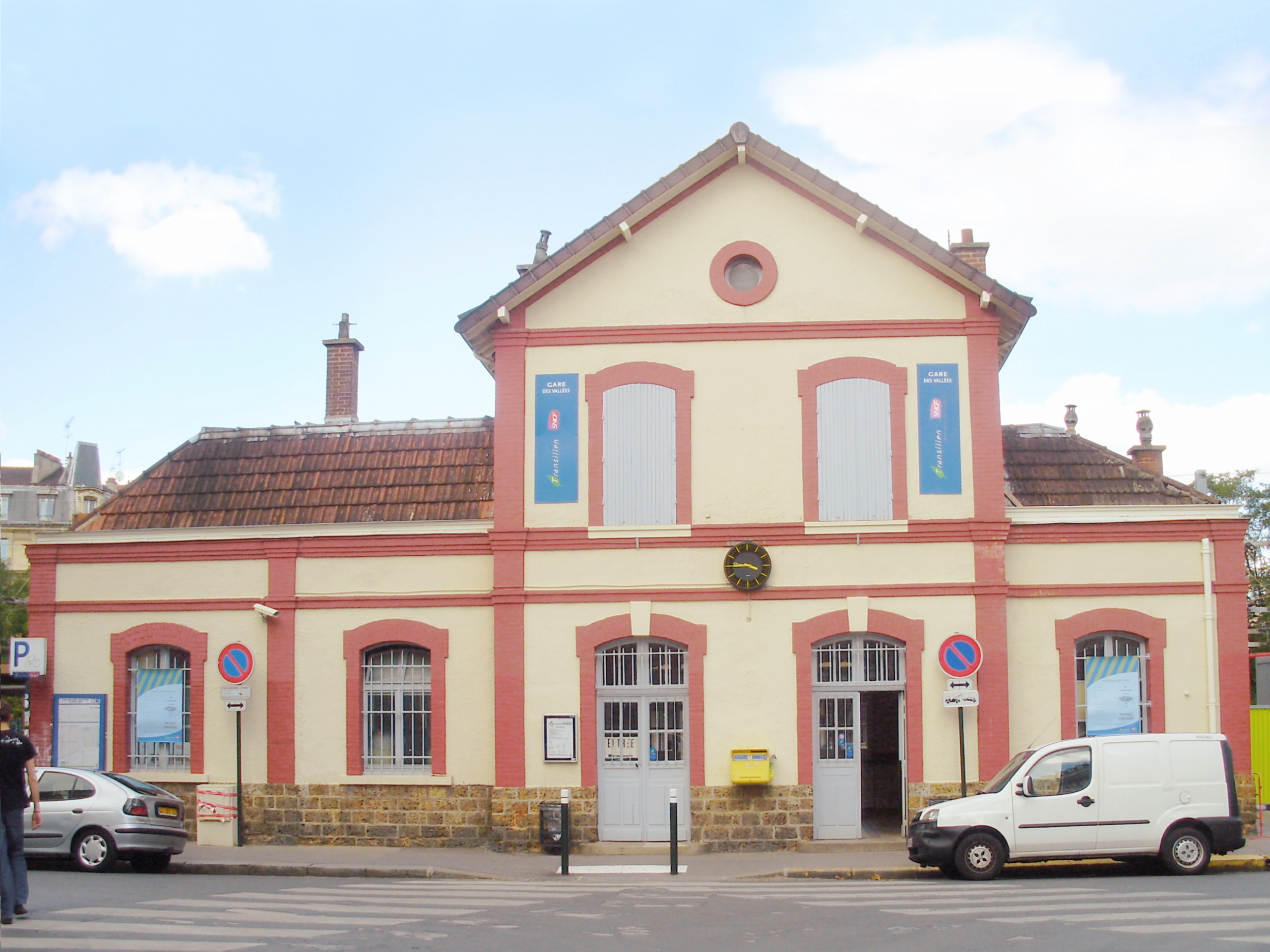
In 2010.

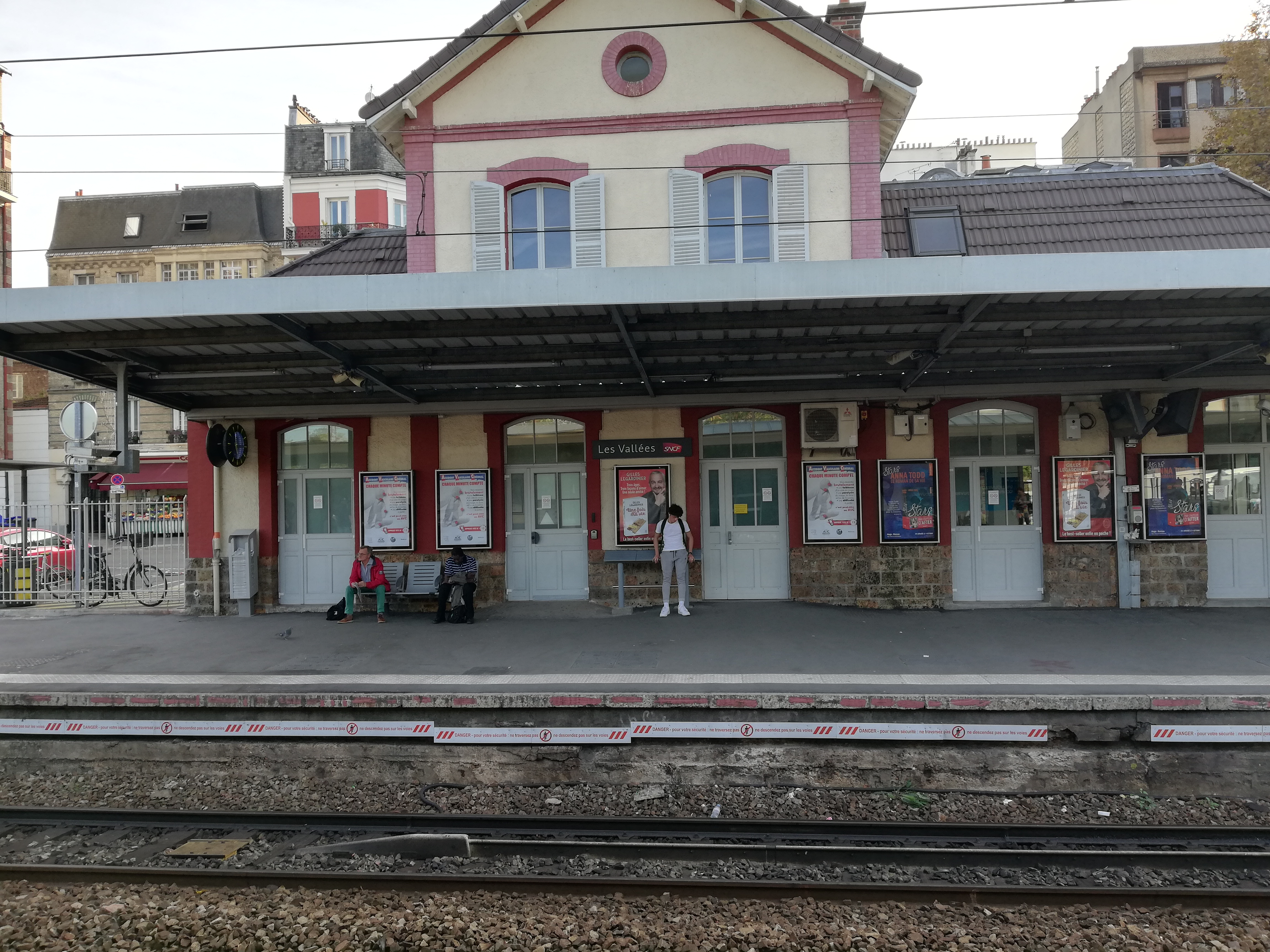
In 2018.

== See also ==
- List of SNCF stations in Île-de-France
- List of Transilien stations
