= La Garenne-Colombes =

- Commune
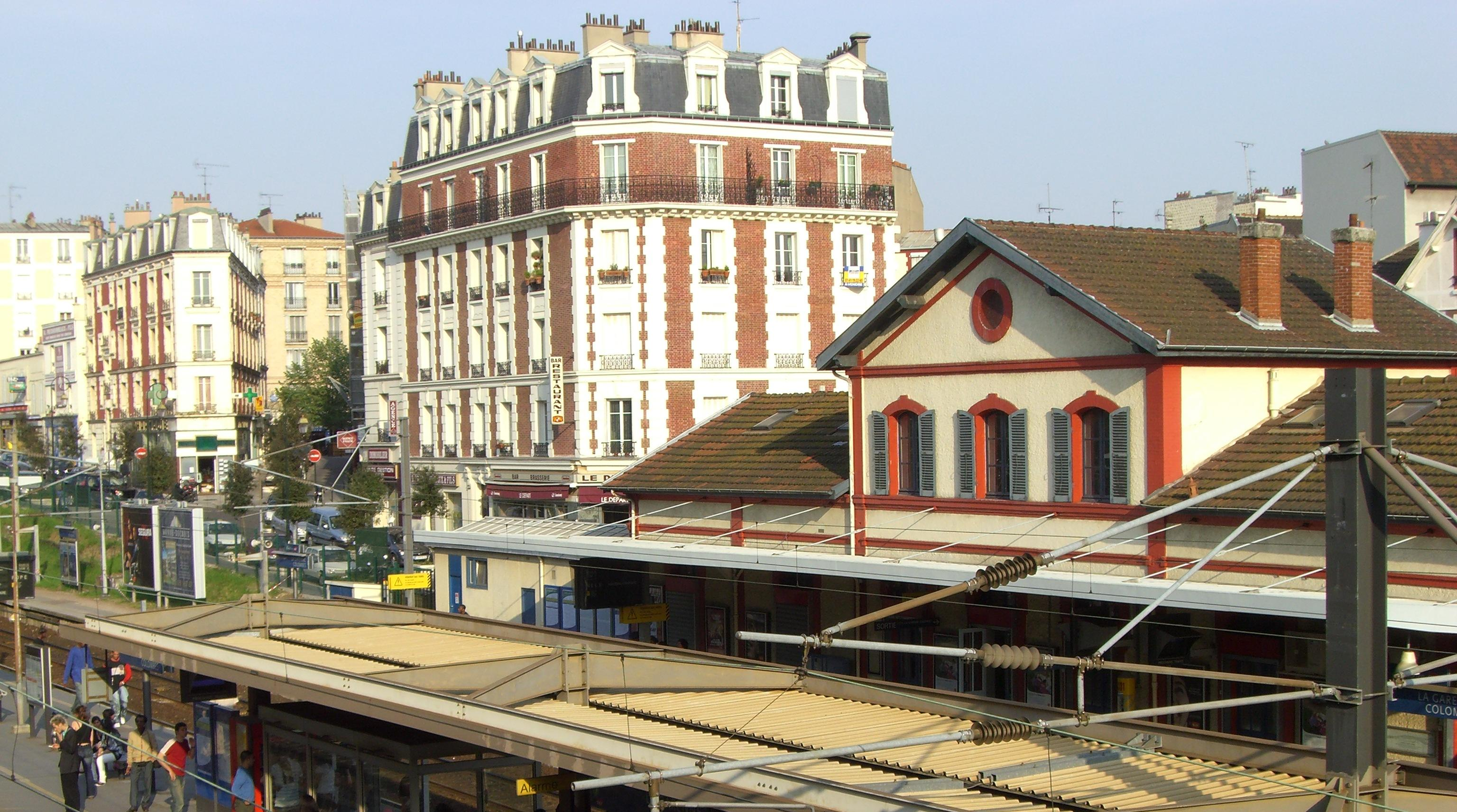
- The train station at La Garenne-Colombes

- Coat of arms

- Location (in red) within Paris inner suburbs
- Location of La Garenne-Colombes
- Location within France Location within Île-de-France (region)
- Coordinates: 48°54′20″N 2°14′40″E
- Country: France
- Region: Île-de-France
- Department: Hauts-de-Seine
- Arrondissement: Nanterre
- Canton: Colombes-2
- Intercommunality: Grand Paris

Government
  - Mayor (2026–32): Monique Raimbault
- Area^{1}: 1.78 km^{2} (0.69 sq mi)
- Elevation: 41 m (135 ft)
- Highest elevation: 46 m (151 ft)
- Lowest elevation: 37 m (121 ft)
- Population (2023): 30,197
  - Density: 17,000/km^{2} (43,900/sq mi)
- Time zone: UTC+01:00 (CET)
  - Summer (DST): UTC+02:00 (CEST)
- INSEE/Postal code: 92035 /92250
- ^{1} French Land Register data, which excludes lakes, ponds, glaciers > 1 km^{2} (0.386 sq mi or 247 acres) and river estuaries.

La Garenne-Colombes (French pronunciation: [la gaʁɛn kɔlɔ̃b]) is a commune in the northwestern suburbs of Paris, France. It is located 9.6 km (6.0 mi) from Notre Dame de Paris, France's kilometre zero.

== Name ==
The commune used to be part of the neighbouring city of Colombes. At this time, before 1910, it was called La Garenne de Colombes, literally "the warren of doves".

The explanation for the city being called "warren" is that it used to be a warren where people would hunt. But this dates back to the French monarchy, in the 18th century and before.

== Geography ==
La Garenne-Colombes is usually simply called "La Garenne", and nicknamed "petit Neuilly".

=== Surroundings ===
Four towns surround La Garenne-Colombes: Colombes (North), Bois-Colombes (East), Courbevoie (South) and Nanterre (West). The city is quite small compared with the other cities in the Hauts-de-Seine, it is more or less as small as the first arrondissement of Paris. Very close to La Garenne-Colombes are La Défense and the Île de la Jatte island (Bowl Island).

=== Transportation ===
La Garenne-Colombes is served by two stations on the Transilien Paris-Saint-Lazare suburban rail line: La Garenne-Colombes and Les Vallées (this last station is located at the border between the commune of La Garenne-Colombes and the commune of Bois-Colombes, with a postal address in La Garenne-Colombes). The train has been used there since 1837.

The two stations directly join Paris's most important urban station (Gare Saint-Lazare) in 10 minutes and the largest university in Paris (Paris Ouest La Défense University, Western Paris University La Défense) in 2 minutes.

In 1935, five Tramway lines crossed La Garenne-Colombes.

Many RATP Bus lines also cross the city: lines 73, 161, 163, 164, 176, 178, 262, 272, 278, 358 and 378.

Two RATP Noctilien night Bus lines cross the city: N24 and N152.

In 2012, the line 2 of the Parisian Tramway will cross La Garenne-Colombes, with two stations: Les Fauvelles (French for Wildcats) and Charlebourg. To join the center of the CBD, 2 to 4 minutes will be required by tramway.

== History ==
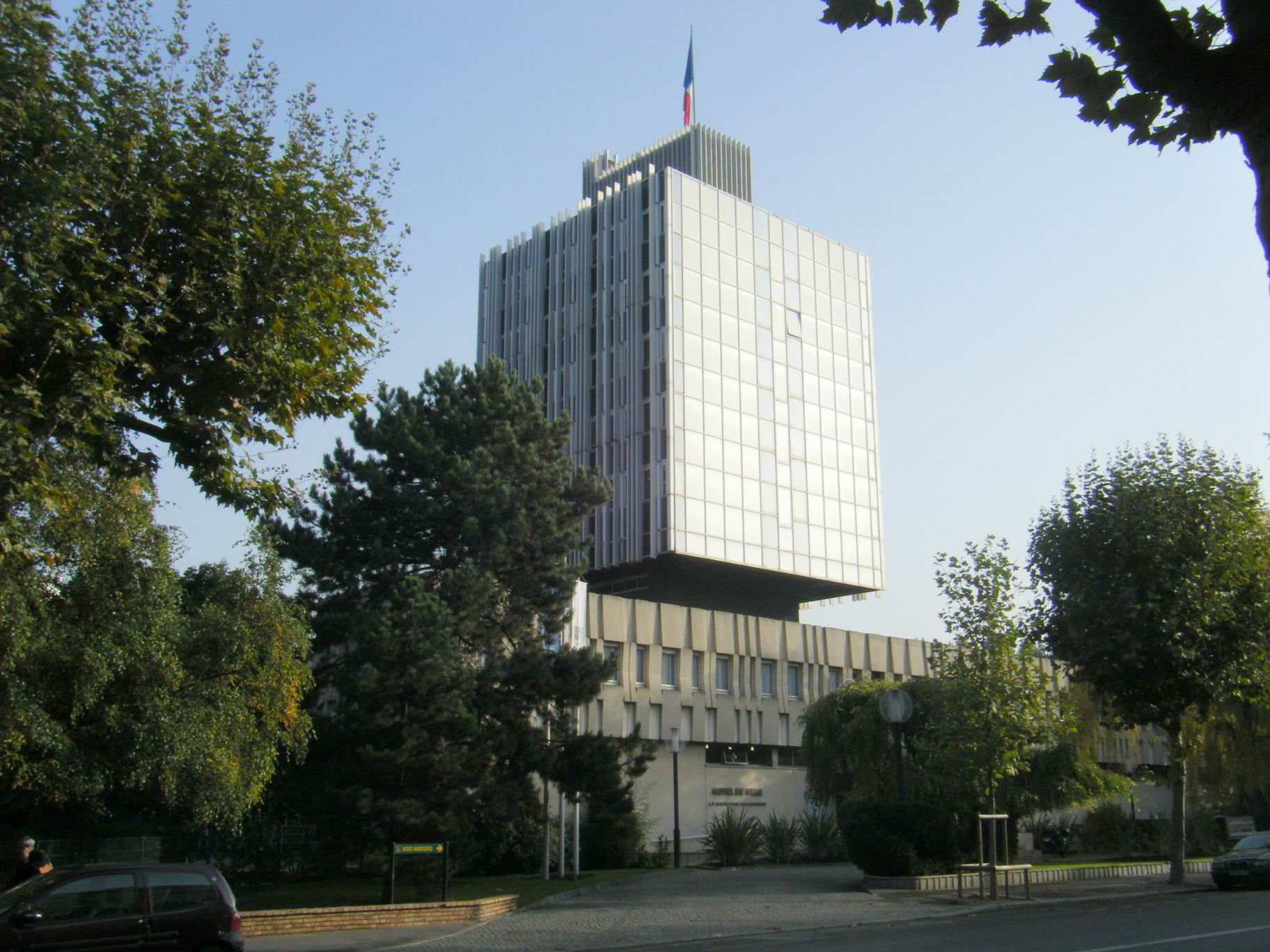
The Hôtel de Ville

The area was named "La Garenne dépendant de Colombes" ("La Garenne depending on Colombes") in 1240. After the Bourbon Restoration in 1815, the estate was bought by Peter Urban Sartoris, a Genevois banker who had lived in London for many years. On his death in 1833 it was inherited by his six children, who urbanised it and named the Rue Sartoris. They sold the last of their interests in 1865.

The commune of La Garenne-Colombes was created on 2 May 1910 by detaching its territory from the commune of Colombes. The Hôtel de Ville was completed in 1971.

== Demography ==
Historical population

Year	Pop.	±% p.a.
1911	14,534	—
1921	18,512	+2.45%
1926	20,545	+2.11%
1931	23,167	+2.43%
1936	24,734	+1.32%
1946	24,080	−0.27%
1954	26,753	+1.32%
1962	27,341	+0.27%
1968	26,562	−0.48%

Year	Pop.	±% p.a.
1975	24,038	−1.42%
1982	20,990	−1.92%
1990	21,754	+0.45%
1999	24,067	+1.13%
2007	27,001	+1.45%
2012	28,371	+0.99%
2017	29,169	+0.56%
2023	30,197	+0.58%

Source: EHESS and INSEE (1968–2023)

As the commune's territory is entirely built up, population can only grow if buildings are demolished and replaced by bigger buildings for more people (higher, less gardens). Thereby the population will grow certainly over 30,000 after many reconstructions in the "Champs-Philippe" neighbourhood, with a density over 17,000 inhabitants per square kilometre (44,000 inhabitants/mi^{2}).

According to statistics, La Garenne-Colombes is an average city of the Hauts-de-Seine department (Paris region), which is one of the richest places in Europe.

== Economy ==
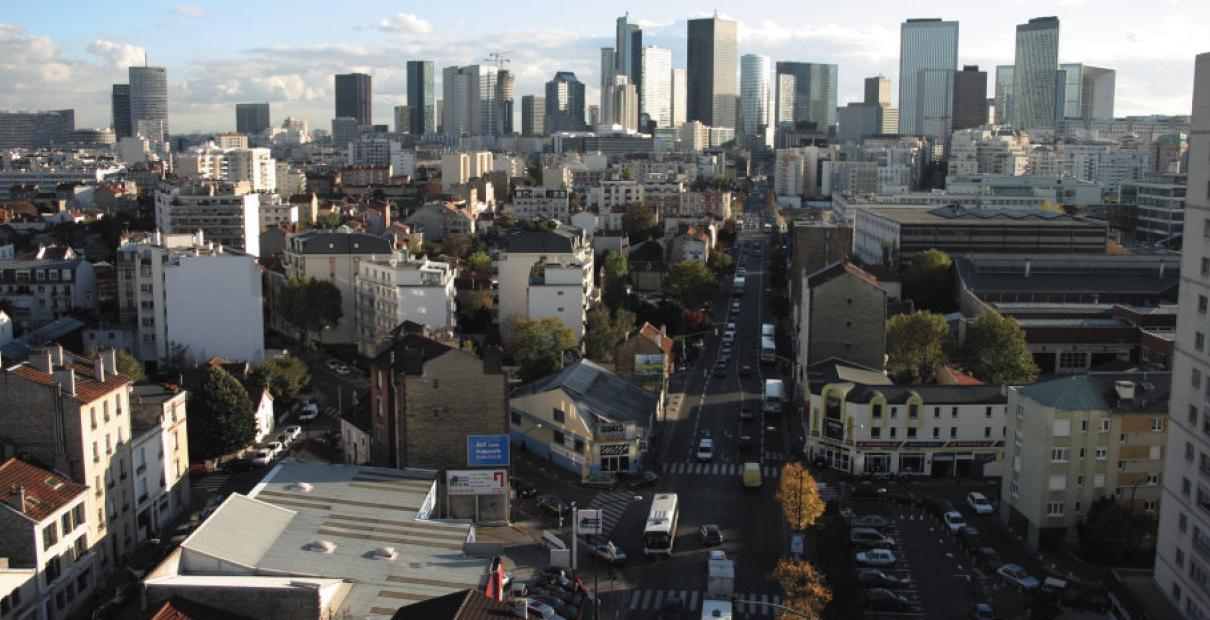
La Garenne-Colombes is very close to Paris business center La Défense

The landscape looks like an American CBD (Central Business District). But this is in the suburbs of Paris, which do not look like the downtown Paris districts surrounding the Eiffel Tower or the Champs-Élysées. Paradoxically, the most advanced part of the city of Paris, geographically speaking, is on the outskirts of the city itself.

There used to be many workshops in La Garenne-Colombes, as in a large part of the Hauts-de-Seine department. Today, it is mainly a residential city. However, some 1200 business units are there.

=== Tertiary activity ===
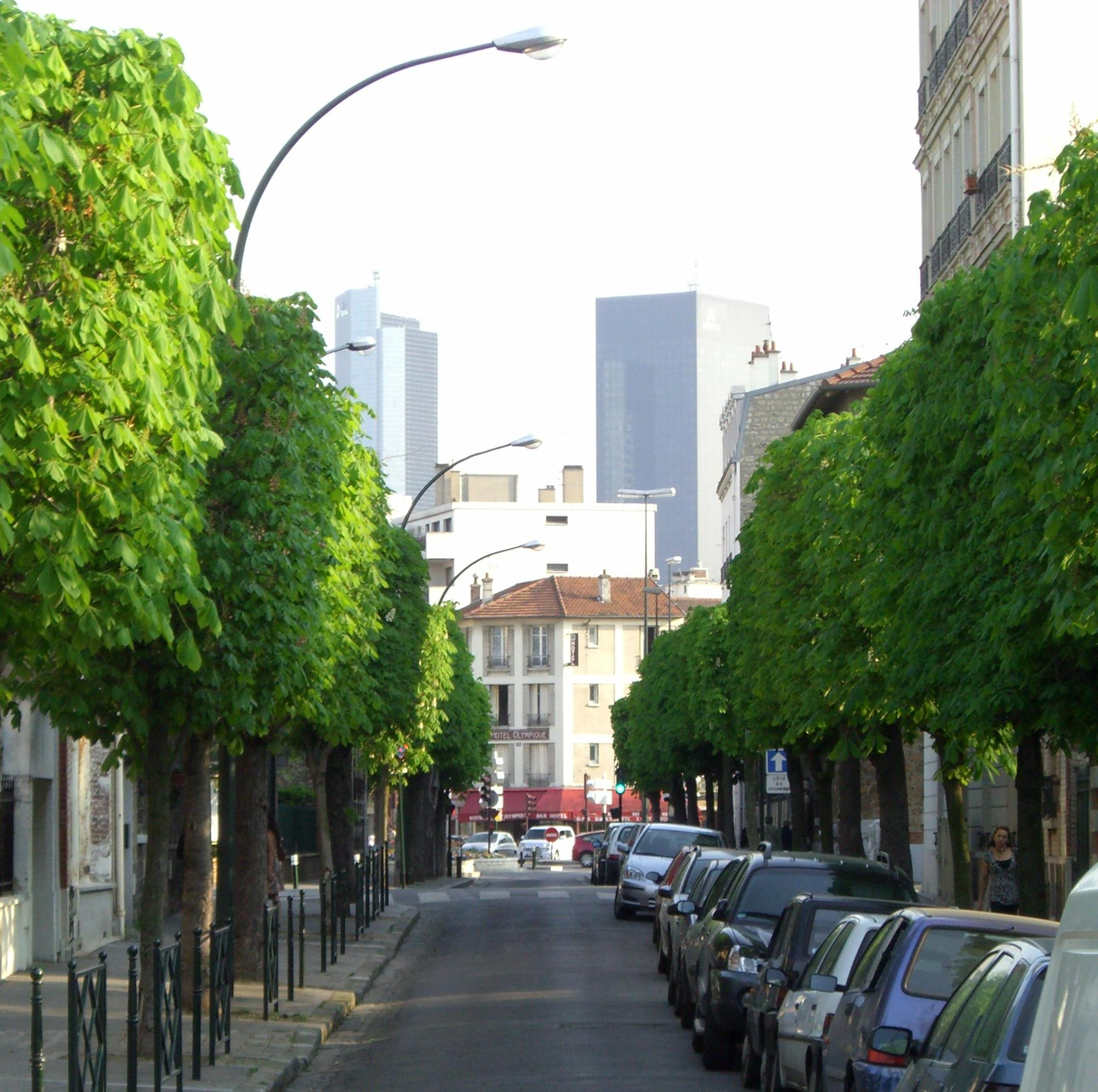
A little street near the station

The service industry is paramount in the economy of La Garenne-Colombes. The proximity of La Défense increases this phenomenon. There is:

- Peugeot study offices
- Boston Scientific International
- RATP's Charlebourg center
- Engie's headquarters

The arrival of the Tramway in 2012 resulted in a redevelopment of a part of the city, and should bring a new breath of life to the local economy.

== Urbanism ==
=== The city ===
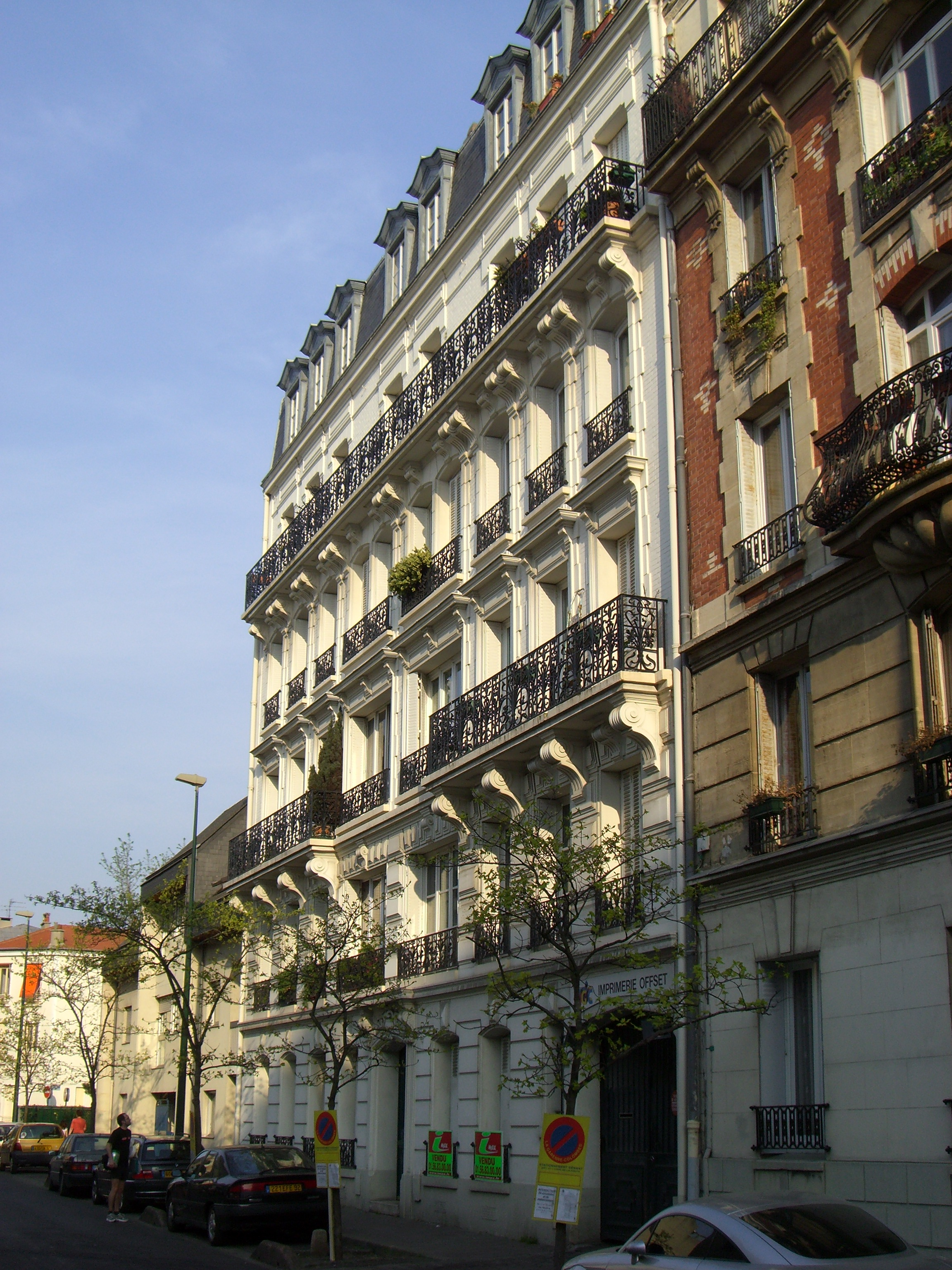
Bloc of flats, built in 1903

In spite of the proximity of La Défense and Paris which has applied a strong pressure, no big buildings were built in La Garenne. Residential buildings (detached homes and apartment buildings) account for the majority of the building stock in La Garenne-Colombes. Many of these buildings were constructed in the early 1900s. In a large part of the town, new construction is limited to 4 floors.

The neighbourhood of the place de Belgique and National boulevard, which is the entry of La Défense, is being redeveloped.

=== Green ways ===
Eight green ways are in La Garenne-Colombes, exactly:

- two public squares
- two gardens
- four parks

=== Commonly known places ===
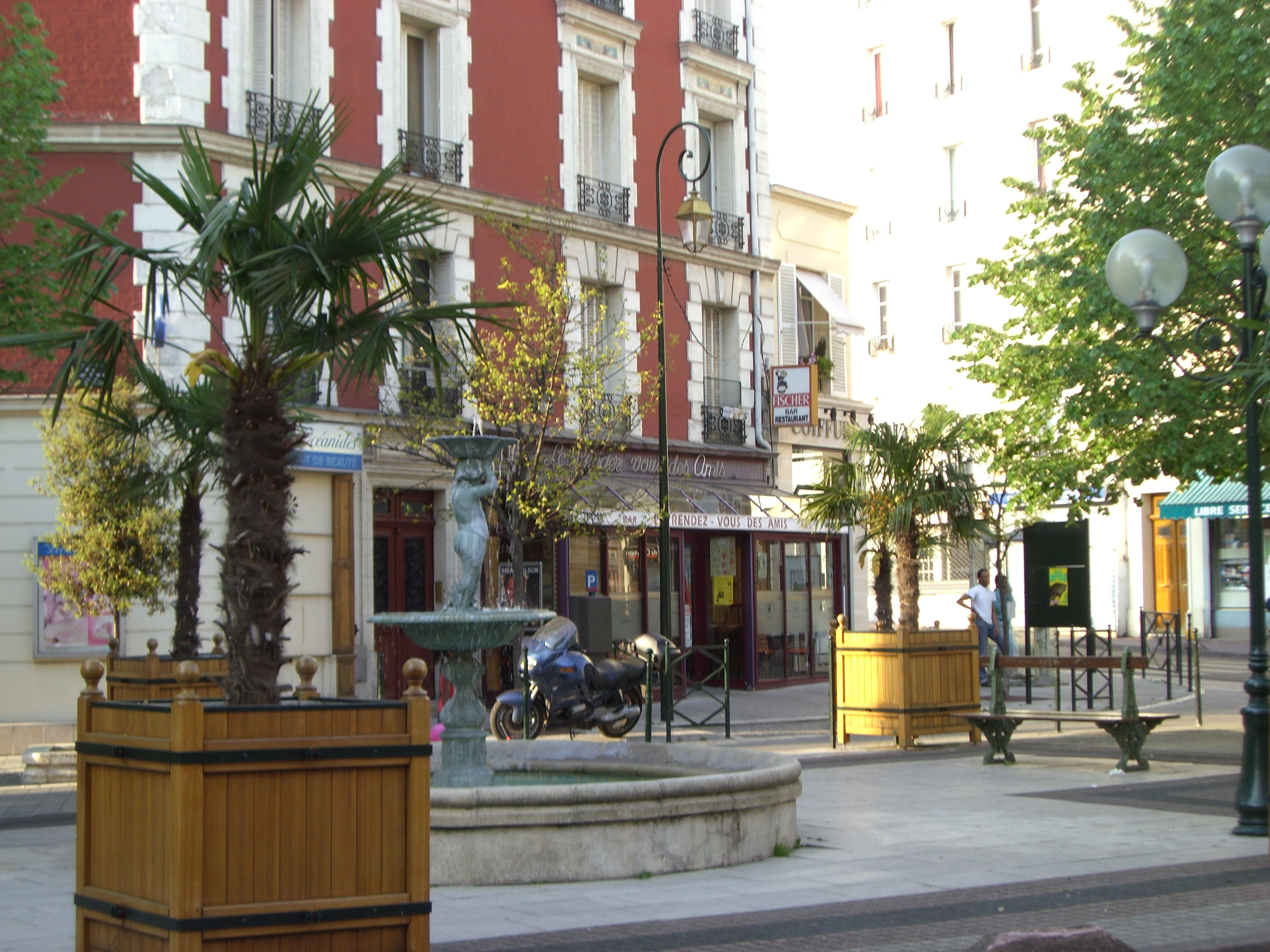
Fountain plaza

- Place de la Liberté (Freedom square), known under the name of place du marché (market) or place de l'Eglise (church)
- Place du Général Leclerc, known under the name of place de la Fontaine (Fountain plaza)
- Place de Belgique (Belgium square)
- Rond-point du Souvenir français, known under the name of place Jean Baillet
- Rond-point de l'Europe (Europe's plaza)

== Politics and administration ==
=== List of mayors ===
List of successive mayors of La Garenne-Colombes
In office		Name	Party	Ref.
June 1910	December 1933	Jean Bonal		
January 1934	November 1943	Charles Jubert		
April 1944	October 1944	Maurice Godaux		
October 1944	May 1945	André Crimet		
May 1945	October 1947	Gaston Sourrisseau		
October 1947	February 1955	Louis Jean		
March 1955	September 1971	René Guest		
September 1971	February 1975	Albert Fabbi		
February 1975	10 March 2001	Max Catrin		
11 March 2001	8 July 2022	Philippe Juvin		
9 July 2022	Incumbent	Monique Raimbault	LR	

=== Twin towns – sister cities ===
La Garenne-Colombes is twinned with:

- Wangen im Allgäu, Germany
- Yokneam Illit, Israel
- Harissa-Daraoun, Lebanon
- Valpaços, Portugal

=== Education ===
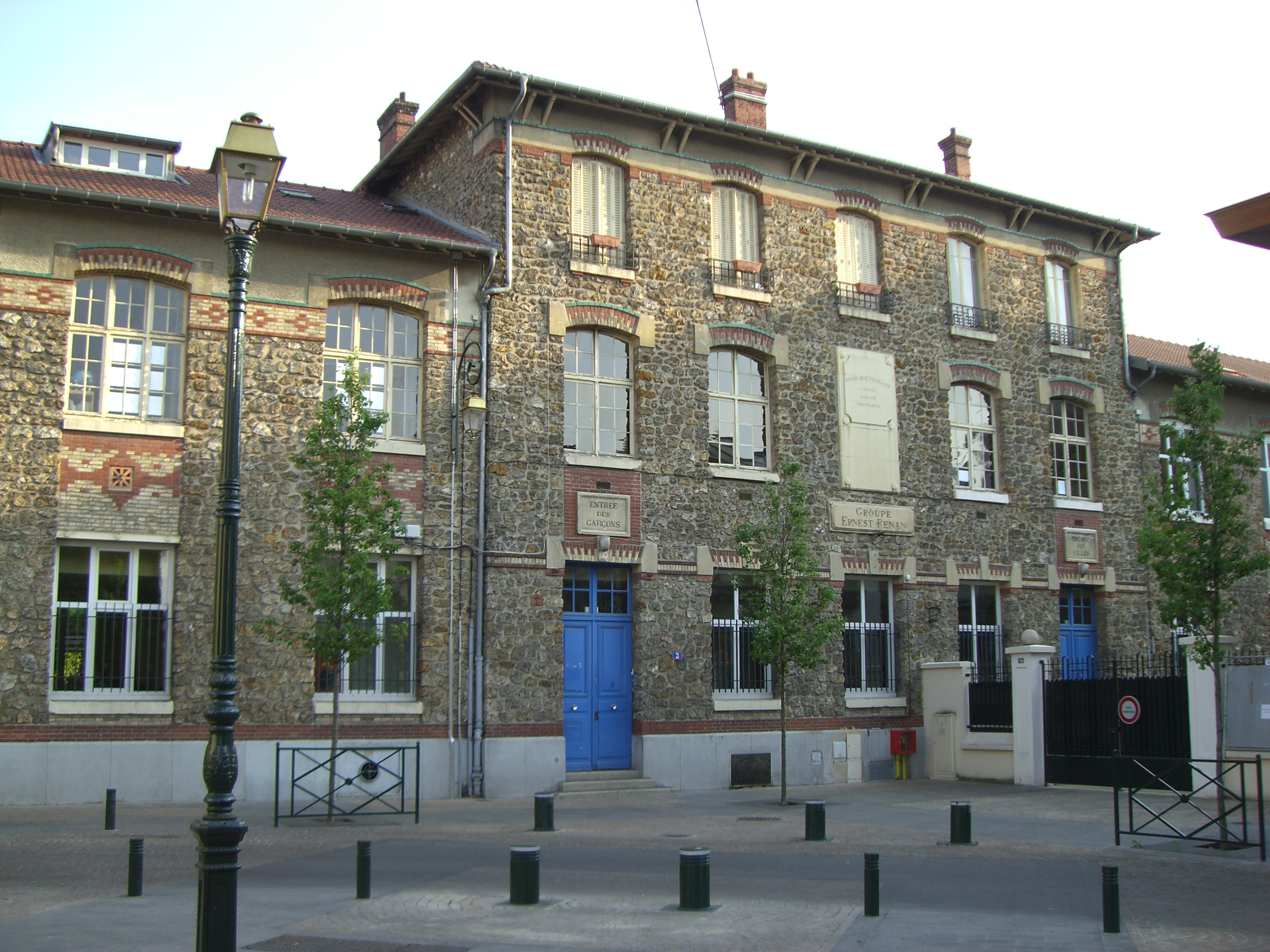
Ernest Renan primary school

The commune has four public preschools and five public elementary schools.

- Primary schools: René Guest, André Marsault, Ernest Renan (built in 1905), Sainte Geneviève, Sagot Voltaire
- Junior high school: Les Vallées
- Junior high school: Champs-Philippe (previously named after Kléber Haedens, the name was revoked by the Hauts-de-Seine general council due to Haedens having been a nazi collaborationist)
- Vocational senior high school: Lycée La Tournelle

Students wishing to attend a general high school may go to Lycée Albert-Camus in Bois-Colombes or Lycée Paul-Lapie in Courbevoie.

The city owns a castle in Normandy where students are sometimes sent for class-holidays.

== Life in La Garenne-Colombes ==
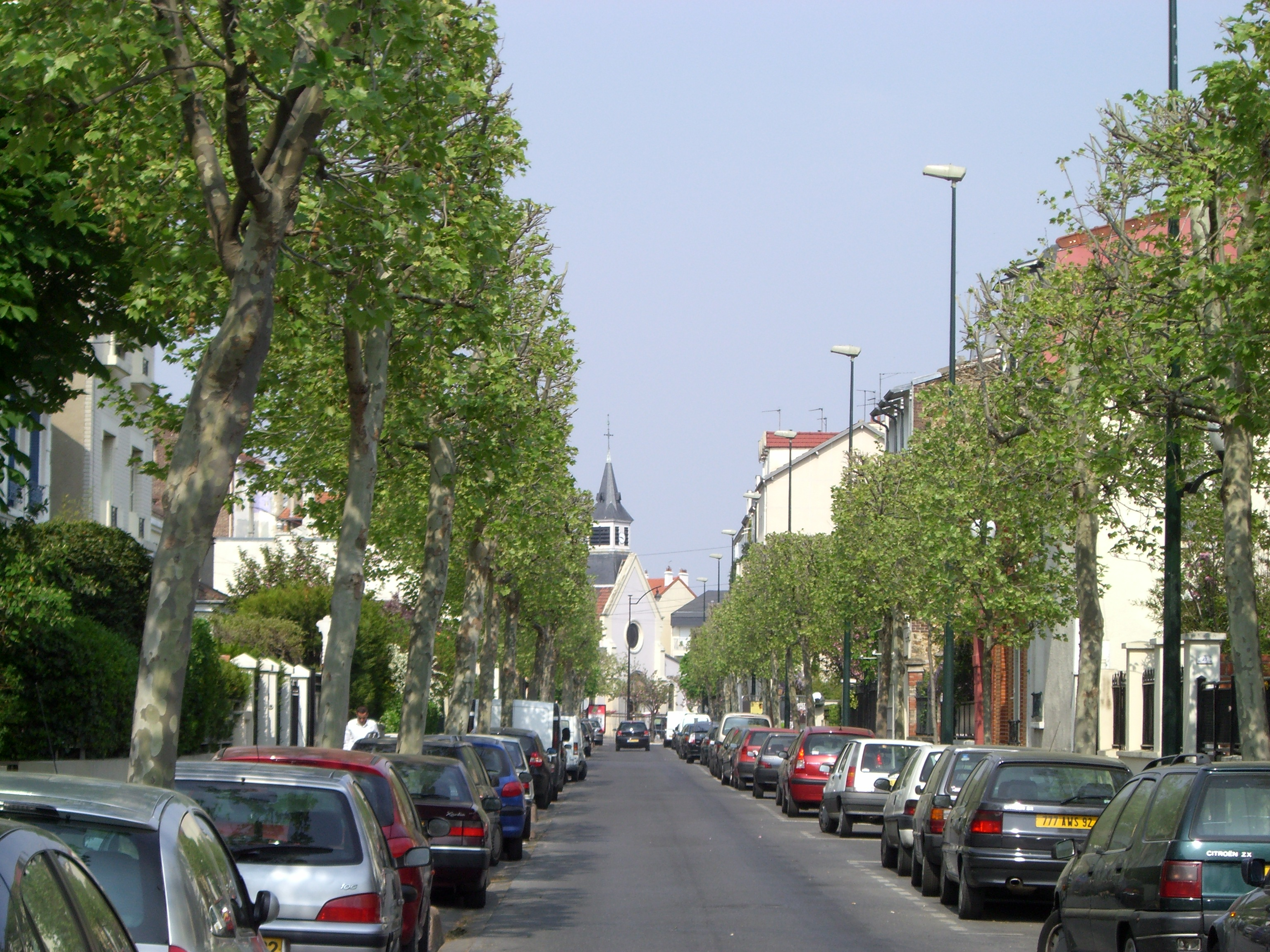
Saint-Urbain Church from a little street, downtown

According to statistics published by the Figaro newspaper, La Garenne-Colombes is the Hauts-de-Seine's city with the lowest crime rate, without forgetting that the Hauts-de-Seine is a very quiet part of the Paris region.

== Personalities ==
=== Born in La Garenne-Colombes ===
- Guy-Elphege Anouman (1994), athlete
- Patrick Chesnais (1947), French actor
- Émilie Lepennec (1987), French gymnast
- Fernand Oury (1920), French pedagogue and creator of modern French schooling
- Catherine Picard (1952), French politician
- Steven Nzonzi (1988), French soccer player

=== Lived in La Garenne-Colombes ===
- William Klein, American painter, film-maker and photographer
- Cédric Mongongu, Footballer
- Deng Xiaoping, Chinese political leader

=== Died in La Garenne-Colombes ===
- Jean Mitry (1907–1988), French film theorist, critic and filmmaker

== See also ==
- Communes of the Hauts-de-Seine department
