= La Garenne-Colombes station =

Railway station in La Garenne-Colombes, France

La Garenne-Colombes
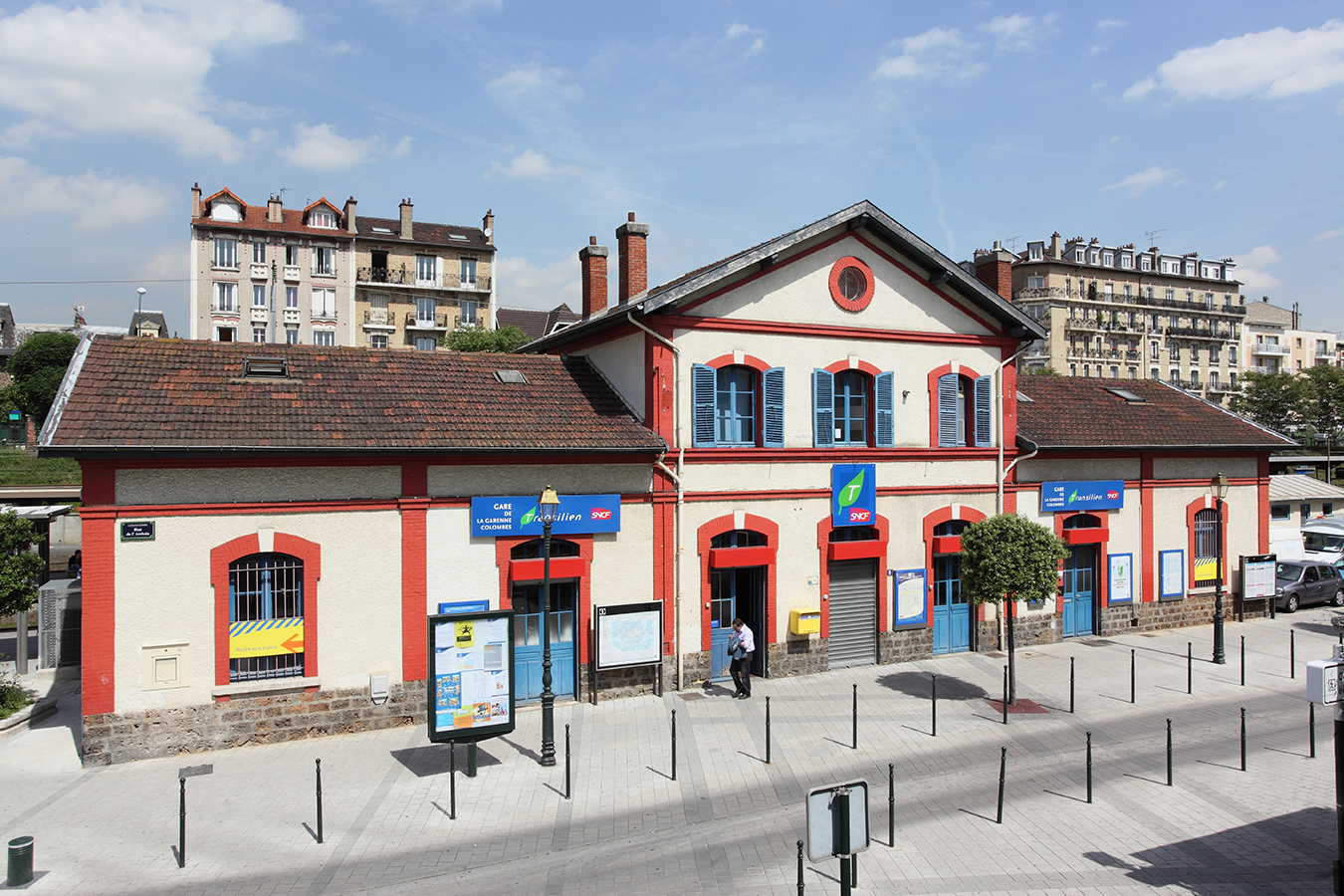
- The passenger hall of La Garenne-Colombes station in 2012.

General information
- Location: 8 Rue de l'Arrivée; La Garenne-Colombes; France
- Coordinates: 48°54′34″N 2°14′24″E
- Operator: SNCF
- Platforms: 1 side platform, 1 island platform
- Tracks: 3 + 1 bypass track
- Connections: at Charlebourg; RATP Bus: 73 163 176 262; Noctilien: N24 N152

Construction
- Structure type: At-grade
- Cycle facilities: Racks
- Accessible: Yes, by prior reservation

Other information
- Station code: 87386003
- Fare zone: 3

History
- Opened: 1 July 1887

Passengers
- 2024: 4,965,571

Services
Preceding station	Transilien	Following station
Nanterre-Université towards Cergy-le-Haut	Line L	Les Vallées towards Paris–Saint Lazare
Location

La Garenne-Colombes station is a French railway station serving the commune of La Garenne-Colombes on the Paris–Saint-Germain-en-Laye railway. It is largely located on the territory of the commune of Colombes, on the edge of the commune of La Garenne-Colombes, from where the main entrance to the station is located on Rue de l'Arrivée.

This station is served by trains from the Line L of the Transilien commuter rail network. It has a remote connection with Île-de-France tramway Line 2 at Charlebourg station.
