= Courbevoie =

- Commune
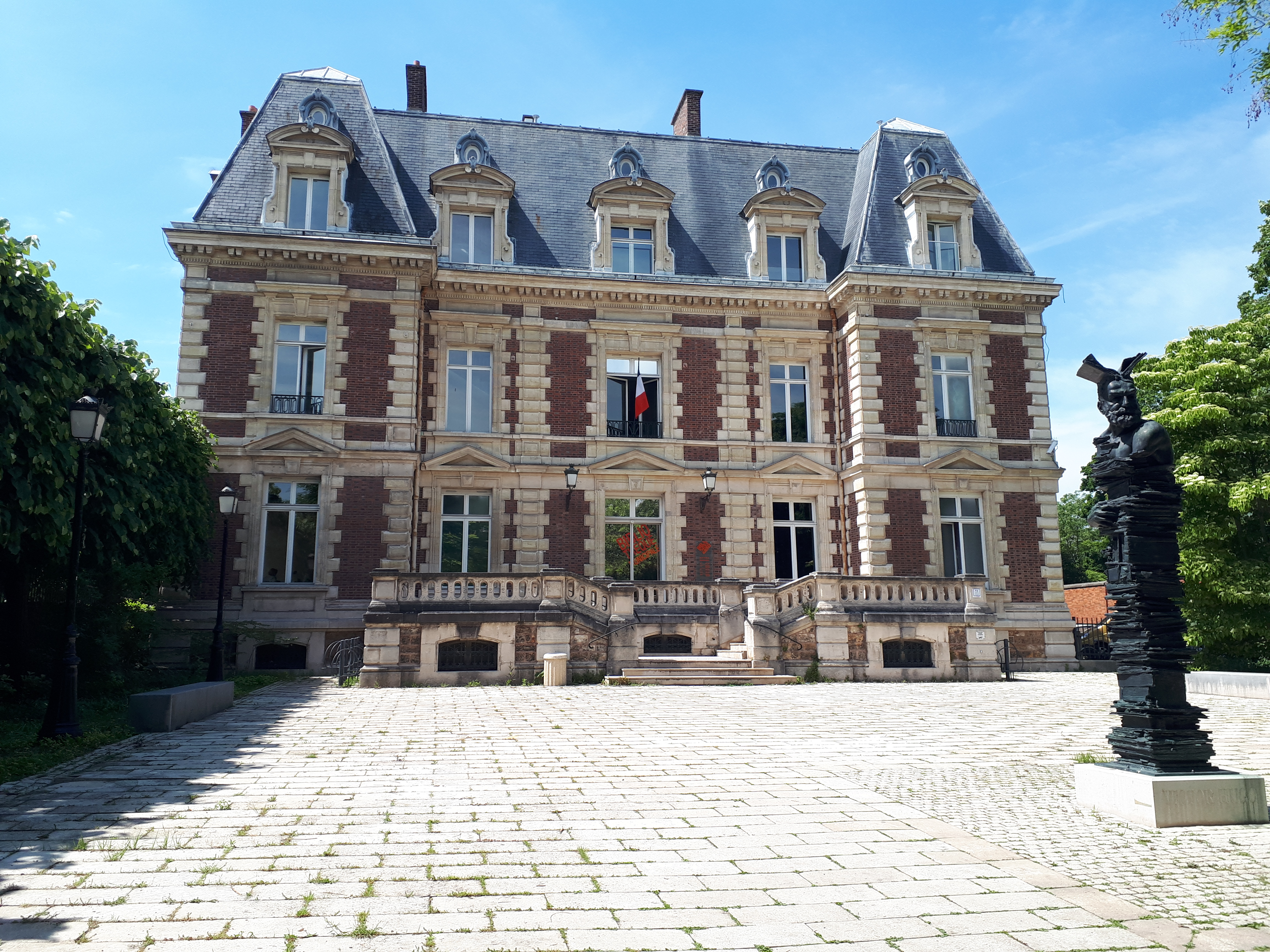
- Courbevoie Municipal Library

- Coat of arms

- Location (in red) within Paris inner suburbs
- Location of Courbevoie
- Location within France Location within Île-de-France (region)
- Coordinates: 48°53′52″N 2°15′11″E
- Country: France
- Region: Île-de-France
- Department: Hauts-de-Seine
- Arrondissement: Nanterre
- Canton: Courbevoie-1 and 2
- Intercommunality: Grand Paris

Government
  - Mayor (2026–32): Jacques Kossowski
- Area^{1}: 4.17 km^{2} (1.61 sq mi)
- Highest elevation: 56 m (184 ft)
- Lowest elevation: 25 m (82 ft)
- Population (2023): 82,902
  - Density: 19,900/km^{2} (51,500/sq mi)
- Time zone: UTC+01:00 (CET)
  - Summer (DST): UTC+02:00 (CEST)
- INSEE/Postal code: 92026 /92400
- ^{1} French Land Register data, which excludes lakes, ponds, glaciers > 1 km^{2} (0.386 sq mi or 247 acres) and river estuaries.

Courbevoie (French pronunciation: [kuʁbəvwa]) is a commune located in the Hauts-de-Seine department of the Île-de-France region of France. It is a suburb of Paris, 8.2 km (5.1 mi) from the center of Paris. The centre of Courbevoie is situated 2 km (1.2 mi) from the city limits of Paris.

La Défense, a business district hosting the tallest buildings in the Paris metropolitan area, spreads over the southern part of Courbevoie (as well as parts of Puteaux, Nanterre and La Garenne-Colombes).

== Name ==
The name Courbevoie derives from the Latin Curva Via, meaning "curved road", it refers to a Roman road from Paris to Normandy that made a sharp turn to climb the hill over which Courbevoie was built.

== Administration ==
Courbevoie is divided into two cantons: Canton of Courbevoie-1 and Canton of Courbevoie-2.

== History ==
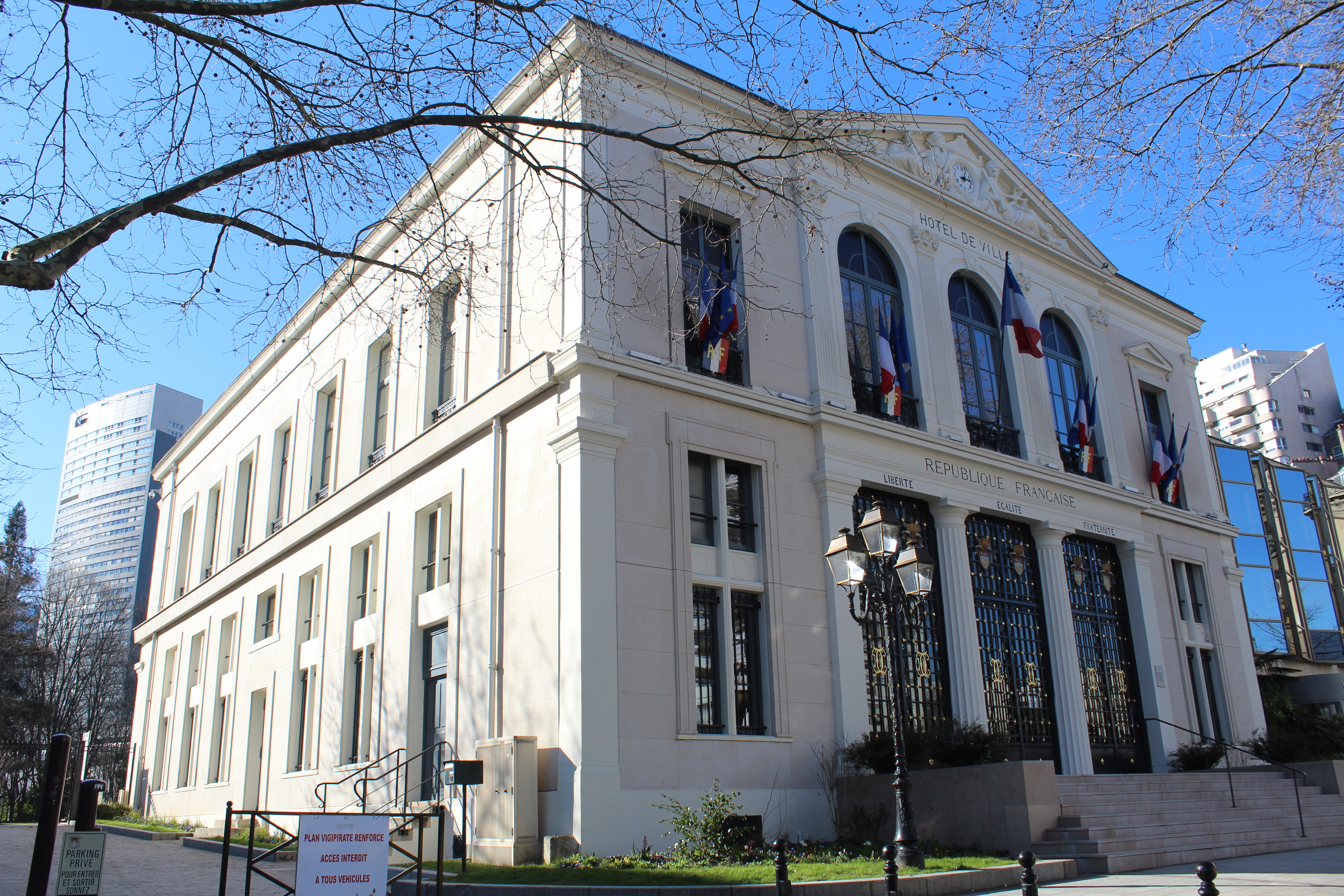
The Hôtel de Ville

In 1606, after King Henry IV's royal coach fell into the Seine while crossing the river by ferry, he ordered the construction of a wooden bridge at Courbevoie. Rebuilt in stone during the eighteenth century, this was replaced by a metal bridge in 1942.

The Convent of the Penitents founded in 1658 by Jean-Baptiste Forne was located in Courbevoie until the Revolution of 1789.

In 1840, the body of Napoleon was transported from Saint Helena, where he had been exiled and died, to Cherbourg. It was then transferred to the steamer la Normandie and transported to Val-de-la-Haye, where it was transferred to the small ferry la Dorade and transported to Courbevoie. It was then carried by road through the streets of Paris.

During the repression of January and February 1894, the police conducted raids targeting the anarchists living there, without much success.

The Hôtel de Ville was completed in 1858.

== Transport ==
Courbevoie is served by two stations on the Transilien Paris-Saint-Lazare network: Courbevoie and Bécon-les-Bruyères. Courbevoie is also served by Esplanade de La Défense station on Paris Métro Line 1, in the business district of La Défense.

Several bus routes also serve the commune and the nearby La Défense transport hub.

When it comes to air transportation, Courbevoie can be served by Paris's Charles de Gaulle Airport as well as Paris-Orly to the south and Beauvais Airport to the north.

== Education ==
Courbevoie has multiple preschools and elementary schools. Junior high schools include:

- Collège Alfred de Vigny
- Collège Georges Pompidou
- Collège Georges Seurat
- Collège Les Bruyères
- Collège Les Renardières
- Collège Sainte Geneviève

Senior high schools include:

- École européenne Paris La Défense
- Lycée Paul Lapie de Courbevoie
- Lycée Paul Painlevé Courbevoie
- Collège Les renardières et Lycée Lucie Aubrac
- Groupe scolaire Montalembert
- University of Pôle Léonard de Vinci

== Notable people ==
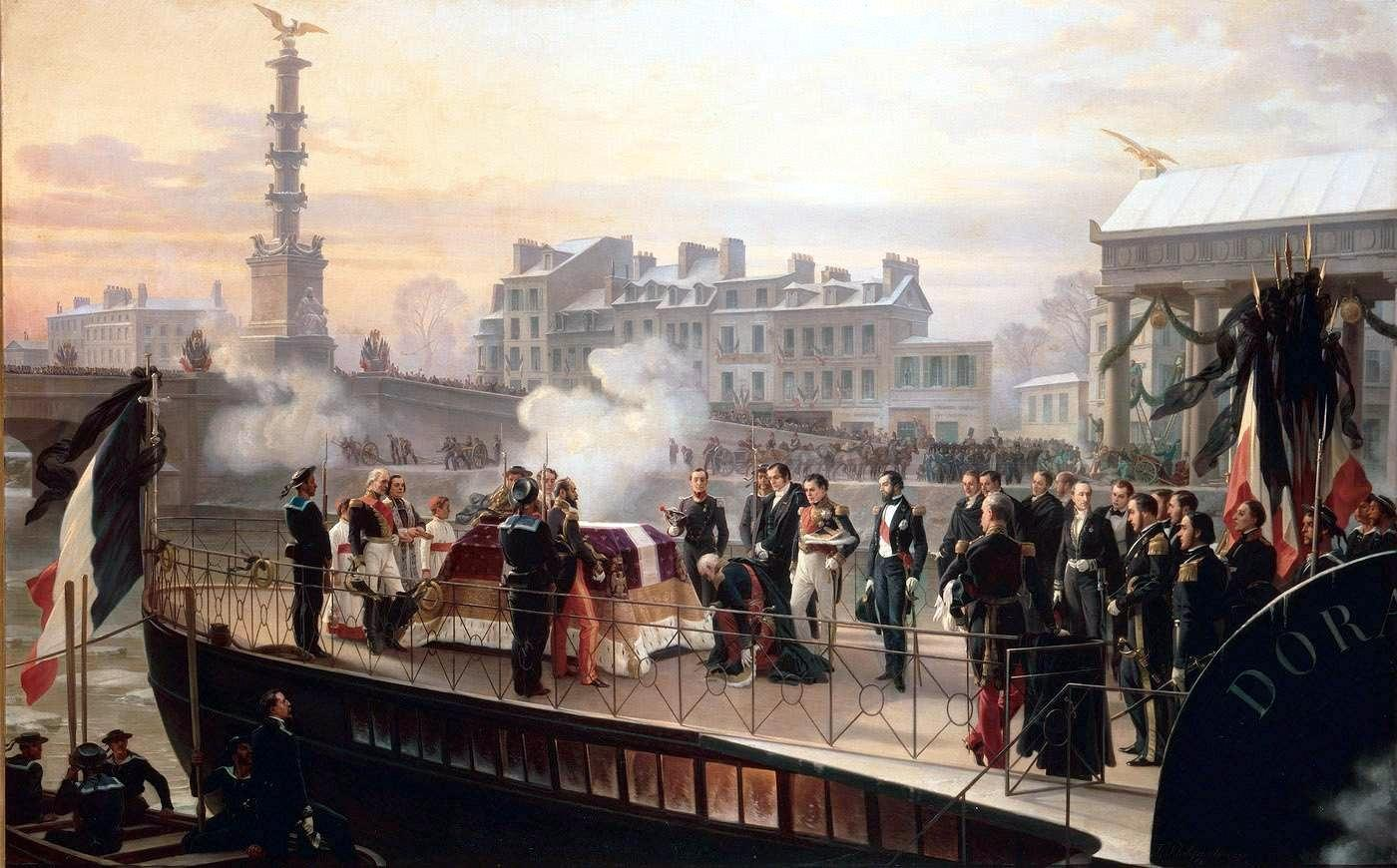
The Arrival of La Dorade at Courbevoie by Henri Félix Emmanuel Philippoteaux, 1867. Depicting the 1840 return of Napoleon, the painting is now at the Château de Malmaison.

- Georges Lamothe (1842–1894), composer, pianist and organist
- Henri Letocart (1866–1945), organist and composer
- Hélène Krzyżanowska (1867–1937), pianist and composer
- Albert Gleizes (1881–1953), cubist artist, painter, theorist
- Louis-Ferdinand Céline (1894–1961), writer
- Jacques Henri Lartigue (1894–1986), photographer and painter
- Arletty (1898–1992), actress and singer
- Roy Benson (1914–1977), stage magician
- Louis de Funès (1914–1983), actor and comedian
- Henri Betti (1917–2005), composer
- Madeleine Kamman (1930–2018), cook, culinary teacher, and author
- Jean-Pierre Worms (1934–2019), representative to the French Parliament
- Michel Delpech (1946–2016), singer-songwriter
- Michel Blanc (b. 1952), actor
- Franck Tchiloemba (b. 1973), basketball player
- Colomba Fofana (b. 1977), athlete
- Lamine Kanté (b. 1987), basketball player
- Massiré Kanté (b. 1989), footballer
- Raoul Loé (b. 1989), footballer
- Axel Augis (b. 1990), gymnast
- William Rémy (b. 1991), footballer
- Yoann Wachter (b. 1992), footballer
- Marie-Bernadette Mbuyamba (b. 1993), basketball player
- Bilal Coulibaly (b. 2004), basketball player

== International relations ==
Courbevoie is twinned with:

- Enfield (London), United Kingdom
- Freudenstadt (Baden-Württemberg), Germany
- Beit Mery (Mount Lebanon), Lebanon

== Mayors of Courbevoie ==
- Antoine Le Frique (1800–1818)
- Joseph Derbanne (October, 1818 – February, 1826)
- Nicolas Rousselot (February 1826 – April 1830)
- Jean-Baptiste Chevalier (April 1830 – August 1830)
- Constant Grebaut (August 1830 – September 1840)
- Désiré Maurenq (September 1840 – 1845)
- Constant Grebaut (1845 – 26 August 1865)
- Charles Blondel (26 August 1865 – 7 February 1872)
- Jean-François Durenne (7 February 1872 – November 1873)
- Jean-Baptiste Weiss (November 1873 – 20 February 1874)
- Auguste Colas (20 February 1874 – 12 February 1878)
- Frédéric Bourgin (12 February 1878 – October 1878)
- Auguste Bailly (October 1878 – 19 May 1888)
- Antoine Rolland (19 May 1888 – 15 May 1892)
- Jules Lefevre (15 May 1892 – 27 January 1894)
- François le Chippey (27 January 1894 – May 1896)
- Léon Boursier (May 1896 – May 1908)
- Charles Mering (May 1908 – December 1919)
- Augustin Loiseau (December 1919 – October 1920)
- Joseph Victor (October 1920 – May 1925)
- Pierre Fouquart (May 1925 – September 1927)
- André Grisoni (September 1927 – July 1944)
- Gabriel Roche (September 1944 – 26 October 1947)
- Marius Guerre (26 October 1947 – 20 December 1954)
- Gabriel Roche (26 January 1955 – 15 March 1959)
- Charles Deprez (26 March 1959 – 18 June 1995)
- Jacques Kossowski (since 25 June 1995)

== Demographics ==
=== Population ===
Historical population

Year	Pop.	±% p.a.
1793	1,400	—
1800	1,316	−0.88%
1806	1,500	+2.21%
1821	1,372	−0.59%
1831	1,923	+3.43%
1836	2,488	+5.29%
1841	2,763	+2.12%
1846	3,768	+6.40%
1851	4,302	+2.69%
1856	5,548	+5.22%
1861	10,553	+13.72%
1866	9,862	−1.35%
1872	13,288	+5.10%
1876	11,934	−2.65%
1881	15,112	+4.84%
1886	15,937	+1.07%
1891	17,597	+2.00%
1896	20,105	+2.70%
1901	25,330	+4.73%

Year	Pop.	±% p.a.
1906	31,191	+4.25%
1911	38,138	+4.10%
1921	46,053	+1.90%
1926	48,888	+1.20%
1931	54,185	+2.08%
1936	58,638	+1.59%
1946	55,080	−0.62%
1954	59,730	+1.02%
1962	59,491	−0.05%
1968	58,118	−0.39%
1975	54,488	−0.92%
1982	59,830	+1.35%
1990	65,389	+1.12%
1999	69,694	+0.71%
2007	84,974	+2.51%
2012	86,854	+0.44%
2017	81,719	−1.21%
2023	82,902	+0.24%

Source: EHESS and INSEE (1968–2023)

=== Immigration ===
Place of birth of residents of Courbevoie in 1999
Born in metropolitan France	Born outside metropolitan France			
80.0%	20.0%			
80.0%	Born in overseas France	Born in foreign countries with French citizenship at birth^{1}	EU-15 immigrants^{2}	Non-EU-15 immigrants
80.0%	1.1%	3.8%	3.4%	11.7%
^{1} This group is made up largely of former French settlers, such as pieds-noirs in Northwest Africa, followed by former colonial citizens who had French citizenship at birth (such as was often the case for the native elite in French colonies), as well as to a lesser extent foreign-born children of French expatriates. A foreign country is understood as a country not part of France in 1999, so a person born for example in 1950 in Algeria, when Algeria was an integral part of France, is nonetheless listed as a person born in a foreign country in French statistics.^{2} An immigrant is a person born in a foreign country not having French citizenship at birth. An immigrant may have acquired French citizenship since moving to France, but is still considered an immigrant in French statistics. On the other hand, persons born in France with foreign citizenship (the children of immigrants) are not listed as immigrants.

== Economy ==
Total S.A. has its head office in the Tour Total in La Défense and in Courbevoie. Areva has its head office in the Tour Areva in Courbevoie. Saint-Gobain also has its head office in Courbevoie.

The headquarters of INPI, the French government office for patents, copyrights, and trademarks, is in Courbevoie.

== Gallery ==
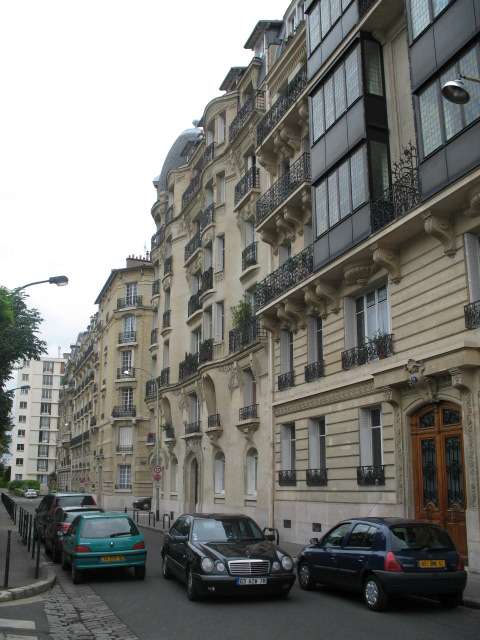
Street at the border between Courbevoie and Asnières

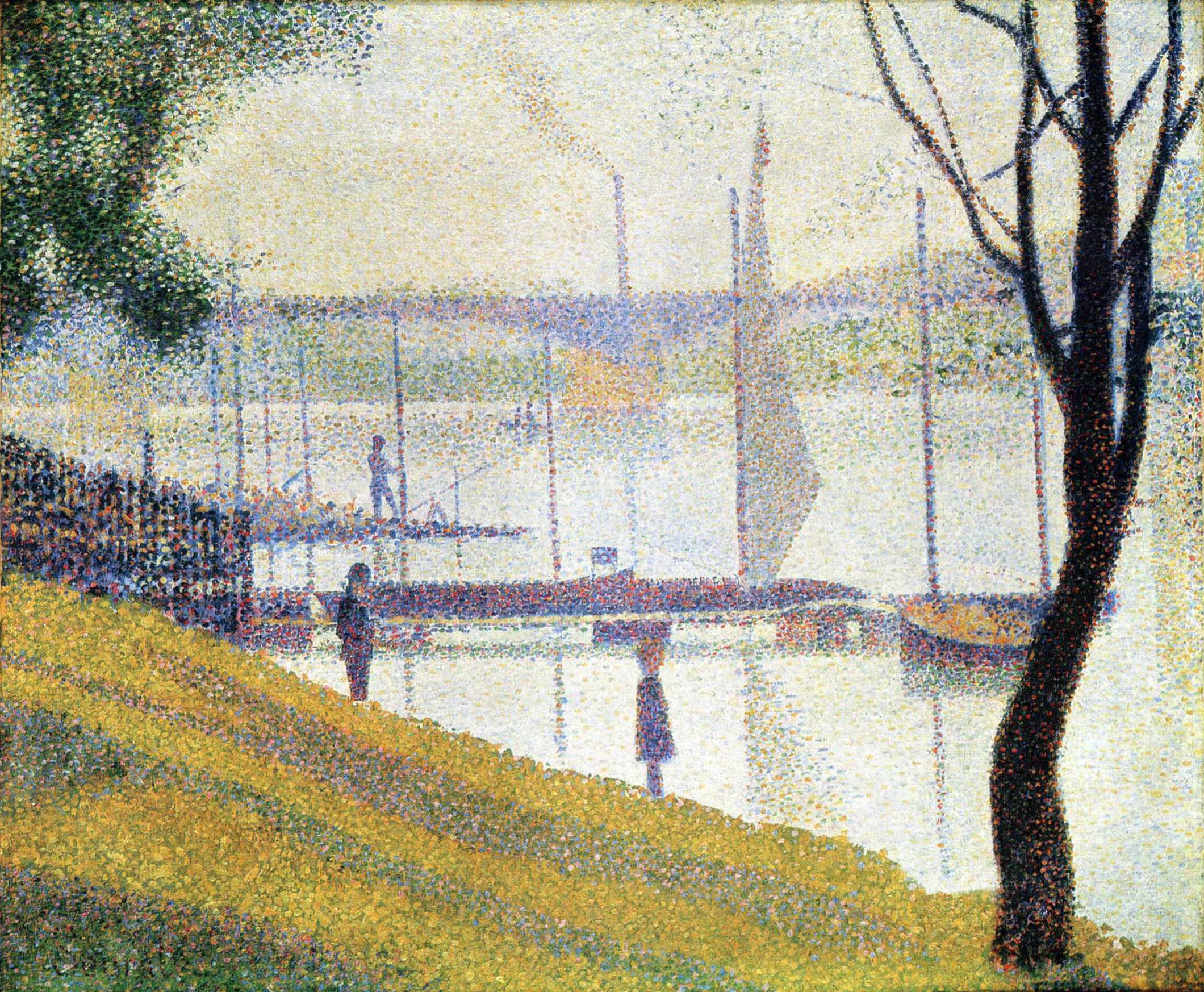
Bridge of Courbevoie, Georges Seurat, 1886–1887

== See also ==
- La Défense business district.
- List of tallest structures in Paris
- Phare Tower, a 300-meter skyscraper now under construction
- Communes of the Hauts-de-Seine department
