= Canton of Courbevoie-1 =

Administrative division of Hauts-de-Seine, France

Coordinates: 48.90°N 2.26°E

The canton of Courbevoie-1 is an administrative division of the Hauts-de-Seine department, in northern France. It was created at the French canton reorganisation which came into effect in March 2015. Its seat is in Courbevoie.

It consists of the following communes:

1. Asnières-sur-Seine (partly)
2. Courbevoie (partly)
