= Hôtel de Ville, La Garenne-Colombes =

Town hall in La Garenne-Colombes, France

Hôtel de Ville
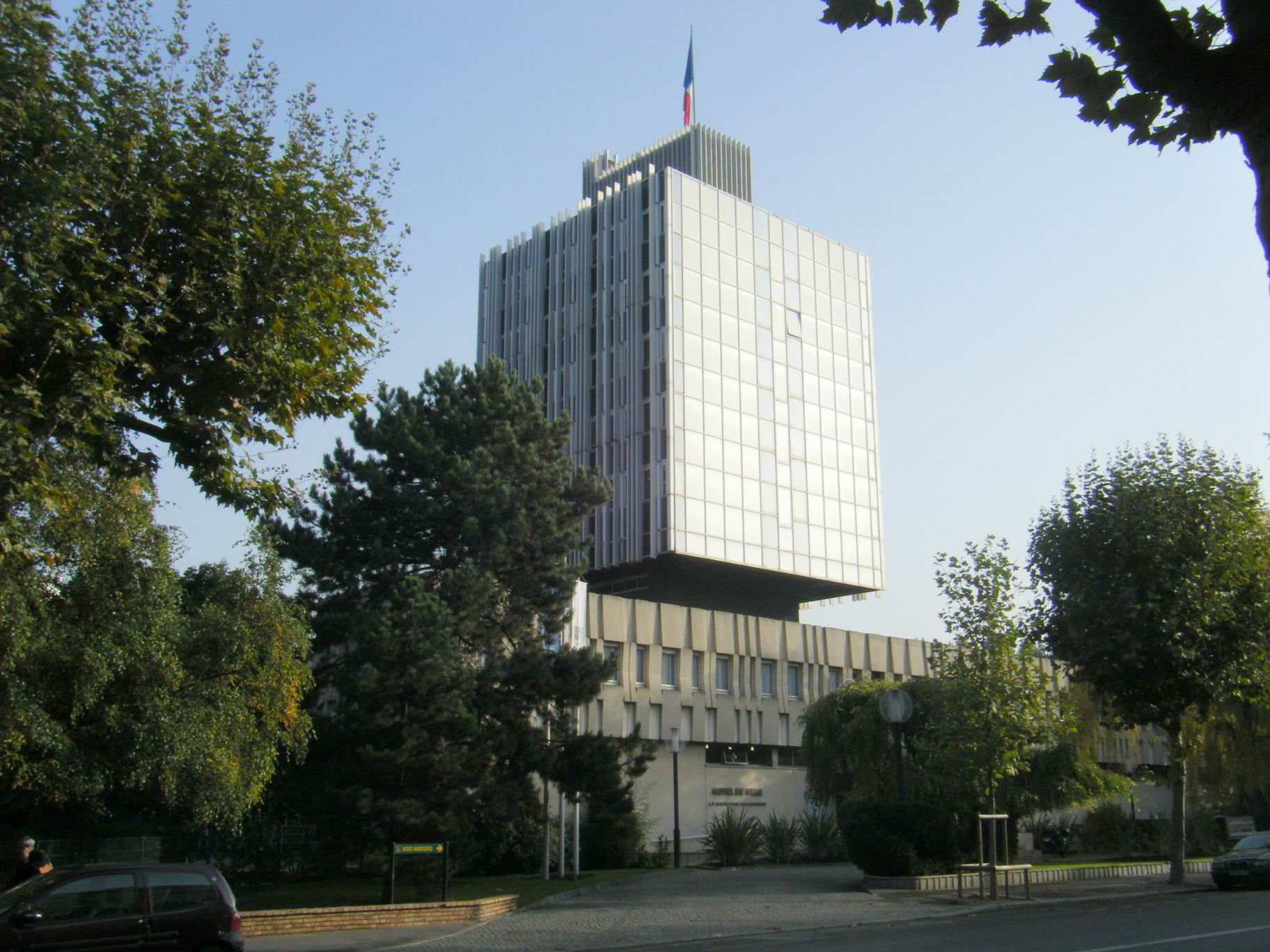
- The main frontage of the Hôtel de Ville in October 2008
- Interactive map of the Hôtel de Ville area

General information
- Type: City hall
- Architectural style: Modern style
- Location: La Garenne-Colombes, France
- Coordinates: 48.9069°N 2.2465°E
- Completed: 1971

Design and construction
- Architects: Jacques Morel and Michel Homberg

The Hôtel de Ville (French pronunciation: [otɛl də vil], City Hall) is a municipal building in La Garenne-Colombes, Hauts-de-Seine, in the northwestern suburbs of Paris, standing on Boulevard de la République.

== History ==
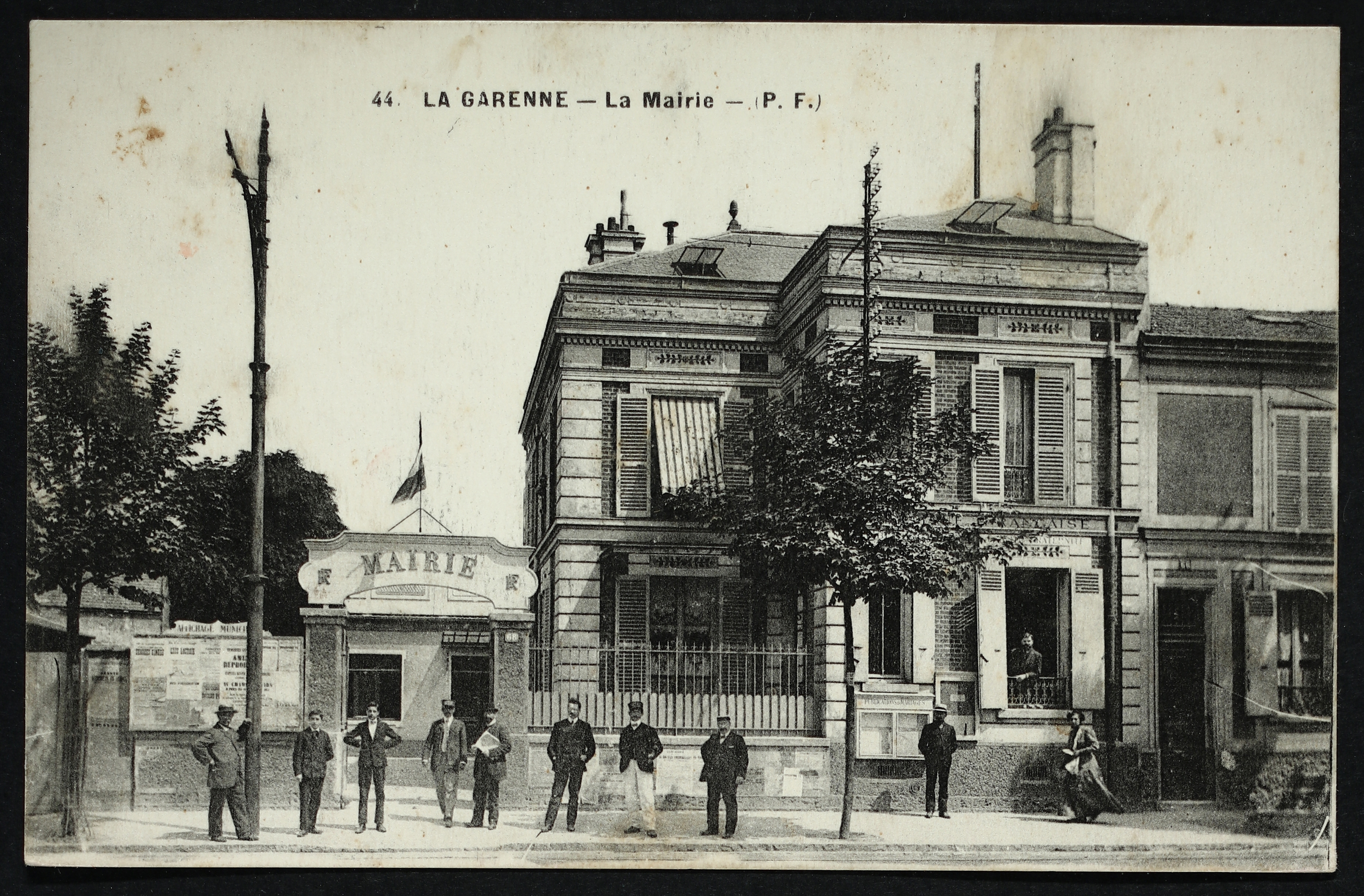
The old town hall on Boulevard de la République

Following the creation of the new commune of La Garenne-Colombes by detaching territory from the commune of Colombes in 1910, the new town council led by the mayor, Jean Bonal, established a small municipal office in a building in the centre of the town.

After finding this arrangement unsatisfactory, the council decided to establish a more substantial town hall. The site they selected was on the north side of Boulevard de la République. The building was designed in the neoclassical style and built in ashlar stone. The design involved an asymmetrical main frontage of three bays facing onto Boulevard de la République, with the right-hand section of two bays projected forward. It was fenestrated by casement windows with shutters on both floors. Access was through a gateway on the west side: the gateway was formed by a pair of square pillars supporting a segmental panel inscribed with the word "Mairie".

In the aftermath of the Second World War, the council decided to acquire another building to accommodate its municipal services. The building it selected was a mansion on the northwest side of Rue de l'Aigle. The mansion was commissioned by a wealthy merchant, Gustave Aubry. It was designed in the Beaux-Arts style, built in ashlar stone and was completed in 1899. It was then owned by a Russian couple, Szlama Monoson and Lidje Khinsky, who only used it on their infrequent visits to France. It was acquired by the council in 1949 and was subsequently used to accommodate its highway, planning and environmental services departments. After it was no longer required for municipal use, it became a public library and then an annex to the local media library.

In the mid-1960s, following substantial population growth, the council led by the mayor, René Guest, decided to commission a modern town hall on the site of the old town hall on Boulevard de la République. The new building was designed by Jacques Morel and Michel Homberg in the modern style, built in concrete and glass and was completed in 1971.

The design involved a five-storey square tower sitting on a long two-storey podium. The tower was clad in glass with full-height slats on the east and west sides. The podium featured a glass entrance with a canopy on the ground floor, and a long expanse of plain concrete interspersed by a series of casement windows on the first floor. Internally, the principal room was the Grande salle du Théâtre.
