= Bécon-les-Bruyères station =

Railway station in France

Bécon-les-Bruyères
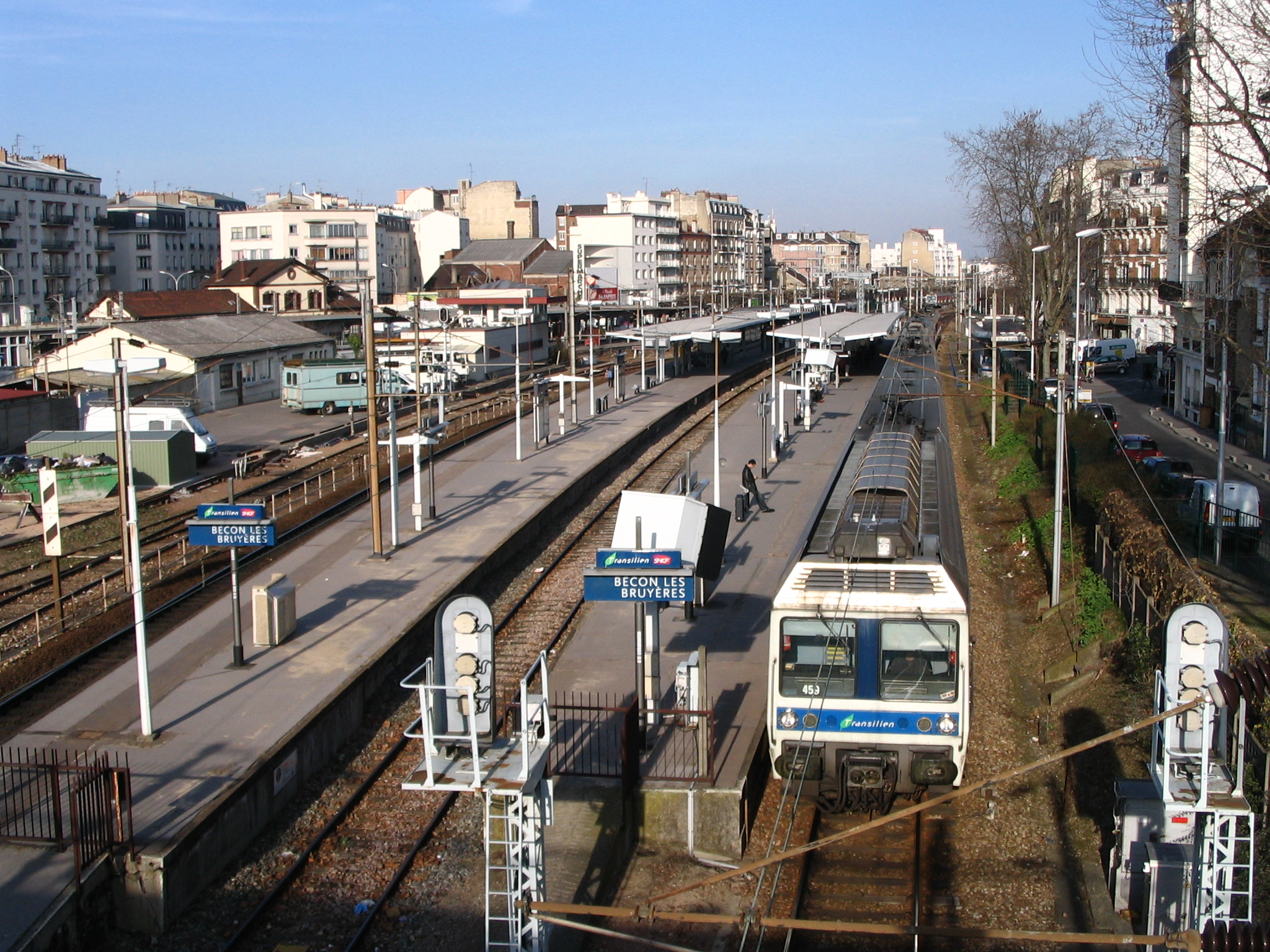
- Bécon-les-Bruyères station platforms

General information
- Location: Place de la Gare; Courbevoie; France
- Coordinates: 48°54′20″N 2°16′08″E
- Operator: SNCF
- Platforms: 4 island platforms
- Tracks: 6

Construction
- Structure type: At-grade
- Accessible: Yes, by prior reservation

Other information
- Station code: 87382002
- Fare zone: 5

Passengers
- 2024: 11,677,230

Services
| Preceding station | Transilien | Following station |
|---|---|---|
| Courbevoie towards Saint-Nom-la-Bretèche or Versailles–Rive Droite | Line L | Asnières-sur-Seine towards Paris–Saint Lazare |
| Les Vallées towards Cergy-le-Haut | Line L | Asnières-sur-Seine towards Paris–Saint Lazare |
Location

Bécon-les-Bruyères station (French pronunciation: [bekɔ̃ le bʁɥijɛʁ]) is a railway station in the town Courbevoie, Hauts-de-Seine department, in the northwestern suburbs of Paris, France. It is on the railway lines from Gare Saint-Lazare to Versailles and to Saint-Germain-en-Laye, and is served by Transilien Line L.
