= Franck Tchiloemba =

French basketball player (born 1973)

Franck Tchiloemba (born January 4, 1973, in Courbevoie) is a French basketball player who played for French Pro A league clubs Hyeres-Toulon, Strasbourg, No and Paris during 2002-2004 seasons.
