= Hôtel de Ville, Courbevoie =

Town hall in Courbevoie, France

Hôtel de Ville
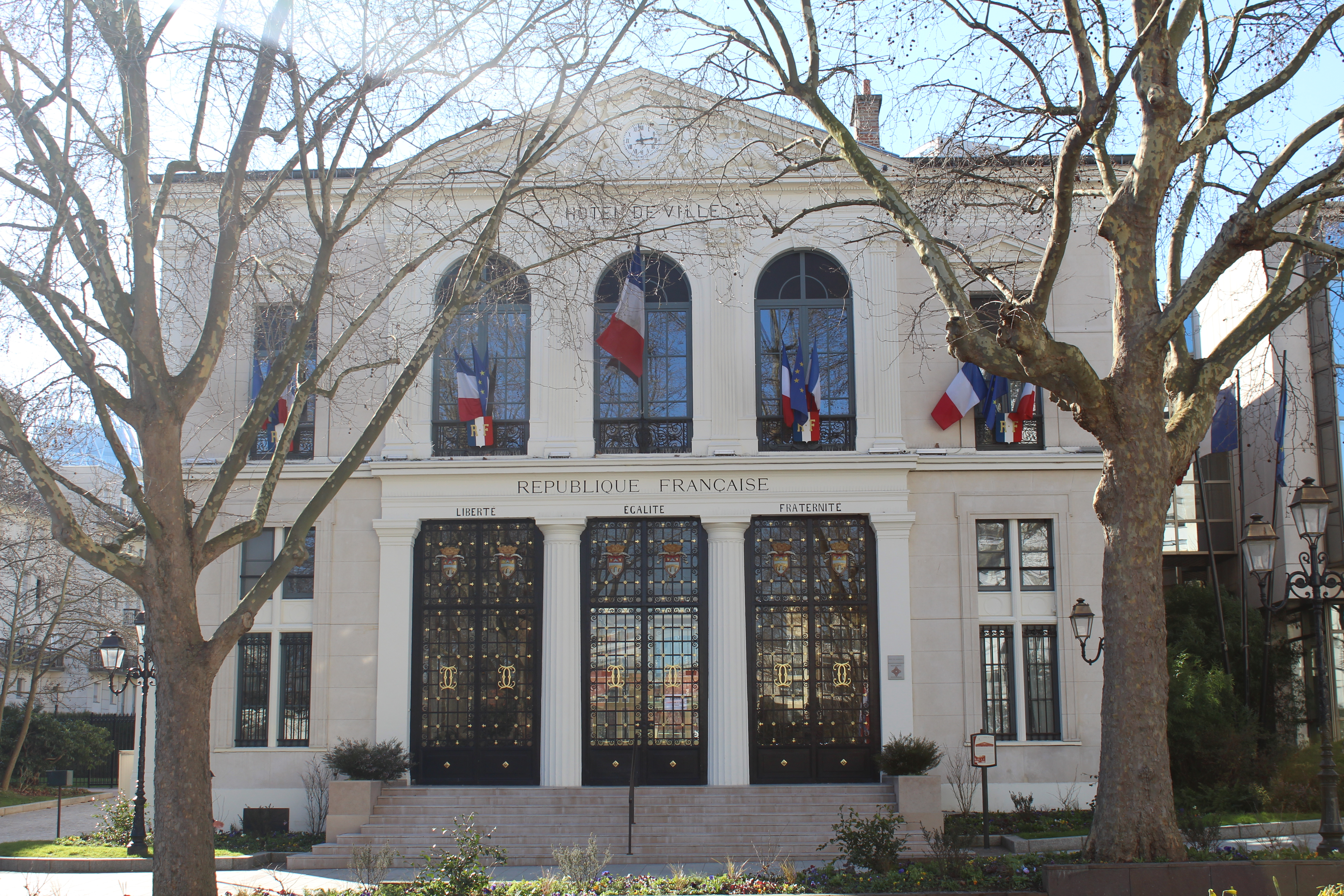
- The main frontage of the Hôtel de Ville in February 2018

General information
- Type: City hall
- Architectural style: Neoclassical style
- Location: Courbevoie, France
- Coordinates: 48.8952°N 2.2561°E
- Completed: 1858

Design and construction
- Architect: Paul-Eugène Lequeux

Monument historique
- Official name: Hôtel de ville
- Type: Inscrit
- Designated: 1980
- Reference no.: PA00088104

The Hôtel de Ville (French pronunciation: [otɛl də vil], City Hall) is a municipal building in Courbevoie, Hauts-de-Seine in the northwestern suburbs of Paris, France, standing on Rue de l'Hôtel de Ville. It was designated a monument historique by the French government in 1980.

== History ==
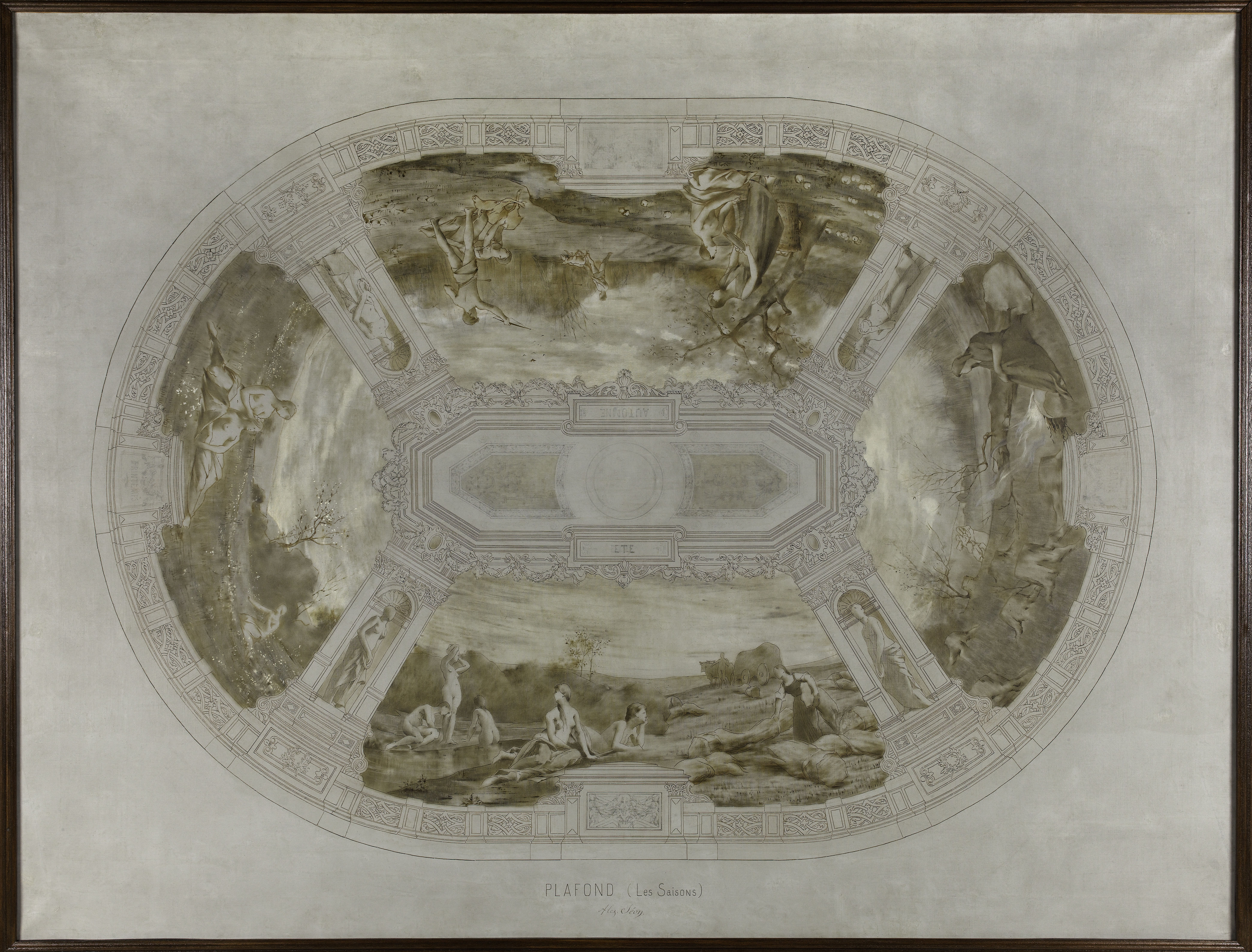
A sketch for the ceiling of the Salle des Mariages by Alexandre Séon

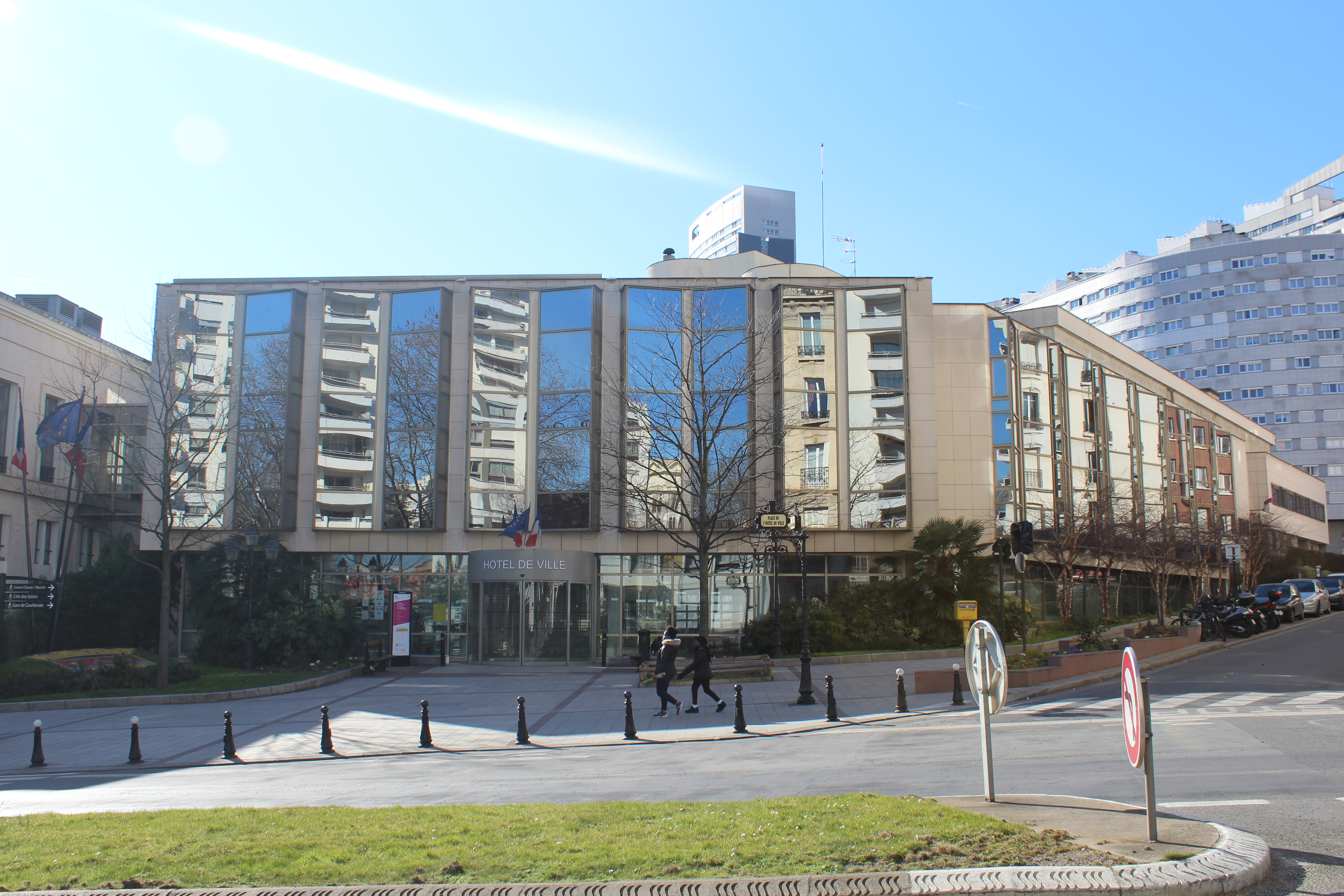
The new town hall building completed in 1983

The first municipal building in Courbevoie was a former guardhouse on Place Hérold which was paid for by public subscription and completed shortly after the French Revolution. It was expanded in 1819, but by the mid-19th century, it was inadequate and the town council decided to commission a new town hall. The site they selected was a rectangular site, just a short distance to the south, on what is now Rue de l'Hôtel de Ville. Construction of the new building started in 1857. It was designed by Paul-Eugène Lequeux in the neoclassical style, built in ashlar stone at a cost of FFr 84,000 and was officially opened by the mayor, Constant Sébastien Grébaut, in 1858.

The design involved a symmetrical main frontage of five bays facing onto Rue de l'Hôtel de Ville. The central section of three bays, which was slightly projected forward, featured a tetrastyle portico formed by Doric order pilasters supporting an entablature. On the first floor, there were three rounded headed windows flanked by Composite order pilasters supporting an entablature and a pediment. The pediment contained a clock supported by reclining female figures created by the sculptor, Louis Nicolas Adolphe Megret. The end bays were fenestrated by cross-windows on the ground floor, and by casement windows with pediments on the first floor. Internally, the principal rooms were the Salle du Conseil (council chamber) on the ground floor, and the Salle des Mariages (wedding room), which was 18.5 metres (61 ft) long and 14.2 metres (47 ft) wide, on the first floor.

The wedding room was decorated in the symbolist style with eight wall panels painted by Alexandre Séon depicting the phases of human life. The ceiling, also decorated by Séon, depicted the four seasons of the year. The work was completed by 1890. An annex to accommodate the police service and the library service was erected to the north of the main building in 1897.

During the Paris insurrection, part of the Second World War, German troops opened fire indiscriminately at a crowd of people assembled in front of the town hall on 21 August 1944. This was just four days before the liberation of the town by the French 2nd Armoured Division, commanded by General Philippe Leclerc, on 25 August 1944.

Activists opposed to Algerian independence, acting on behalf of the Organisation armée secrète, detonated a plastic bomb in a telephone booth on the ground floor of the town hall on the afternoon of 24 April 1961. Two officials and eight members of the public were hurt.

The police and library annex was demolished in the early 1980s, and replaced with large glass clad building, stretching back along Rue Albert Simonin, which was completed in 1983.
