= Nanterre-Université station =

Railway station in Nanterre, France

Nanterre-Université
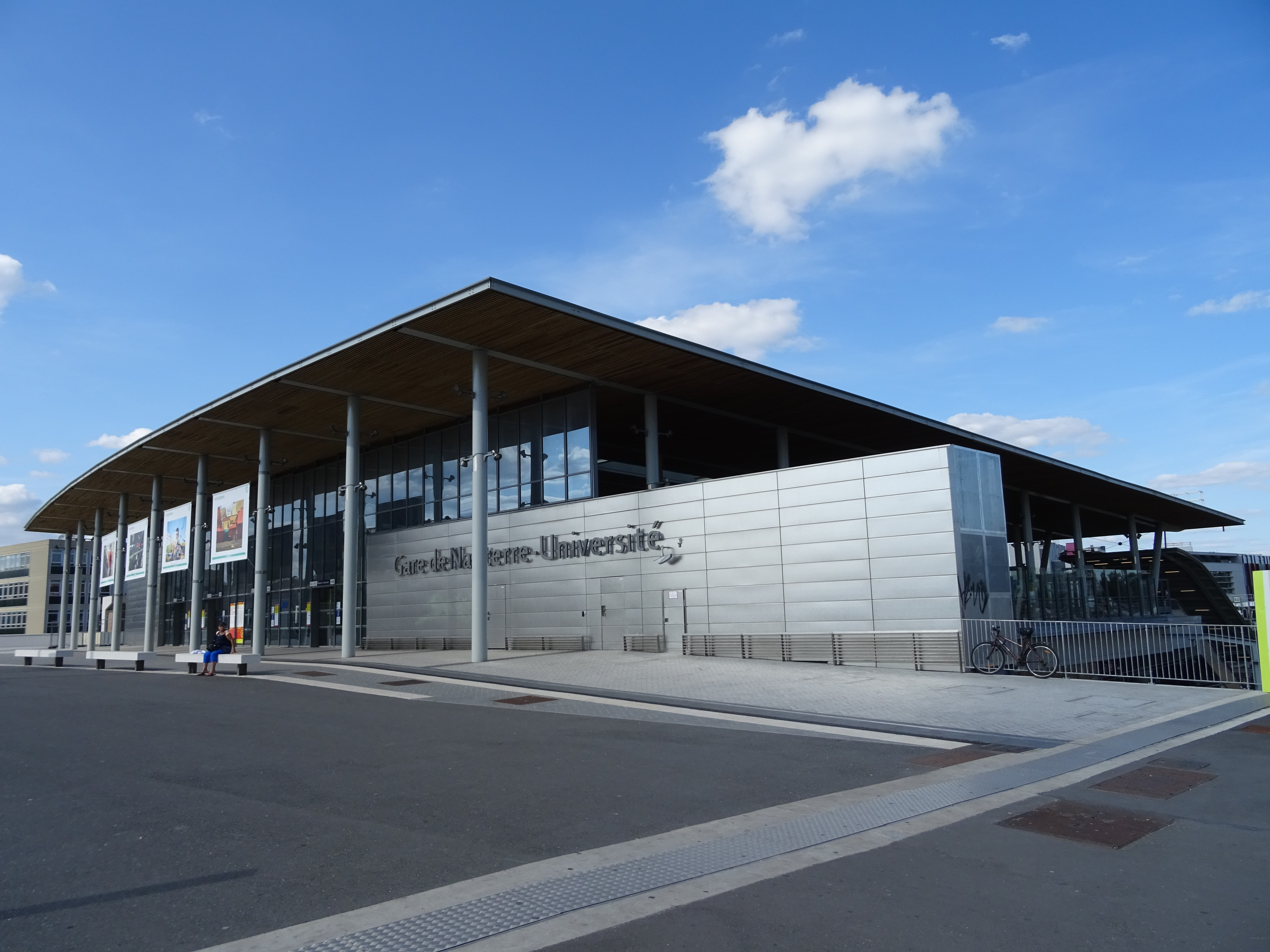
- Station entrance from Esplanade Patrice-Chéreau, 2017

General information
- Location: Esplanade Patrice-Chéreau; Nanterre; France
- Coordinates: 48°54′05″N 2°12′53″E
- Operator: RATP Group & SNCF
- Platforms: RER A: 1 island platform; Transilien L: 1 island platform with bay
- Tracks: 5
- Connections: RATP Bus: 259 276 304 367; Noctilien: N53

Construction
- Accessible: RER A: Yes, by request to staff; Transilien L: Yes, by prior reservation

Other information
- Station code: 87386318
- Fare zone: 3

History
- Opened: 1972
- Rebuilt: 2015

Passengers
- 2024: 7,569,899

Services
Preceding station	RER	Following station
Nanterre–Ville towards Saint-Germain-en-Laye	RER A	Nanterre–Préfecture towards Boissy-Saint-Léger
Preceding station	Transilien	Following station
Houilles–Carrières-sur-Seine towards Cergy-le-Haut	Line L	La Garenne-Colombes towards Paris–Saint Lazare
Location

Nanterre-Université (French pronunciation: [nɑ̃tɛʁ ynivɛʁsite]) is a French railway station on the line from Paris-Saint-Lazare to Saint-Germain-en-Laye, located in the commune of Nanterre. It takes its name from the fact that it is located next to the campus of the Paris Nanterre University.

The station is served by trains from Line A of the Réseau Express Régional traveling on the A1 branch to Saint-Germain-en-Laye, as well as by Line L of the Transilien Paris-Saint-Lazare network on the branch to Cergy-le-Haut.
