= Lycée Paul Lapie =

Senior high school in France

Coordinates: 48.9005°N 2.2564°E

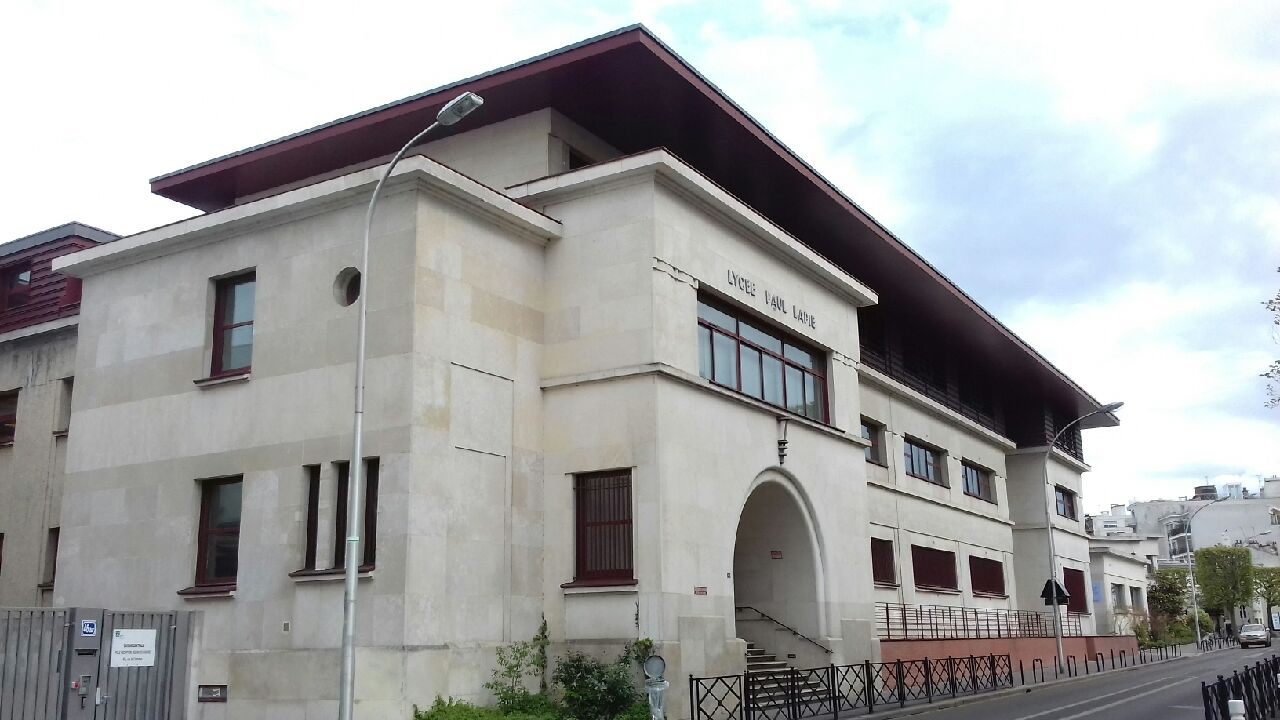
Lycée Paul Lapie

Lycée Paul Lapie (named after the sociologist Paul Lapie) is a French senior high school/sixth-form college in Courbevoie, Hauts-de-Seine, France, in the Paris metropolitan area.

The school building, designed by Florent Nanquette, opened in the fall of 1933. The school's design plans had been made in 1930.
