= Canton of Châtenay-Malabry =

Coordinates: 48.7667°N 2.2667°E

Châtenay-Malabry
- Canton
- Country: France
- Region: Île-de-France
- Department: Hauts-de-Seine
- No. of communes: {{{nbcomm}}}
- Area: 13.41 km^{2} (5.18 sq mi)
- Population (2023): 85,557
  - Density: 6,380/km^{2} (16,520/sq mi)
- INSEE code: 92 06

The canton of Châtenay-Malabry is a French administrative division, located in the arrondissement of Antony, in the Hauts-de-Seine département (Île-de-France région). Its borders were modified at the French canton reorganisation which came into effect in March 2015. Its seat is in Châtenay-Malabry.

== Composition ==
The canton consists of the following communes:

- Châtenay-Malabry
- Le Plessis-Robinson
- Sceaux

== Adjacent cantons ==
- Canton of Châtillon (north)
- Canton of Bagneux (northeast)
- Canton of Clamart (west)
- Canton of Antony (southeast)

== See also ==
- Cantons of the Hauts-de-Seine department
- Communes of the Hauts-de-Seine department
