= Canton of Bagneux =

Coordinates: 48.8000°N 2.3000°E

Bagneux
- Canton
- Country: France
- Region: Île-de-France
- Department: Hauts-de-Seine
- No. of communes: {{{nbcomm}}}
- Area: 6.05 km^{2} (2.34 sq mi)
- Population (2023): 65,591
  - Density: 10,800/km^{2} (28,100/sq mi)
- INSEE code: 9203

The canton of Bagneux is an administrative division of France, located in the Arrondissement of Antony, in the Hauts-de-Seine department and Île-de-France region. Following the French canton reorganisation that came into effect in March 2015, its borders were modified. Its seat is in Bagneux.

== Composition ==
It consists of the following communes:

- Bagneux
- Bourg-la-Reine

== Adjacent cantons ==
- Canton of Montrouge (north)
- Canton of Châtillon (west)
- Canton of Châtenay-Malabry (southwest)
- Canton of Antony (south)

== See also ==
- Cantons of the Hauts-de-Seine department
- Communes of the Hauts-de-Seine department
