= Canton of Clamart =

Coordinates: 48.8000°N 2.2667°E

Clamart
- Canton
- Country: France
- Region: Île-de-France
- Department: Hauts-de-Seine
- No. of communes: {{{nbcomm}}}
- Area: 10.33 km^{2} (3.99 sq mi)
- Population (2023): 87,198
  - Density: 8,441/km^{2} (21,860/sq mi)
- INSEE code: 92 08

The canton of Clamart is a French administrative division, located in the arrondissement of Antony, in the Hauts-de-Seine département (Île-de-France région). Its borders were modified at the French canton reorganisation which came into effect in March 2015. Its seat is in Clamart.

== Composition ==
The canton consists of the following communes:

- Clamart
- Vanves

== Adjacent cantons ==
- Canton of Montrouge (northeast)
- Canton of Issy-les-Moulineaux (northwest)
- Canton of Châtillon (east)
- Canton of Meudon (west)
- Canton of Châtenay-Malabry (southeast)

== See also ==
- Cantons of the Hauts-de-Seine department
- Communes of the Hauts-de-Seine department
