= Canton of Montrouge =

Coordinates: 48.8167°N 2.3167°E

Montrouge
- Canton
- Country: France
- Region: Île-de-France
- Department: Hauts-de-Seine
- No. of communes: {{{nbcomm}}}
- Area: 4.14 km^{2} (1.60 sq mi)
- Population (2023): 76,881
  - Density: 18,600/km^{2} (48,100/sq mi)
- INSEE code: 92 18

The canton of Montrouge is a French administrative division, located in the arrondissement of Antony, in the Hauts-de-Seine département (Île-de-France région). Its borders were modified at the French canton reorganisation which came into effect in March 2015. Its seat is in Montrouge.

== Composition ==
The canton consists of the following communes:

- Malakoff
- Montrouge

== Adjacent cantons ==
- Canton of Clamart (west)
- Canton of Châtillon (south)
- Canton of Bagneux (south)

== See also ==
- Cantons of the Hauts-de-Seine department
- Communes of the Hauts-de-Seine department
