= Canton of Châtillon =

Coordinates: 48.8000°N 2.2833°E

Châtillon
- Canton
- Country: France
- Region: Île-de-France
- Department: Hauts-de-Seine
- No. of communes: {{{nbcomm}}}
- Area: 5.43 km^{2} (2.10 sq mi)
- Population (2023): 60,775
  - Density: 11,200/km^{2} (29,000/sq mi)
- INSEE code: 92 07

The canton of Châtillon is a French administrative division, located in the arrondissement of Antony, in the Hauts-de-Seine département (Île-de-France région). Its borders were modified at the French canton reorganisation which came into effect in March 2015. Its seat is in Châtillon.

== Composition ==
The canton consists of the following communes:

- Châtillon
- Fontenay-aux-Roses

== Adjacent cantons ==
- Canton of Montrouge (north)
- Canton of Bagneux (east)
- Canton of Clamart (west)
- Canton of Châtenay-Malabry (south)

== See also ==
- Cantons of the Hauts-de-Seine department
- Communes of the Hauts-de-Seine department
