= Cantons of the Hauts-de-Seine department =

The following is a list of the 23 cantons of the Hauts-de-Seine department, in France, following the French canton reorganisation which came into effect in March 2015:

- Antony
- Asnières-sur-Seine
- Bagneux
- Boulogne-Billancourt-1
- Boulogne-Billancourt-2
- Châtenay-Malabry
- Châtillon
- Clamart
- Clichy
- Colombes-1
- Colombes-2
- Courbevoie-1
- Courbevoie-2
- Gennevilliers
- Issy-les-Moulineaux
- Levallois-Perret
- Meudon
- Montrouge
- Nanterre-1
- Nanterre-2
- Neuilly-sur-Seine
- Rueil-Malmaison
- Saint-Cloud
