= Arrondissements of the Hauts-de-Seine department =

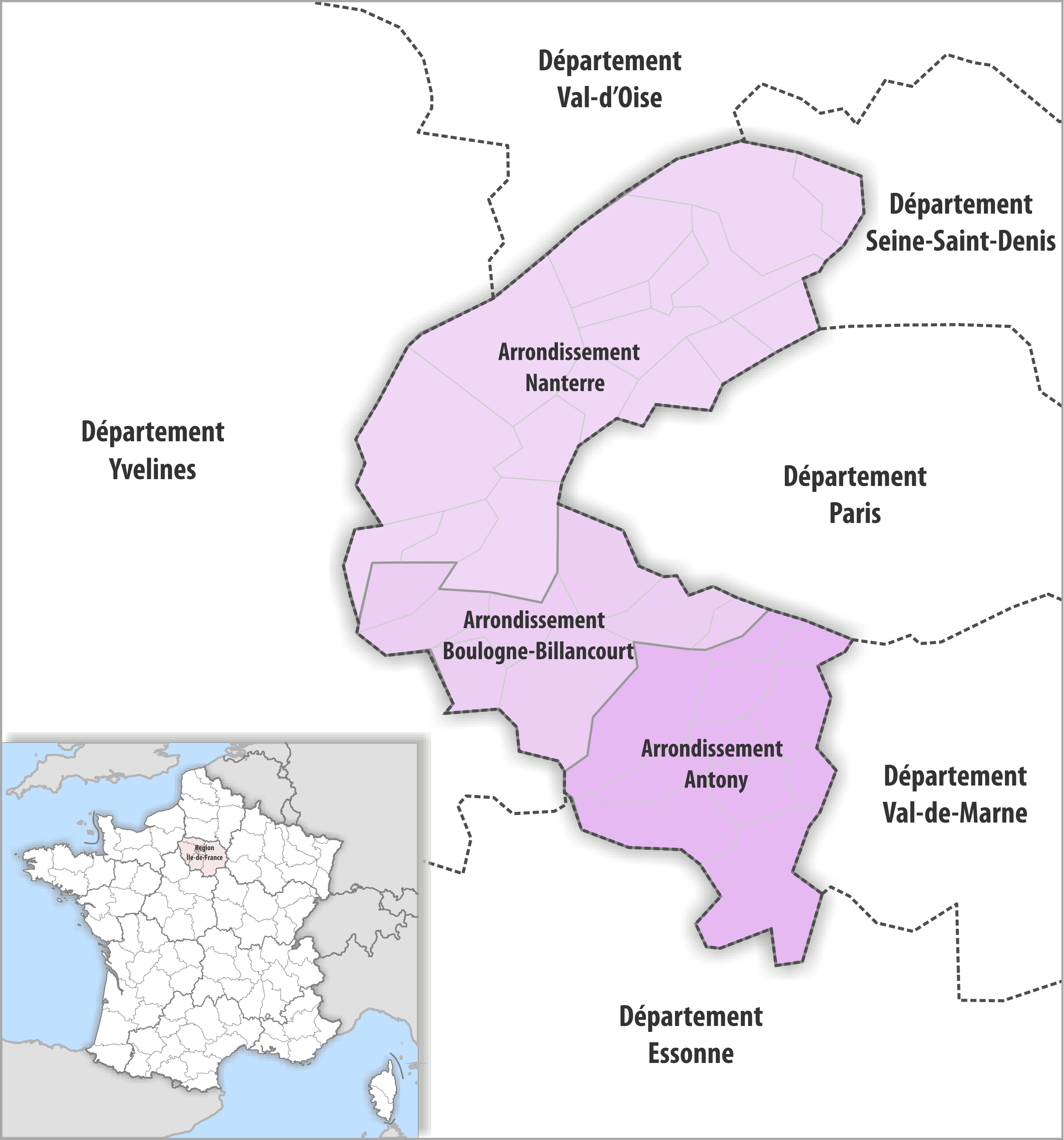
Map of arrondissements of the Hauts-de-Seine department.

The 3 arrondissements of the Hauts-de-Seine department are:

1. Arrondissement of Antony, (subprefecture: Antony) with 11 communes. The population of the arrondissement was 406,344 in 2021.
2. Arrondissement of Boulogne-Billancourt, (subprefecture: Boulogne-Billancourt) with 8 communes. The population of the arrondissement was 317,792 in 2021.
3. Arrondissement of Nanterre, (prefecture of the Hauts-de-Seine department: Nanterre) with 17 communes. The population of the arrondissement was 911,155 in 2021.

== History ==
In 1800 the arrondissement of Sceaux was established as part of the department Seine. It was disbanded in 1962. In 1964 the arrondissement of Nanterre was established. The arrondissement of Antony was created in 1966. In 1968 the department Hauts-de-Seine was created from parts of the former departments Seine and Seine-et-Oise, and the arrondissements of Nanterre and Antony became part of it. The arrondissement of Boulogne-Billancourt was created in January 1973.

In January 2017 one commune passed from the arrondissement of Antony to the arrondissement of Boulogne-Billancourt and two communes passed from the arrondissement of Boulogne-Billancourt to the arrondissement of Nanterre.
