= Hôtel de Ville, Fontenay-aux-Roses =

Town hall in Fontenay-aux-Roses, France

Hôtel de Ville
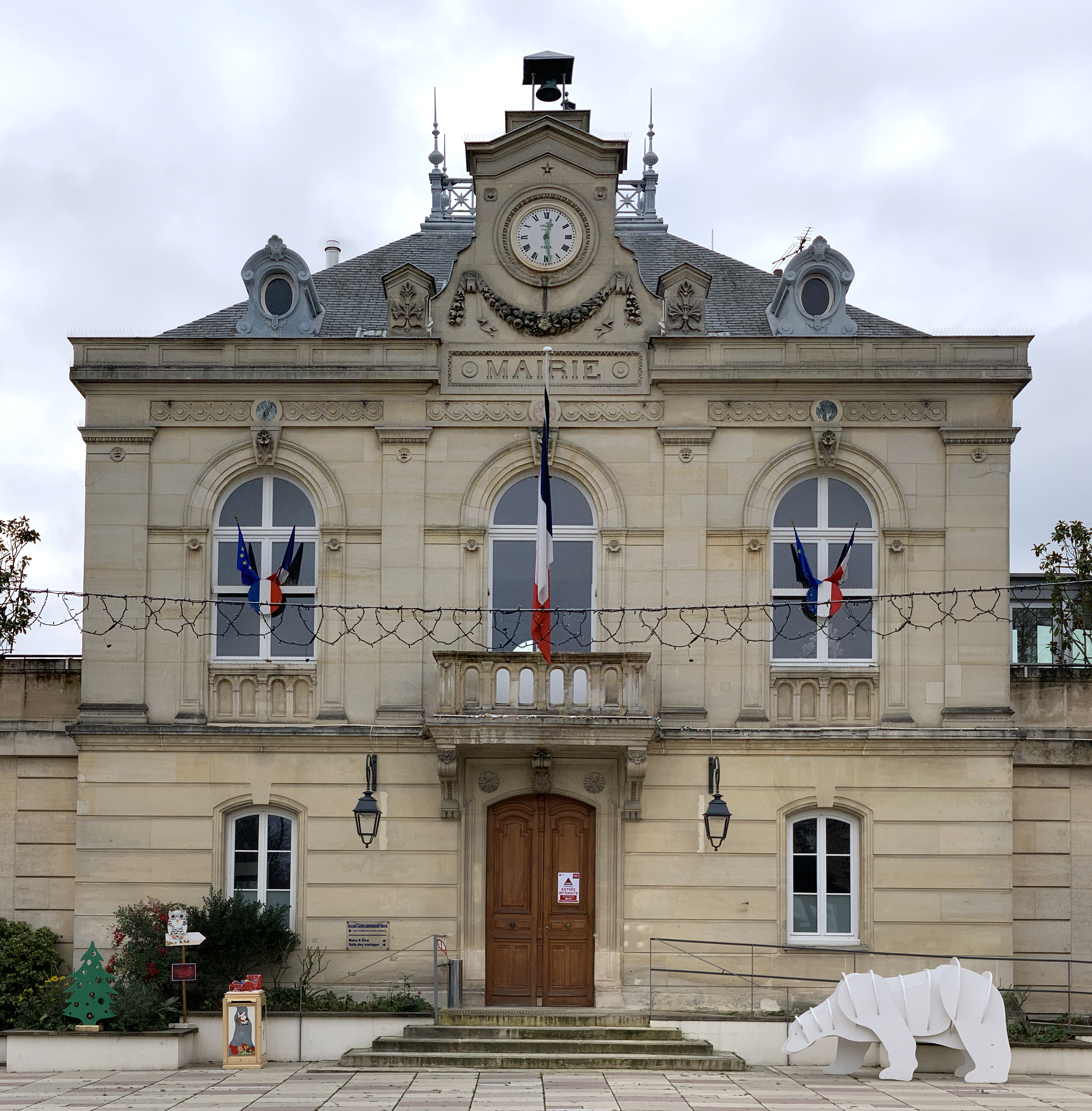
- The main frontage of the Hôtel de Ville in January 2021

General information
- Type: City hall
- Architectural style: Neoclassical style
- Location: Fontenay-aux-Roses, France
- Coordinates: 48.7912°N 2.2865°E
- Completed: 1860

Design and construction
- Architect: Claude Naissant

The Hôtel de Ville (French pronunciation: [otɛl də vil], City Hall) is a municipal building in Fontenay-aux-Roses, Hauts-de-Seine, in the southwestern suburbs of Paris, standing on Rue Boucicaut. It has been included on the Inventaire général des monuments by the French Ministry of Culture since 1993.

== History ==
Following the French Revolution, meetings of the town council were initially held in the Church of Saint Peter and Saint Paul or in the house of the mayor at the time. This arrangement continued until 1853, when the council led by the mayor, Jean Colin, decided to commission a dedicated town hall. The site they selected was on the southwestern side of the Grand Rue (now Rue Boucicaut). The new building was designed by Claude Naissant in the neoclassical style, built in ashlar stone and was completed in 1860.

The design involved a symmetrical main frontage of three bays facing onto the street. The central bay featured a segmental-headed doorway with a hood mould, a keystone and medallions in the spandrels. There was a round-headed French door with a moulded surround, a keystone and a balustraded balcony on the first floor, and a clock above. The outer bays were fenestrated by segmental-headed windows with moulded surrounds and keystones on the ground floor and by round-headed windows with moulded surrounds and keystones on the first floor. The bays on the first floor were flanked by Doric order pilasters supporting a frieze, a cornice and a parapet. There were two small dormer windows at attic level. Internally, the principal room was the Salle du Conseil (council chamber).

A gate and an entrance pavilion were added in front of the building in 1863, and additional land was acquired from Sieur Laboissière to create a public square in 1865. The council was evacuated to Rue de Sèvres in central Paris during the Franco-Prussian War of 1870 and, when the council returned, they found the building had been badly damaged by Prussian troops and commissioned a programme of restoration works.

A war memorial, in the form of a female figure sitting on a pedestal, was designed by the sculptor, Raphaël Moncassin, to commemorate the lives of local service personnel who died in the First World War, and was installed in the public square opposite the building (now Place du Général-de-Gaulle) in July 1922. Elements of the French Resistance seized the town hall and installed a liberation committee on 20 August 1944. This was five days before the official liberation of the town by the French 2nd Armoured Division, commanded by General Philippe Leclerc, on 25 August 1944.

In the early 1980s, the building was extended by the addition of two single-storey wings of two bays each, and the forecourt was expanded. The forecourt of the town hall was remodelled in late 2018; an oval-shaped flower bed was removed and a square-shaped water feature was installed instead.
