= Departmental Council of Hauts-de-Seine =

Departmental legislature in France

The Departmental Council of Hauts-de-Seine (French: Conseil départemental des Hauts-de-Seine) is the deliberative assembly of the Hauts-de-Seine department. It consists of 46 members (general councilors) and its headquarters are in Nanterre, capital of the department, and the president is Georges Siffredi. The departmental councilors are elected for a 6-years term. The Hauts-de-Seine general council includes 8 vice-presidents.

== Positions ==
=== President ===
The president of the General Council is currently Georges Siffredi of Les Républicains.

=== Vice-presidents ===
- Jean-Yves Bony, 1st vice-president
- Sylvie Lachaize, 2nd vice-president
- Bernard Delcros, 3rd vice-president

=== General councilors ===
The General Council consists of 46 general councilors (conseillers généraux) who come from the 15 cantons of Hauts-de-Seine.

== See also ==
- Hauts-de-Seine
- General councils of France
