= Arrondissement of Antony =

Coordinates: 48°45′19″N 2°18′02″E

Antony
- Arrondissement
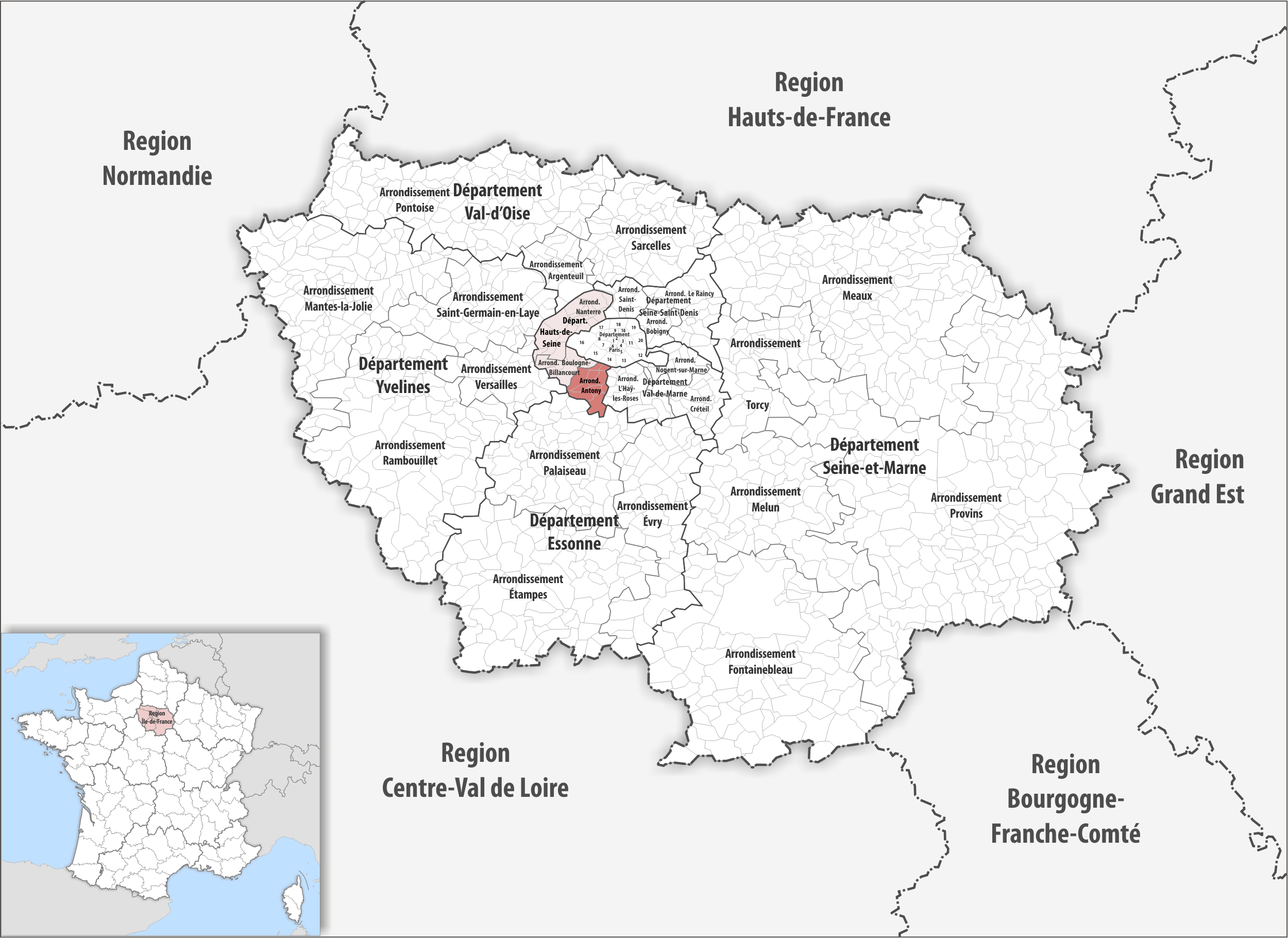
- Location within the region Île-de-France
- Country: France
- Region: Île-de-France
- Department: Hauts-de-Seine
- No. of communes: {{{nbcomm}}}
- Area: 47.4 km^{2} (18.3 sq mi)
- Population (2023): 411,643
  - Density: 8,680/km^{2} (22,500/sq mi)
- INSEE code: 921

The arrondissement of Antony is an arrondissement of France in the Hauts-de-Seine department in the Île-de-France region. It has 11 communes. Its population is 406,344 (2021), and its area is 47.4 km^{2} (18.3 sq mi).

== Composition ==
The communes of the arrondissement of Antony, and their INSEE codes, are:

1. Antony (92002)
2. Bagneux (92007)
3. Bourg-la-Reine (92014)
4. Châtenay-Malabry (92019)
5. Châtillon (92020)
6. Clamart (92023)
7. Fontenay-aux-Roses (92032)
8. Malakoff (92046)
9. Montrouge (92049)
10. Le Plessis-Robinson (92060)
11. Sceaux (92071)

== History ==
The arrondissement of Antony was created in 1966 as part of the department Seine. In 1968 it became part of the new department Hauts-de-Seine. At the January 2017 reorganisation of the arrondissements of Hauts-de-Seine, it lost one commune to the arrondissement of Boulogne-Billancourt.

As a result of the reorganisation of the cantons of France which came into effect in 2015, the borders of the cantons are no longer related to the borders of the arrondissements. The cantons of the arrondissement of Antony were, as of January 2015:

1. Antony
2. Bagneux
3. Bourg-la-Reine
4. Châtenay-Malabry
5. Châtillon
6. Clamart
7. Fontenay-aux-Roses
8. Malakoff
9. Montrouge
10. Le Plessis-Robinson
11. Sceaux
12. Vanves

== Sub-prefects ==
- Gérard Bougrier : 1993 - 8 February 1996 : sub-prefect of Antony
