= Clamart =

- Commune
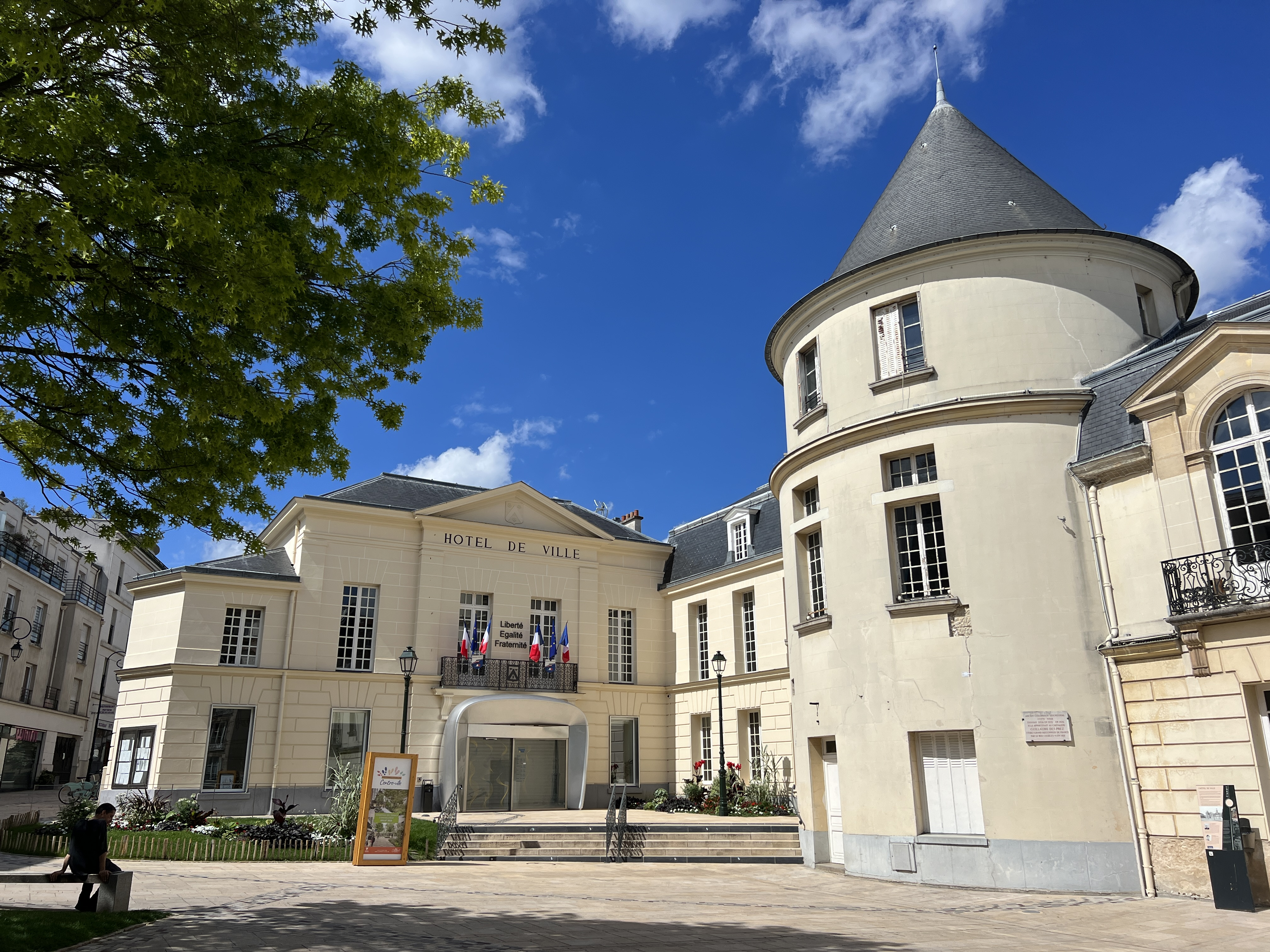
- The Hôtel de Ville

- Coat of arms

- Location (in red) within Paris inner suburbs
- Location of Clamart
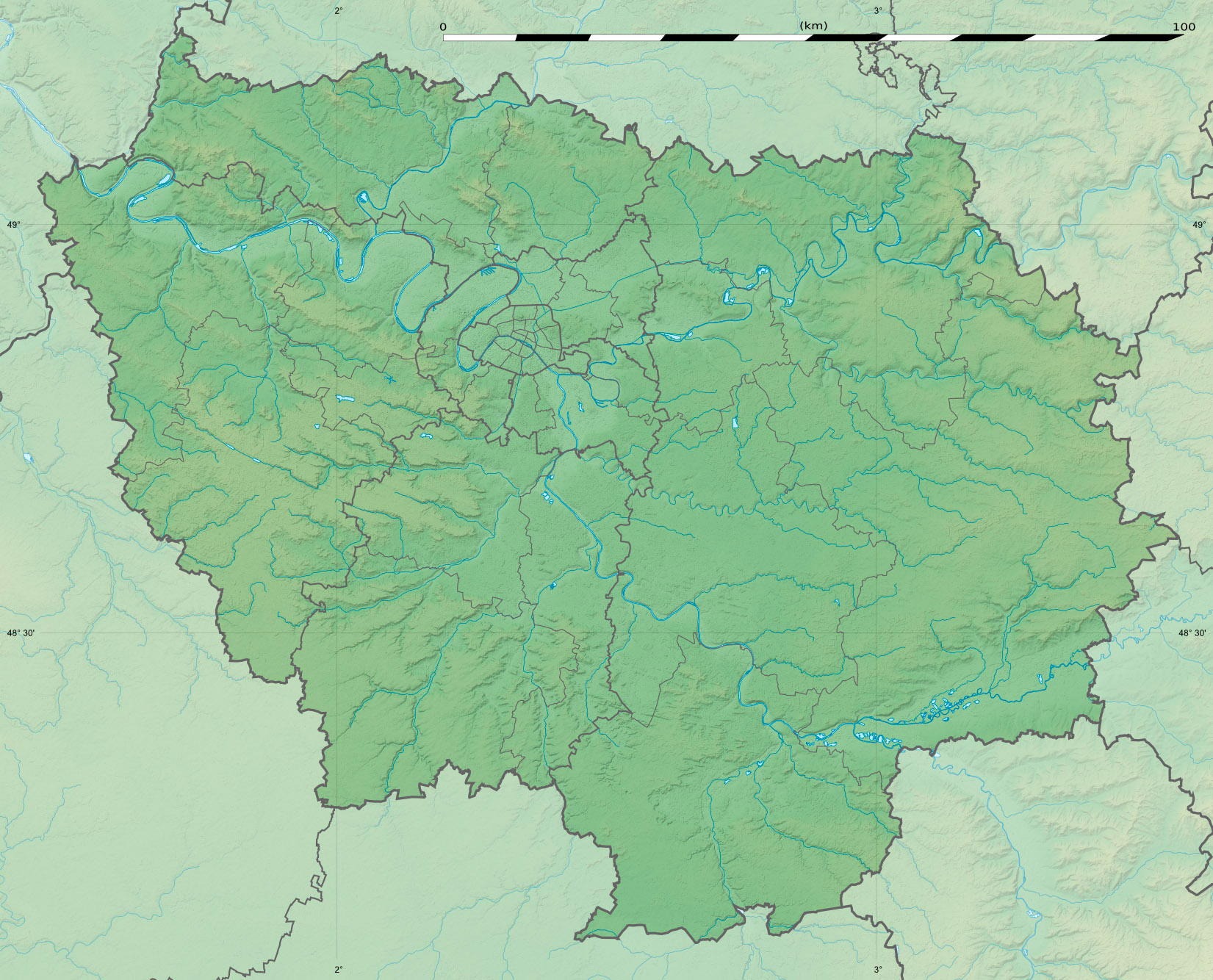
- Location within France Location within Île-de-France (region)
- Coordinates: 48°48′05″N 2°15′46″E
- Country: France
- Region: Île-de-France
- Department: Hauts-de-Seine
- Arrondissement: Antony
- Canton: Clamart
- Intercommunality: Grand Paris

Government
  - Mayor (2026–32): Yves Coscas
- Area^{1}: 8.77 km^{2} (3.39 sq mi)
- Highest elevation: 175 m (574 ft)
- Lowest elevation: 64 m (210 ft)
- Population (2023): 58,576
  - Density: 6,680/km^{2} (17,300/sq mi)
- Demonym: Clamartois
- Time zone: UTC+01:00 (CET)
  - Summer (DST): UTC+02:00 (CEST)
- INSEE/Postal code: 92023 /92140
- Website: www.clamart.fr
- ^{1} French Land Register data, which excludes lakes, ponds, glaciers > 1 km^{2} (0.386 sq mi or 247 acres) and river estuaries.

Clamart (French pronunciation: [klamaʁ]) is a commune in the southwestern suburbs of Paris, France. It is in Hauts-de-Seine, 8.7 km (5.4 mi) from the centre of Paris, on the border with both Essonne and Yvelines.

The town is divided into two parts, separated by a forest (the Bois de Clamart, part of the larger Forêt domaniale de Meudon): Bas-Clamart, the historical centre, and Petit-Clamart, with urbanisation developed in the 1960s replacing pea fields. The canton of Clamart includes only part of the commune; the other part of the commune belongs to the canton of Le Plessis-Robinson.

It is a relatively wealthy suburb of Paris. It is above Clamart that renowned photographer Nadar took the world's first aerial photograph in 1858.

== Geography ==
=== Neighbourhoods ===
Clamart is divided in seven neighbourhoods: Centre, Plaine, Gare, Petit-Clamart-Trivaux-Garenne, Jardin parisien-Panorama-Soleil levant, Galvents-Corby and Percy-Schneider.

=== Nearest places ===
Neighbouring communes are: Issy-les-Moulineaux, Vanves, Malakoff, Châtillon, Fontenay-aux-Roses, Le Plessis-Robinson, Bièvres, Châtenay-Malabry, Vélizy-Villacoublay and Meudon.

== History ==
=== Les petits pois (peas) ===
The city name is famous in French gastronomy. A speciality with peas as a side-dish, is called "à la Clamart". Close to Paris and its central marketplace (Les Halles), Clamart's peas were the first of the season.

=== Hôtel de Ville ===
The town's Hôtel de Ville was created from an ancient château which was acquired by the town council in 1842.

=== De Gaulle assassination attempt ===
On 22 August 1962 the French President Charles de Gaulle was the target of an assassination attempt organised by the French Air Force Lieutenant-Colonel Jean Bastien-Thiry. As de Gaulle's black Citroën DS 19 sped through Petit-Clamart it was met by a barrage of submachine-gun fire. De Gaulle and his entourage, which included his wife, survived the attempt without any casualties or serious injuries while the attempt's perpetrators were subsequently all arrested and put on trial. The leader of the assassination attempt, Jean Bastien-Thiry, was executed by firing squad after his 1963 conviction, and remains the most recent person to be executed by firing squad in France.

== Population ==
Historical population

Year	Pop.	±% p.a.
1793	969	—
1800	736	−3.85%
1806	740	+0.09%
1821	1,022	+2.18%
1831	1,225	+1.83%
1836	1,268	+0.69%
1841	1,567	+4.33%
1846	1,564	−0.04%
1851	1,763	+2.42%
1856	2,149	+4.04%
1861	2,751	+5.06%
1866	3,194	+3.03%
1872	3,163	−0.16%
1876	3,640	+3.57%
1881	4,187	+2.84%
1886	5,112	+4.07%
1891	5,491	+1.44%
1896	6,283	+2.73%
1901	7,391	+3.30%

Year	Pop.	±% p.a.
1906	8,720	+3.36%
1911	11,376	+5.46%
1921	15,916	+3.42%
1926	22,734	+7.39%
1931	31,047	+6.43%
1936	32,427	+0.87%
1946	33,817	+0.42%
1954	37,924	+1.44%
1962	47,991	+2.99%
1968	54,906	+2.27%
1975	52,952	−0.52%
1982	48,353	−1.29%
1990	47,227	−0.29%
1999	48,572	+0.31%
2007	51,000	+0.61%
2012	52,408	+0.55%
2017	52,971	+0.21%
2023	58,576	+1.69%

Source: EHESS and INSEE (1968–2023)

== Panorama ==
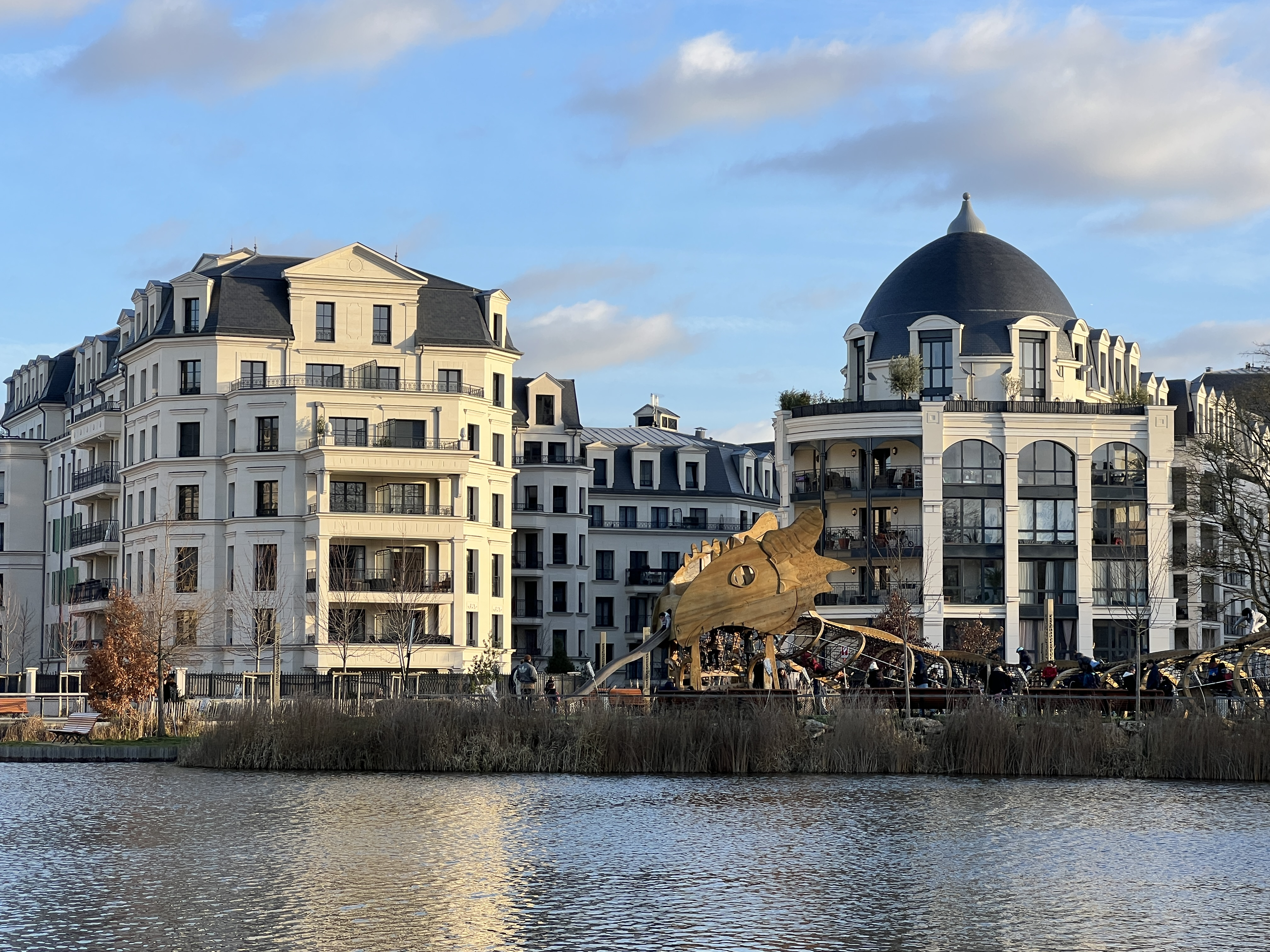
New urban development (ZAC) in the Panorama district

On a former Électricité de France research site, construction on a new urban development (zone d'aménagement concerté or ZAC), overlooking the man-made Panorama Lake (Lac du Panorama) and consisting of new homes, commercial and business space, two schools, and a nursery, began in summer 2018. The land had been purchased by the city in 2017, and the project was designed by A26. The first residents moved in during late 2019, and the schools were two thirds full by 2021 when the second phase of construction was underway.

== Transport ==
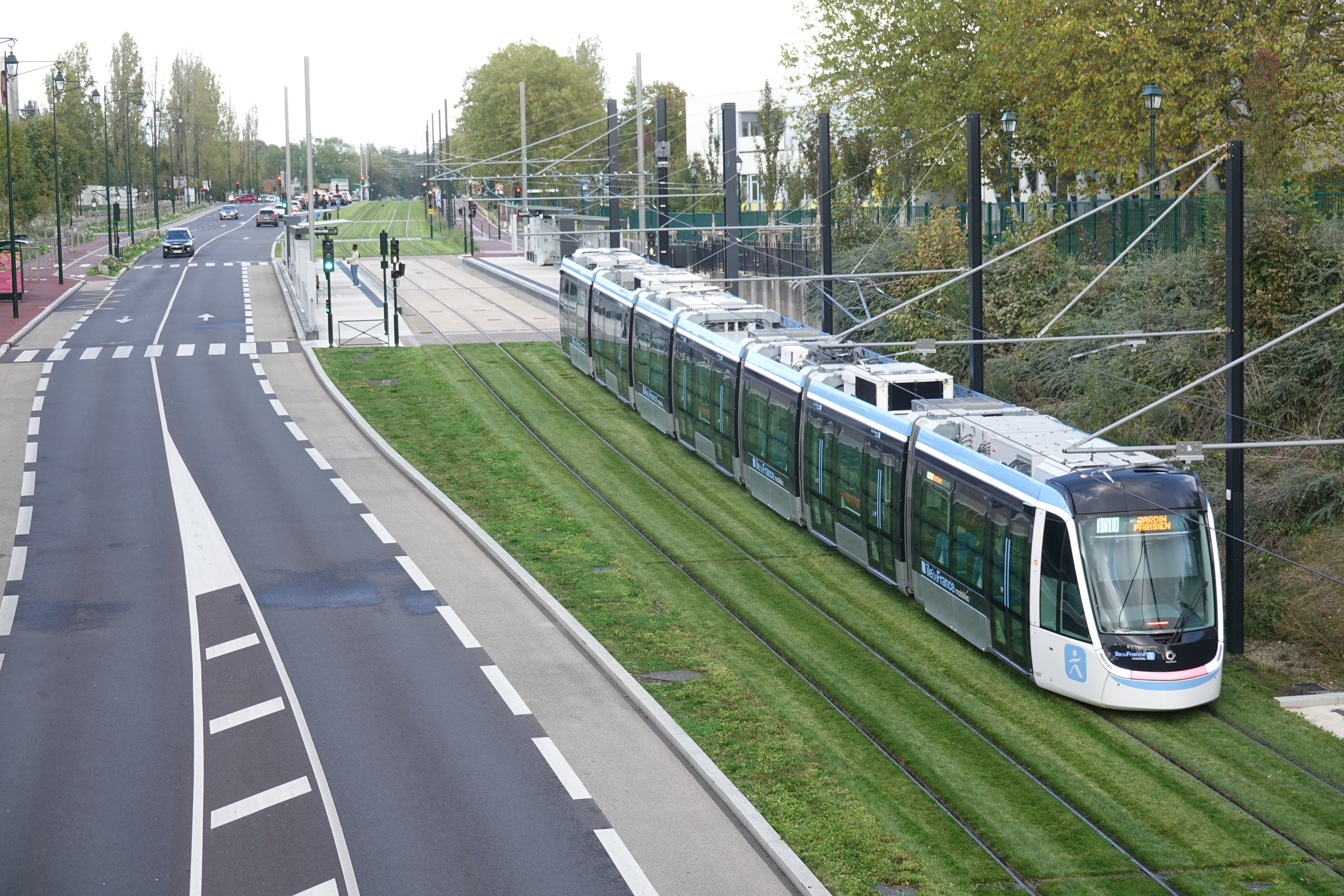
Tram on Line 10 approaching Hôpital Béclère in Clamart, where it connects with Line 6.

Clamart is served by Clamart station on the Transilien Line N suburban rail line, which will also become an underground Paris Métro station upon the opening of Line 15 in 2027.

Clamart is also served by Île-de-France tramway Lines 6 and 10. Since opening in 2023 Line 10 has ended at Jardin Parisien south of the Bois the Clamart; a tunnel will extend the line northwards to Clamart station with two intermediate stops under the town centre. The projected opening date is 2032. There are also several bus lines connecting Clamart to neighbouring towns.

== Education ==
Clamart has multiple primary schools, and attendance is determined by one's residence.

Middle schools:

- Collège Alain Founier
- Collège Maison Blanche

High school: Clamart has one single high school, located near the Haut de Clamart: the Lycée Jacques Monod.

== Notable people ==
- Yasser Arafat (1929–2004), Palestinian leader, died in the Hôpital d'instruction des armées Percy in 2004.
- Hatem Ben Arfa (born 1987), footballer, was born here.
- Jean Arp (1886–1966) and Sophie Taeuber-Arp (1889–1943), artists, lived in Clamart in the 1930s.
- Pierre Mauroy (1928-2013), French Prime Minister, died in 2013.
- Gabriel Attal (born 1989), French Prime Minister, was born here.
- Éliane Basse (1899–1985), French paleontologist and geologist, died in Clamart
- Jean Bastien-Thiry (1927–1963), leader of 1962 assassination attempt against Charles de Gaulle.
- Nikolai Berdyaev (1874–1948), Russian philosopher and theologian, died here.
- Alexander Blonz (born 2000), Norwegian handball player, lived here the first year of his life.
- Céline Boutier (born 1993), French golfer, was born here.
- Teddy Clairet (born 1993), French racing driver
- Roger Cotte (1921–1999), French recorder player and musicologist, was born in Clamart.
- Beauford Delaney (1901–1979), American artist, moved to Clamart in 1953.
- Julien Kapek (born 1979), French athlete.
- Henri Matisse (1869–1954), French painter, lived in Clamart before the First World War.
- Vincent Poirier (born 1993), French basketball player was born here.
- Owen Tangavelou (born 2005), Vietnamese-French racing driver
- Theofan (Bystrov) (1875–1940), Russian archbishop and theologian, lived here in 1931.

== International relations ==
Clamart is twinned with:

- Lüneburg, Germany since 1975
- Scunthorpe, United Kingdom, since 1976
- Majadahonda, Spain, since 1988
- Artashat, Armenia, since 2003
- Penamacor, Portugal, since 2006

== See also ==
- Communes of the Hauts-de-Seine department
- The statue La Source in Clamart is by Pierre Charles Lenoir
