= Châtillon, Hauts-de-Seine =

Châtillon
- Commune
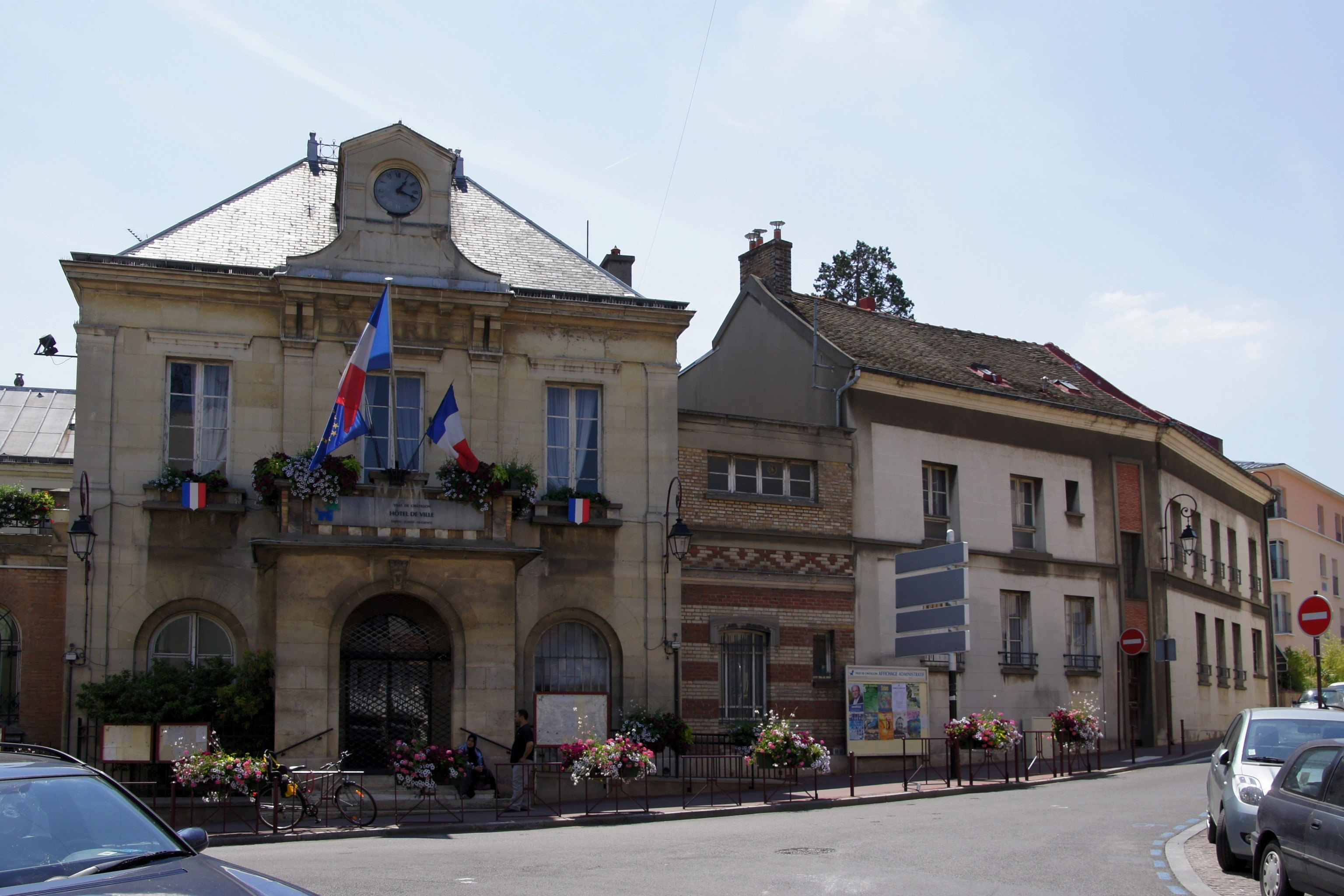
- The Hôtel de Ville

- Coat of arms

- Location (in red) within Paris inner suburbs
- Location of Châtillon
- Location within France Location within Île-de-France (region)
- Coordinates: 48°48′00″N 2°17′24″E
- Country: France
- Region: Île-de-France
- Department: Hauts-de-Seine
- Arrondissement: Antony
- Canton: Châtillon
- Intercommunality: Grand Paris

Government
  - Mayor (2026–32): Nadège Azzaz
- Area^{1}: 2.92 km^{2} (1.13 sq mi)
- Elevation: 60 m (200 ft)
- Population (2023): 36,705
  - Density: 12,600/km^{2} (32,600/sq mi)
- Time zone: UTC+01:00 (CET)
  - Summer (DST): UTC+02:00 (CEST)
- INSEE/Postal code: 92020 /92320
- ^{1} French Land Register data, which excludes lakes, ponds, glaciers > 1 km^{2} (0.386 sq mi or 247 acres) and river estuaries.

Châtillon (French pronunciation: [ʃatijɔ̃]) is a commune in the southwestern suburbs of Paris, France. It is located 7 km (4.3 mi) from the center of Paris.

The town was formerly named Châtillon-sous-Bagneux, and a relic of this denomination remains in at least one road sign in Vanves (located at the junction Boulevard du Lycée and Avenue Charles de Gaulle, and written as Châtillon s/ B).

The TGV trains are maintained at the "Établissement Industriel de Maintenance du TGV de Châtillon" (EIM TGV de Châtillon).

== History ==
The name of the town is first documented in 1192 in the archives of St-Martin-des-Champs Priory in Medieval Latin as "Castellio" ("little castle"). It is not known where this castle was located. Two possible locations are the heights of Châtillon (to the southwest) or in the former market town on the manor. This manor was owned by the Abbey of Saint-Germain-des-Prés until 1600, when it was sold to Richard Tardieu. The small town grew slowly. During the 14th century a chapel dedicated to a Saint Eutropius was built and a parish established. In addition to agriculture, the exploitation of a rock quarry provided an economic basis for the town.

In 1417, during the Armagnac–Burgundian Civil War, John the Fearless, Duke of Burgundy, camped at Châtillon for eight days while his army pillaged the surrounding villages before laying siege to Montlhéry.

From 1790 to 1795 Châtillon was a canton of the district of Bourg-de-l'Égalité.

In 1815 the British, who had crossed the Seine at Sèvres, occupied the heights of Châtillon and pillaged the village. The Tour des Anglais, located in southwest part of the town, was built on the ruins of a former tower that was part of the fortifications of the area, and was later used as a windmill. The Hôtel de Ville was completed in 1851.

During the Siege of Paris, Châtillon was the site of two battles: the First Battle of Châtillon (17–19 September 1870) as the Prussian army invested Paris, and the Second Battle of Châtillon (13 October 1870), in which the II Bavarian Corps was driven from Châtillon, although ultimately the French were forced to retire in face of Prussian artillery.

== Population ==
Historical population

Year	Pop.	±% p.a.
1793	1,065	—
1800	769	−4.55%
1806	755	−0.31%
1821	793	+0.33%
1831	1,098	+3.31%
1836	1,148	+0.89%
1841	1,416	+4.29%
1846	1,556	+1.90%
1851	1,329	−3.10%
1856	1,810	+6.37%
1861	2,050	+2.52%
1866	2,238	+1.77%
1872	1,807	−3.50%
1876	2,080	+3.58%
1881	2,260	+1.67%
1886	2,389	+1.12%
1891	2,426	+0.31%
1896	3,096	+5.00%
1901	3,353	+1.61%

Year	Pop.	±% p.a.
1906	3,535	+1.06%
1911	4,203	+3.52%
1921	5,588	+2.89%
1926	7,488	+6.03%
1931	9,701	+5.31%
1936	10,895	+2.35%
1946	11,673	+0.69%
1954	12,526	+0.89%
1962	20,934	+6.63%
1968	24,640	+2.75%
1975	26,574	+1.09%
1982	24,834	−0.96%
1990	26,411	+0.77%
1999	28,622	+0.90%
2007	32,609	+1.64%
2012	34,960	+1.40%
2017	37,355	+1.33%
2023	36,705	−0.29%

Source: EHESS and INSEE (1968-2023)

== Adjacent communes ==
- Bagneux
- Clamart
- Fontenay-aux-Roses
- Malakoff
- Montrouge

== Transport ==
Châtillon is served by Châtillon – Montrouge station on Paris Métro Line 13.

Châtillon enjoys a well connected bus service: from Paris, the 68 travels from the Place de Clichy to the metro station. Buses 194, 195 and 295 all leave Porte d'Orléans and pass by the Châtillon – Montrouge metro station. From there they continue mostly in different directions. The 162 running east and west of Châtillon connects to the RER station in Meudon and the shopping centre to the east. The 394 which passes by the market can be used to access Clamart, Vanves, and Issy-les-Moulineaux. The 126 connects the metro and Issy.

Châtillon also hosts music festivals.

== Twin towns – sister cities ==
Châtillon is twinned with:

- Aywaille, Belgium
- Genzano di Roma, Italy
- Merseburg, Germany

== See also ==
- Communes of the Hauts-de-Seine department
