= Fontenay-aux-Roses =

- Commune
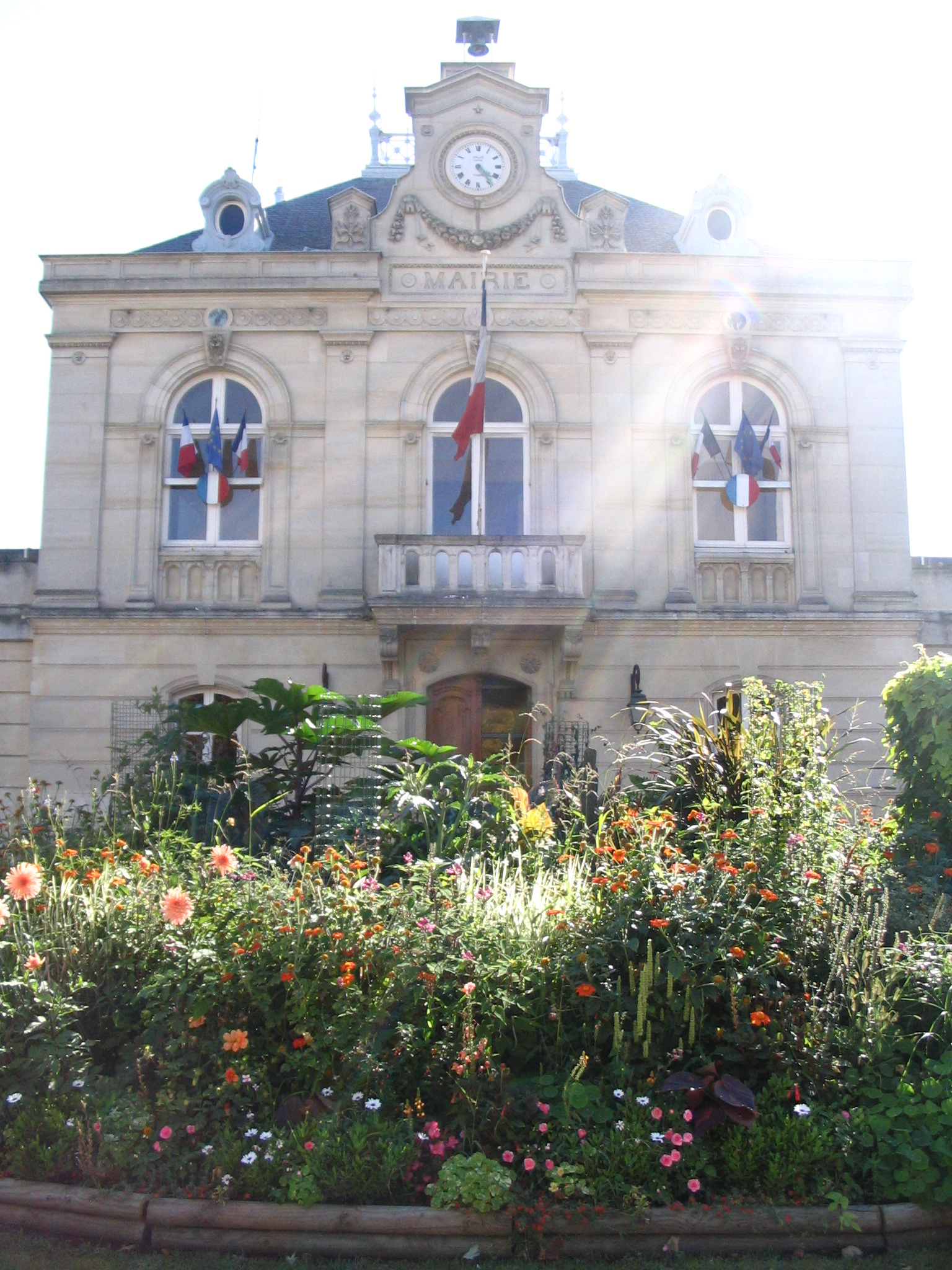
- The Hôtel de Ville

- Coat of arms

- Location (in red) within Paris inner suburbs
- Location of Fontenay-aux-Roses
- Location within France Location within Île-de-France (region)
- Coordinates: 48°47′22″N 2°17′20″E
- Country: France
- Region: Île-de-France
- Department: Hauts-de-Seine
- Arrondissement: Antony
- Canton: Châtillon
- Intercommunality: Métropole du Grand Paris

Government
  - Mayor (2026–32): Pauline Le Fur
- Area^{1}: 2.51 km^{2} (0.97 sq mi)
- Highest elevation: 160 m (520 ft)
- Lowest elevation: 60 m (200 ft)
- Population (2023): 24,070
  - Density: 9,590/km^{2} (24,800/sq mi)
- Time zone: UTC+01:00 (CET)
  - Summer (DST): UTC+02:00 (CEST)
- INSEE/Postal code: 92032 /92260
- ^{1} French Land Register data, which excludes lakes, ponds, glaciers > 1 km^{2} (0.386 sq mi or 247 acres) and river estuaries.

Fontenay-aux-Roses (French pronunciation: [fɔ̃tnɛ o ʁoz]) is a commune in the southwestern suburbs of Paris, France. It is located 8.6 km (5.3 mi) from the center of Paris.

In 1880, a higher education institution for women, the École normale supérieure de Fontenay-aux-Roses, was founded with the primary goal of preparing women to become teachers. It became a mixed school in 1986, and was relocated to Lyon in 2000.

Fontenay is the location of the Commissariat à l'énergie atomique, and former location of the first French nuclear reactor, Zoé, and the first French tokamak fusion experiment, TFR.

== Name ==
The commune name originates from a local spring-fed stream (Latin fons, French fontaine) in the hillside descending from the Châtillon plateau, with "of roses" added to distinguish this commune from numerous French communes named Fontenay.

== History ==
The Hôtel de Ville was completed in 1860.

== Climate ==
The climate of Fontenay-aux-Roses is oceanic gradient. The observation stations used for the weather in Fontenay are at Orly and the airport of Velizy-Villacoublay, municipalities located not far from Fontenay. The climate is characterised by sunshine and fairly low rainfall. The average rainfall is about 650 mm per year, spread over 111 rainy days on average, including 16 days of heavy rainfall (10 mm). Temperatures are mild; the coldest month is January with an average temperature of 4.7 °C and the hottest months are July and August with a mean temperature of 20 °C.

Severe weather conditions are sometimes recorded:

- Maximum Temperature : 42.0 °C in 2003;
- Minimum Temperature : -16.0 °C in 1985;
- Maximum rain in 24 hours: 100 mm from 6 p.m. on 30th to 6 p.m. on August 5, 1997;
- High temperature days (> 25 °C) : 59.3;
- Rain days: 120.

Climate data for Fontenay-aux-Roses (1981–2010 normals, extremes 1981–2009)
Month	Jan	Feb	Mar	Apr	May	Jun	Jul	Aug	Sep	Oct	Nov	Dec	Year
Record high °C (°F)	16.5 (61.7)	20.0 (68.0)	25.0 (77.0)	31.0 (87.8)	32.0 (89.6)	36.5 (97.7)	37.5 (99.5)	40.0 (104.0)	34.0 (93.2)	29.0 (84.2)	21.0 (69.8)	16.5 (61.7)	40.0 (104.0)
Mean daily maximum °C (°F)	7.0 (44.6)	8.2 (46.8)	12.2 (54.0)	15.6 (60.1)	19.8 (67.6)	23.1 (73.6)	25.7 (78.3)	25.6 (78.1)	21.4 (70.5)	16.5 (61.7)	10.8 (51.4)	7.6 (45.7)	16.2 (61.2)
Daily mean °C (°F)	4.4 (39.9)	5.1 (41.2)	8.3 (46.9)	11.0 (51.8)	14.9 (58.8)	18.0 (64.4)	20.3 (68.5)	20.1 (68.2)	16.6 (61.9)	12.6 (54.7)	7.7 (45.9)	5.2 (41.4)	12.1 (53.8)
Mean daily minimum °C (°F)	1.8 (35.2)	2.1 (35.8)	4.4 (39.9)	6.4 (43.5)	10.1 (50.2)	12.9 (55.2)	14.9 (58.8)	14.7 (58.5)	11.9 (53.4)	8.7 (47.7)	4.7 (40.5)	2.6 (36.7)	8.0 (46.4)
Record low °C (°F)	−16.0 (3.2)	−11.0 (12.2)	−7.5 (18.5)	−2.0 (28.4)	1.5 (34.7)	5.0 (41.0)	6.5 (43.7)	6.0 (42.8)	5.0 (41.0)	−1.0 (30.2)	−7.0 (19.4)	−9.5 (14.9)	−16.0 (3.2)
Average precipitation mm (inches)	55.7 (2.19)	46.2 (1.82)	49.3 (1.94)	53.3 (2.10)	60.0 (2.36)	48.5 (1.91)	58.7 (2.31)	55.3 (2.18)	51.1 (2.01)	63.7 (2.51)	50.9 (2.00)	60.3 (2.37)	653.0 (25.71)
Average precipitation days (≥ 1.0 mm)	11.5	9.9	11.2	10.3	10.6	8.7	8.6	7.7	8.5	10.6	10.8	11.6	120.0
Source: Météo-France

== Transport ==
Fontenay-aux-Roses is served by Fontenay-aux-Roses station on Paris RER line B and Tram line 6 from Chatillon Montrouge metro to Viroflay. In addition, several bus lines 194, 294, 394, 390, 162, 195... cross the city to Paris and other suburban cities.

== Population ==
Historical population

Year	Pop.	±% p.a.
1793	942	—
1800	722	−3.73%
1806	877	+3.29%
1821	804	−0.58%
1831	1,021	+2.42%
1836	967	−1.08%
1841	1,092	+2.46%
1846	1,076	−0.29%
1851	1,176	+1.79%
1856	1,669	+7.25%
1861	2,157	+5.26%
1866	2,386	+2.04%
1872	2,362	−0.17%
1876	2,924	+5.48%
1881	2,849	−0.52%
1886	2,935	+0.60%
1891	2,652	−2.01%
1896	3,343	+4.74%
1901	3,402	+0.35%

Year	Pop.	±% p.a.
1906	4,082	+3.71%
1911	4,463	+1.80%
1921	5,202	+1.54%
1926	5,943	+2.70%
1931	6,870	+2.94%
1936	7,197	+0.93%
1946	7,455	+0.35%
1954	8,626	+1.84%
1962	20,237	+11.25%
1968	23,355	+2.42%
1975	25,596	+1.32%
1982	23,915	−0.97%
1990	23,322	−0.31%
1999	23,537	+0.10%
2007	24,066	+0.28%
2012	22,866	−1.02%
2017	24,564	+1.44%
2023	24,070	−0.34%

Source: EHESS and INSEE (1968–2023)

== Education ==
Primary schools in the commune:

- Six public preschools (maternelles): La Roue, Les Ormeaux, Les Pervenches, Les Renards, Jean Macé, Scarron
- Six public elementary schools: La Roue A, La Roue B, Le Parc, Les Ormeaux, Les Pervenches, Les Renards
- One private preschool and elementary school: Maternelle et Élémentaire St-Vincent de Paul

There is a public junior high school, Collège les Ormeaux.

Lycée professionnel privé Saint François d'Assise, a private vocational high school, is in the commune.

== Neighboring places ==
- Bagneux
- Châtillon
- Clamart
- Le Plessis-Robinson
- Sceaux

== Twin towns ==
- Borehamwood, United Kingdom since 1974
- Wiesloch, Germany since 1982

Links between Wiesloch and Fontenay-aux-Roses are very strong. Indeed, many school projects are organized each year.

== Personalities ==
- Paul Scarron (1610–1660) – writer, lived in Fontenay-aux-Roses.
- Theresa Cabarrus (1773–1835) – Known as "Madame Tallien" whose residence has become the École Normale Supérieure de Fontenay-aux-Roses.
- Aristide Boucicaut (1810–1877) – Founder of the Bon Marché and benefactor of the town, has long lived in Fontenay where he owned a large residence (known as the "castle Boucicaut and razed in 1954) it was also a member of the municipal council and was even elected mayor in 1871. However, he refused the post, and preferred to remain an alderman.
- Joris-Karl Huysmans (1848–1907) – Worked in Fontenay in July 1881 on his novel À Rebours; it is the setting for the aesthetic experiments of the decadent aristocrat des Esseintes.
- Ferdinand Lot (1866–1952) – medieval historian, lived in Fontenay-aux-Roses for a long time; he is buried in the family tomb.
- Pierre Bonnard (1867–1947) – Born in Fontenay at the corner of d'Estienne d'Orves Neyts and André, near the College des Ormeaux, painter.
- Paul Léautaud (1872–1956) – writer, lived in Fontenay (24, rue Guérard).
- Nikolai Semashko (1874–1949) – First People's Commissar for Health of the RSFSR and founder of the Soviet healthcare system lived in Fontenay (48, rue des Châtaigniers) before World War I.
- Thérèse Sclafert (1878–1959) – French alpine geographer and historian
- Jacques Déprats (1880–1935) – Born in Fontenay, geologist.
- Valery Larbaud (1881–1957) – writer, lived in Fontenay-aux-Roses.
- Mikhail Larionov (1881–1964) – Painter of the Russian avant-garde, died in Fontenay-aux-Roses.
- Alexandra Exter (1882–1949) – Artist of the Ukrainian & Russian avant-garde, died at Fontenay-aux-Roses.
- René Barthélemy (1889–1954) – French physicist, lived in Fontenay and is based on communal cemetery.
- René Letourneur (1898–1990) – Painter and sculptor, lived in Fontenay-aux-Roses.
- Boris Vildé (1908–1942) – Resistance fighter executed by the Germans, lived in Fontenay-aux-Roses.
- Yves Klein (1928–1962) – painter, lived in Fontenay-aux-Roses.
- Dieudonné (born 1966) – comedian, born in Fontenay.
- Laurent Aïello (born 1969) – Born in Fontenay, racing driver.
- Kamsoo Queen (born 1982) – model, comedian, lives in Fontenay-aux-Roses.
- Andrei Sinyavsky (1925–1997) – Russian writer, dissident, gulag survivor.
- Ilona Mitrecey (born 1993) – French singer, born in Fontenay-aux-Roses.

== See also ==
- Communes of the Hauts-de-Seine department
