= Éliane Basse =

French paleontologist

- Born: 21 May 1899; Paris, France
- Died: 28 January 1985 (aged 85); Clamart, France
- Other name: Éliane Basse de Ménorval
- Occupations: paleontologist and geologist
- Spouse: Hervé de la Goublaye de Ménorval (1896 - 1973)

Éliane Basse or Éliane Basse de Ménorval (21 May 1899 – 28 January 1985) was a French paleontologist and geologist who became research director at the French National Center for Scientific Research in 1960.

== Life ==
A student at the École normale supérieure in Sèvres for three years. She became professor-head of laboratory at the Lycée de Troyes and then was a doctoral fellow at the French National Museum of Natural History for two years.

She earned a doctorate in science and was named Scientific Director of research at the National Center for Scientific Research (often abbreviated CNRS) and associate professor of natural sciences.

Basse married fellow paleontologist Hervé de la Goublaye de Ménorval (1896 – 1973) on 11 June 1935 and assumed the name Éliane Basse de Ménorval.

=== Research ===
To research her doctoral thesis, Basse left for the island of Madagascar as project manager for the Museum of Natural History and was attached to the local mining service (1930–1932). She continued her research there in an area approximately bounded by Sikili, Mangoky River, and Ménamaty, which is the area where the town of Ankazoabo is located today in the southwestern part of the island. She traveled in these regions alone with Bara porters, a Malagasy surveyor and a Hetsiléo cook. After returning to Paris, she defended her thesis in 1935 about plant groups in southwestern Madagascar, earning her Ph.D.

She was named a Fellow of the National Science Fund (1932) and appointed lecturer at CNRS (1948) before becoming research director (1960).

Based in Paris, she collaborated on the geological map of Luxembourg and then that of France. She was also responsible for paleontological missions in the Central Atlas mountains of Tunisia (1952) and several other geological missions.

She became associate assistant to the geological map of France (1956), and in the 1960s held the post of director of the prehistoric antiquities in the district known as "Paris-Nord" (Paris North). Author Anick Coudart wrote, "As such, she was the first (and for nearly 20 years the only) woman in France entrusted with the administration of archaeological excavations".

=== Associations ===
She was made an honorary member of the Palaeontological Society of India in 1956.

Basse was elected a corresponding member of the fourth section of the Academy of Overseas Sciences on 7 December 1957, and became a full member on 17 May 1968.

== Death ==
Basse died in 1985 in Clamart, France. In her obituary, published in the Paris newspaper Le Figaro, 31 January 1985, she was remembered as the "Countesse de la Goublaye de Ménorval" a title she acquired with her marriage.

== Select publications ==
Basse authored more than a hundred scientific publications. Only five are listed here.

- General government of Madagascar and dependencies. Department of Mines. Paleontological monograph of the Cretaceous of the province of Maintirano, Madagascar. Antananarivo: Official printing house, 1931
- Theses presented to the Faculty of Sciences of Paris to obtain the degree of doctor of natural sciences. Plant groups of South-West Madagascar... Paris: Masson, 1934
- Macrocephalitides from southwestern Madagascar: macrocephalitidae, eucycloceratidae, mayaitidae. Crops from the É mission. Basse, 1930-31. Paris: [Sn], 1951 (co-author)
- Notes of the excursion. Quaternaire Année 1964 1-1 pp. 16–17, 1964.
- Fossils: evolution of the structures of living matter. Paris: University Press of France, 1968

== Eponymy ==
Gervillia elianae Cox, 1936, a Permian bivalve species known from Tanzania and Madagascar, was named in her honour. She had collected a part of the type material.
