= Montrouge =

- Commune
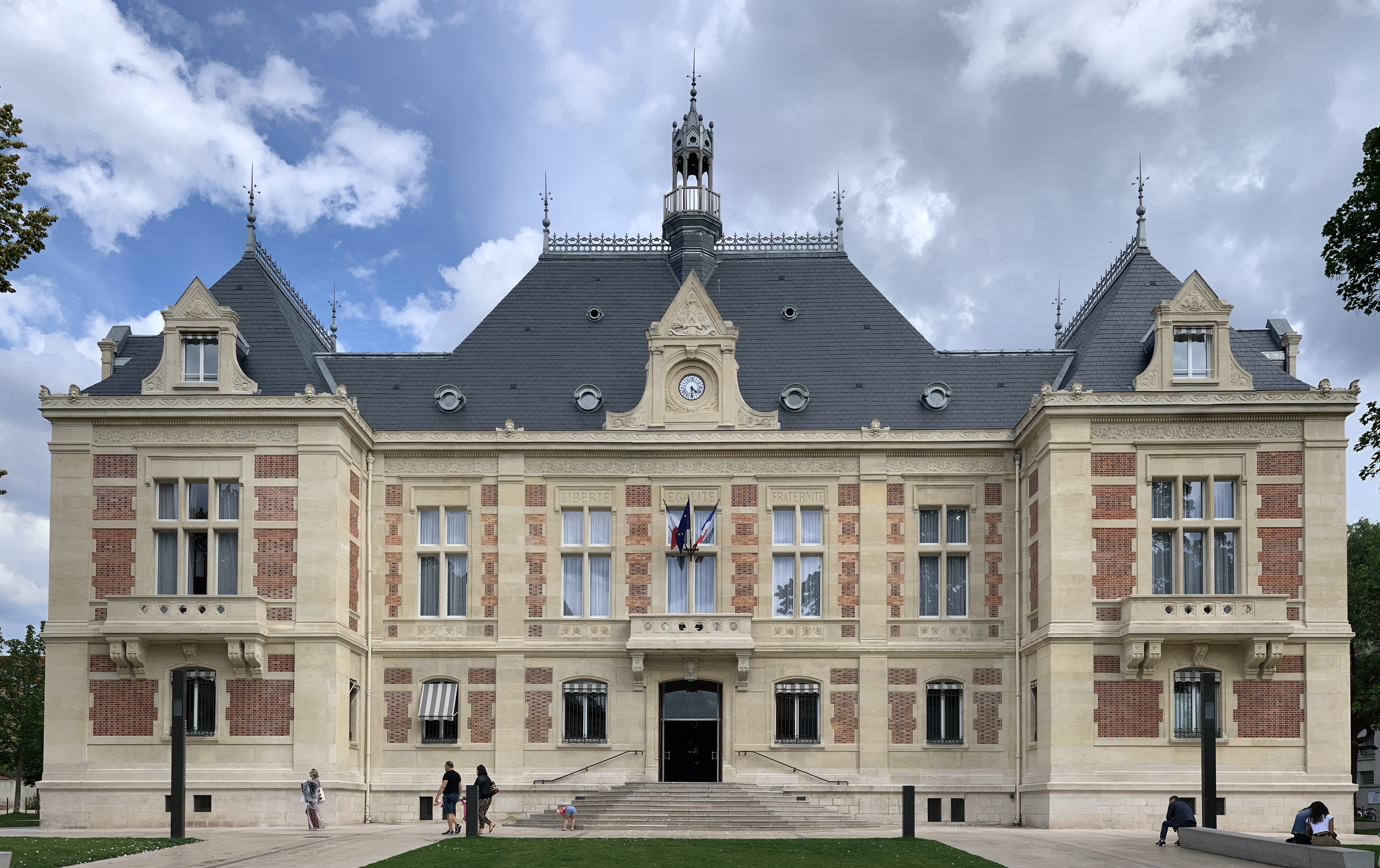
- The Hôtel de Ville

- Coat of arms

- Location (in red) within Paris inner suburbs
- Location of Montrouge
- Location within France Location within Île-de-France (region)
- Coordinates: 48°49′02″N 2°19′19″E
- Country: France
- Region: Île-de-France
- Department: Hauts-de-Seine
- Arrondissement: Antony
- Canton: Montrouge
- Intercommunality: Grand Paris

Government
  - Mayor (2026–32): Étienne Lengereau
- Area^{1}: 2.07 km^{2} (0.80 sq mi)
- Highest elevation: 85 m (279 ft)
- Lowest elevation: 67 m (220 ft)
- Population (2023): 46,324
  - Density: 22,400/km^{2} (58,000/sq mi)
- Demonym: Montrougiens
- Time zone: UTC+01:00 (CET)
  - Summer (DST): UTC+02:00 (CEST)
- INSEE/Postal code: 92049 /92120
- Website: www.ville-montrouge.fr
- ^{1} French Land Register data, which excludes lakes, ponds, glaciers > 1 km^{2} (0.386 sq mi or 247 acres) and river estuaries.

Montrouge (French pronunciation: [mɔ̃ʁuʒ]) is a suburban commune just south of Paris, France. It is in Hauts-de-Seine on the border with Val-de-Marne, 4.4 km (2.7 mi) from the centre of Paris. It is one of the most densely populated municipalities in Europe; after a long period of decline, the population has increased again in recent years. It is a relatively wealthy commune.

== History ==
The name "Montrouge" means Red Mountain – from mont (mountain) and rouge (red) – because of the reddish colour of the earth in this area.

The name of the community was first mentioned in monastery documents in 1194.

Throughout the Middle Ages, the hamlet was home to monasteries and a number of religious orders, while in the 15th century it became the site of quarries used for the reconstruction of Paris. The late sixteenth century saw the plain of Montrouge named "reserve for royal hunts", and during the seventeenth and eighteenth centuries it was known for its windmills, which have all now disappeared.

On 1 January 1860, the city of Paris was enlarged by annexing neighbouring communes. On that occasion, most of the commune of Montrouge was annexed to Paris, forming what is now called Petit-Montrouge, in the 14th arrondissement of Paris. The remainder of Montrouge was preserved as an independent town.

In 1875, the town gained a few thousand square metres from the neighbouring communes of Châtillon and Bagneux (principally in the neighbourhood (le quartier) called Haut Mesnil). The Hôtel de Ville was completed in 1883.

On 8 January 2015, Municipal Police officer Clarissa Jean-Philippe was shot and killed in the commune, purportedly by Amedy Coulibaly. Coulibaly was reported to be an accomplice of Saïd and Chérif Kouachi, the suspected perpetrators of the Charlie Hebdo shooting. The next day, he was gunned down by police during a siege that left four hostages dead and several other people injured.

== Population ==
Historical population

Year	Pop.	±% p.a.
1793	869	—
1800	810	−1.00%
1806	1,128	+5.67%
1821	1,464	+1.75%
1831	3,847	+10.14%
1836	5,995	+9.28%
1841	7,125	+3.51%
1846	7,813	+1.86%
1851	9,223	+3.37%
1856	9,910	+1.45%
1861	3,534	−18.63%
1866	4,809	+6.35%
1872	4,377	−1.56%
1876	6,371	+9.84%
1881	8,595	+6.17%
1886	10,334	+3.75%
1891	11,992	+3.02%
1896	14,317	+3.61%
1901	17,298	+3.86%

Year	Pop.	±% p.a.
1906	19,261	+2.17%
1911	22,771	+3.40%
1921	25,813	+1.26%
1926	26,310	+0.38%
1931	30,343	+2.89%
1936	33,260	+1.85%
1946	34,735	+0.43%
1954	36,298	+0.55%
1962	45,260	+2.80%
1968	44,922	−0.12%
1975	40,304	−1.54%
1982	38,517	−0.65%
1990	38,106	−0.13%
1999	37,733	−0.11%
2007	46,500	+2.65%
2012	48,909	+1.02%
2017	50,260	+0.55%
2023	46,324	−1.35%

Source: EHESS and INSEE (1968–2023)

== Economy ==
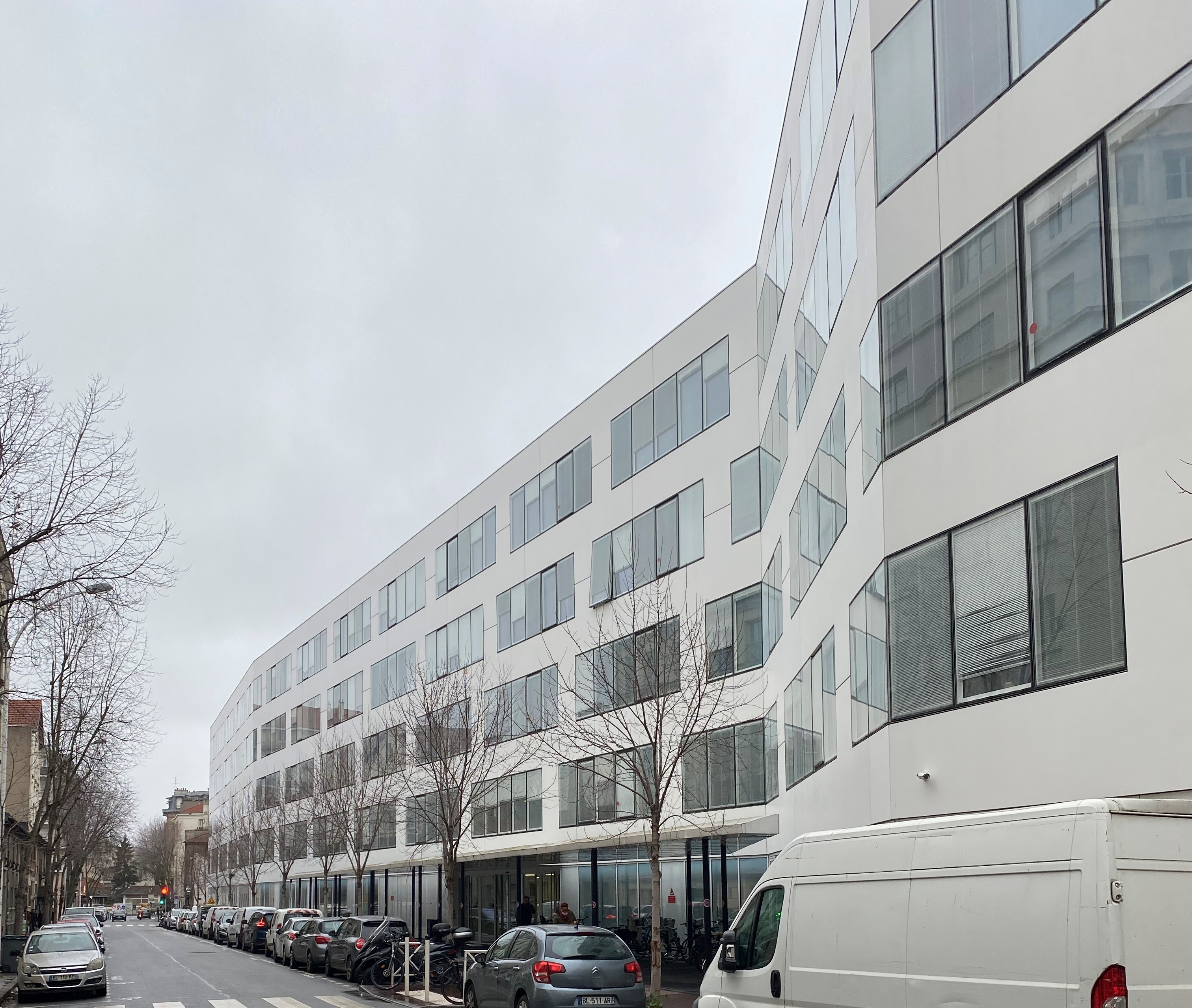
Head office of French statistical agency INSEE at 88, avenue Verdier in Montrouge

Industrial development started in 1925 and soon, many printing factories were to be found in the town. Most of these have disappeared today. Since the early years of the twenty-first century, professional services and telecommunications have been the main business activities.

- Aeronautical and electronic engineering, Alstom, Schlumberger, Siemens AG, ST Microelectronics
- Banking, Credit Agricole Corporate and Investment Bank
- Telecommunications, Orange
- The Papier d'Arménie (lit. Armenian Paper)

== Public transport ==
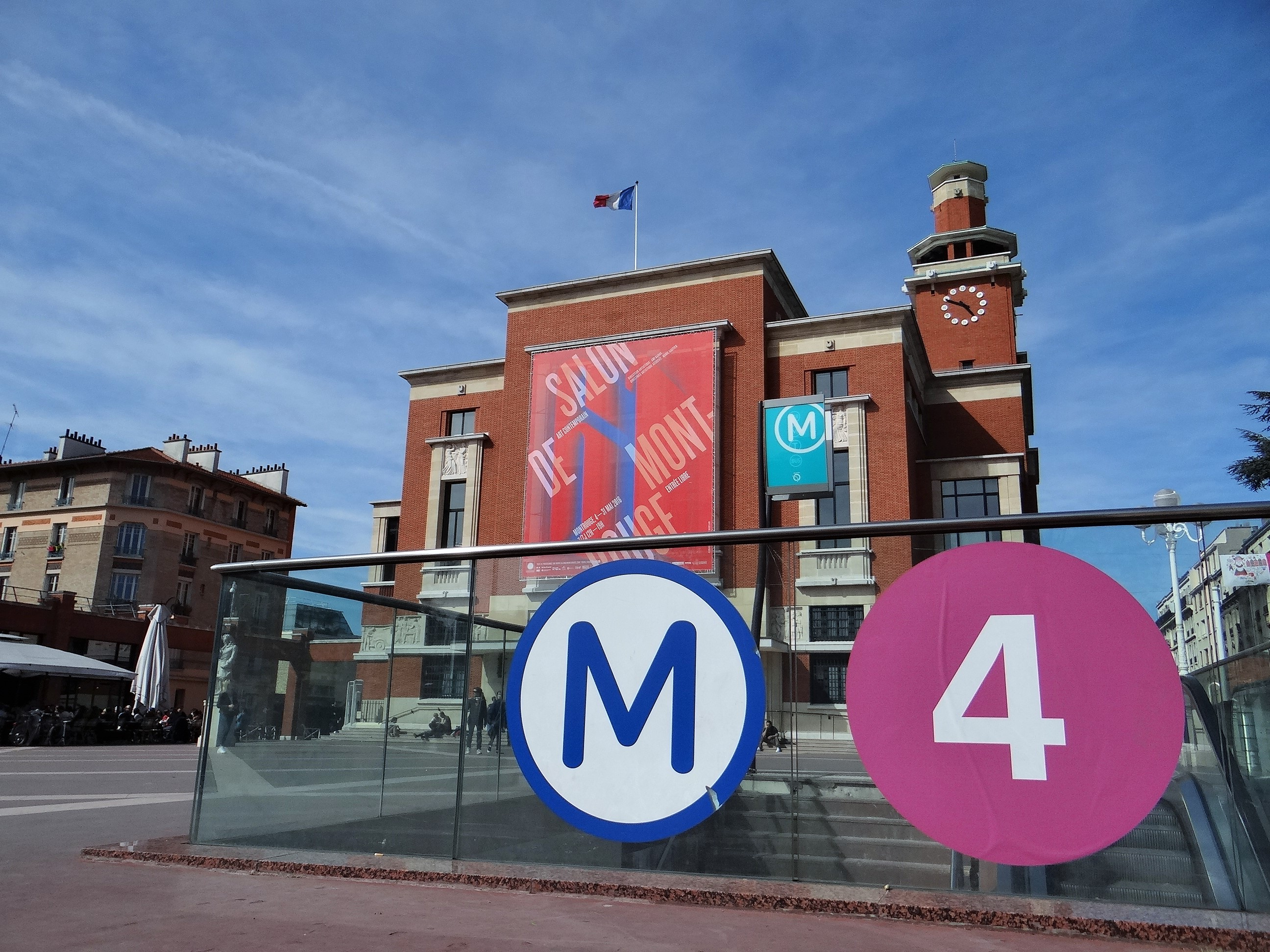
Mairie de Montrouge Metro Station

Montrouge is served by Mairie de Montrouge and Barbara stations on Paris Métro Line 4, and by Châtillon – Montrouge station on Paris Métro Line 13.

The Châtillon - Montrouge station is located at the border between the commune of Montrouge and the commune of Châtillon, on the Châtillon side of the border. The Barbara station is located at the border between the commune of Montrouge and the commune of Bagneux. The Mairie de Montrouge station opened in March 2013, with the further extension of Line 4 opening to Bagneux–Lucie Aubrac in January 2022.

Bus line 68 runs from Metro Châtillon Montrouge all the way up through Montparnasse, the Louvre, the Paris Opera and ends at the Place de Clichy, the site of the Moulin Rouge. Bus line 126 runs from Porte d'Orléans to Boulogne-Billancourt, while line 128 goes from the same place to Robinson RER station. Bus line 323 runs on the southern border of Montrouge on its way between Issy-les-Moulineaux and Ivry-sur-Seine. Several lines (187, 188, 197, 297) use the Route nationale 20 that crosses eastern Montrouge to reach southern parts of the Parisian agglomeration.

== The arts in Montrouge ==
Montrouge was the home of a number of well-known twentieth century artists, listed below. Currently the town is also well known for two contemporary art exhibitions:

- The Montrouge Contemporary Art Show, which has existed for over 50 years
- The JCE, that is European Young Artists exhibition.

== Education ==
Montrouge has seven public primary schools: Aristide Briand, Buffalo, François Rabelais, Nicolas Boileau, Raymond Queneau, Renaudel A, and Renaudel B.

Public junior high schools: Haut Mesnil, Maurice Genevoix, Robert Doisneau.

Public high schools: Lycée Jean Monnet (Montrouge), Lycée Jean Monnet, Lycée Maurice Genevoix.

There is a private secondary school, Groupe Scolaire Jeanne d'Arc.

== Notable people ==
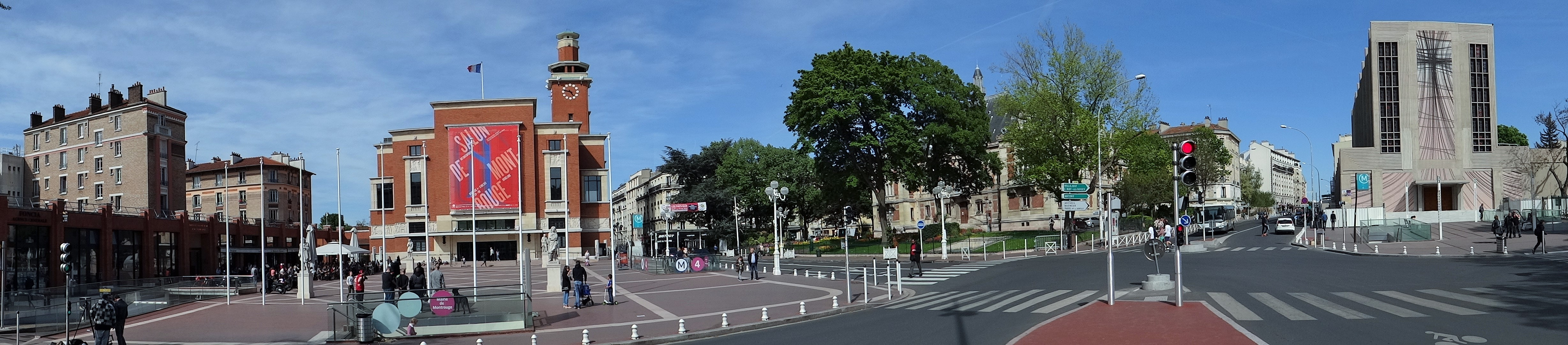
Émile Cresp Place, Belfry, Hôtel de Ville and St Jacques church.

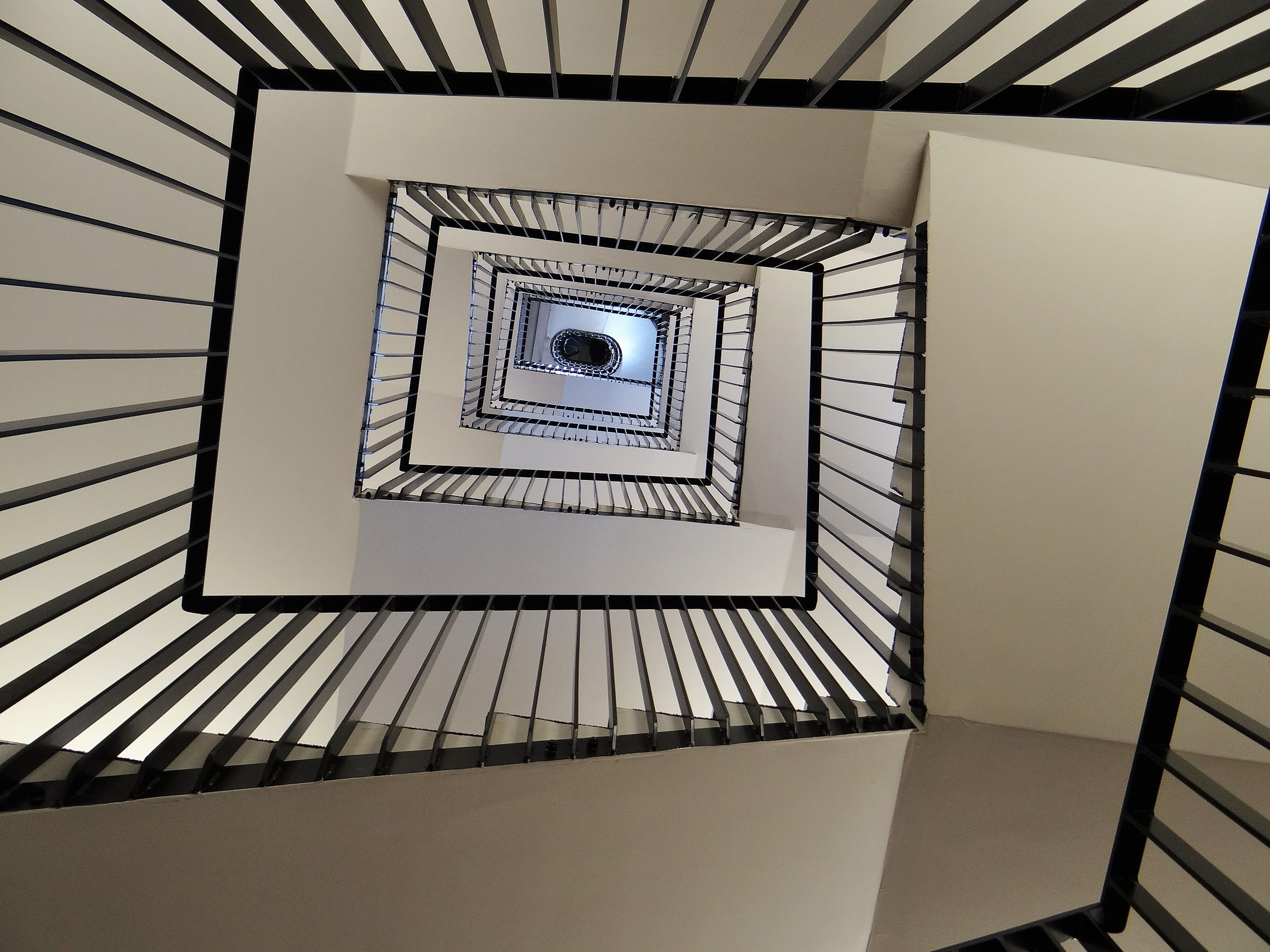
Inside the Belfry Montrouge, France

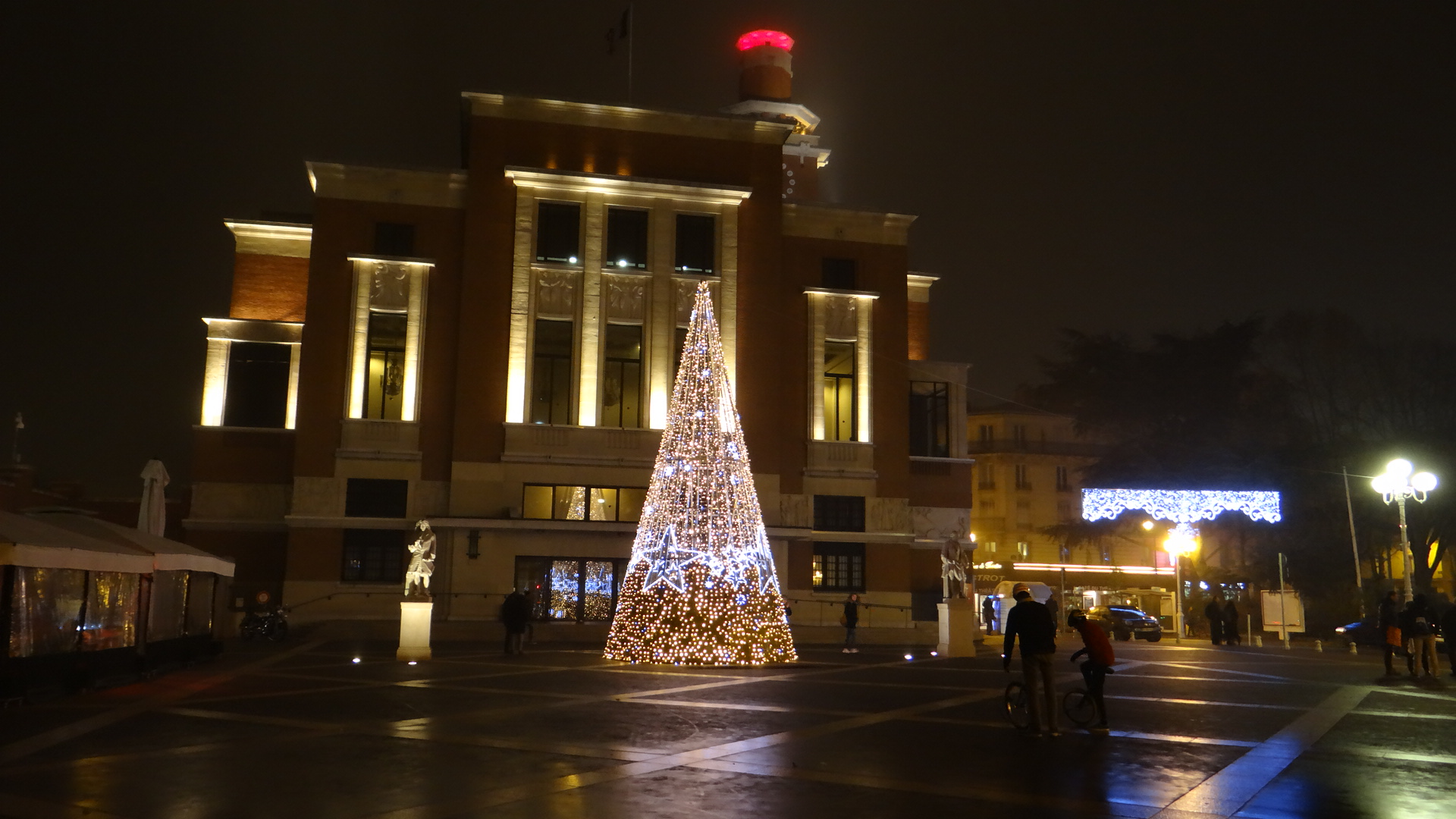
Emile Cresp Place, Christmas 2016

- Émile Boutroux (1845–1921), philosopher and member of the Académie française
- Robert Brasillach (1909–1945) French author and journalist.
- Émile Chatelain (1851–1933), Latinist and palaeographer
- Coluche (b. 1944 in Paris – 1986) (Michel Collucci), comedian and sometime political figure, founder of the "Restos du cœur" soup kitchens.
- Robert Doisneau (1912–1994), photographer, born in Gentilly, lived in Montrouge from 1937 until his death.
- Raymond Federman (1928–2009) American novelist and academic.
- Jean-Jacques Goldman (b. 1951), lyricist and singer, he has lived most of his life in Montrouge, but now resides in Marseille.
- William Grover-Williams (1903–1945), racing driver and Special Operations Executive agent.
- Octave Lapize (1887–1917), winner of the 1910 Tour de France
- Fernand Léger (1881–1955) lived in Montrouge and ran a painting school there.
- Pablo Picasso (1881–1973), the cubist, had his workshop in Montrouge from 1916 to 1918.
- Bernard Pivot (b. 1935), journalist and television personality. Born in Lyon, Pivot has lived in Montrouge since 2003.
- Claude Sautet (1924–2000), director and screenwriter.
- Nicolas de Staël (1914–55) is buried in Montrouge Cemetery.

=== Personalities associated with the commune ===
- Amaury-Duval (1808–1885) a pupil of Ingres including Portrait d'Isaure Chassériau in 1838
- Harry Baur, Montrouge 1880 – Paris 1943, actor
- Edouard Boubat, (1923–30 June 1999 in Montrouge), photographer
- Alexandre Boutique (1851–1923), novelist
- Émile Boutroux (1845–1921), philosopher and member of the Académie française.
- Gérard Brach (23 July 1927 in Montrouge – 9 September 2006 in Paris), screenwriter
- Jean-Roger Caussimon 24 July 1918 in Montrouge – 20 October 1985 in Paris, actor, poet and libertarian songwriter
- Zoé Clauzure, 2023 Junior Eurovision Lives in Montrouge
- Pierre Collet (1914 Montrouge, 1977 in Paris), actor
- Pierre Colombier, film director, died 25 January 1958
- Michel Colucci (Coluche) (1944–1986), humorist. Born in Paris, spent his youth in the city
- Jean-Claude Deret (1921–2016), né Breitman, author, screenwriter, actor, director
- Robert Doisneau (1912–1994), photographer. Born in Gentilly, settled in Montrouge in 1937
- Jacques Dynam (30 December 1923 in Montrouge – 11 November 2004 in Paris), real name Jacques Barbé, actor
- Raymond Federman (1928–2009), American writer, born in Montrouge
- Carole Gaessler, journalist for France 2 and France 5
- Théophile Gautier is supposed to have lived on avenue Verdier
- Jean Giraud (Moebius) (1938–2012), comic artist and scenarist
- Jean-Jacques Goldman, (born 1951), songwriter and singer. Born in Paris, lives now in Marseille.
- Piotr Kowalski (1927–2004)
- Octave Lapize (1887–1917), cyclist
- Virginie Ledoyen, actress living in Montrouge since 2003
- René Metge, born 23 October 1941 in Montrouge
- Ariane Mnouchkine, theatre director, lives in Montrouge.
- Pablo Picasso (1881–1973), lived at 22 rue Victor Hugo in 1916
- Jules Pillevesse (1837–1903), composer and conductor died in the commune
- Bernard Pivot (born 1935), journalist. Born in Lyon, lived in the city from 2003 to 2007.
- Raoul Pugno (1852–1914), born in Montrouge, composer and pianist
- Atiq Rahimi, prix Goncourt 2008, lives in Montrouge
- François Roy, actor and film score composer
- Claude Sautet (1924–2000), screenwriter and film director born in Montrouge
- Évelyne Sullerot (1924–2017), famous for her feminist militantism
- Valentine Tessier (1892–1981), actress, spent her youth in Montrouge

== Others ==
- Fort de Montrouge, one of the 16 forts built around Paris in the 1840s, located mainly in the commune of Arcueil
- Montrouge celebrates Fête nationale with fireworks and ball each year.

== See also ==
- Communes of the Hauts-de-Seine department
