= Canton of Neuilly-sur-Seine =

Administrative division of Hauts-de-Seine, France

Coordinates: 48.89°N 2.27°E

The canton of Neuilly-sur-Seine is an administrative division of the Hauts-de-Seine department, in northern France. It was created at the French canton reorganisation which came into effect in March 2015. Its seat is in Neuilly-sur-Seine.

It consists of the following communes:

1. Neuilly-sur-Seine
