= Canton of Issy-les-Moulineaux =

Administrative division of Hauts-de-Seine, France

Coordinates: 48.82°N 2.27°E

The canton of Issy-les-Moulineaux is an administrative division of the Hauts-de-Seine department, in northern France. It was created at the French canton reorganisation which came into effect in March 2015. Its seat is in Issy-les-Moulineaux.

It consists of the following communes:

1. Issy-les-Moulineaux
