= Canton of Antony =

Administrative division of Hauts-de-Seine, France

Coordinates: 48.75°N 2.30°E

The canton of Antony is an administrative division of the Hauts-de-Seine department, in northern France. Its borders were modified at the French canton reorganisation which came into effect in March 2015. Its seat is in Antony.

It consists of the following communes:

1. Antony
