= Communes of the Hauts-de-Seine department =

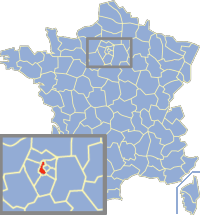

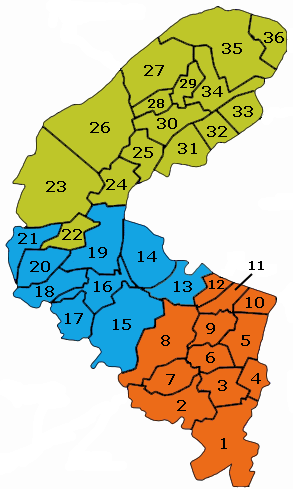

The following is a list of the 36 communes of the Hauts-de-Seine department of France.

Since 1 January 2016, all communes of Hauts-de-Seine have been part of the Métropole du Grand Paris.

== List ==
INSEE code	Postal code	Commune
92002	92160	Antony
92004	92600	Asnières-sur-Seine
92007	92220	Bagneux
92009	92270	Bois-Colombes
92012	92100	Boulogne-Billancourt
92014	92340	Bourg-la-Reine
92019	92290	Châtenay-Malabry
92020	92320	Châtillon
92022	92370	Chaville
92023	92140	Clamart
92024	92110	Clichy
92025	92700	Colombes
92026	92400	Courbevoie
92032	92260	Fontenay-aux-Roses
92033	92380	Garches
92035	92250	La Garenne-Colombes
92036	92230	Gennevilliers
92040	92130	Issy-les-Moulineaux
92044	92300	Levallois-Perret
92046	92240	Malakoff
92047	92430	Marnes-la-Coquette
92048	92190	Meudon
92049	92120	Montrouge
92050	92000	Nanterre
92051	92200	Neuilly-sur-Seine
92060	92350	Le Plessis-Robinson
92062	92800	Puteaux
92063	92500	Rueil-Malmaison
92064	92210	Saint-Cloud
92071	92330	Sceaux
92072	92310	Sèvres
92073	92150	Suresnes
92075	92170	Vanves
92076	92420	Vaucresson
92077	92410	Ville-d'Avray
92078	92390	Villeneuve-la-Garenne
