= Hauts-de-Seine =

Department of France in Île-de-France

- Department of France
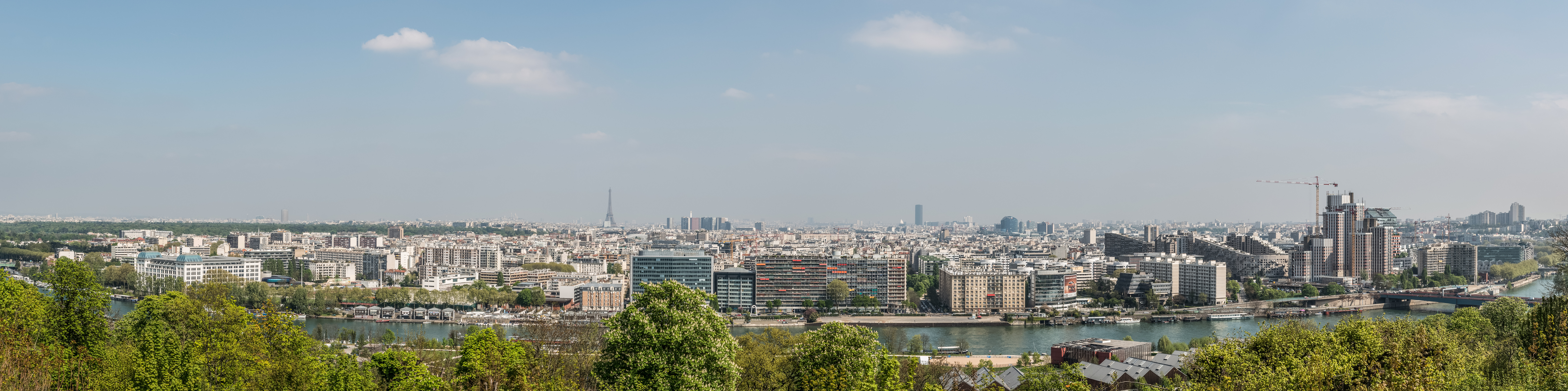
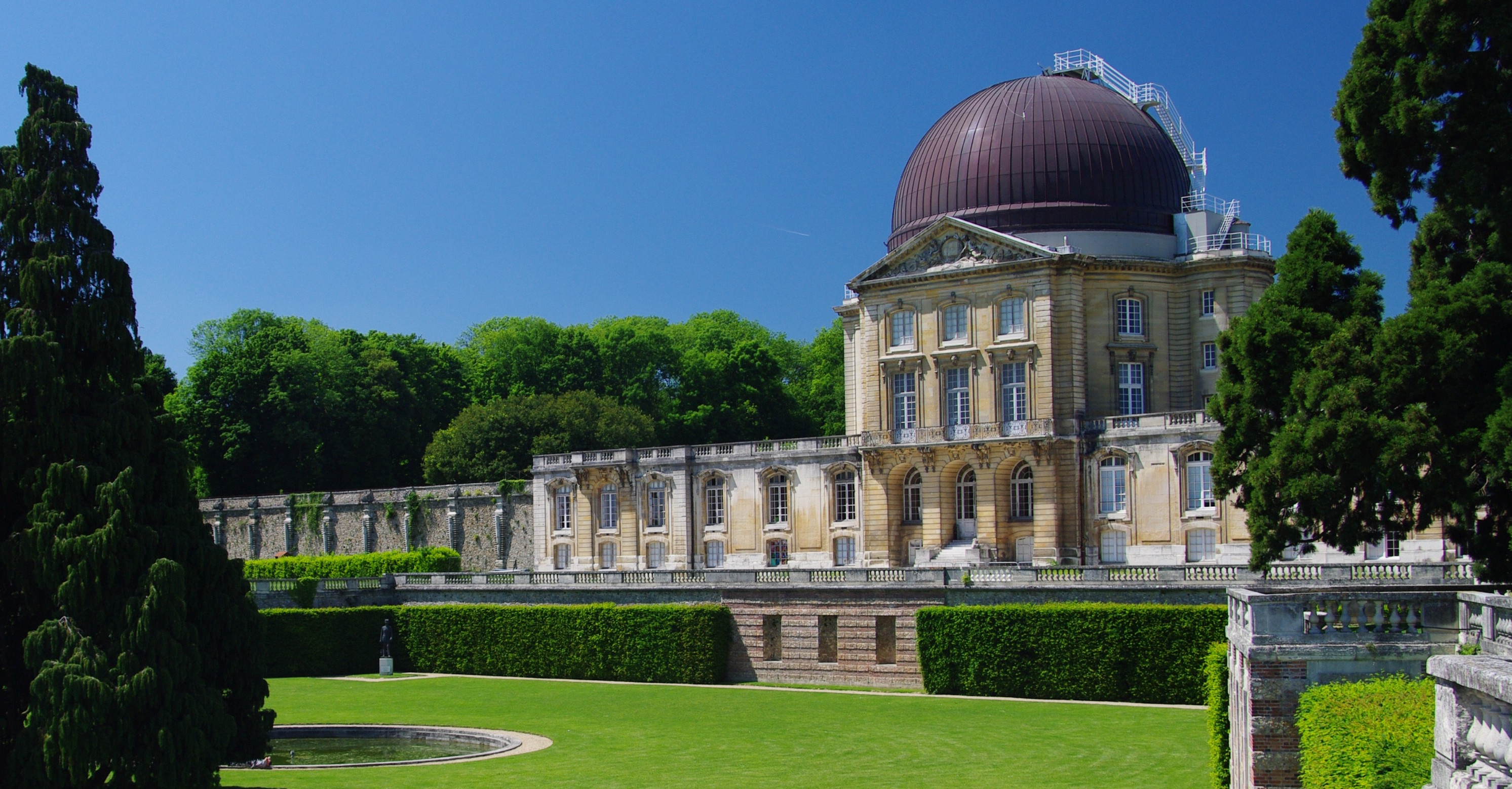
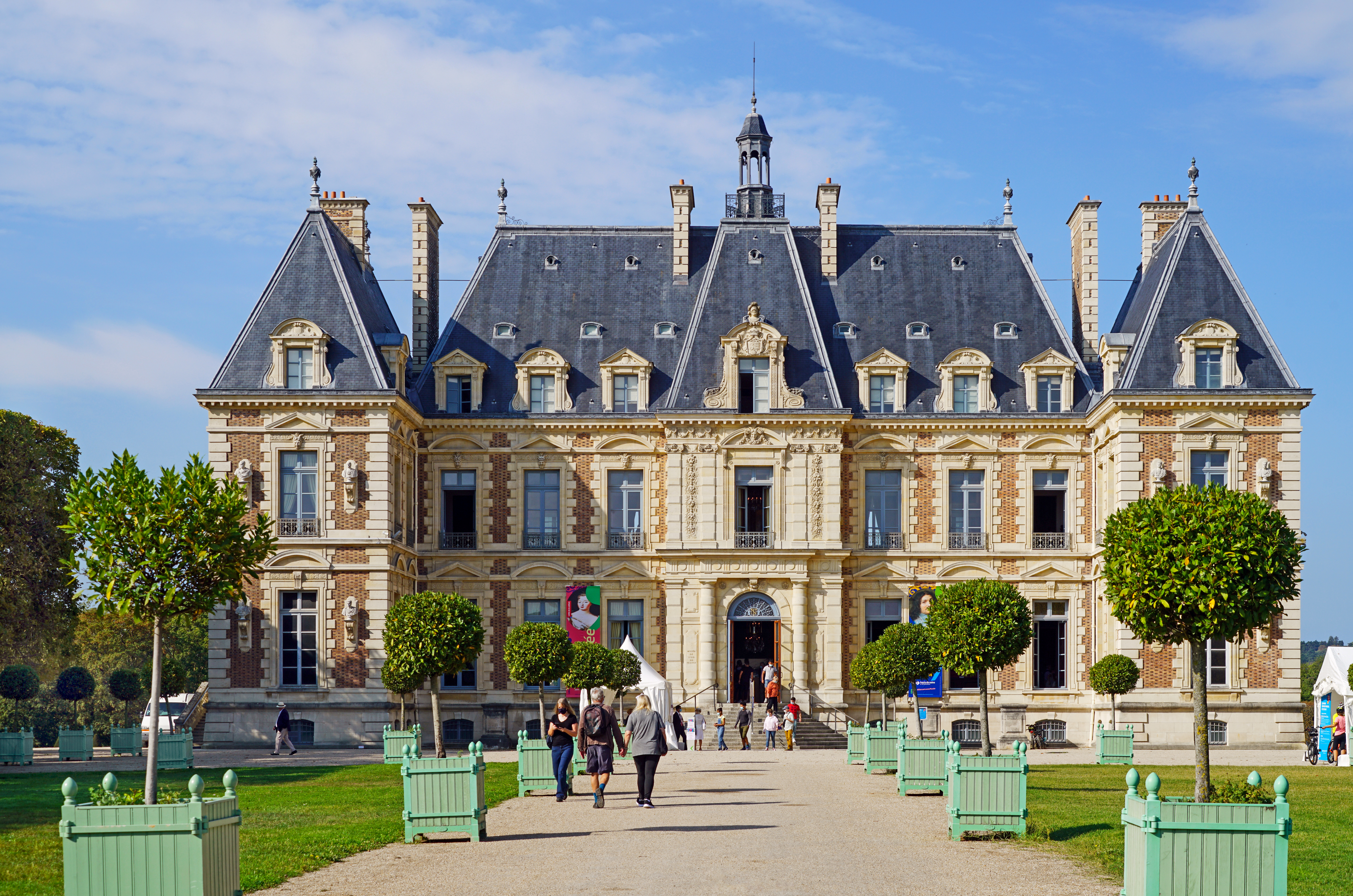
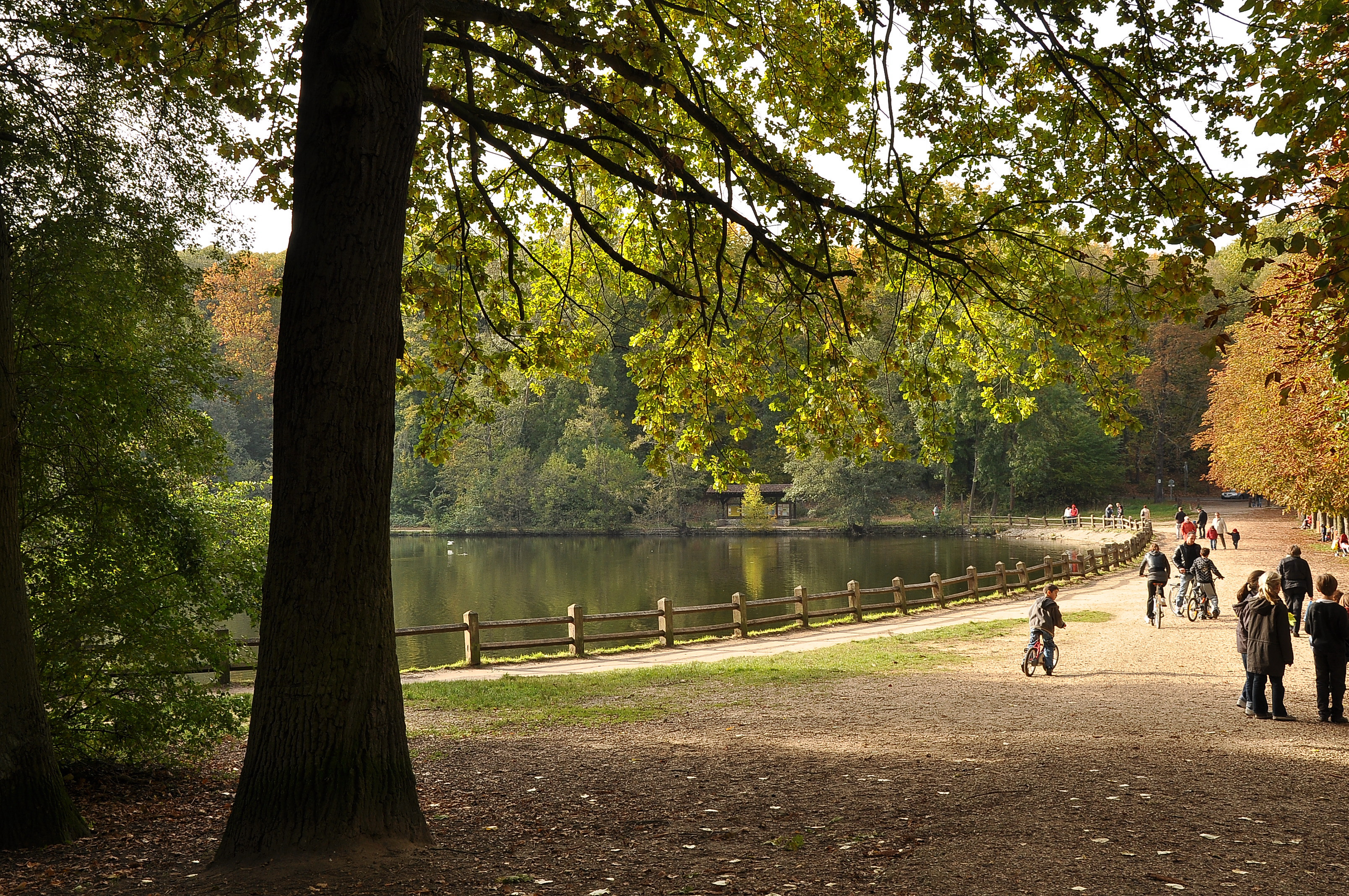
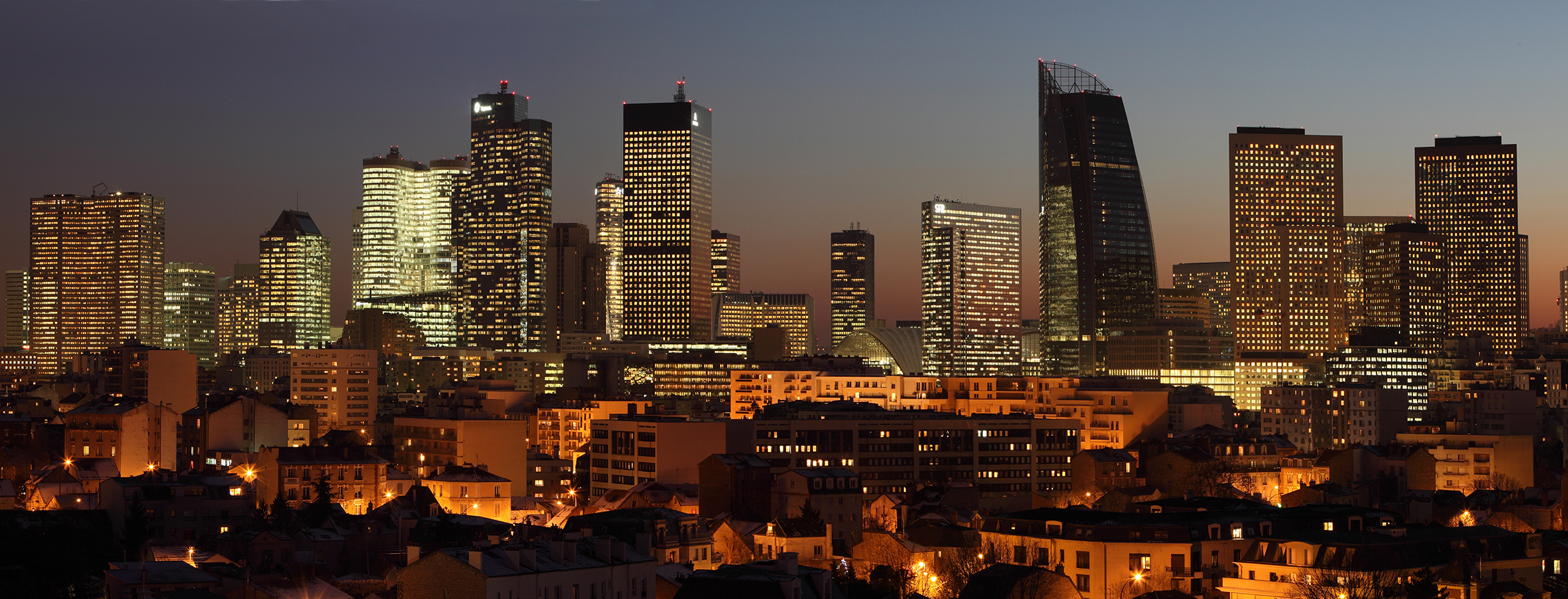
- From top down, left to right: a view of Boulogne-Billancourt from the Parc de Saint-Cloud, Meudon site of the Paris Observatory, the Château de Sceaux, lake in Rueil-Malmaison, La Défense seen from La Garenne-Colombes

- Flag Coat of arms

- Location of Hauts-de-Seine in France
- Coordinates: 48°50′N 02°12′E
- Country: France
- Region: Île-de-France
- Prefecture: Nanterre
- Subprefectures: Antony; Boulogne- Billancourt

Government
  - President of the Departmental Council: Georges Siffredi (LR)

Area^{1}
  - Total: 176 km^{2} (68 sq mi)

Population (2023)
  - Total: 1,654,712
  - Rank: 7th
  - Density: 9,400/km^{2} (24,400/sq mi)
- Demonym(s): Altoséquanais; Altoséquanaise

GDP
  - Total: €188.333 billion (2021)
  - Per capita: €115,168 (2021)
- Time zone: UTC+1 (CET)
  - Summer (DST): UTC+2 (CEST)
- ISO 3166 code: FR-92
- Department number: 92
- Arrondissements: 3
- Cantons: 23
- Communes: 36
- ^1 French Land Register data, which exclude estuaries and lakes, ponds and glaciers larger than 1 km^{2}

Hauts-de-Seine (French pronunciation: [o d(ə) sɛn]; lit. 'Seine Heights') is a department in the Île-de-France region of France. It covers Paris's western inner suburbs.

It is bordered by Paris, Seine-Saint-Denis and Val-de-Marne to the east, Val-d'Oise to the north, Yvelines to the west and Essonne to the south. With a population of 1,654,712 (as of 2023) and a total area of 176 square kilometres (68 square miles), it has the second highest population density among all departments of France, after Paris. It is the seventh most populous department in France. Its prefecture is Nanterre, although Boulogne-Billancourt, one of its two subprefectures, alongside Antony, has a larger population.

Hauts-de-Seine is best known for containing the modern business centre of La Défense, one of Grand Paris's main economic centres and one of Europe's major business districts. Hauts-de-Seine is one of the wealthiest departments in France. It had the highest GDP per capita in France at €107,800 in 2020. Several of its communes, including Neuilly-sur-Seine, Saint-Cloud, Garches and Ville-d'Avray, are wealthy suburbs of Paris.

Its inhabitants are called Altoséquanais (masculine) and Altoséquanaises (feminine) in French.

== History ==
From 1790 to 1968, Hauts-de-Seine was part of the former department of Seine.

The Hauts-de-Seine department was created in 1968, from parts of the former departments of Seine and Seine-et-Oise. Its creation reflected the implementation of a law passed in 1964. Nanterre had already been selected as the prefecture for the new department early in 1965.

In 2016, the Departmental Council of Hauts-de-Seine voted in favour of a fusion of Hauts-de-Seine and Yvelines, its western neighbour. Following a similar vote in Yvelines, an établissement public interdépartemental was established. The fusion project was abandoned in 2021, but the cooperation between the two departments continues.

== Demographics ==
=== Population development since 1881 ===
Historical population

Year	Pop.	±% p.a.
1881	254,928	—
1891	332,076	+2.68%
1901	467,391	+3.48%
1911	614,862	+2.78%
1921	724,261	+1.65%
1931	949,231	+2.74%
1936	1,019,627	+1.44%
1946	992,859	−0.27%
1954	1,118,020	+1.50%
1962	1,381,805	+2.68%

Year	Pop.	±% p.a.
1968	1,461,619	+0.94%
1975	1,438,930	−0.22%
1982	1,387,039	−0.52%
1990	1,391,658	+0.04%
1999	1,428,881	+0.29%
2007	1,544,411	+0.98%
2012	1,586,434	+0.54%
2017	1,609,306	+0.29%
2023	1,654,712	+0.46%

=== Place of birth of residents ===
Place of birth of residents of Hauts-de-Seine in 1999
Born in metropolitan France	Born outside metropolitan France			
80.6%	19.4%			
80.6%	Born in overseas France	Born in foreign countries with French citizenship at birth^{1}	EU-15 immigrants^{2}	Non-EU-15 immigrants
80.6%	1.5%	3.5%	3.8%	10.6%
^{1} This group is made up largely of former French settlers, such as pieds-noirs in Northwest Africa, followed by former colonial citizens who had French citizenship at birth (such as was often the case for the native elite in French colonies), as well as to a lesser extent foreign-born children of French expatriates. A foreign country is understood as a country not part of France in 1999, so a person born for example in 1950 in Algeria, when Algeria was an integral part of France, is nonetheless listed as a person born in a foreign country in French statistics.^{2} An immigrant is a person born in a foreign country not having French citizenship at birth. An immigrant may have acquired French citizenship since moving to France, but is still considered an immigrant in French statistics. On the other hand, persons born in France with foreign citizenship (the children of immigrants) are not listed as immigrants.

== Geography ==
=== Location ===
Hauts-de-Seine and two other small departments (Seine-Saint-Denis and Val-de-Marne) form an inner ring around Paris, known as the Petite Couronne (literal translation: "Little Crown"). Together with the City of Paris, they are included in Greater Paris since 1 January 2016. It is the smallest department in France, followed by Seine-Saint-Denis and Val-de-Marne.

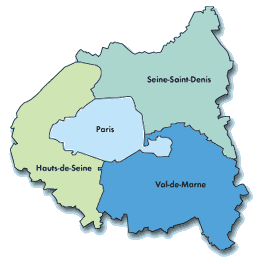

=== Administration ===
Hauts-de-Seine comprises three departmental arrondissements and 36 communes:

Map number	Name	Area (km^{2})	Population (2023)	Coat of arms	Arrondissement	Map	Labelled map
1	Antony	9.56	64,263		Antony		
2	Châtenay-Malabry	6.38	35,825		Antony		
3	Sceaux	3.6	20,884		Antony		
4	Bourg-la-Reine	1.86	21,019		Antony		
5	Bagneux	4.19	44,572		Antony		
6	Fontenay-aux-Roses	2.51	24,070		Antony		
7	Le Plessis-Robinson	3.43	28,848		Antony		
8	Clamart	8.77	58,576		Antony		
9	Châtillon	2.92	36,705		Antony		
10	Montrouge	2.07	46,324		Antony		
11	Malakoff	2.07	30,557		Antony		
12	Vanves	1.56	28,622		Boulogne-Billancourt		
13	Issy-les-Moulineaux	4.25	67,669		Boulogne-Billancourt		
14	Boulogne-Billancourt	6.17	119,019		Boulogne-Billancourt		
15	Meudon	9.9	46,334		Boulogne-Billancourt		
16	Sèvres	3.91	22,303		Boulogne-Billancourt		
17	Chaville	3.55	20,594		Boulogne-Billancourt		
18	Ville-d'Avray	3.67	11,089		Boulogne-Billancourt		
20	Marnes-la-Coquette	3.48	1,752		Boulogne-Billancourt		
19	Saint-Cloud	7.56	29,855		Nanterre		
21	Vaucresson	3.08	8,432		Nanterre		
22	Garches	2.69	17,743		Nanterre		
23	Rueil-Malmaison	14.7	82,874		Nanterre		
24	Suresnes	3.79	48,956		Nanterre		
25	Puteaux	3.19	44,002		Nanterre		
26	Nanterre	12.19	97,783		Nanterre		
27	Colombes	7.81	91,053		Nanterre		
28	La Garenne-Colombes	1.78	30,197		Nanterre		
29	Bois-Colombes	1.92	28,909		Nanterre		
30	Courbevoie	4.17	82,902		Nanterre		
31	Neuilly-sur-Seine	3.73	59,538		Nanterre		
32	Levallois-Perret	2.41	68,092		Nanterre		
33	Clichy	3.08	64,410		Nanterre		
34	Asnières-sur-Seine	4.82	93,941		Nanterre		
35	Gennevilliers	11.64	50,979		Nanterre		
36	Villeneuve-la-Garenne	3.2	26,021		Nanterre		

Hauts-de-Seine currently has the fewest number of communes (36) of any department in Metropolitan France, not including Paris which has only one commune.

== Economy ==
Hauts-de-Seine is one of France's wealthiest departments and one of Europe's richest areas. Its GDP per capita was €106,800 in 2020, according to Eurostat official figures.

== Politics ==
In both local and national elections, the department predominantly supports centre-right political candidates, though the 1st and 11th constituencies favor the left.

Hauts-de-Seine was the political base of Nicolas Sarkozy, President of the French Republic from 2007 to 2012. He was the mayor of Neuilly-sur-Seine (1983–2002) and president of the Departmental Council of Hauts-de-Seine (2004–2007) before he assumed the office. Sarkozy had succeeded Charles Pasqua as president of the Departmental Council.

In the 1990s and early 2000s, Hauts-de-Seine received national media attention as the result of a corruption scandal concerning the misuse of public funds provided for the department's housing projects. Implicated were Charles Pasqua, as well as other personalities of the Rally for the Republic (RPR) party.

=== Departmental Council of Hauts-de-Seine ===
Hauts-de-Seine is governed by a departmental council. Its 46 members are called departmental councillors. The electorate of Hauts-de-Seine usually votes for right-wing parties; there has never been a left-wing majority since the department's inception in 1968.

The departmental council is the deliberative organ of the department. The executive is led by the council president, assisted by vice presidents, in charge of various portfolios. Departmental councillors are elected (two per canton) by the department's inhabitants for six-year terms (no term limits). The president of the Departmental Council is Georges Siffredi, elected in 2020.

=== Presidential elections (2nd round) results since 1995 ===
Election	Winning candidate	Party	%	2nd place candidate	Party	%
2022	Emmanuel Macron	LREM	80.39	Marine Le Pen	FN	19.61
2017	Emmanuel Macron	LREM	85.65	Marine Le Pen	FN	14.35
2012	Nicolas Sarkozy	UMP	50.52	François Hollande	PS	49.48
2007	Nicolas Sarkozy	UMP	55.65	Ségolène Royal	PS	44.35
2002	Jacques Chirac	RPR	87.99	Jean-Marie Le Pen	FN	12.01
1995	Jacques Chirac	RPR	57.25	Lionel Jospin	PS	42.75

=== National representation ===
==== In the National Assembly ====
Hauts-de-Seine elected the following members of the National Assembly in the 2024 legislative election:

Constituency	Member	Party
Hauts-de-Seine's 1st constituency	Elsa Faucillon	French Communist Party
Hauts-de-Seine's 2nd constituency	Thomas Lam	The Republicans
Hauts-de-Seine's 3rd constituency	Philippe Juvin	The Republicans
Hauts-de-Seine's 4th constituency	Sabrina Sebaihi	The Ecologists
Hauts-de-Seine's 5th constituency	Céline Calvez	Renaissance
Hauts-de-Seine's 6th constituency	Constance Le Grip	Renaissance
Hauts-de-Seine's 7th constituency	Pierre Cazeneuve	Renaissance
Hauts-de-Seine's 8th constituency	Prisca Thevenot	Renaissance
Hauts-de-Seine's 9th constituency	Élisabeth de Maistre	The Republicans
Hauts-de-Seine's 10th constituency	Gabriel Attal	Renaissance
Hauts-de-Seine's 11th constituency	Aurélien Saintoul	La France Insoumise
Hauts-de-Seine's 12th constituency	Jean-Didier Berger	The Republicans
Hauts-de-Seine's 13th constituency	Christophe Mongardien	Renaissance

==== In the Senate ====
In the Senate, Hauts-de-Seine is represented by:

- André Gattolin (LREM), since 2011
- Xavier Iacovelli (LREM), since 2017
- Roger Karoutchi (LR), since 2009
- Christine Lavarde (LR), since 2017
- Hervé Marseille (UDI), since 2011
- Pierre Ouzoulias (PCF), since 2017
- Philippe Pemezec (LR), since 2017

== Tourism ==
Tourist attractions

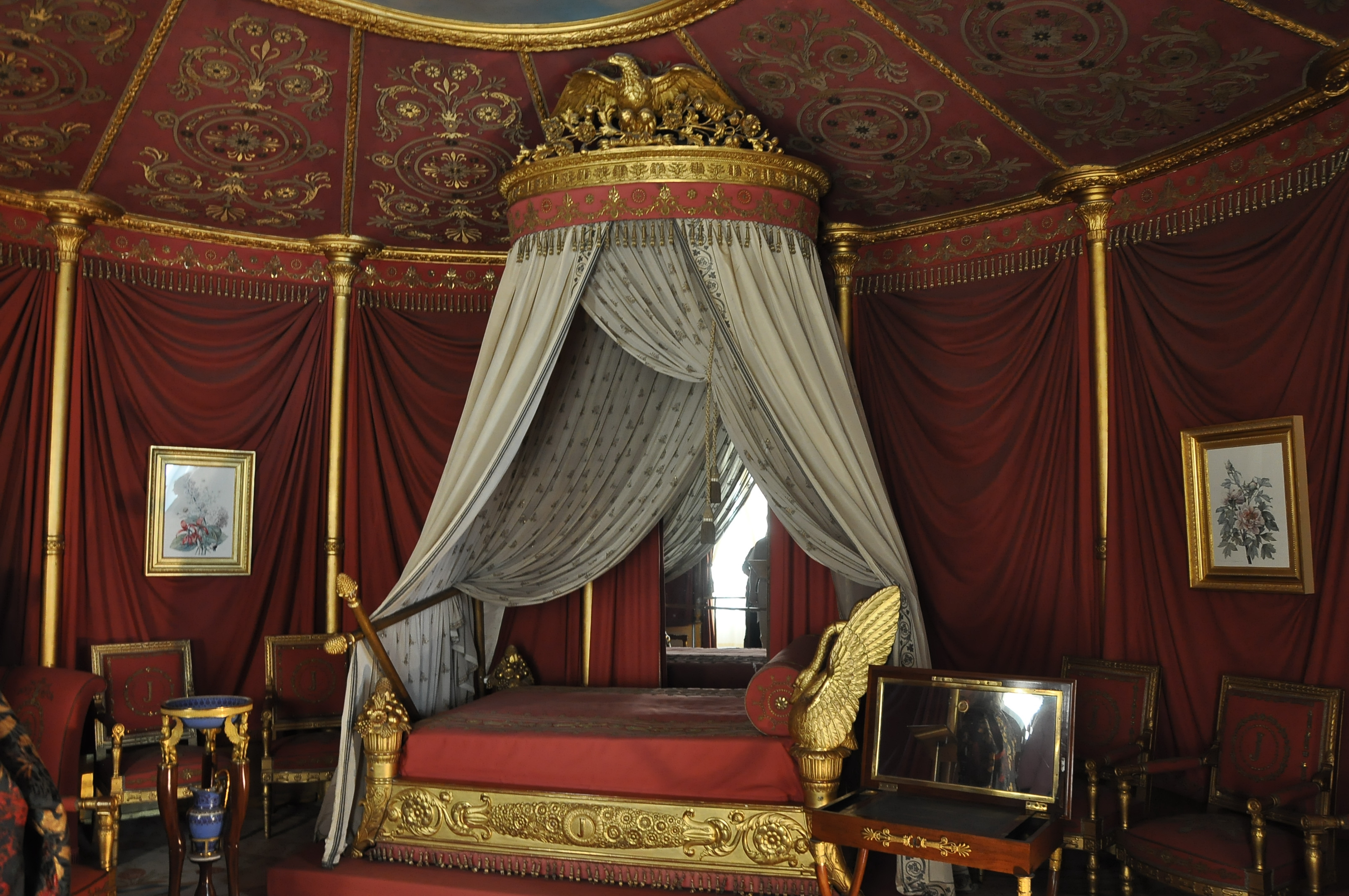
Empress Joséphine's bedroom at the Château de Malmaison

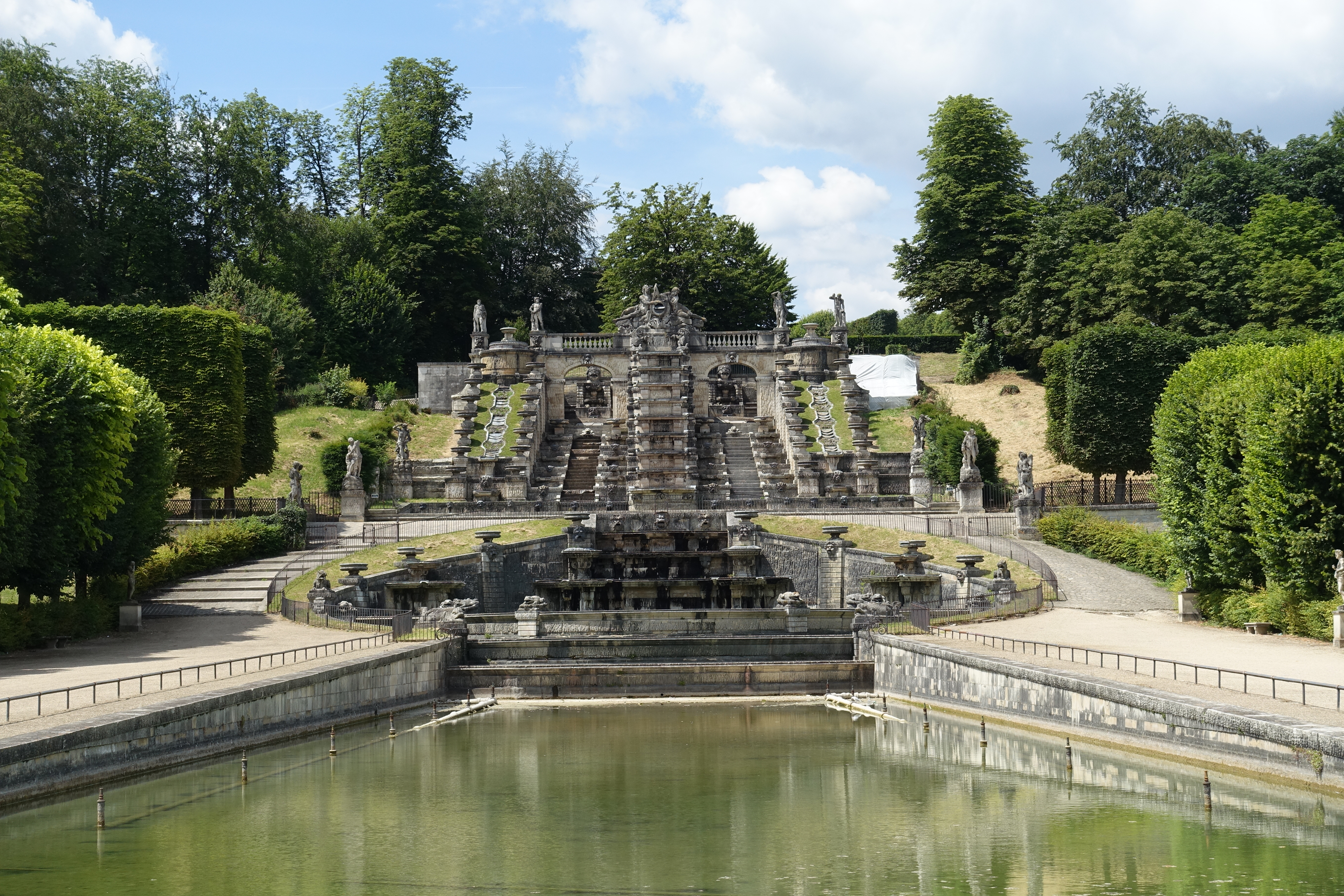
Grande Fontaine of the Parc de Saint-Cloud

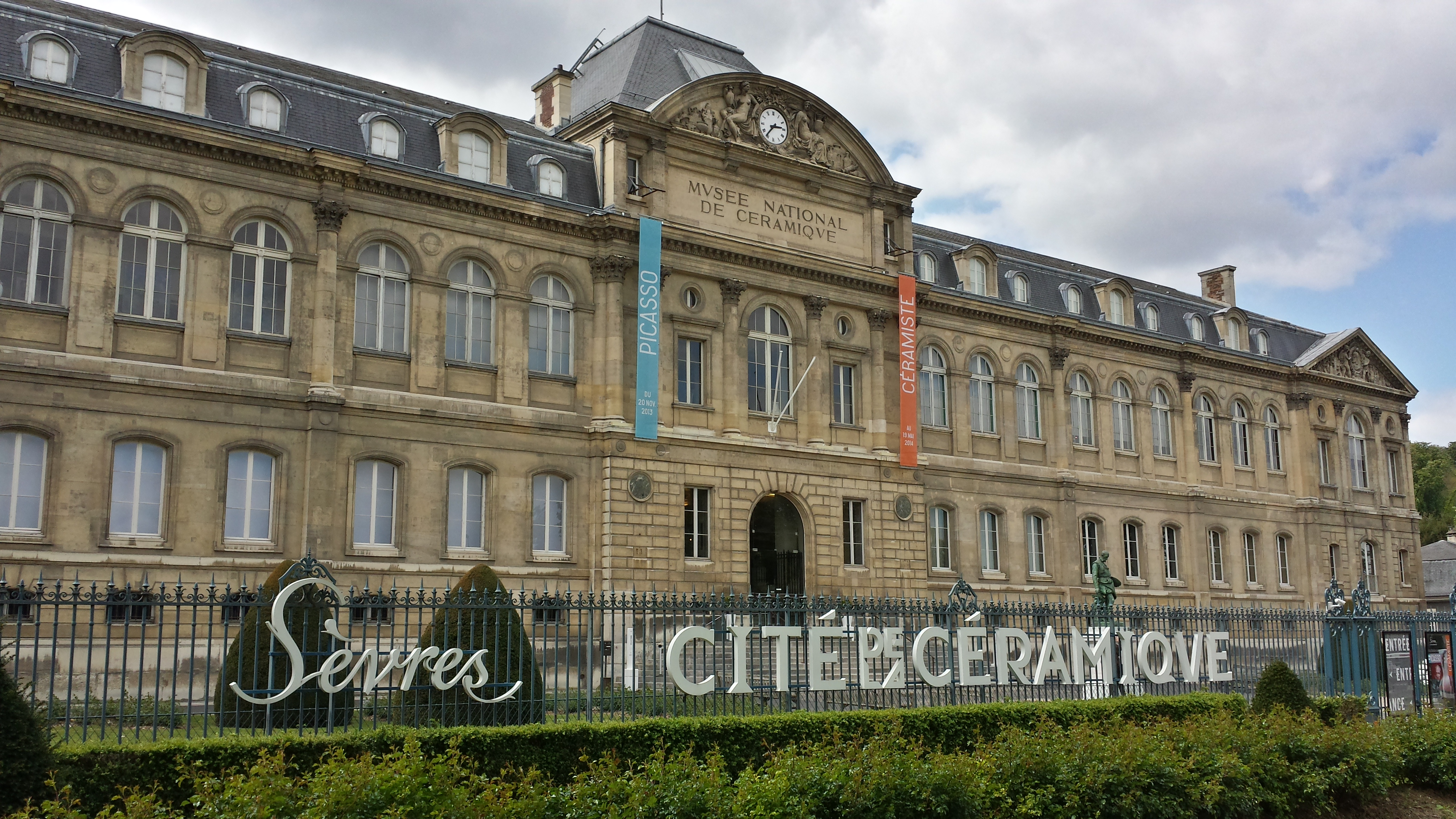
Cité de la céramique in Sèvres

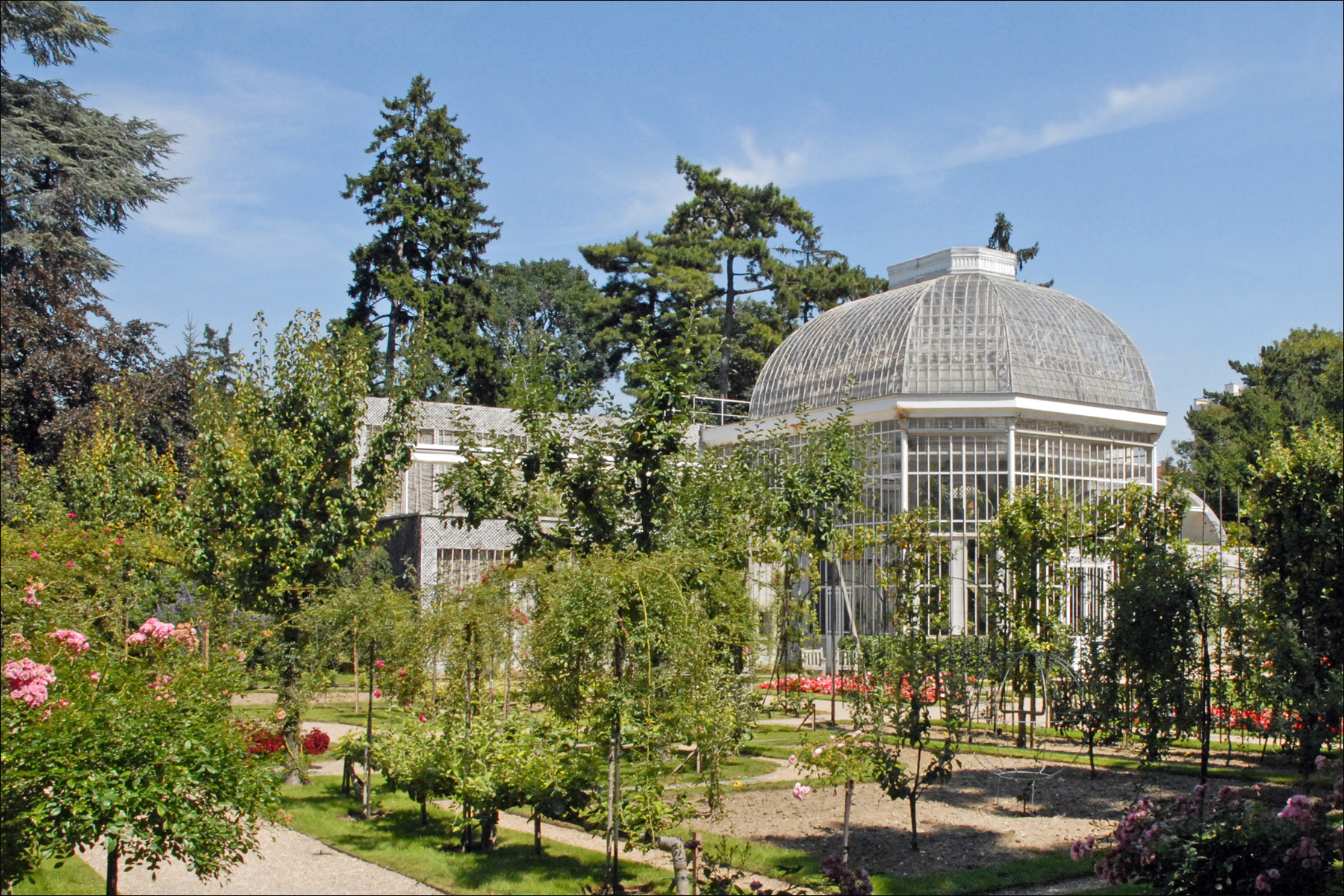
Japanese garden at the Musée Albert-Kahn in Boulogne-Billancourt

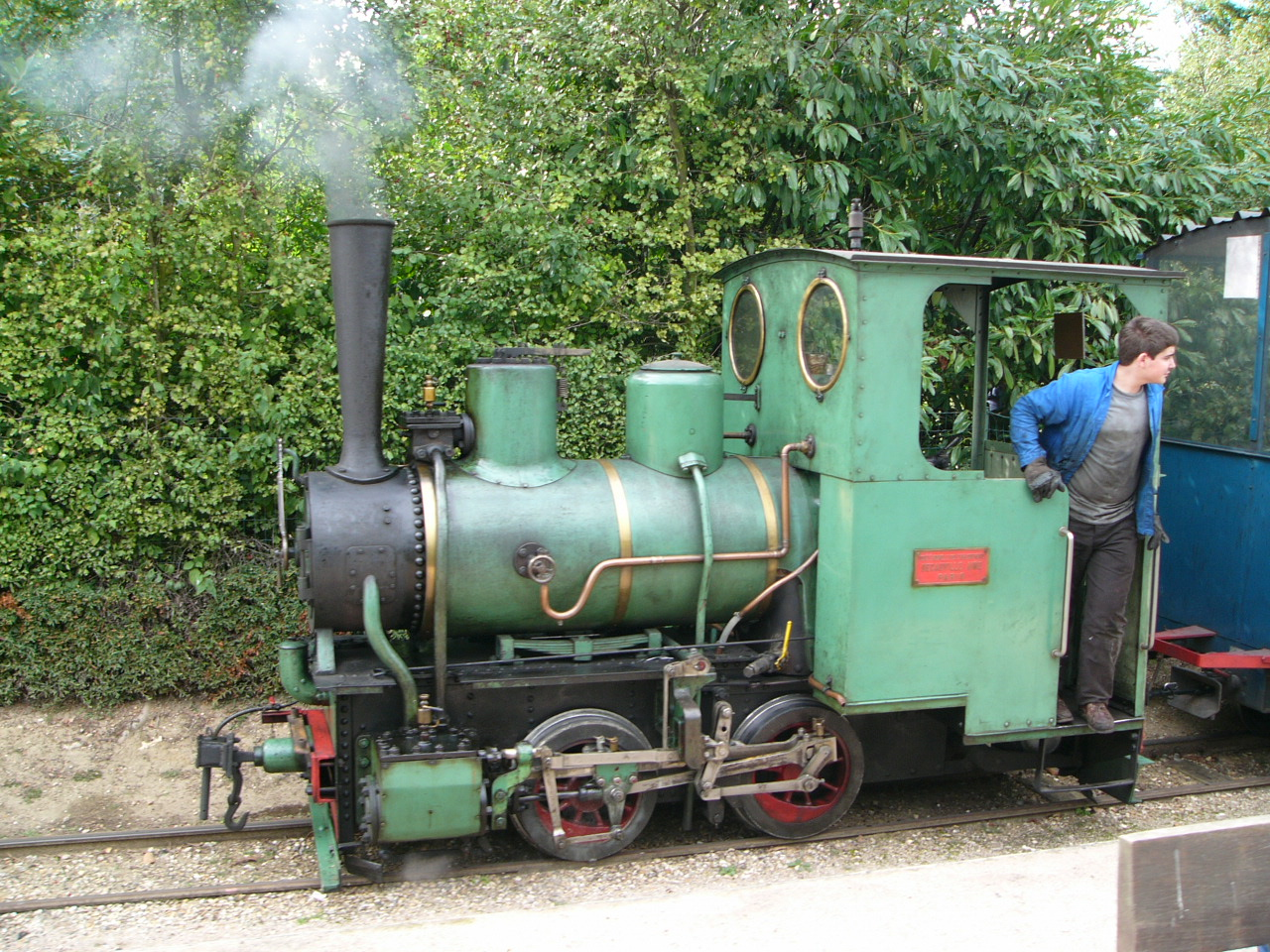
Decauville 0-4-0 wt steam locomotive, Hauts-de-Seine, France
