= Hôtel de Ville, Clamart =

Town hall in Clamart, France

Hôtel de Ville
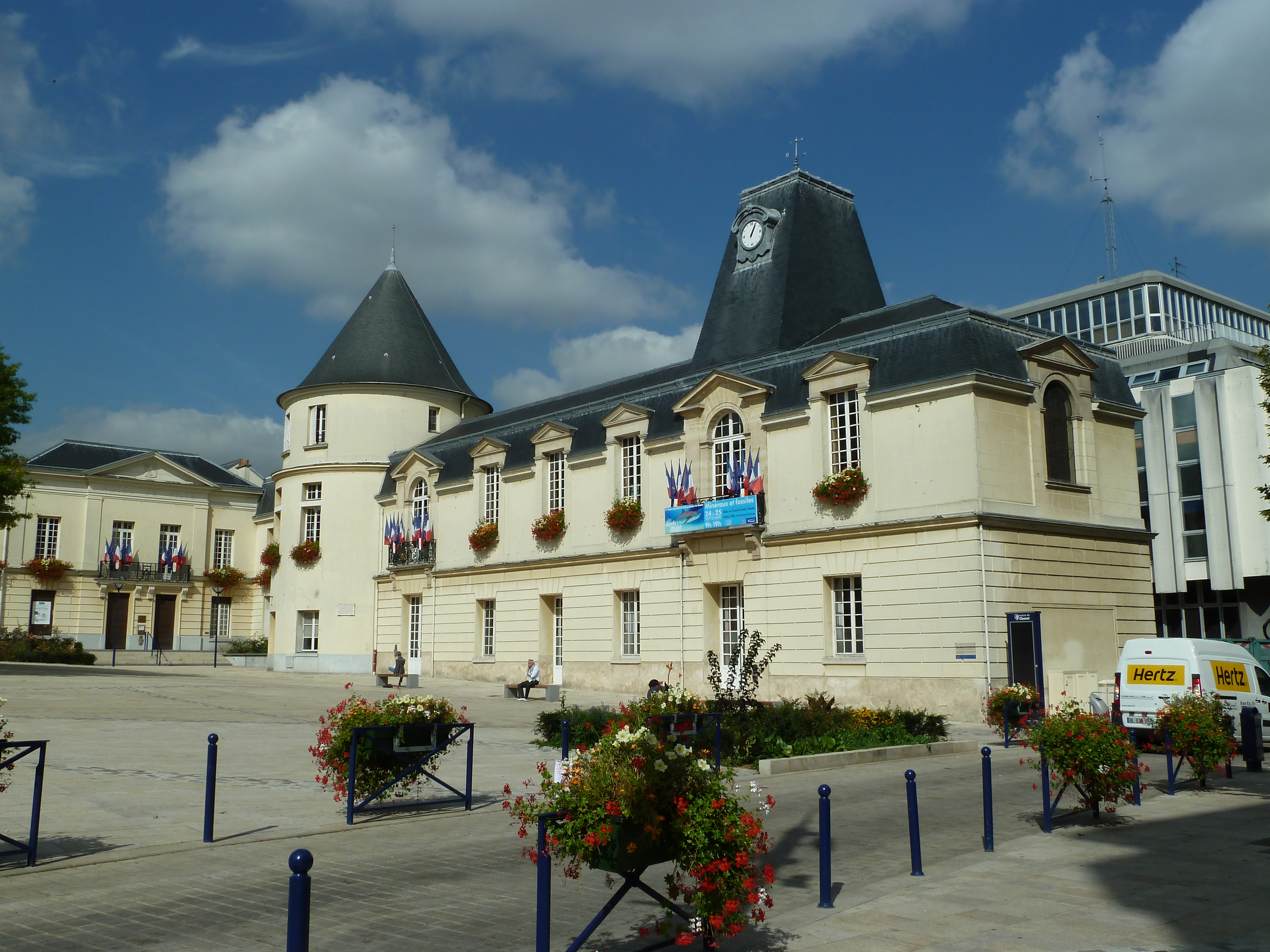
- The main frontage of the Hôtel de Ville in September 2011

General information
- Type: City hall
- Architectural style: Neoclassical style
- Location: Clamart, France
- Coordinates: 48.8006°N 2.2630°E
- Completed: 1878

Monument historique
- Official name: Hôtel de ville
- Type: Inscrit
- Designated: 1929
- Reference no.: PA00088094

The Hôtel de Ville (French pronunciation: [otɛl də vil], City Hall) is a municipal building in Clamart, Hauts-de-Seine, in the southwestern suburbs of Paris, standing on Place Maurice Gunsbourg. It was designated a monument historique by the French government in 1929.

== History ==
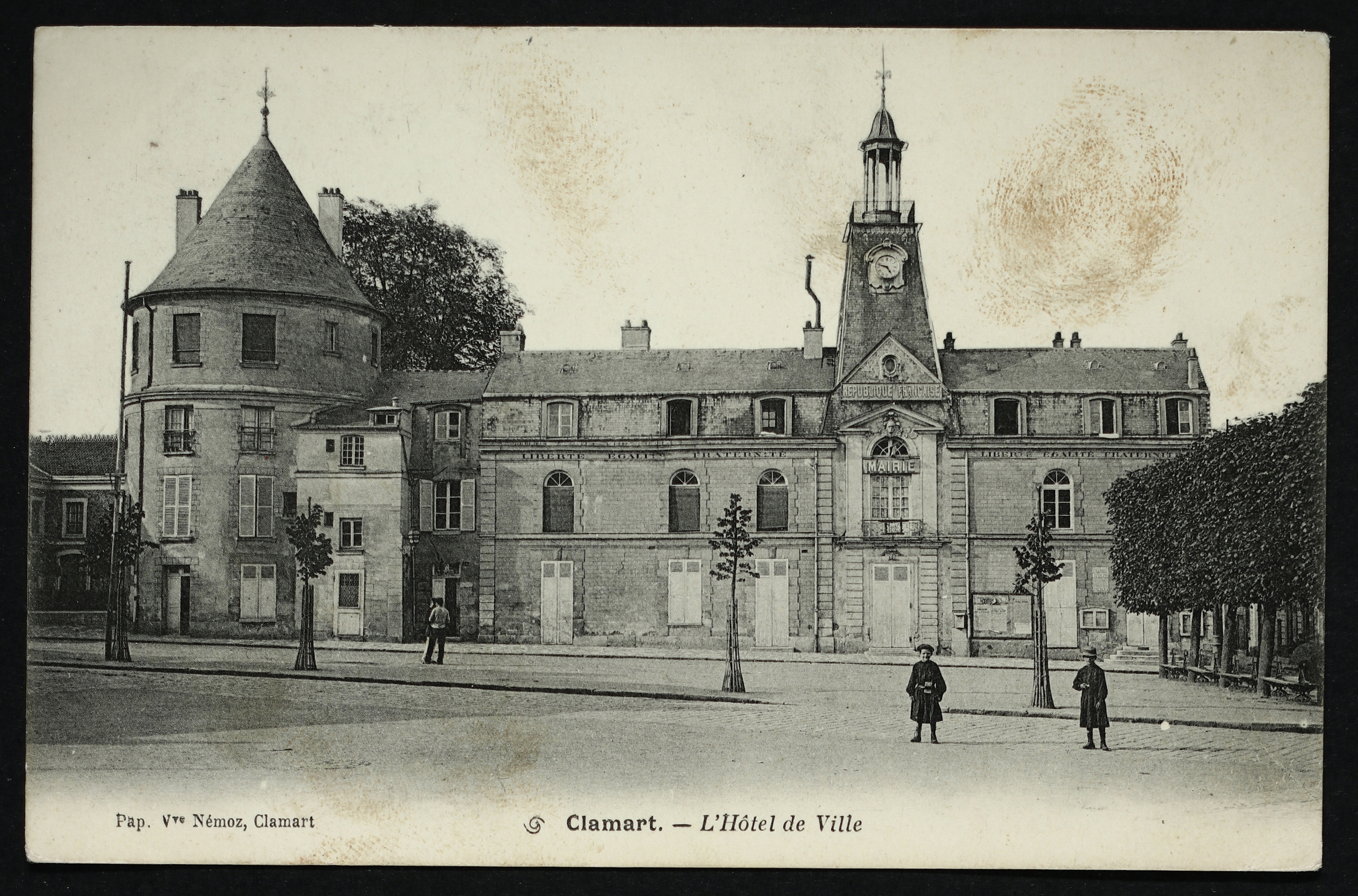
The building in 1900

Following the French Revolution the town council initially established offices at No. 14 Rue de l'Eglise. However, in the early 1840s, the town council led by the mayor, Denis Gogue, decided to acquire a more substantial property. The building it selected was Château de Barral. It had been designed in the neoclassical style, built in ashlar stone and was completed in the 17th century. The design involved an asymmetrical main frontage of six bays facing southwest onto the central square (now Place Maurice Gunsbourg). The fourth bay on the left featured a doorway flanked by banded pilasters on the ground floor, and a round headed French door with a balcony flanked by pilasters supporting a pediment on the first floor, all surmounted by a steep roof with a clock at the front and an open octagonal lantern above. The other bays incorporated doorways on the ground floor, round headed windows on the first floor, and small segmental headed windows at attic level. The purchase of the château was completed in 1842.

In the mid-19th century, the town council led by the mayor, Jules Hunebelle, decided to expand the complex by acquiring a three-storey round tower to the immediate northwest of the château. This tower, which had been used as a dovecote, dated from 1378. In the early 15th century, it was owned by a courtier, Guillaume Desprez, who served as falconer to King Charles VI. The purchase of the tower was completed in 1863 and a new grand staircase was subsequently installed in the section which connected it to the château to a design by Claude Naissant. In 1878, an extra floor was added to the tower to a design by Jacques Paul-Lequeux.

In the late-19th century, the town council still led by the long-serving mayor, Jules Hunebelle, decided to expand the complex further by acquiring a two-story domestic house to the immediate northwest of the tower. The house was designed in the neoclassical style, built in ashlar stone and was completed in the 17th century. The design involved a symmetrical main frontage of four bays facing southeast onto the central square. The two central bays, which were slightly projected forward, featured two doorways on the ground floor and two casement windows on the first floor; they were flanked by pilasters supporting a pediment. The outer bays were fenestrated in a similar style. The purchase was completed in 1894. The complex was completed by the installation of three additional bays, connecting the house to the tower, in 1923.

As well as the grand staircase, the other rooms created included the Salle des Commissions (commissions room), the Salle du Conseil (council chamber) and the Salle des Mariages (wedding room). The commissions room was decorated with Venetian paintings by Battaglia Matteo and Giordano Luca in 1895, while a painting depicting a quarry wheel, a reminder of the city's industrial past, was painted by Jean-Constant Pape and hung on the grand staircase in the early 20th century. The council chamber was decorated with paintings by A. Bossu and Cartier Eugène depicting local scenes in 1930.

During the Paris insurrection, part of the Second World War, four members of the French Forces of the Interior seized the town hall on 19 August 1944. German troops subsequently regained control and all four resistance fighters were immediately shot. This was a week before the official liberation of the town by the French 2nd Armoured Division, commanded by General Philippe Leclerc, on 25 August 1944.

The wedding room was decorated with Cubist-style paintings by Jacques Céria in 1950, and extensive restoration work on the façade was undertaken in 1990. The ground floor of the 17th century house was refurbished to a design by architects Bigeault & Taïeb Associates in 2018. The work involved replacing the two doorways with a single glass entrance and installing a stainless-steel porch around it. Inside, a series of pebble-shaped reception desks and stainless-steel structures were installed to brighten the appearance of the room.
