= Church of Saint-Jean-des-Deux-Moulins =

Roman Catholic church in Paris, France

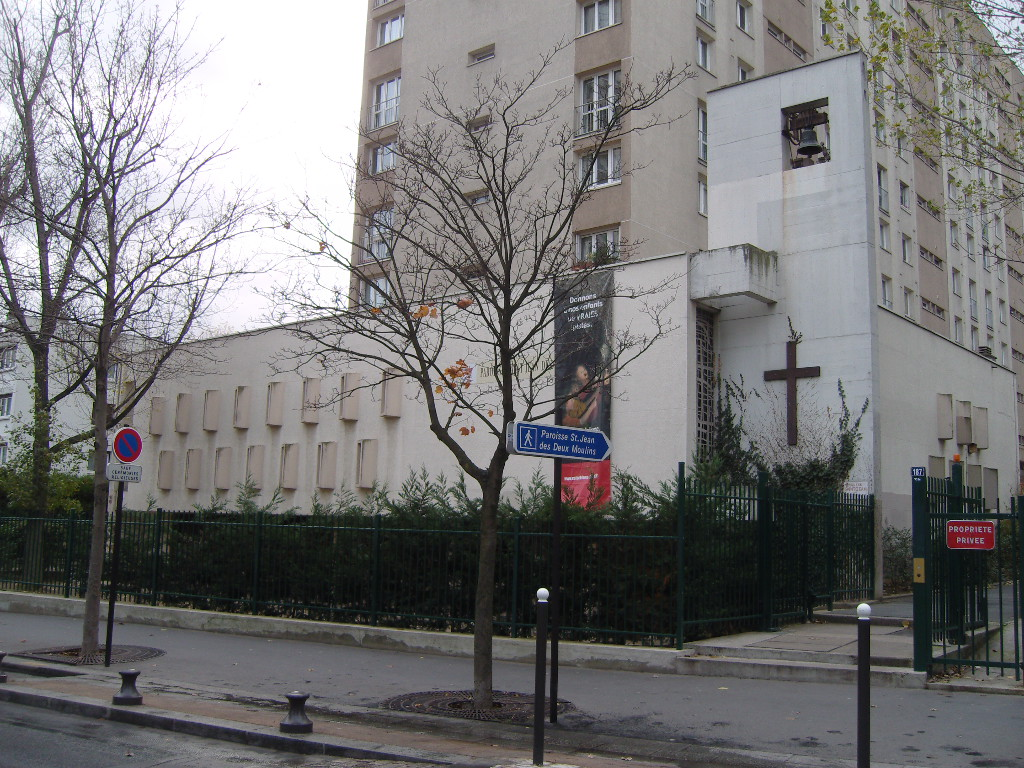

Religion
- Affiliation: Roman Catholic
- Province: Paris

Location
- Country: France
- Interactive map of Church of Saint-Jean-des-Deux-Moulins
- Coordinates: 48.830972°N 2.36083°E

'The Church of Saint-Jean-des-Deux Moulins (French: L''église Saint-Jean-des-Deux-Moulins) is a Catholic church situated at 185-187, street of Château-des-Rentiers in the 13th arrondissement of Paris. As with the vast majority of Catholic Churches in Paris, it follows the Latin Rite and is subject to the Archdiocese of Paris.

== History ==
The original chapel, built in 1968 to supplement the attendance at the Notre-Dame-de-la-Gare, is built with reinforced concrete by the architect Maurice Cammas. It was transformed into parish church in 1995.

Dedicated to John the Apostle, it bears the name of the former settlement which was situated between the boulevard de l'Hôpital and the street of Jenner, and which itself derived the name from the village of Deux-Moulins.

== See also ==
- List of churches in Paris
