= Church of Saint-Lambert, Vaugirard =

Catholic church in Paris

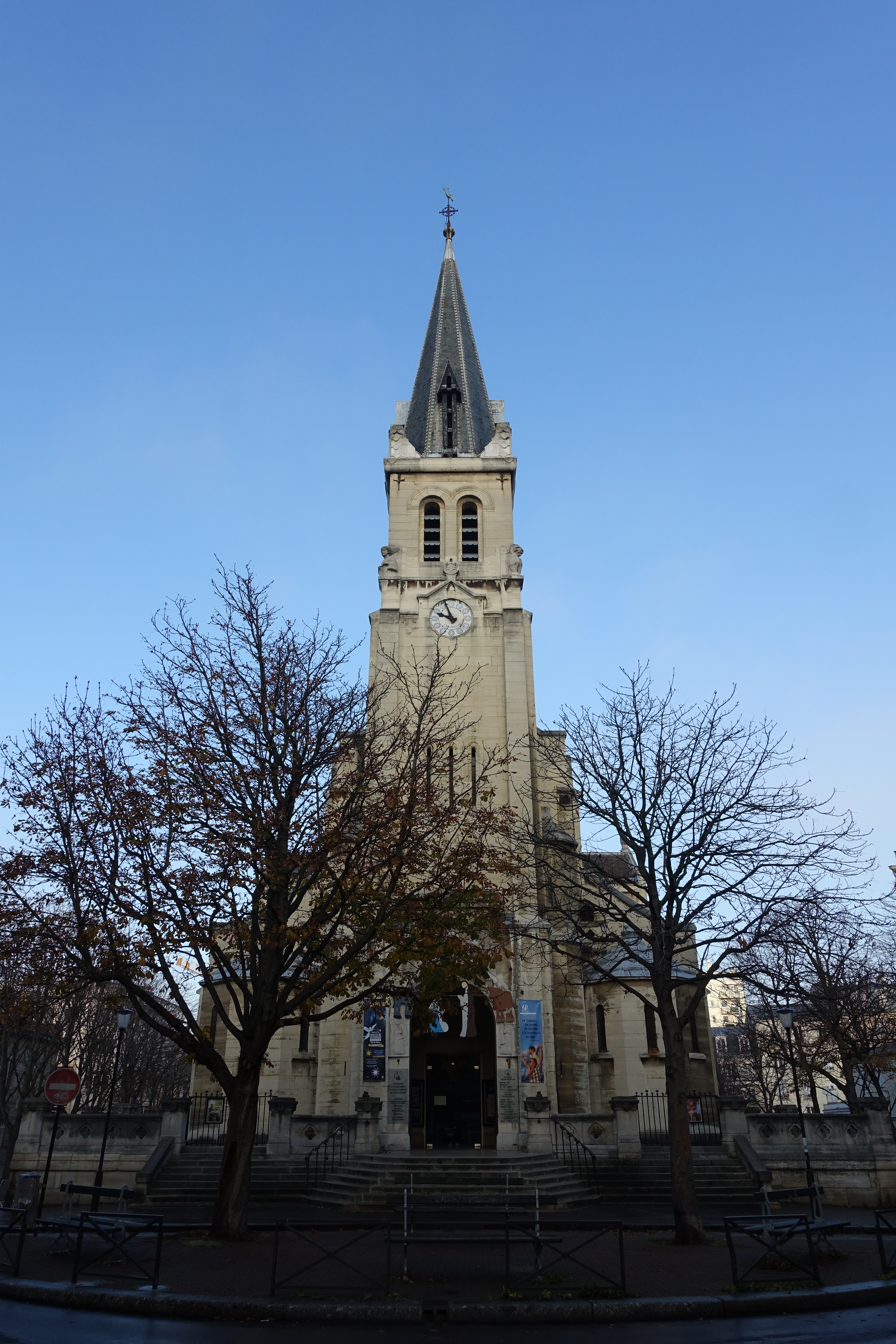

Religion
- Affiliation: Catholic Church
- Diocese: Paris
- Region: Île-de-France

Location
- Country: France
- Interactive map of Church of Saint-Lambert, Vaugirard
- Coordinates: 48°50′23″N 2°17′54″E

Architecture
- Architect: Claude Naissant
- Style: Neo-Gothic
- Completed: 1853

The Church of Saint-Lambert, Vaugirard, also known as Church of Saint-Lambert, Paris, is located on Rue Gerbert in the 15th arrondissement of Paris.

Its Neo-Romanesque style recalls that of many churches built in the 19th century. It measures 58 meters in length and 25.5 meters in width, with its bell tower reaching 50 meters in height. The architect was Claude Naissant.

== History ==
In the 13th century, 300 inhabitants moved closer to the country house built on a site previously called "Valboistron" or "Vauboitron" (traditionally interpreted as the "valley of the stables") by the monks of Saint-Germain-des-Prés. In memory of its founder, Gérard de Moret, abbot of Saint-Germain-des-Prés from 1255 to 1278, the locality became "val Gérard", then "Vaugirard".

The first church in the village, built at the edge of the main street (its location now forms what has been known since 1937 as Place Henri-Rollet) was established as a parish by the Bishop of Paris on February 23, 1342. Originally dedicated to Mary, it received the relics of Saint Lambert of Maastricht in 1453 and was henceforth called Notre-Dame-de-Saint-Lambert. From the 17th century onwards, it was named Saint-Lambert.

It was first expanded in 1400 and then had additional openings made. During the Revolution, it was stripped of its ornaments and relics and repurposed as a hay store. In 1794, it was damaged by the explosion at the Grenelle powder plant, which shifted three of its pillars. It was restored for religious use on the 2nd Sansculottides, or complementary day, in Year III (September 17, 1795). After receiving a new, authenticated bone of Saint Lambert in 1828, the church was refurnished and fitted with new bells, but was still described by its priest in 1842 as having a "poor and unpleasant appearance", only appealing to "pious souls." Wedged between Rue Notre-Dame and the main street, (Note: Thiéry notes, in 1787, "One must descend several steps to enter from the main street.") with no room for expansion, the church had become too small. Among other notable events in the village's history, the marriage of Marie-Anne and Jean-Honoré Fragonard took place there on June 17, 1769. However, the "old monument, which was not of interest from an artistic point of view", whose "only monumental feature was its bell tower, a square tower with buttresses in the 13th-century style", no longer found favor with the people of Vaugirard in the 19th century.

On August 22, 1846, the municipal council of what was still the commune of Vaugirard, a village of 6,500 inhabitants in 1825, voted to build a new church on land bequeathed for this purpose by the former director of the Paternal Association of the Knights of Saint Louis, Nicolas Groult d'Arcy. This site is where the current church stands, framed by Rue de l’Abbé-Groult, Rue Blomet, Rue Maublanc, and Rue de Vaugirard. Three months later, the same municipal council voted to demolish the old church.

The Revue archéologique commented:

The church of Saint-Lambert in Vaugirard, one of the oldest in the Paris region, is to be demolished [...] Simon de Bucy, the first president of the Parliament of Paris at that time, expanded the chapel twice, explaining the irregularity of its construction, which has no architectural merit.

However, La Presse protested:

The church of Saint-Lambert in Vaugirard [...] is to be demolished: 1) because it obstructs the public road; 2) because it is in danger of collapsing; 3) because it is too small. One of the oldest in the Paris suburbs, this church is tied to interesting historical memories of France's history; it is not a monument, to be sure, but it is a modest building with some uncommon architectural features. The first objection can easily be addressed [...] If the church needs repairs, why not do them? Could there not be savings instead of spending large amounts of money to build a Greek or Roman temple? As for the third reason, why not build a second church [...] for the more distant parts of the district?

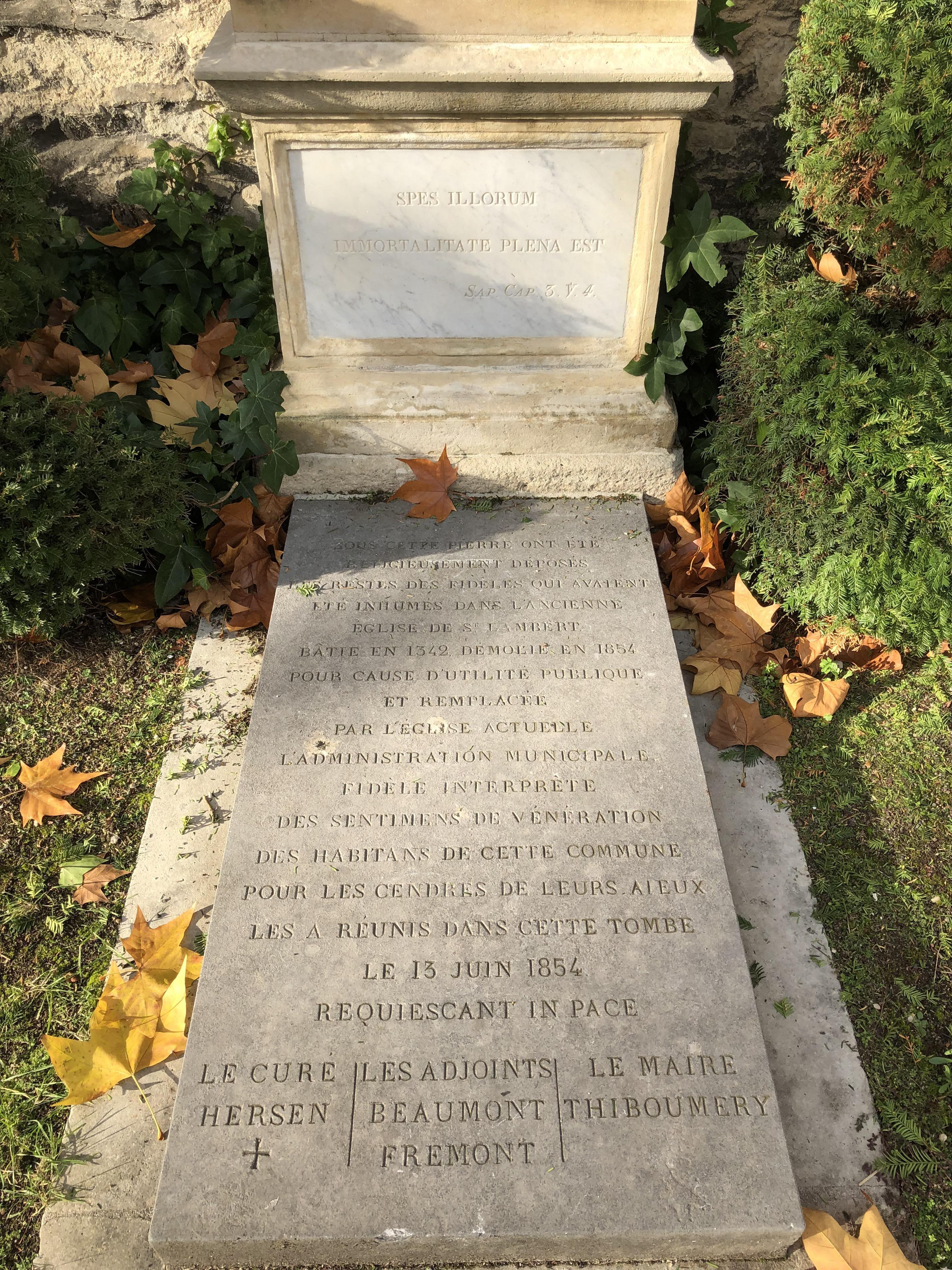
Vaugirard Cemetery (Paris). Inscription on the vault containing the remains discovered during the demolition of the old church of Saint-Lambert. (Note: The text of the inscription on the tombstone reads: "Under this stone are religiously deposited the remains of the faithful who had been buried in the old church of St. Lambert, built in 1342, demolished in 1854 for reasons of public utility and replaced by the current church. The municipal administration, a faithful interpreter of the veneration of the inhabitants of this community for the ashes of their ancestors, gathered them in this tomb on June 13, 1854. Requiescant in pace. The parish priest Hersen + The assistants Beaumont Fremont The mayor Thiboumery".)

In 1853, a city councilor attempted to preserve at least the bell tower and a chapel, while another suggested keeping "the bell tower and its dial". The demolition was approved by 19 votes to 4, while the proposal to save the bell tower was rejected by 18 votes to 5. The old church was demolished in March 1854, and the sale of materials from its demolition brought in 4,107 francs and 55 centimes, far less than the 12,000 francs hoped for, and less than a hundredth of the cost of constructing the new church. The "remains" of those buried in the parish church, around three hundred bodies, were "carefully transported and placed with the symmetry observed in the catacombs" in a grave located at the back of the Vaugirard cemetery.

On May 28, 1853, the new church was blessed, and the first mass was celebrated the following day. Its consecration by the Archbishop of Paris, Mgr Sibour, took place on June 19, 1856, with a full day of ceremonies attended by the Prefect of the Seine, Georges Eugène Haussmann, the Mayor of Vaugirard, Mr. Thibouméry, "many ecclesiastics from Paris and the surrounding areas," and "several officials from the prefecture in uniform".

On January 1, 1860, the commune of Vaugirard was annexed by Paris, and the church gave its name to the Quartier Saint-Lambert, one of the 80 administrative districts of Paris (the 57th district) and one of the 4 administrative districts of the 15th arrondissement.

In 1870, during the siege of Paris, with the mairie being repeatedly but unpredictably targeted by enemy artillery, weddings, including civil ceremonies, were held in the crypt of the church.

== Description ==
=== Exterior ===
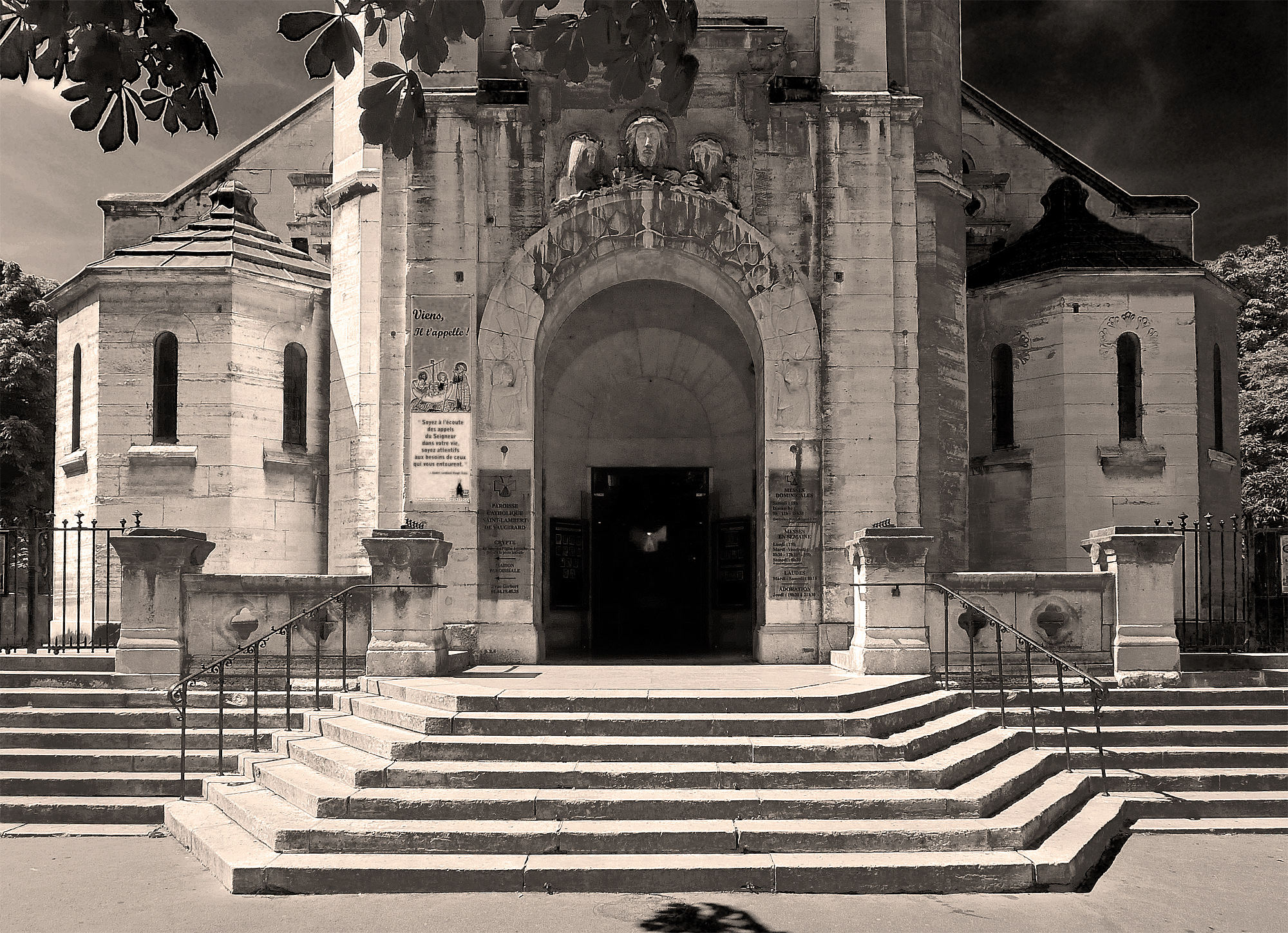
The porch.

Lucien Lambeau was doubtless exacting a small price for the pain he felt in recounting the destruction of the old church when he wrote about the current one: "The monument, without a defined style and with no pretension of having one, presents itself with a tall stone bell tower topped by an octagonal slate spire. [...] At the base a semi-circular portal opens whose top is surrounded by a circular frame adorned with decoration. [...] Above this porch, there are three sculpted stone busts: Christ, flanked by a crowned Virgin and an angel holding an incense burner. According to M. Émile de Labédollière, in Nouveau Paris, these three figures would be by M. Toussaint. From this point, the bell tower rises in a lamentable nakedness, interrupted by the opening of three very narrow paired bays, framed by a simple molding. At the top of its square shaft, there is a clock face, at the corners of which are sculpted, in a very crude and anonymous style, the symbols of the four evangelists [...] The side aisles, the nave, and the apse have no sculptural decoration, and semi-circular windows without any decoration are visible. [...] One could say that this ensemble is more a mason's work than an architect's. There is no character, no art, and even less inspiration. It is the modern and administrative church in all its nullity, without the slightest pretension."

On the other hand, Le Mémorial des Pyrénées saw it as "a rather fortunate specimen of 10th-century Romanesque architecture". La Revue des beaux-arts granted the building "an original character, varied, and in sum, with a pleasant appearance." Adolphe Joanne, who judged the old church as "offering nothing interesting", found that the new church, especially its façade, "presents too many lines." Bayet saw it as "one of the most marked and purest types of Romanesque style, which has been imitated in several churches built during the last century. The main façade [...] is not without character, with its stairway, the stone balustrade bordering it, its narrow porch flanked by two small towers, and its tall square bell tower with two tiers, topped by an octagonal spire [...]. The interior is no less picturesque, with its bare stone architecture, a severe layout, and one considers with interest these high walls whose coldness is not cheered by any frivolous decoration [...]"

Bruno Foucart & Hamon considered Claude Naissant as one of the pioneers of the revival of the round arch, celebrated by Léonce Reynaud: "The first church he designed, Saint-Lambert of Vaugirard, whose preliminary project dates back to 1846, was immediately recognized by César Daly as an original work. The nave interior constitutes the most perfect synthesis of Roman monumentalism and Romanesque design. The arch is paired with a column engaged with a Corinthian capital, but in such a way that the arcade dictates its law to the support, unlike what classical usage of the orders would dictate."

=== Interior ===
- In its Sacred Heart chapel, the church contained a decoration by the painter Jean-François Brémond: Christ in Limbo, which has since been removed.
- Altar decoration of the Virgin by Charles Lameire.
- Statue of Our Lady of Pardon (18th century), found and restored in the 19th century.
- Painting (La vie de Saint Lambert) The Life of Saint Lambert, Bishop of Maastricht, by Dorothée Sers Hermann.
- Golden wood and alabaster cross, and altar cladding in marble – Mireille Bouchard (2000).
Choir

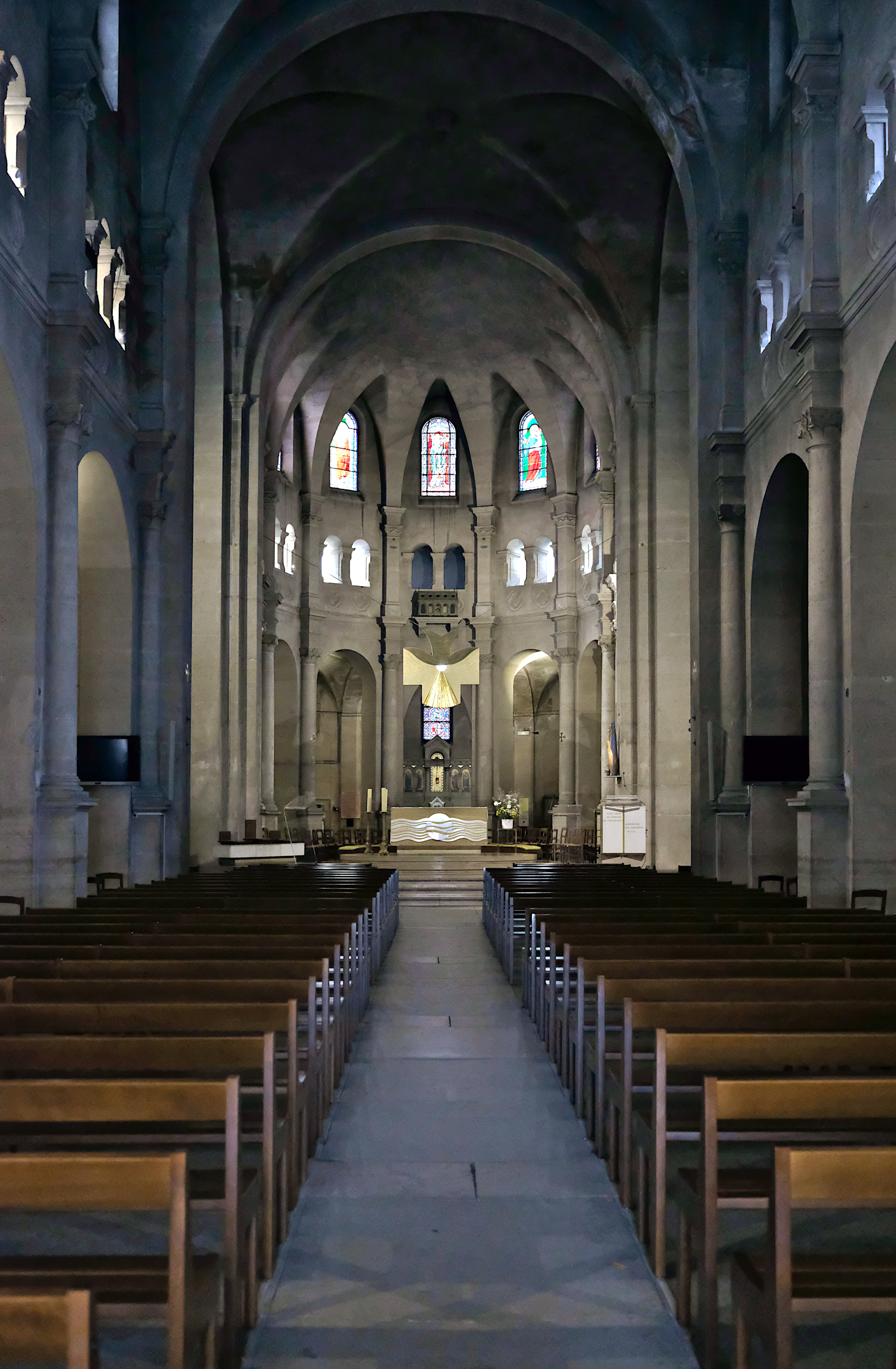
Nave, towards the choir.

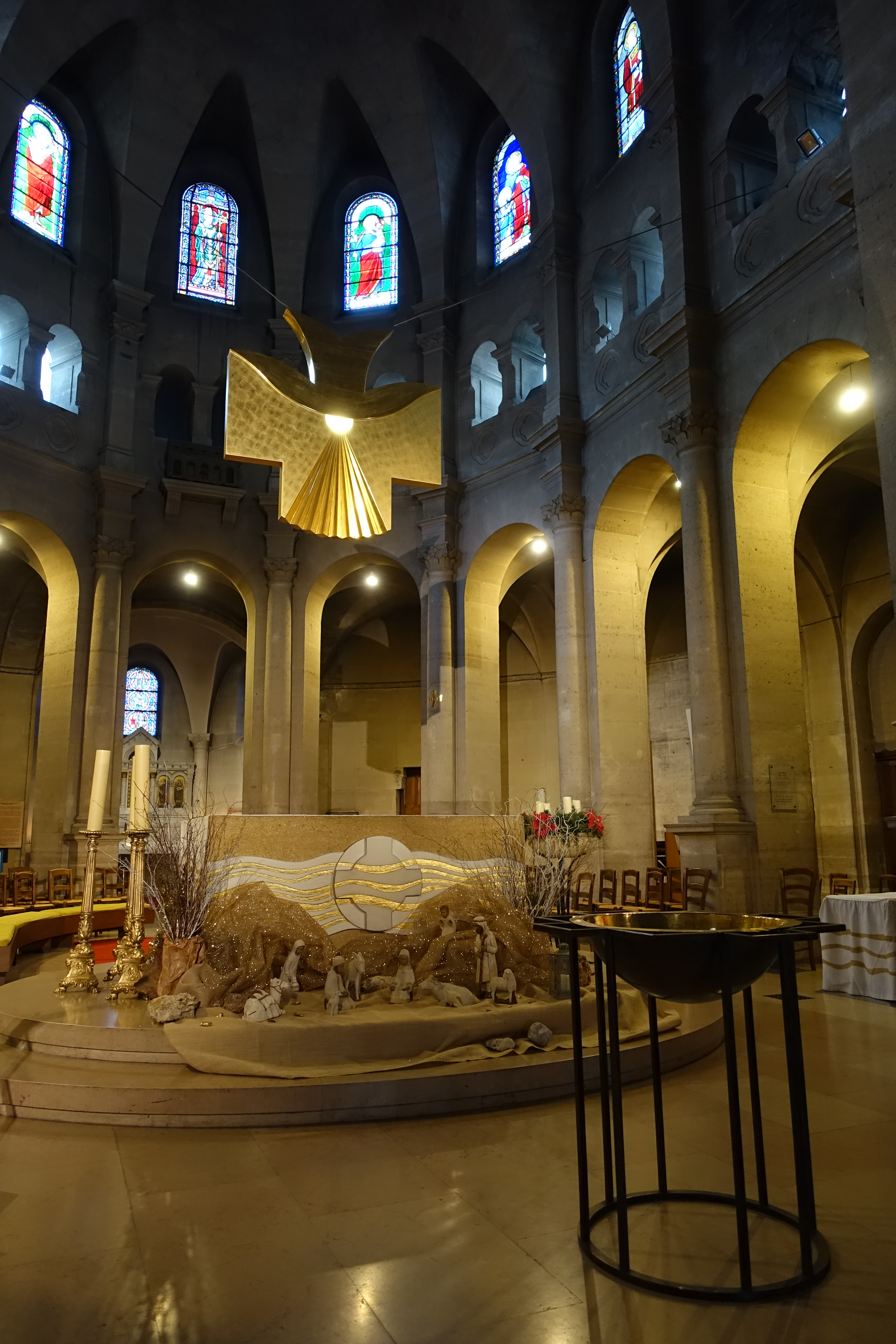
Altar and baptismal font.
Apse

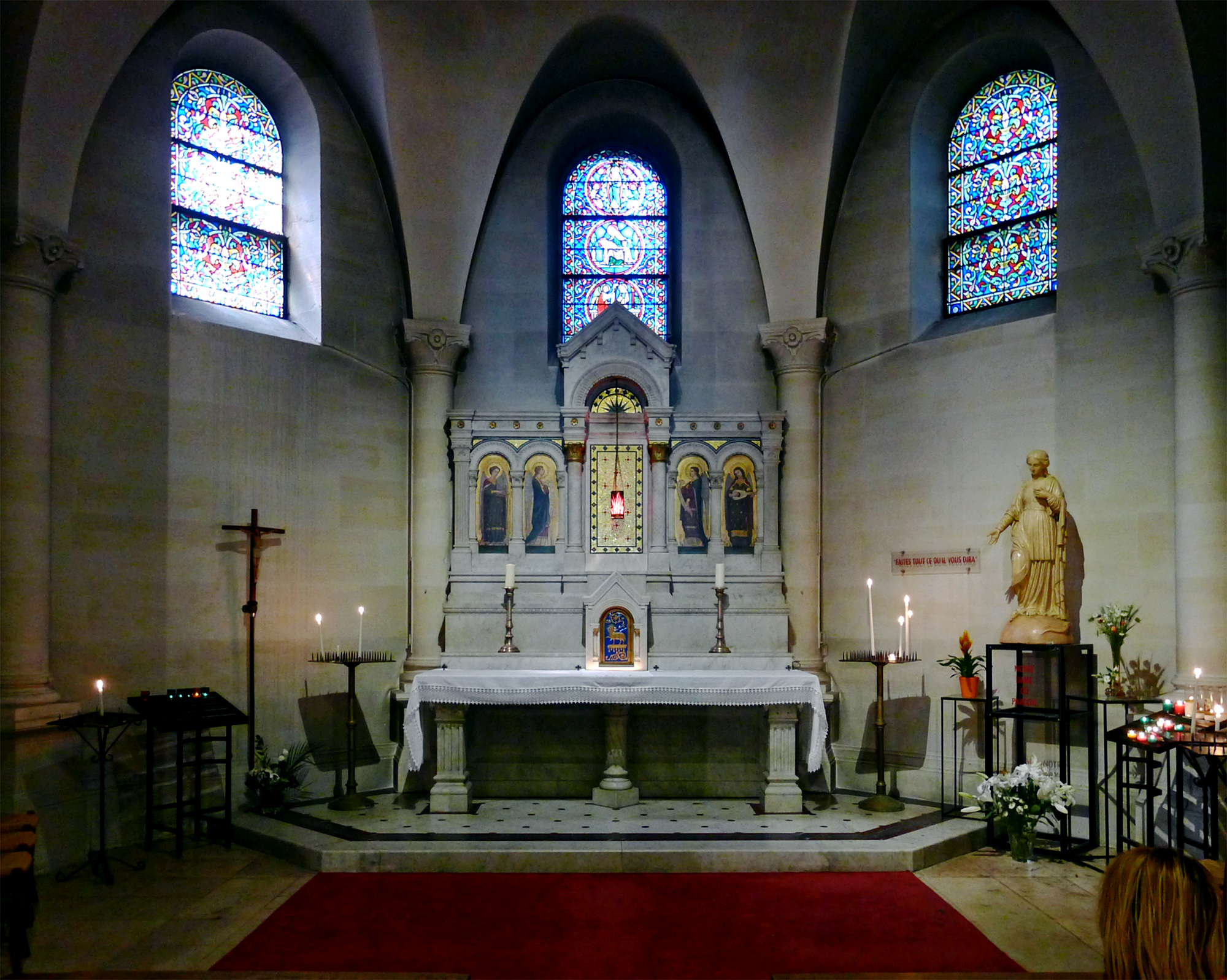
Chapel in the apse.

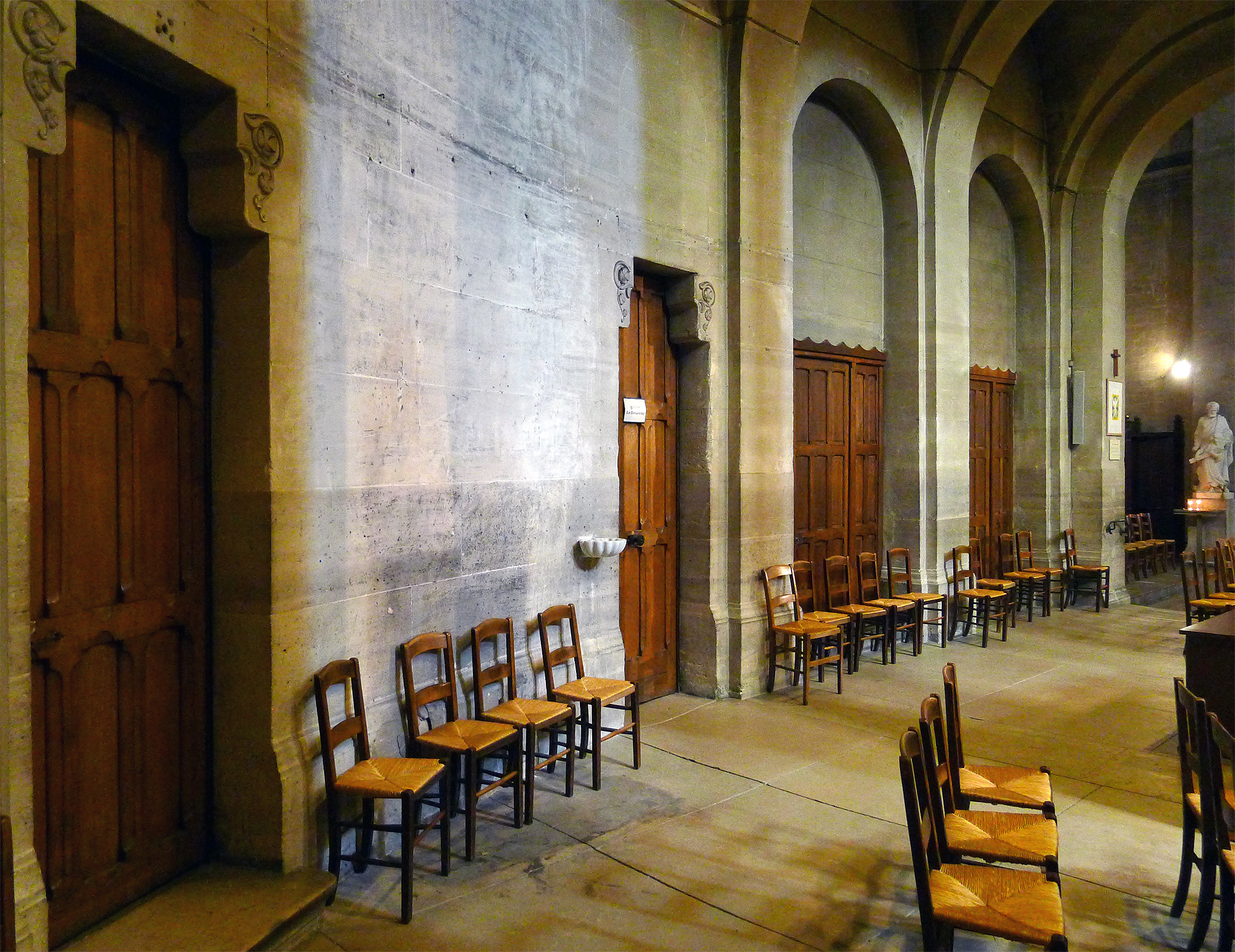
Ambulatory.
Organ

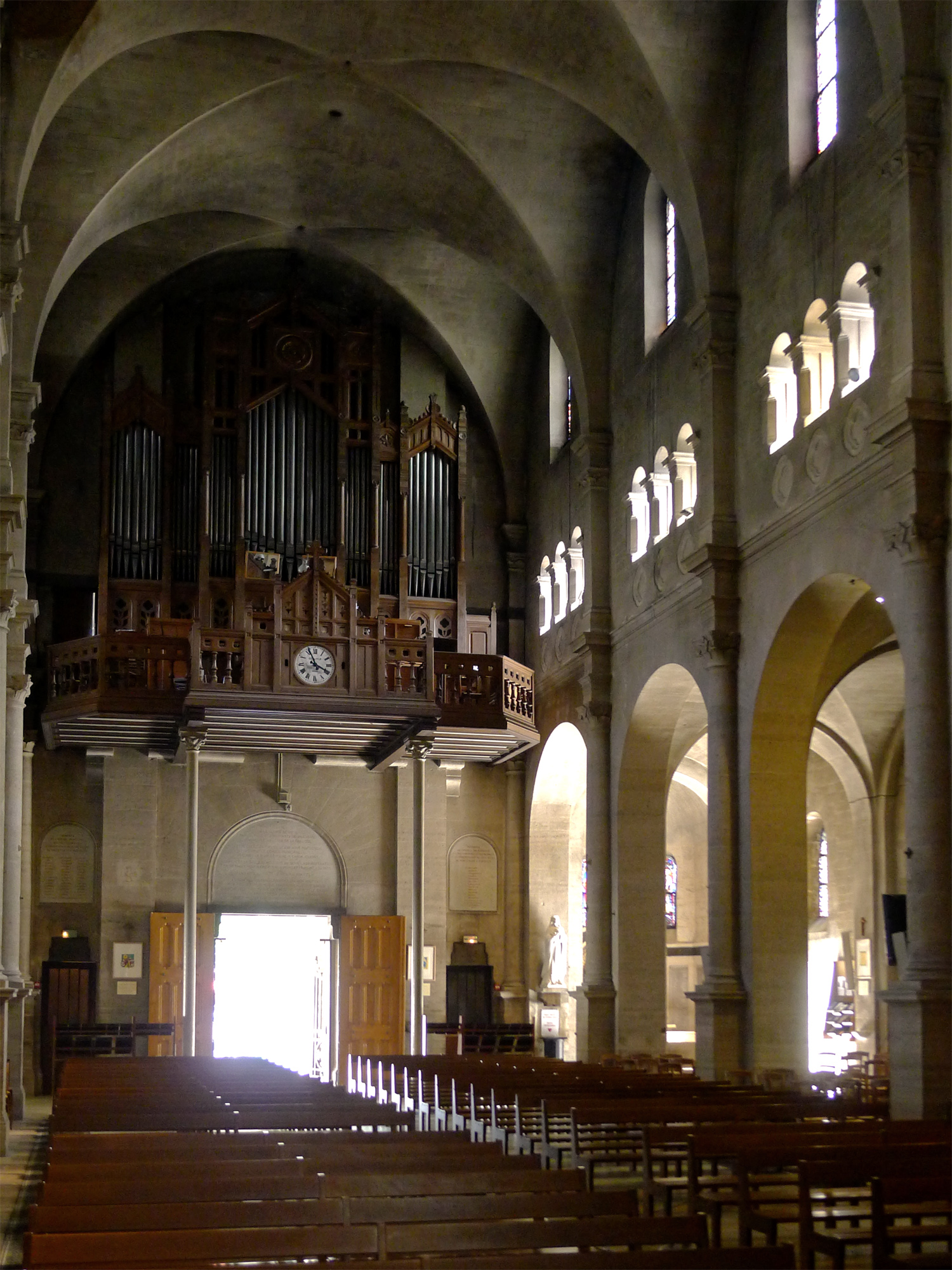
Location in the gallery.

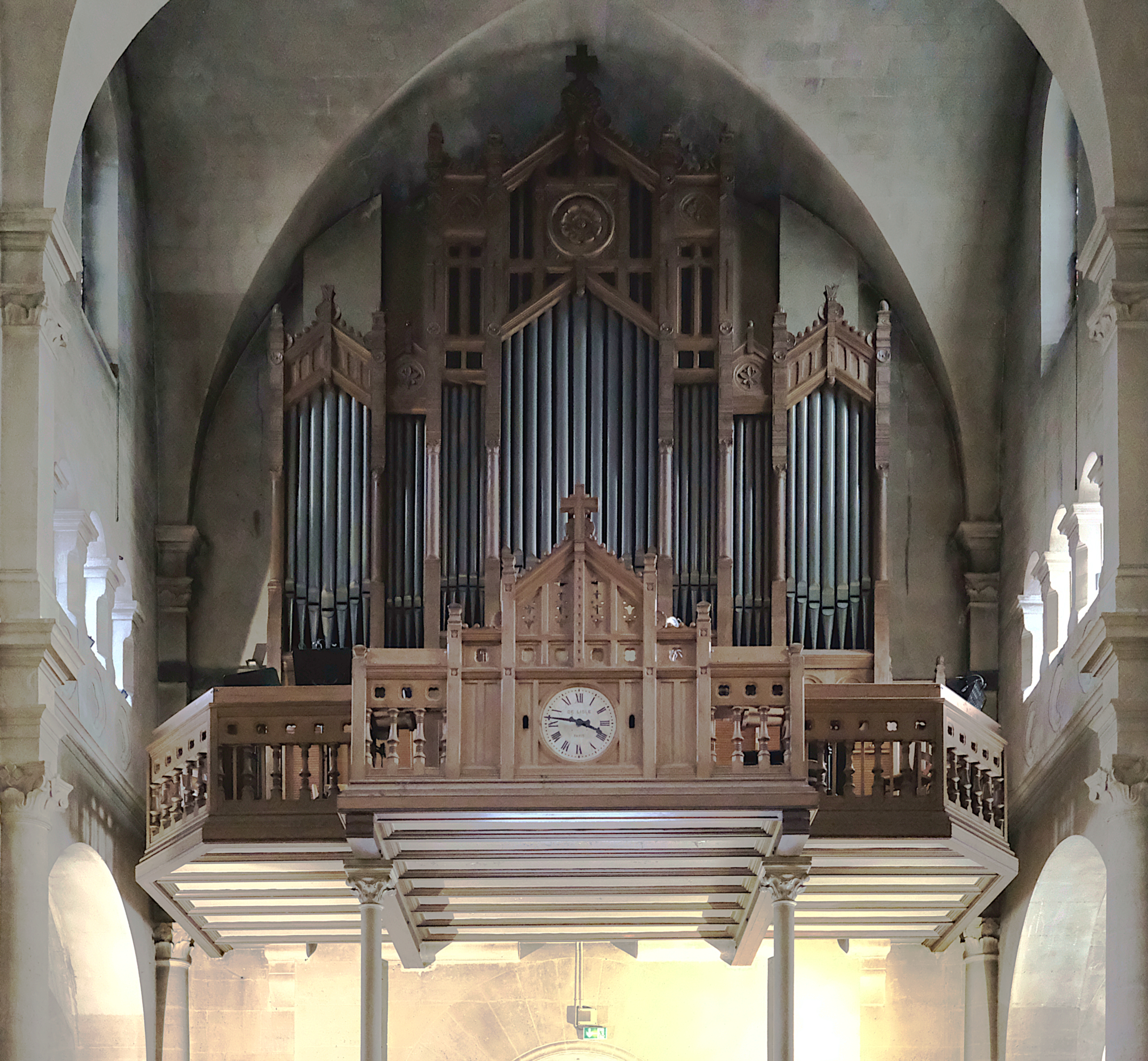
Close-up.
Works of art

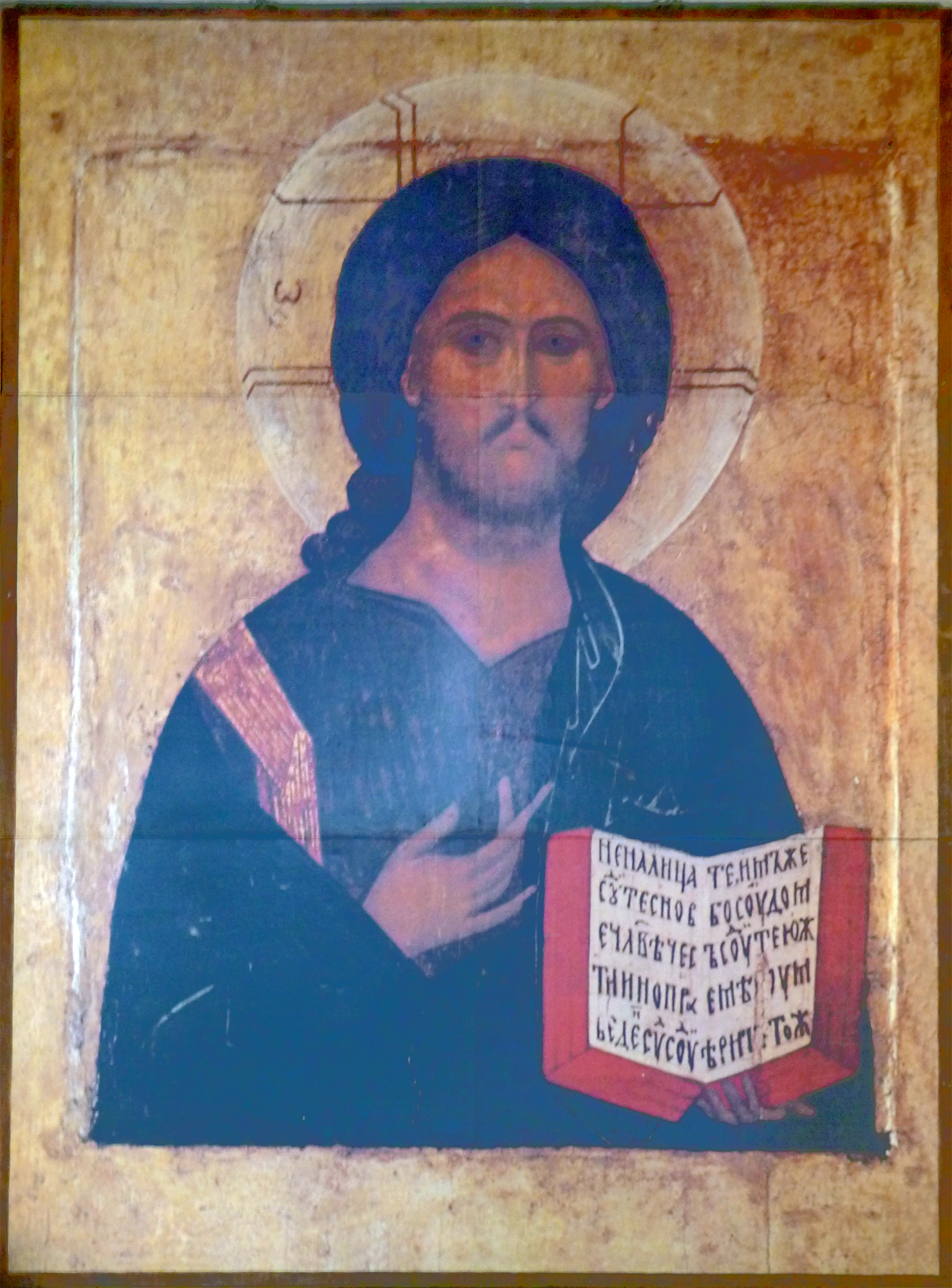
Icon of Christ.

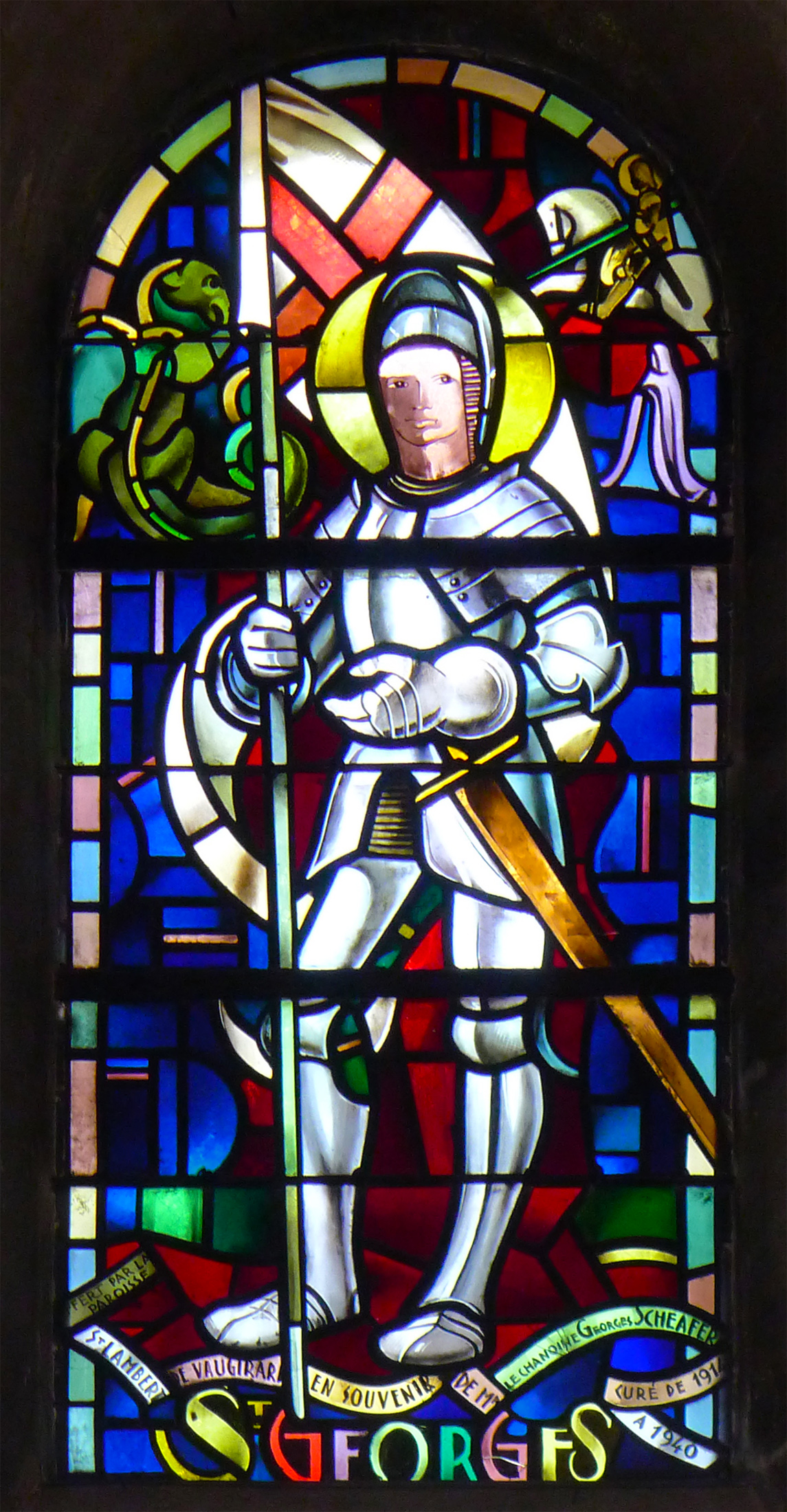
Stained glass window of Saint George.

== Priests ==
- 1515: Jean de Monthelon: "who is the author of some works".
- 1788-1807: Gilbert-Jacques Martinant de Préneuf (February 14, 1757 – September 15, 1827), parish priest of Notre-Dame-de-Saint-Lambert in Vaugirard in 1788, emigrated from 1792 to 1801, then resumed his parish duties until 1807 and worked on restoring the church after the damage it suffered during the Revolution. He later became the priest of the church of Saint John the Baptist, Sceaux, and then, in 1821, the priest of the church of Saint-Leu-Saint-Gilles in Paris. Author of Souvenirs.
- 1831: Fr. Jacolet until 1831.
- 1832–1849: Fr. Gaudreau, appointed on March 26, 1832.

== Cinema ==
The church appears in the film Heaven Sent by Jean-Pierre Mocky, filmed with Bourvil in 1963 starting from minute 23. It was also in the church forecourt that François Truffaut filmed the main scene of his movie The Bride Wore Black in 1967.

== Painting ==
The MUDO - Musée de l'Oise in Beauvais holds two works by Maurice Boudot-Lamotte (1878–1958), one painted around 1913 and the other in 1918, depicting the church of Saint-Lambert in Vaugirard.

== See also ==
- List of religious buildings in Paris
- Roman Catholic Archdiocese of Paris
- Arrondissements of Paris
- Quarters of Paris

== Bibliography ==
- Lebeuf, Abbé (1883). Histoire de la ville et de tout le diocèse de Paris [History of the city and the entire diocese of Paris] (in French). Vol. 1. Paris: Féchoz et Letouzey. p. 483.
- Gaudreau, Louis (1842). Histoire de Vaugirard ancien et moderne [History of Vaugirard, past and present] (in French). Paris: G.-A. Dentu.
- de Lamarque, Jules (1859). Vaugirard en 1859 [Vaugirard in 1859] (in French). Paris: Lallemand-Lépine.
- Bayet, Jean (1910). Les édifices religieux, XVIIe, XVIIIe, XIXe siècles [Religious buildings, 17th, 18th, and 19th centuries] (in French). Paris: H. Laurens.
- Lambeau, Lucien (1912). Histoire des communes annexées à Paris en 1859 : Vaugirard [History of the municipalities annexed to Paris in 1859: Vaugirard] (PDF) (in French). Paris: Ernest Leroux.
- Rebufat, Jean (1930). Histoire de la paroisse Saint-Lambert de Vaugirard [History of the parish of Saint-Lambert de Vaugirard] (PDF) (in French). Paris: Jean Rebufat.
- Foucart, Bruno; Hamon, Françoise (2006). L'architecture religieuse au XIXe siècle : entre éclectisme et rationalisme [Religious architecture in the 19th century: between eclecticism and rationalism] (in French). Presses Paris Sorbonne. ISBN 978-2-84050-442-9.
