= Hôtel de Ville, Sceaux =

Town hall in Sceaux, France

Hôtel de Ville
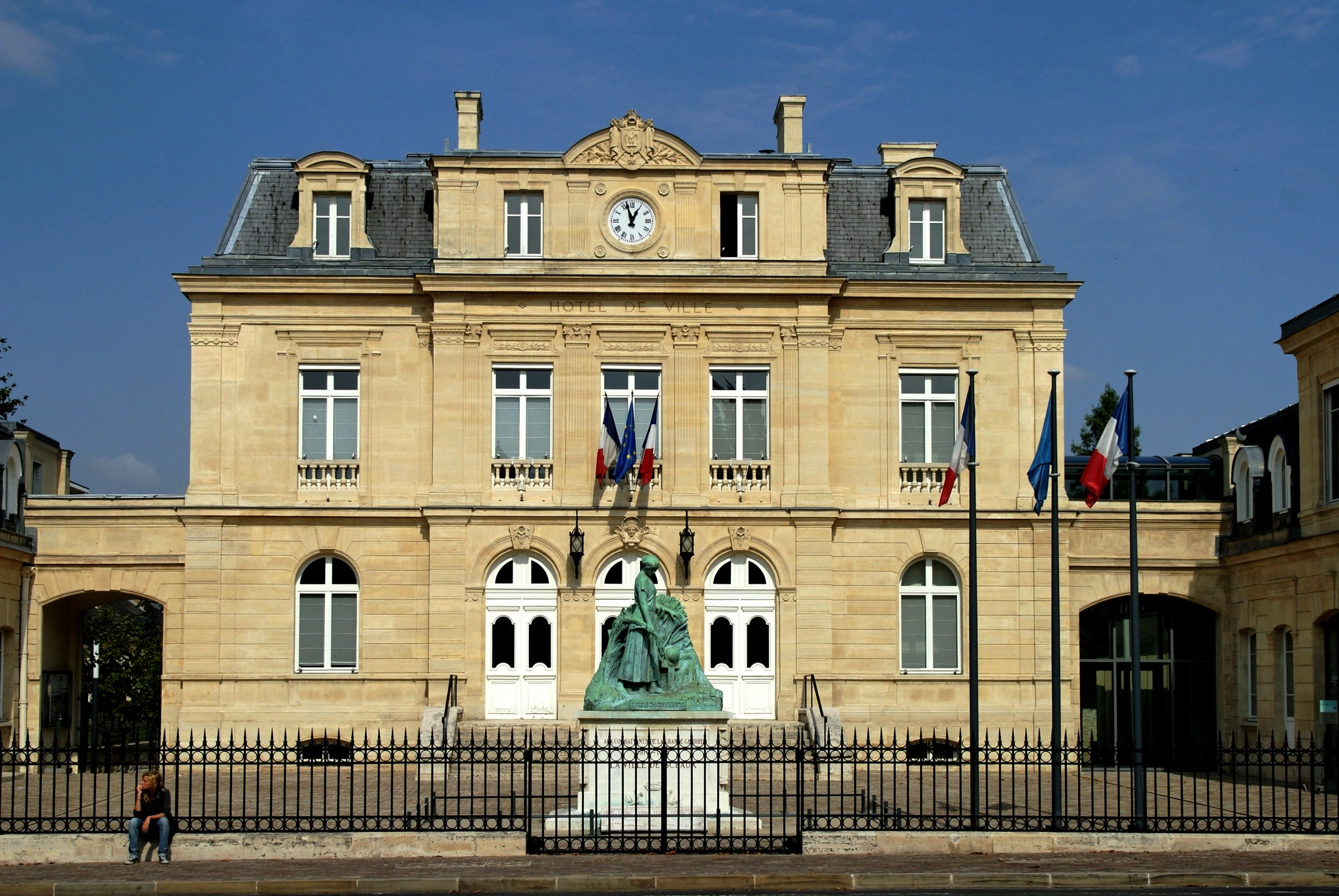
- The main frontage of the Hôtel de Ville in September 2009

General information
- Type: City hall
- Architectural style: Neoclassical style
- Location: Sceaux, France
- Coordinates: 48.7792°N 2.2886°E
- Completed: 1865

Design and construction
- Architect: Claude Naissant

The Hôtel de Ville (French pronunciation: [otɛl də vil], City Hall) is a municipal building in Sceaux, Hauts-de-Seine, in the southwestern suburbs of Paris, standing on Rue Houdan. It has been included on the Inventaire général des monuments by the French Ministry of Culture since 1992.

== History ==
=== The old town hall ===
The old town hall

Following the French Revolution, the new town council initially met in the house of the mayor at the time. This arrangement continued until the early 1840s, when the council led by the mayor, Jean-Baptiste Vandermarcq, decided to commission a dedicated town hall. The site they selected was on the north side of what is now Rue Houdan on the opposite corner to the Church of Saint-Jean-Baptiste. The new building was designed by Claude Naissant in the neoclassical style, built in ashlar stone and was completed in 1843.

The design involved a symmetrical main frontage of five bays facing onto the street. The central bay featured round-headed opening with an archivolt and a keystone which was projected forward to form a porch. There was a French door with a triangular pediment and a balustraded balcony on the first floor. The other bays were fenestrated by round-headed windows with voussoirs and keystones on the ground floor, and by casement windows with triangular pediments on the first floor. The central bay was flanked by pilasters supporting a modillioned cornice, and there was a parapet above the central bay. There were also pilasters at the corners of the building.

Internally, the principal room was the Salle des Fêtes (ballroom), which accommodated seating for about 150 people. After the building was no longer required for municipal use, it became the home of the justice of the peace court and, later, became the home of various ancillary council services. The ballroom was made available for exhibitions and community events.

=== The current town hall ===
In 1887, the council led by the mayor, Michel Charaire, decided to acquire a more substantial municipal building. The property they selected was the former sub-prefecture building 600 metres (2,000 ft) to the west of the old town hall along what is now Rue Houdan. Construction of the building had started in 1863. It had also been designed by Claude Naissant in the neoclassical style and had also been built in ashlar stone, but had been completed in 1865.

The design involved a symmetrical main frontage of five bays facing onto the street. The central section of three bays, which was slightly projected forward, featured three round-headed doorways with moulded surrounds and keystones on the ground floor. There were three cross-windows with balustrades and cornices on the second floor, and a clock with a segmental pediment flanked by two more cross-windows on the second floor. The outer bays were fenestrated by round-headed windows with voussoirs and keystones on the ground floor, by cross-windows with balustrades and cornices on the first floor, and by dormer windows at attic level. All five bays were flanked by Doric order pilasters supporting an entablature. The property served as a sub-prefecture building until 1881, when it became a higher teacher training college for girls. This lasted until 1886 when it became vacant before being acquired by the council the following year.

The scientist, Maria Skłodowska, married Pierre Curie in the town hall on 26 July 1895: they carried out research into radiation together and shared the Nobel Prize in Physics in 1903.

A war memorial, in the form of a statue of a female figure standing over the grave of a soldier, which was intended to commemorate the lives of local service personnel who had died in the First World War, was created by the sculptor, Maxime Real del Sarte, and installed in front of the new town hall on 27 July 1921. On 19 August 1944, during the Second World War, two German policemen burst into the town hall and seized hostages who were then incarcerated in the Castel de Bellechasse. They were not released until the official liberation of the town by the French 2nd Armoured Division, commanded by General Philippe Leclerc, on 25 August 1944.
