= Notre-Dame de la Gare =

Coordinates: 48°49′47″N 2°22′06″E

- Église Notre-Dame-de-la-Gare de Paris
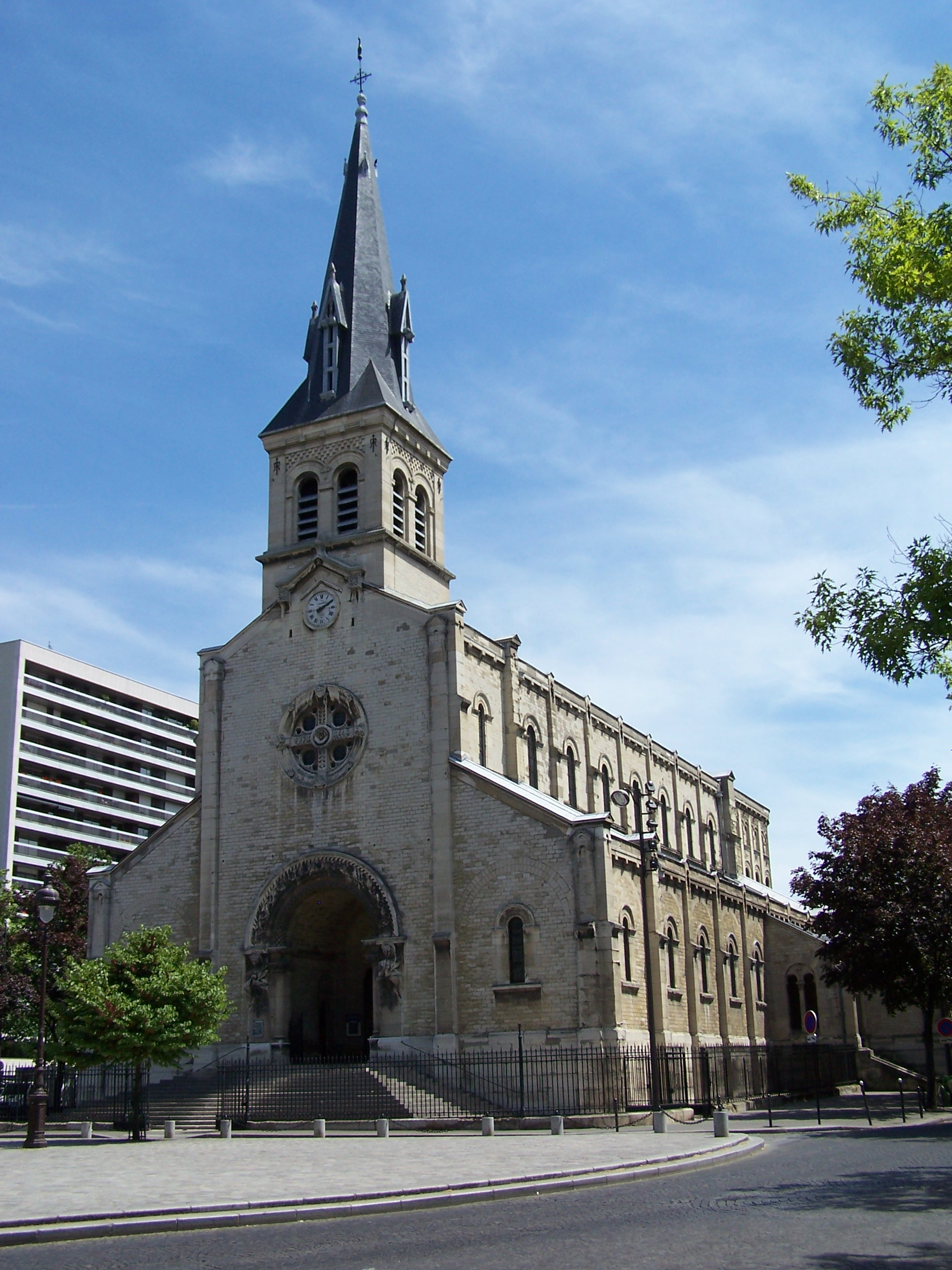
- Notre-Dame de la Gare
- Location: Place Jeanne-d'Arc, 13th arrondissement, Paris
- Country: France
- Denomination: Roman Catholic

History
- Status: Parish church

Architecture
- Architect: Claude Naissant
- Style: Neo-Romanesque
- Completed: 1864

Notre-Dame de la Gare (French: Église Notre-Dame-de-la-Gare de Paris) is a Roman Catholic parish church located on Place Jeanne-d'Arc in the 13th arrondissement of Paris, France. It was built between 1855 and 1864 in an area of Paris which was rapidly industrializing, and was located near the major freight railway station, or "Gare", which gave the church its name. The style was inspired by Romanesque architecture.

== History ==
The church was created to serve the very large and growing working-class population in the neighborhood of the 13th arrondissement just north of Ivry, where the major railway station for shipping freight in and out of Paris was located. The parish included large factories for making glass, oil refineries, and later, automobile factories.

The church was part of campaign of building new churches in the fast-growing neighborhoods carried out by Emperor Napoleon III during the French Second Empire. The new church was designed by architect Claude Naissant (1801-1879), and was built between 1855 and 1864. The architecture was Romanesque Revival, a popular style for new churches built during the Second Empire. As the population continued growing, the church became too small, and a second church, Saint-Jean-des-Deux-Moulins, was built a few streets away.

== Exterior ==
The exterior follows the typical plan of 12th century Romanesque churches in the late 12th century; a high central structure flanked by two lower lateral aisles and a high square bell tower topped by a fleche, or spire.

The portal is also typical of the Romanesque style; a rounded arch over the doorway, decorated with floral sculpture and figures of angels on each side of the doorway. The oculus, or round window over the portal, has a modest amount of floral decoration.

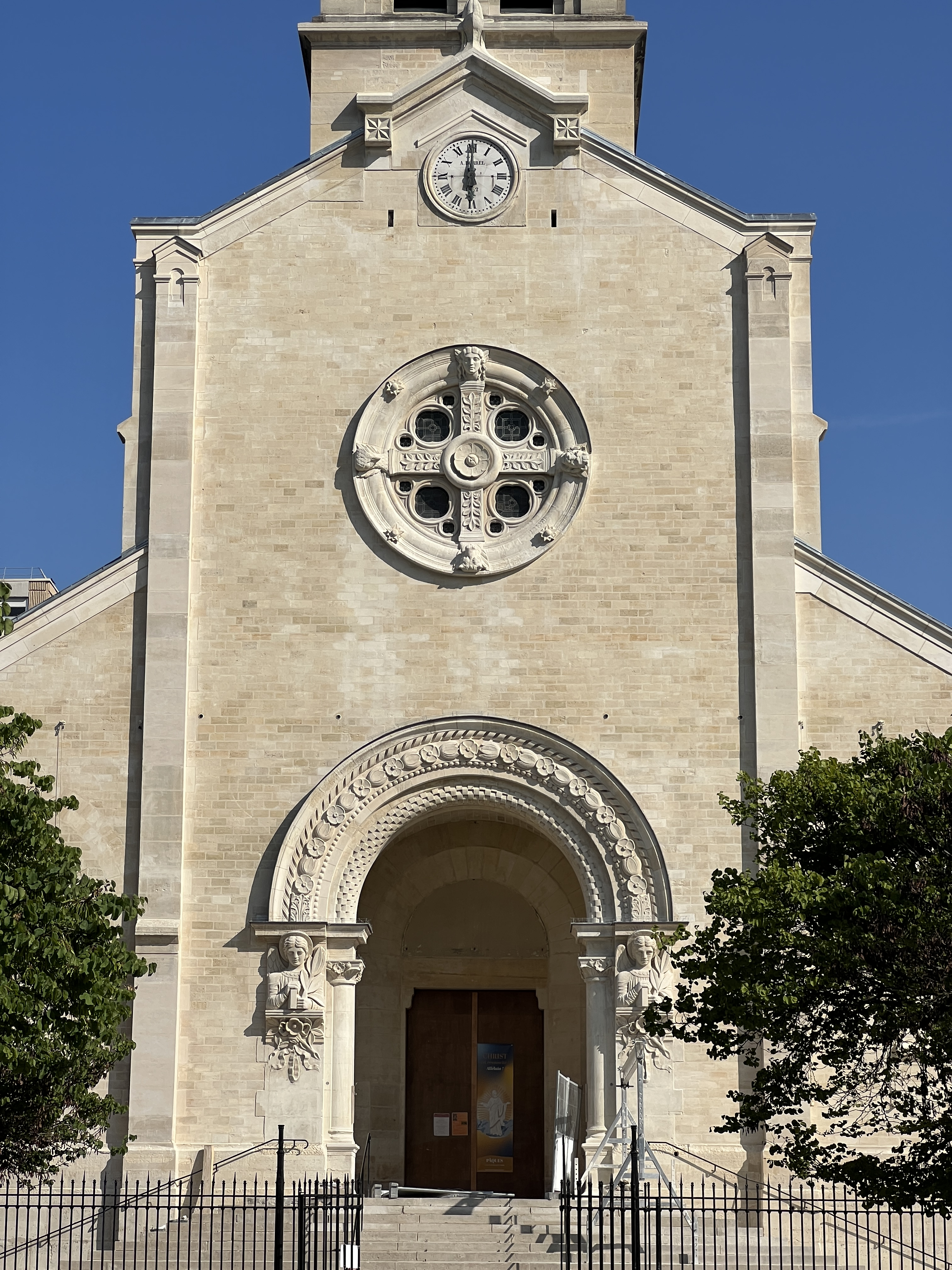
The portal

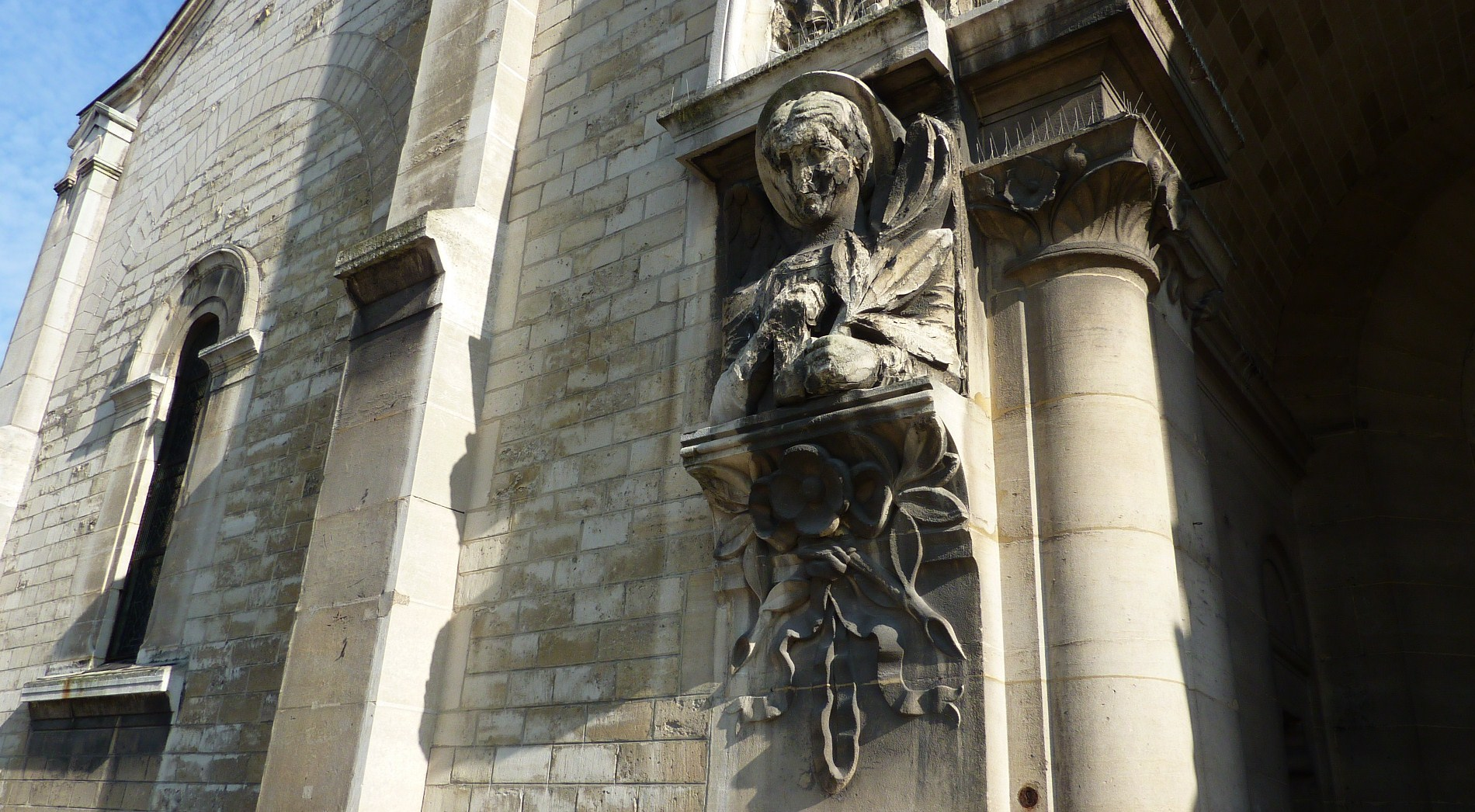
Sculpture of an angel by the portal

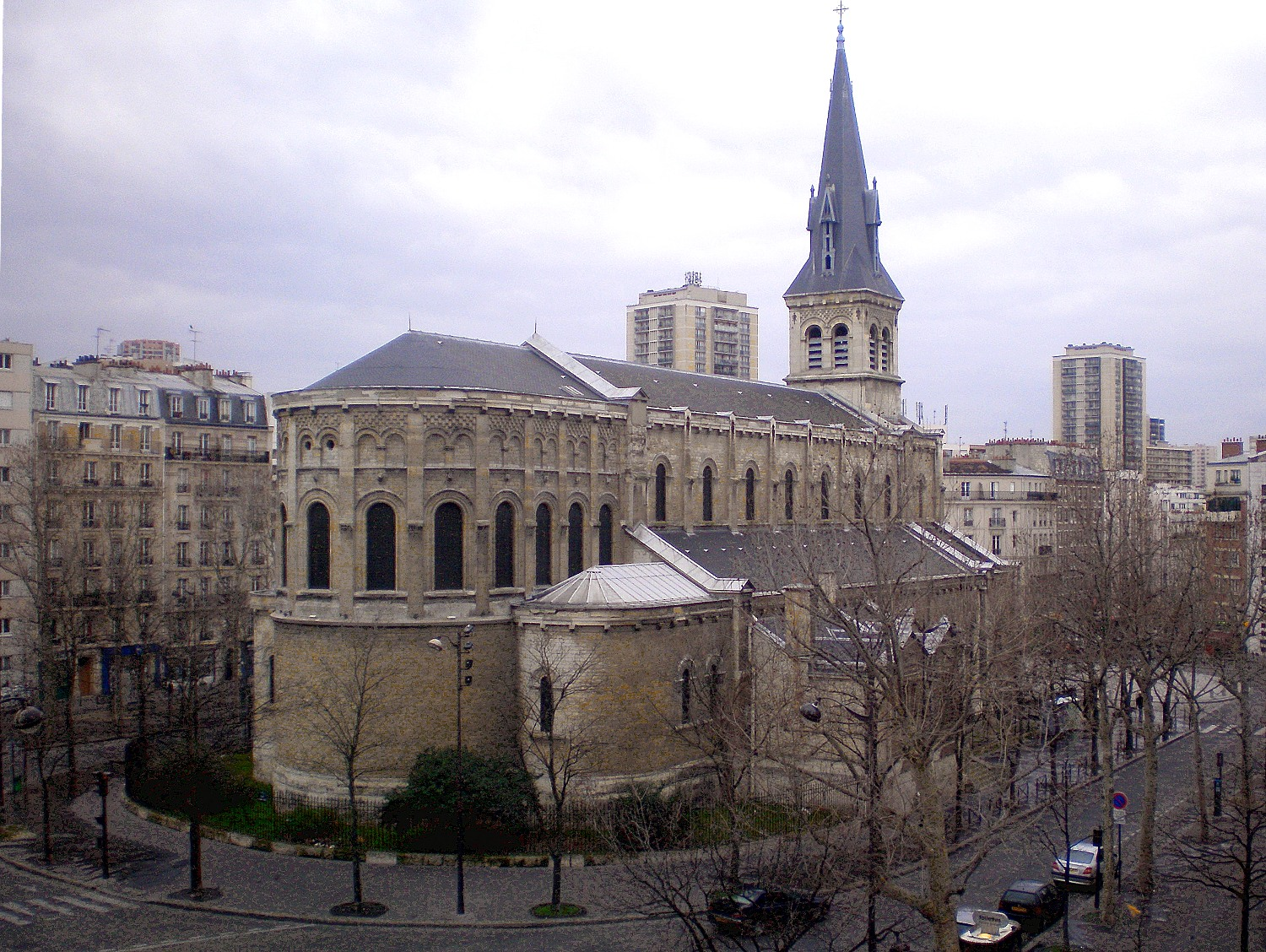
View of the chevet

== Interior ==
=== Nave ===
The nave is very austere, with very little decoration, other than sculpted plaques along the outer aisles. The interior follows the traditional plan of a high nave with two lower side aisles, separated from the nave by arcades of columns with rounded arches. On the lowest level, the nave has a small window in each vault. The nave has small windows in each vault. Above the arcades on either side is a triforium level, a passageway without windows on the outside, and above that are rows of narrow windows reaching up to the ceiling vaults. All the windows are relatively small, and without electric lighting the interior of the church would be very dim.

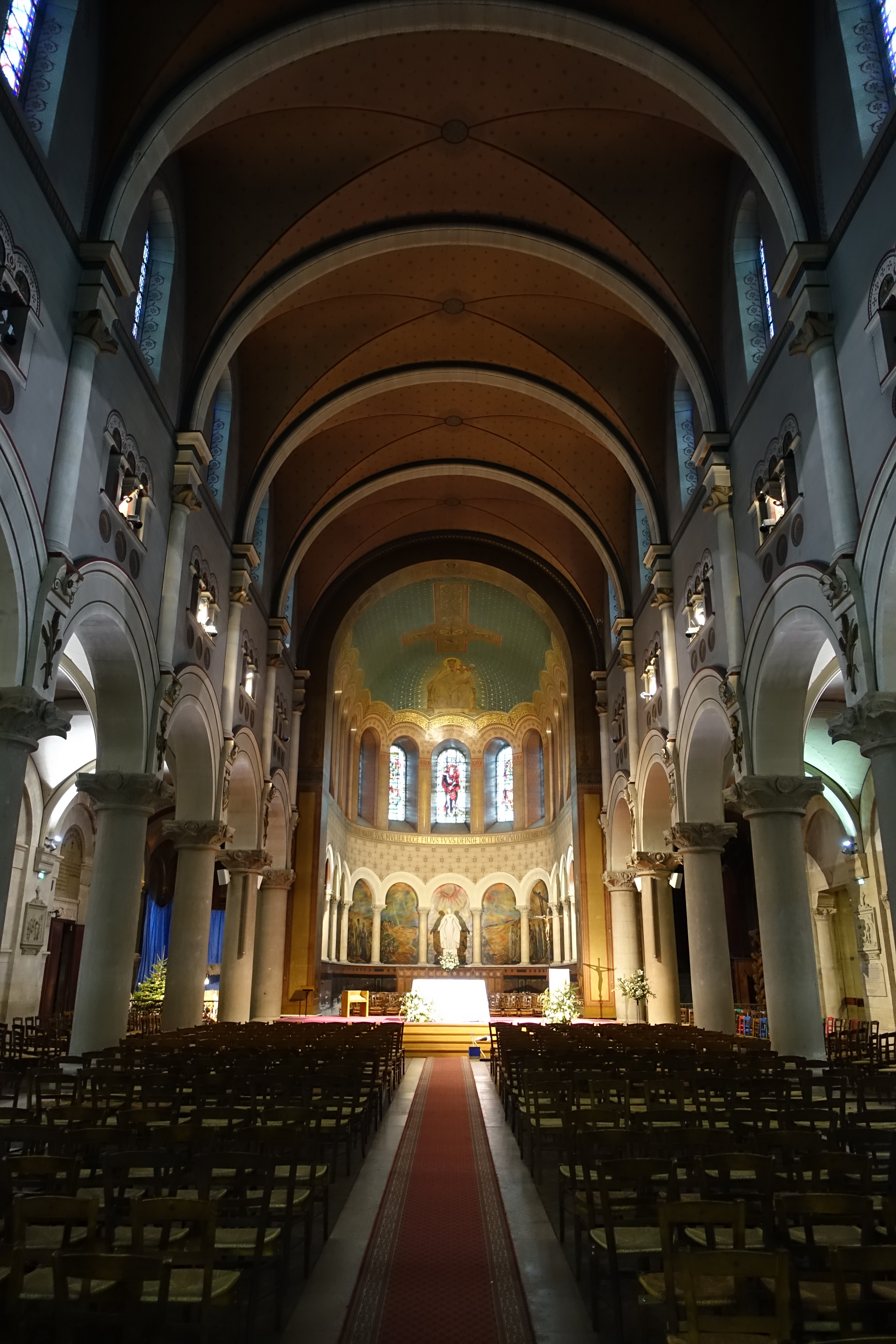
The choir seen from the nave

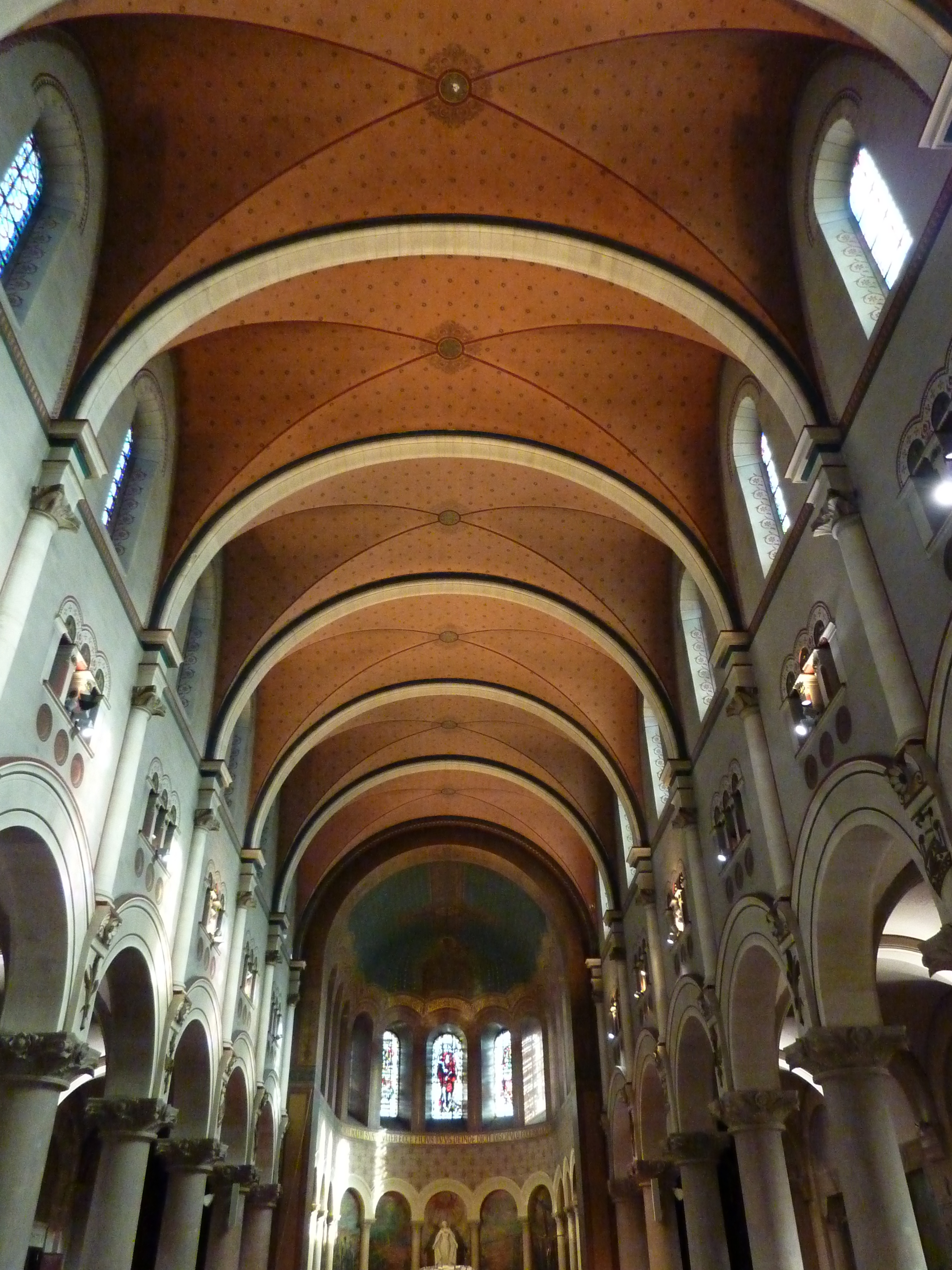
Vaults of the nave

=== Choir ===
The choir makes up for the dimness of the nave. There the windows are larger, and the walls are entirely covered with paintings and decoration. The half-cupola over the altar is decorated with a painting "The Virgin and the Infant Jesus" by Felix-Jobbé Duval (1821-1889), while the rest of the choir has colorful decorative paintings by Anders Osterlind behind the statue of the Virgin, including a large canvas behind the altar of Christ converting water to wine at the Feast of Canae. and of the Crucifixion of Christ.

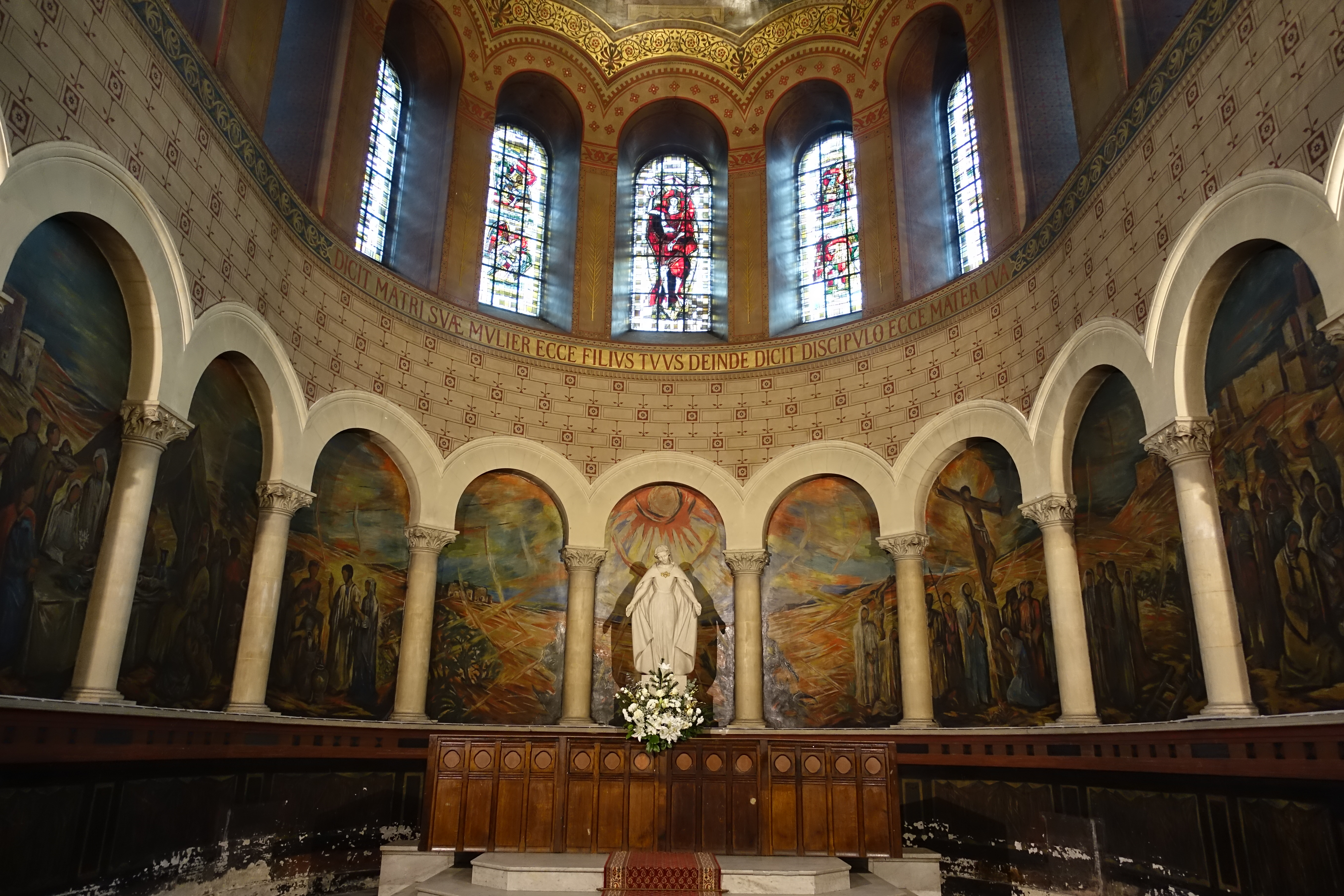
THe Choir, with mural of the miracle of Cana, with Christ converting water to wine

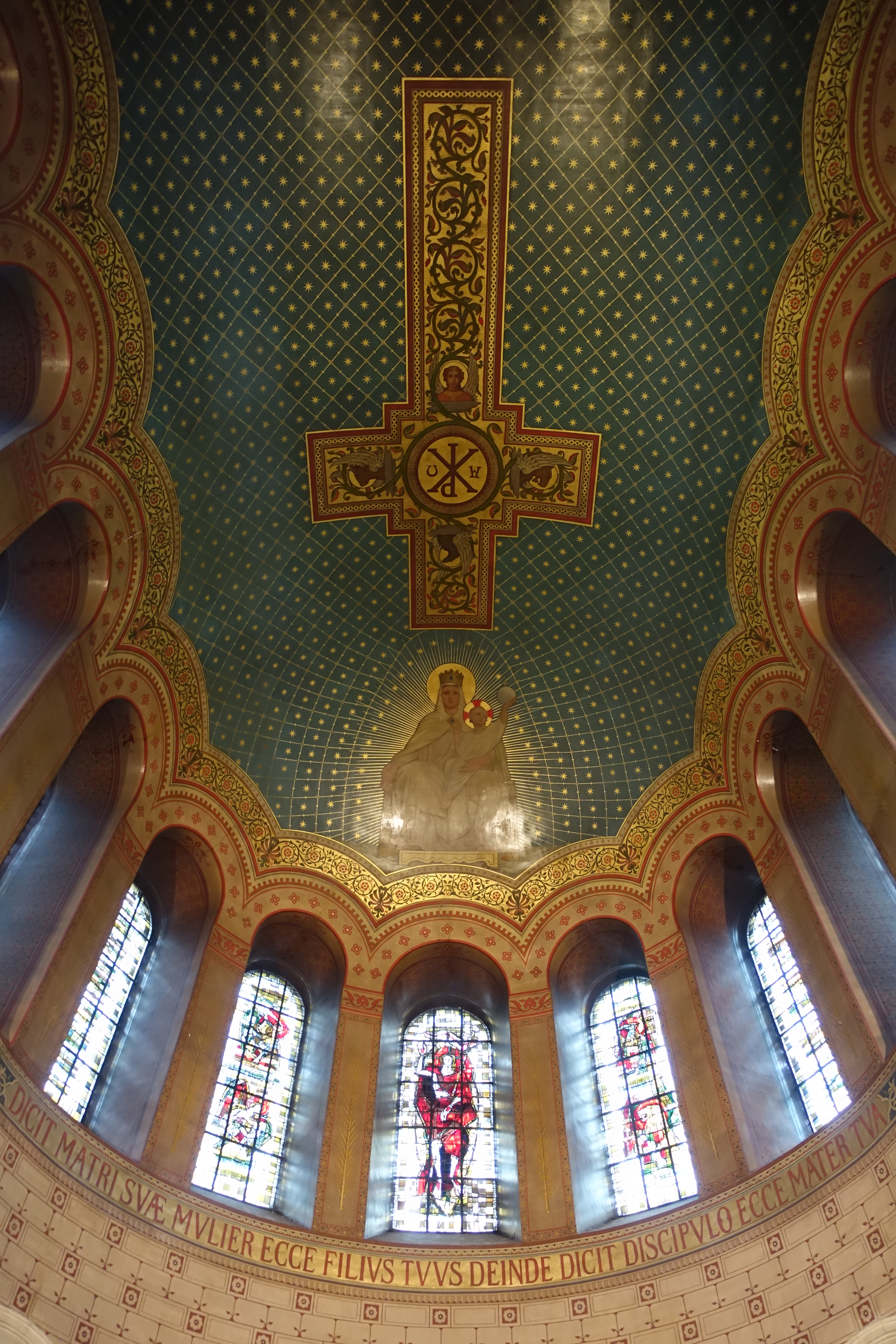
Half-dome over the altar, showing half-dome over apse with painting "The Virgin and the Infant Jesus"

== Art and decoration ==
The church has works of art representing the sculpture of period. Most are found behind the altar, and in the small chapels alongside and behind the choir.

The chapel of the vestibule has a colorful Pieta, illustrating the Virgin Mary with Christ after his Crucifixion. The vestibula also displays a statue of pensive but smiling Joan of Arc.

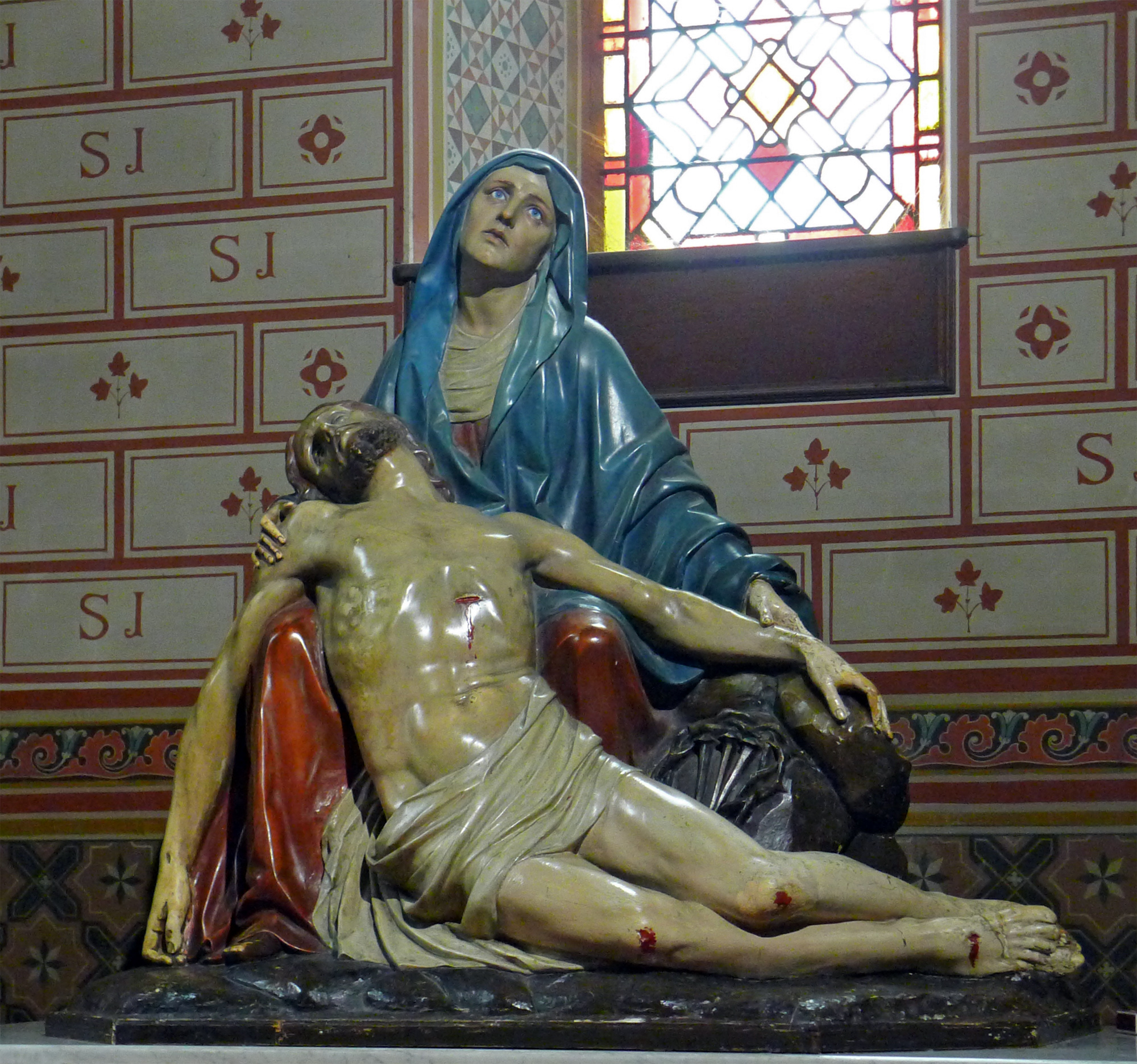
Chapel of the Virgin, with a Pieta

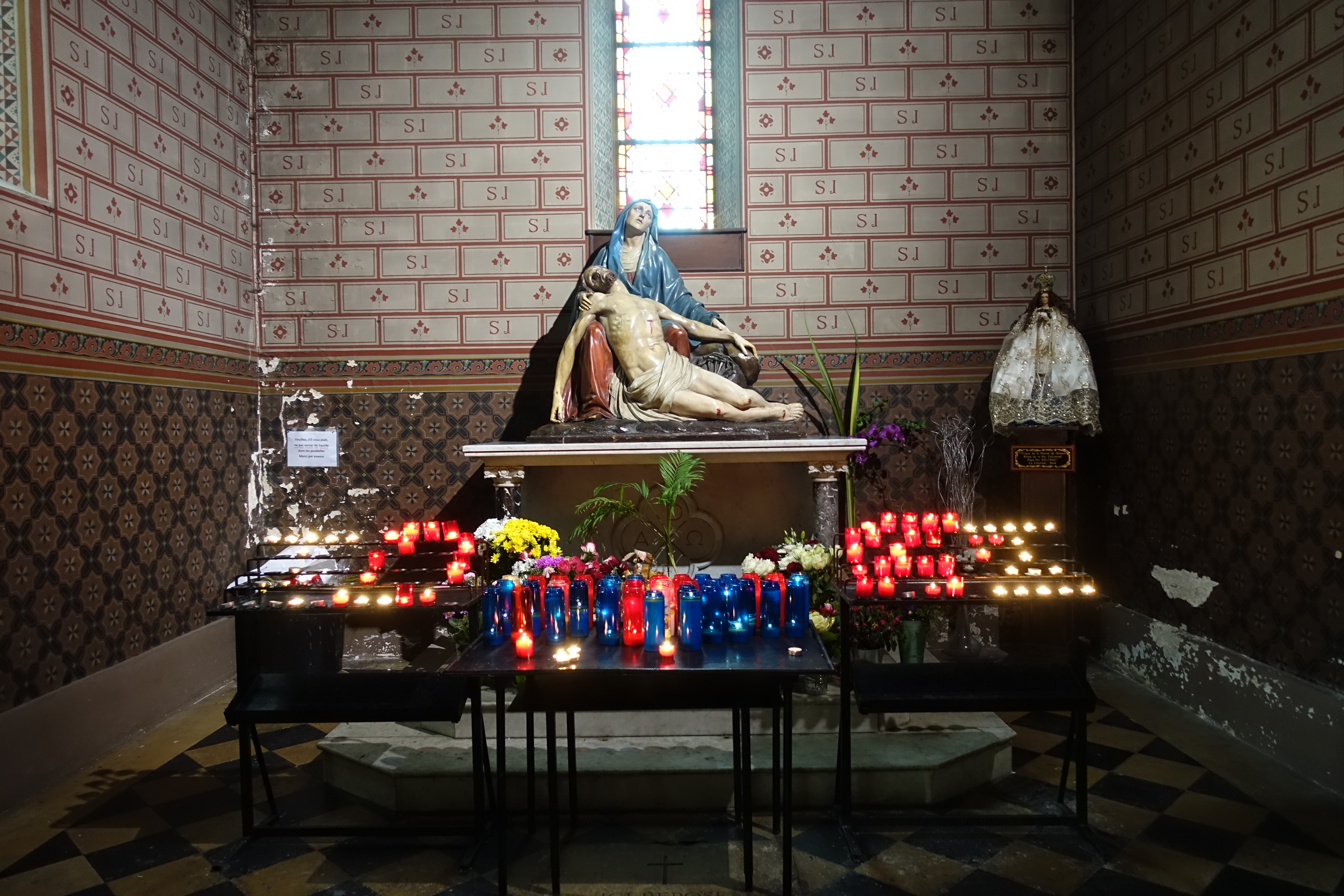
Chapel of the Virgin, with Pieta

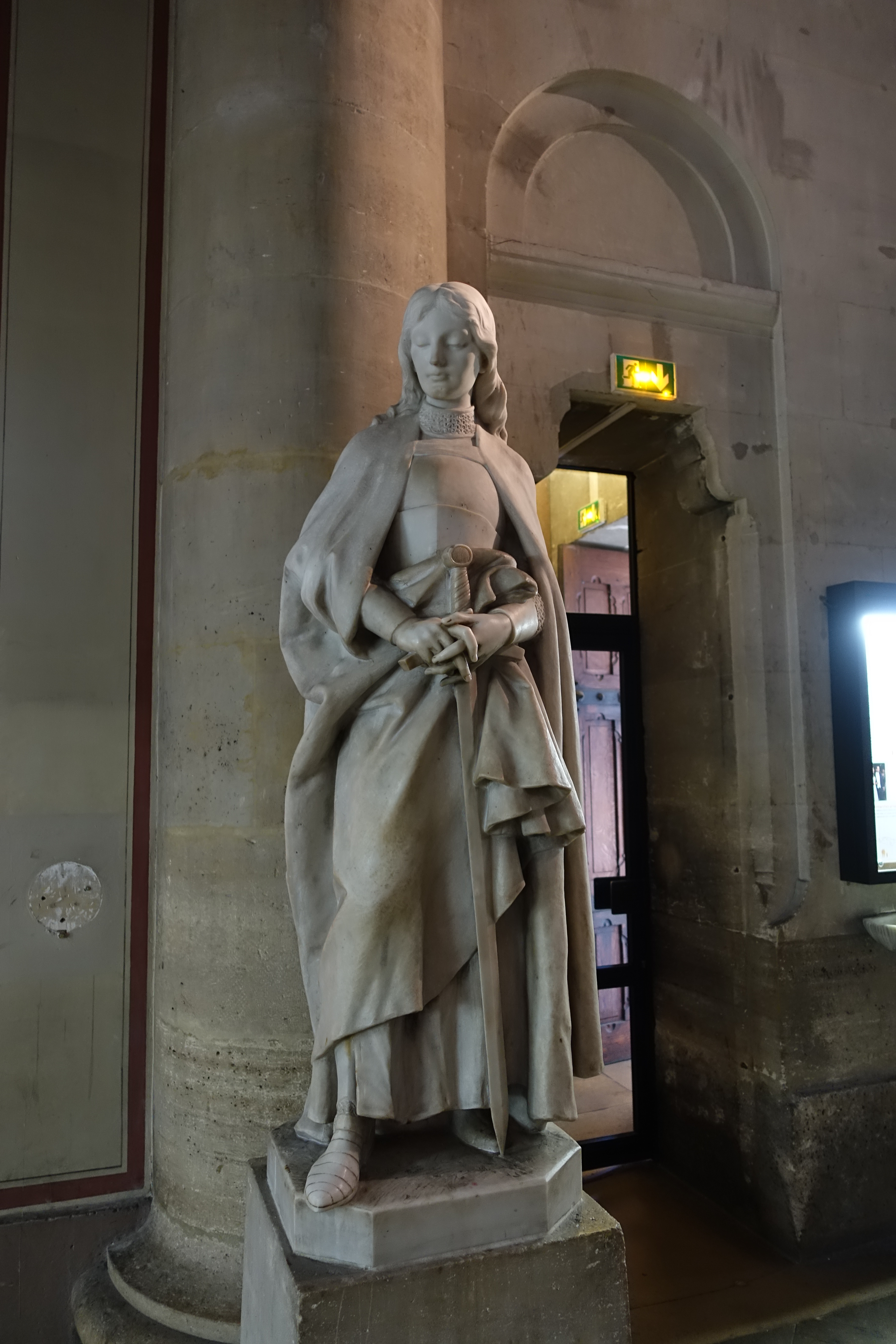
Joan of Arc.

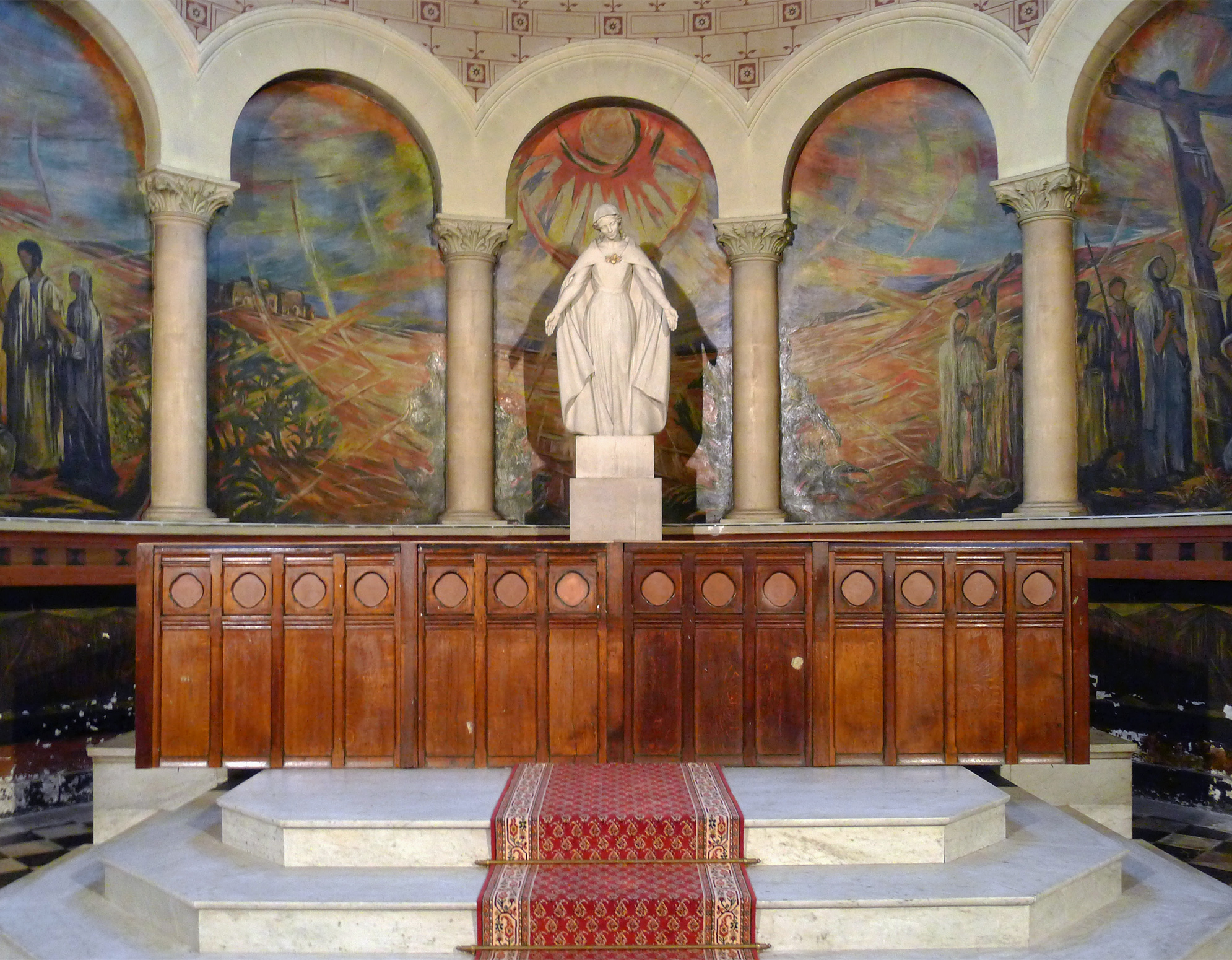
Statue of the Virgin Mary by Henri-Albert-Marie Lagriffoul, in the Choir in front of the "Crucifixion" fresco

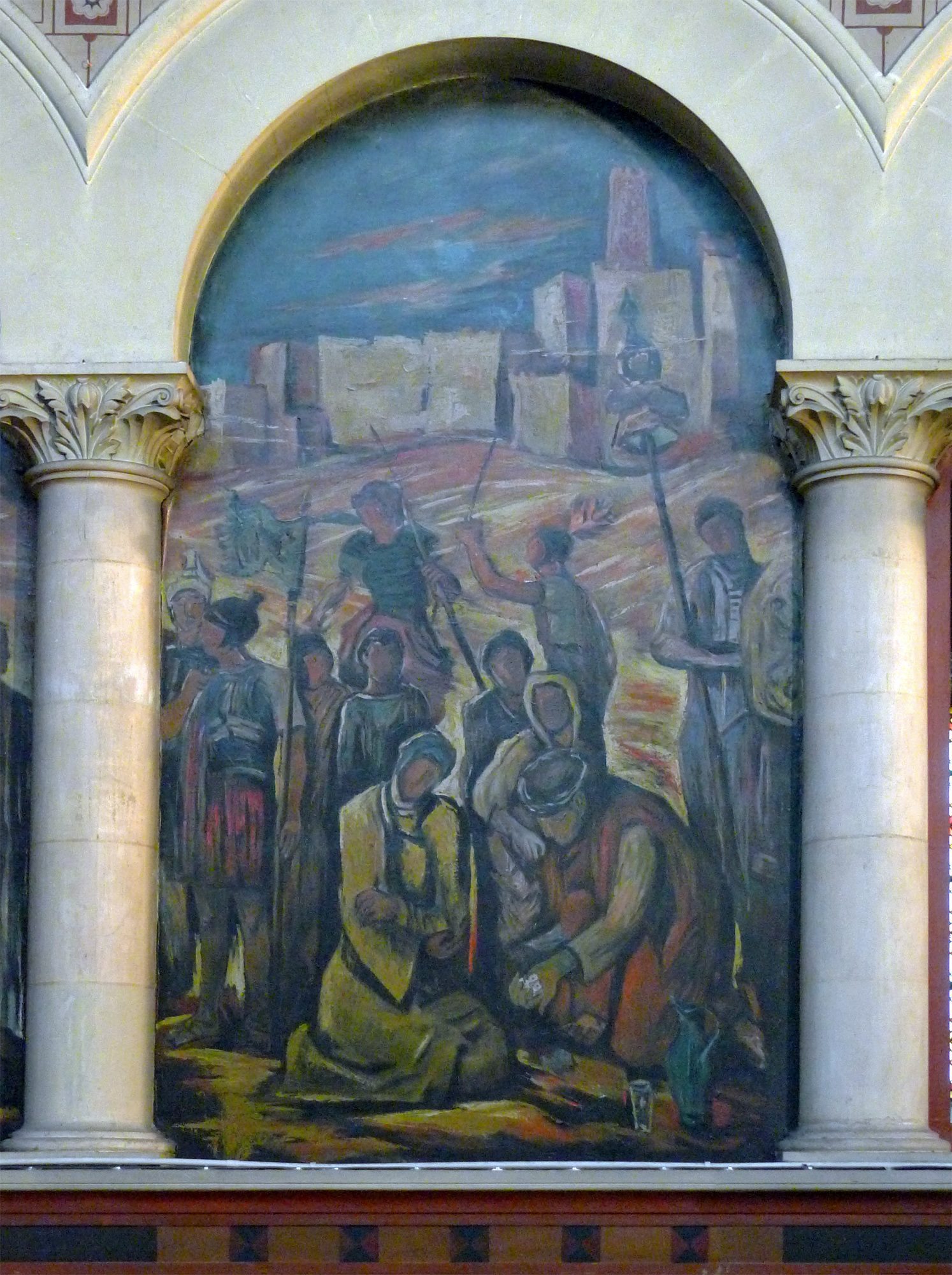
A portion of the fresco "fhe Crucifixion", by Anders Osterland (1887-1960), behind the choir

== Stained glass ==
The church is noted for its exceptional collection of 20th century stained glass, The group of three windows in the apse, over the altar, were made by Jacques de Chevalier (1896-1978). THe left window illustrates the Apostles; the Bull, the symbol of aint Luke and the figure of Saint Matthew. The right windows shows the eagle of Saint John, and the Lion of Saint Mark. The central window depicts the risen Christ showing his wounds or stigmata on his hand, wrists and feet. Other windows from the 1960s depict the symbols of the Saints and Apostles.

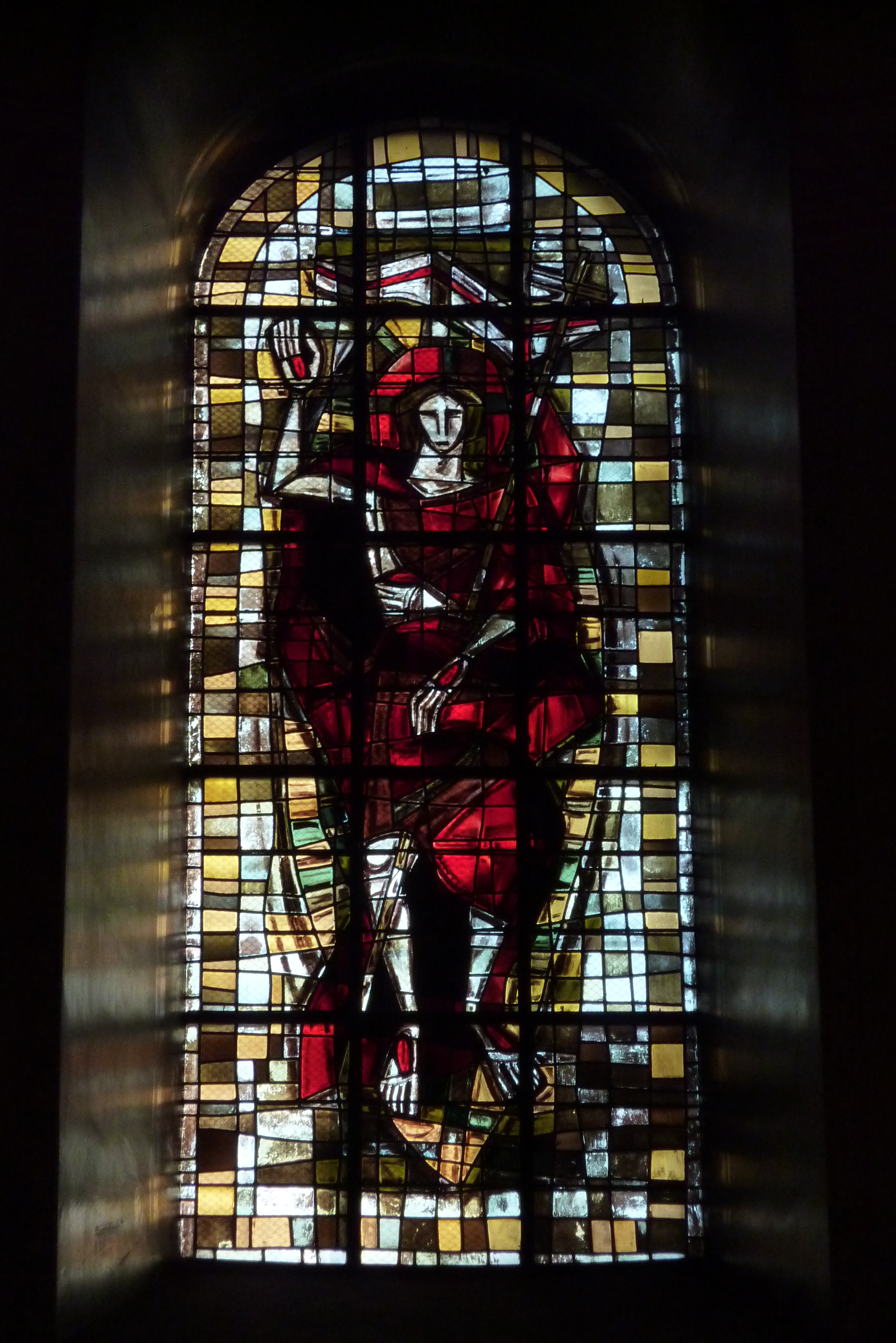
Christ showing his wounds, by Jacques Le Chevalier (apse)

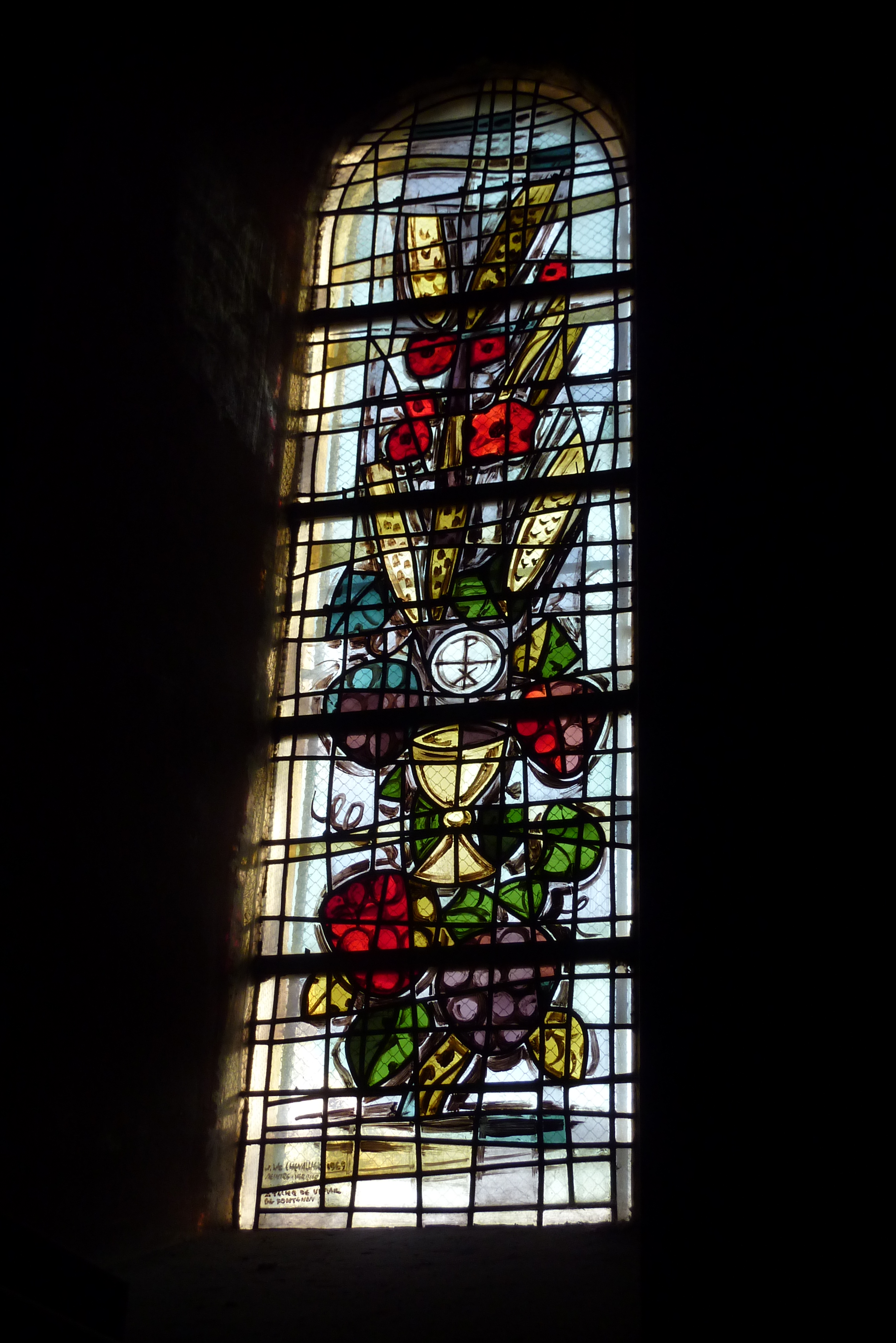
Emblems of the saints

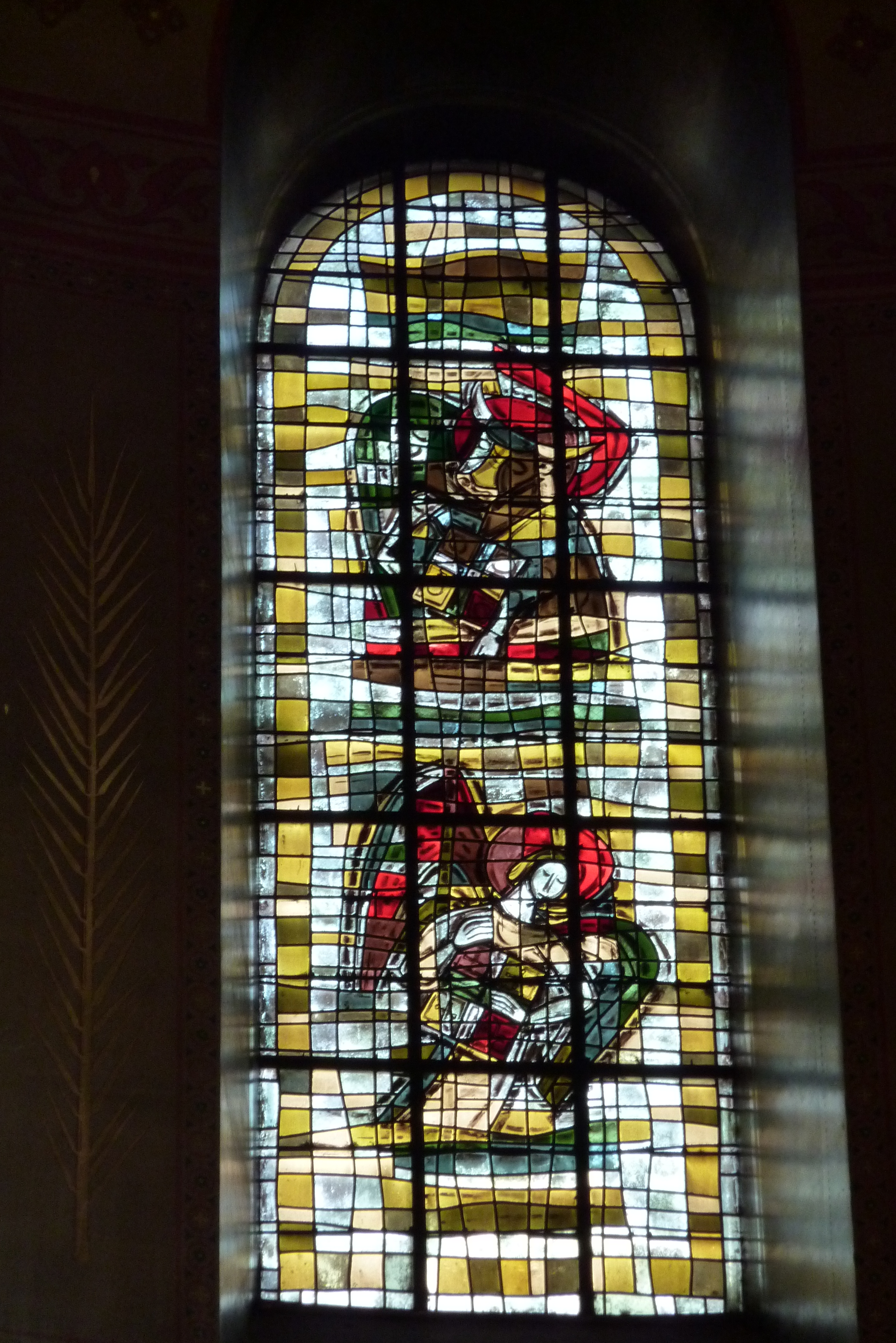
Angels (Choir)

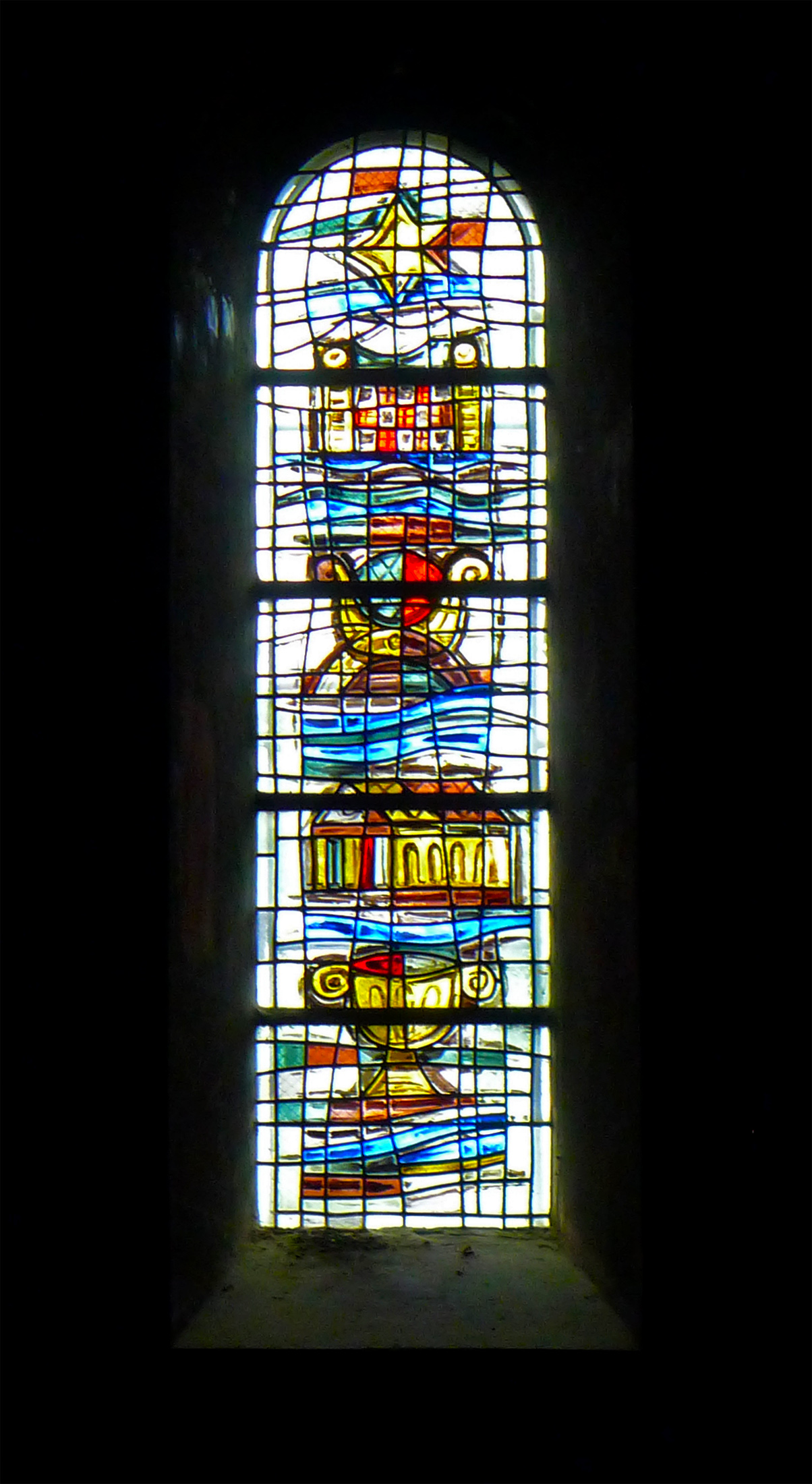
"Litanies of the Virgin" (choir)

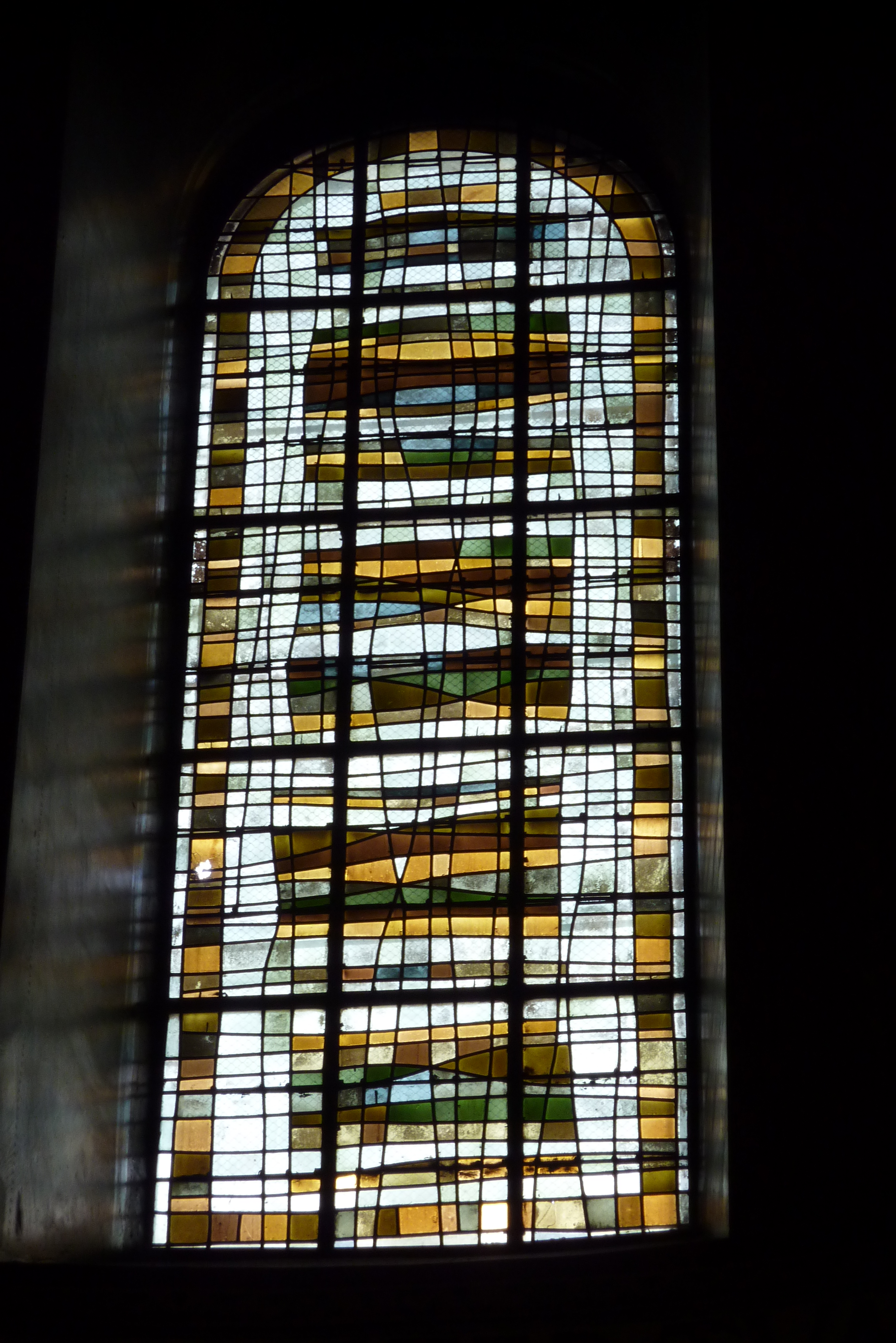
Abstract window

== Organs ==
The grand organ of the church is located in the tribune over the portal at the entrance to the nave. The instrument was built by the firm of Aristide Cavaillé-Coll. It was installed in 1863 or 1864, and was restored in 1928 and 1984. It has 24 stops, two keyboards of 56 notes, and pedals to play thirty notes. The instrument was classified as an object of historical importance in 1989.

The church has a smaller organ located in the choir. This instrument was built in 1860, and has four stops. a keyboard with fifty-four notes, and pedals to play an additional eighteen notes.

.

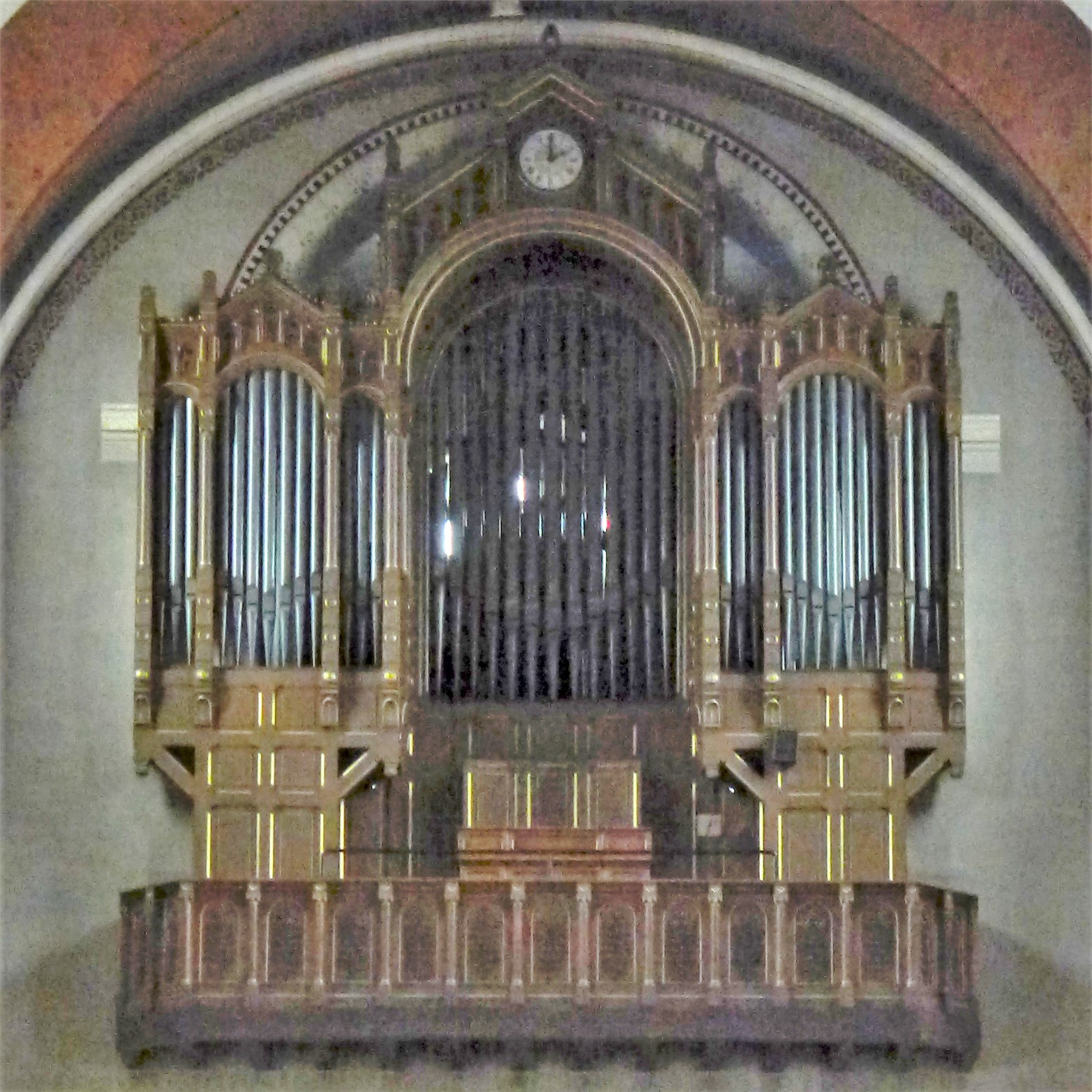
The grand organ in the tribune
