= Claude Naissant =

French architect (1801–1882)

Claude Naissant (14 March 1801 – 19 September 1882) was a French architect who was responsible for the design of many public buildings in Paris in the mid-19th century.

== Career ==
Born in Dijon on 14 March 1801, Naissant studied at the École nationale supérieure des beaux-arts in Paris. As the departmental architect of the Department of the Seine between 1848 and 1866, he designed many public buildings. He died in Nanteau-sur-Lunain on 19 September 1882.

== Works ==
Naissant's major works included:

- Hôtel de Ville, Châtillon, 1838
- Hôtel de Ville, Bourg-la-Reine, 1845
- Hôtel de Ville, Villemomble, 1848
- Hôtel de Ville, Joinville-le-Pont, 1851
- Church of Saint-Lambert, Vaugirard, 1853
- Hôtel de Ville, Montrouge, 1855
- Hôtel de Ville, Vanves, 1857
- Hôtel de Ville, Fontenay-aux-Roses, 1860
- Hôtel de Ville, Issy-les-Moulineaux, 1863
- Church of Notre-Dame de la Gare, 1864
- Hôtel de Ville, Saint-Mandé, 1865
- Hôtel de Ville, Sceaux, 1865
- Hôtel de Ville, Rosny-sous-Bois, 1868
