= Lycée Marie Curie =

Lycée Marie-Curie may refer to the following schools named after Marie Curie:

In France:

- lycée Marie-Curie de Sceaux - In Sceaux
- lycée Marie-Curie d'Échirolles - In Échirolles
- lycée Marie-Curie de Marseille - In Marseille
- lycée Marie-Curie de Nogent-sur-Oise - in Nogent-sur-Oise
- lycée Marie-Curie de Strasbourg - in Strasbourg
- lycée Marie-Curie de Tarbes - in Tarbes
- lycée Marie-Curie de Versailles - in Versailles

Outside France:

- Lycée Français Marie Curie de Zurich
- Lycée Marie-Curie d'Hanoï
- Lycée Marie-Curie d'Hô-Chi-Minh-Ville
