= Bourg-la-Reine =

- Commune
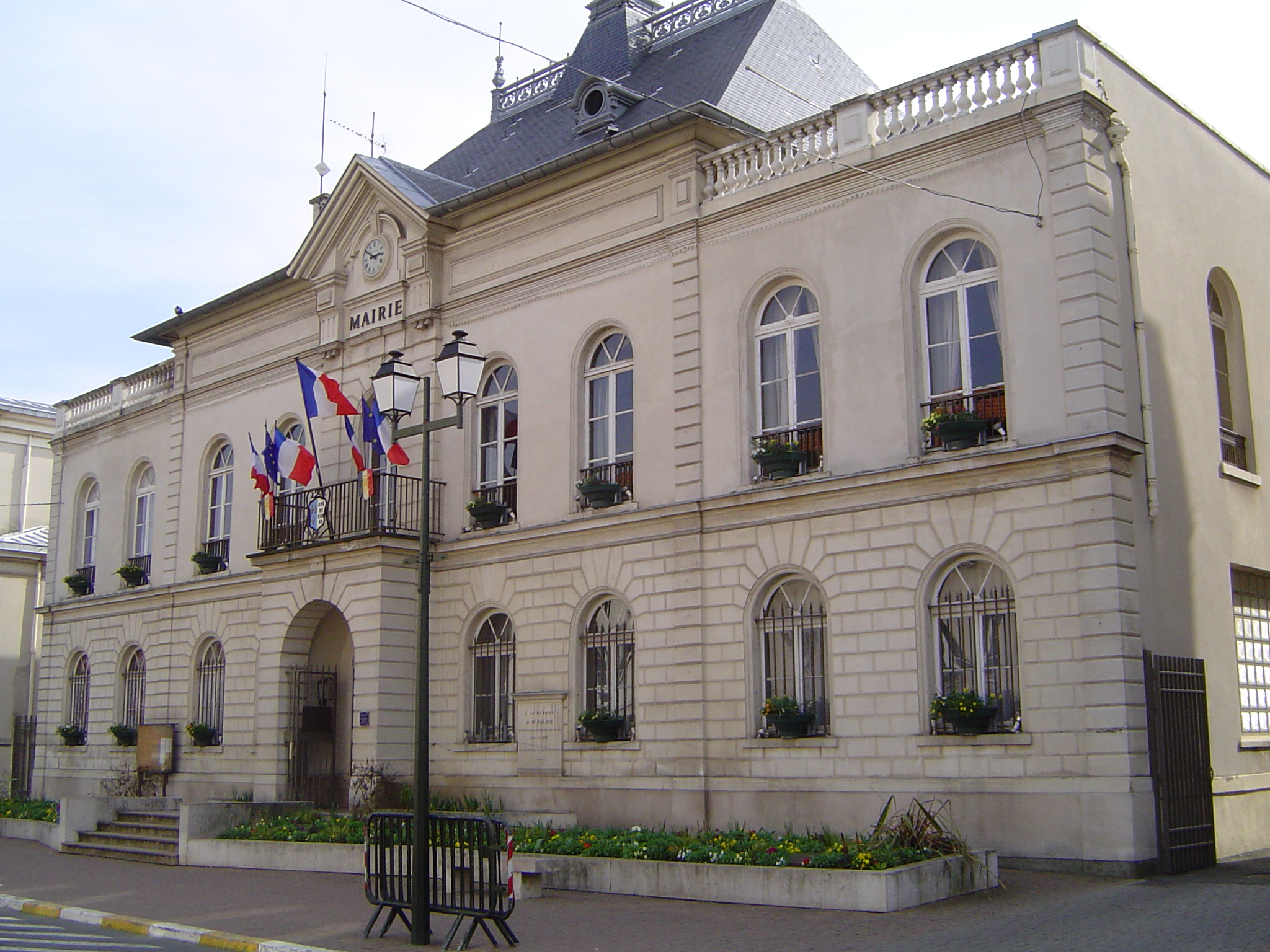
- The Hôtel de Ville

- Coat of arms

- Location (in red) within Paris inner suburbs
- Location of Bourg-la-Reine
- Location within France Location within Île-de-France (region)
- Coordinates: 48°46′47″N 2°18′54″E
- Country: France
- Region: Île-de-France
- Department: Hauts-de-Seine
- Arrondissement: Antony
- Canton: Bagneux
- Intercommunality: Grand Paris

Government
  - Mayor (2026–32): Patrick Donath
- Area^{1}: 1.86 km^{2} (0.72 sq mi)
- Elevation: 48 m (157 ft)
- Population (2023): 21,019
  - Density: 11,300/km^{2} (29,300/sq mi)
- Time zone: UTC+01:00 (CET)
  - Summer (DST): UTC+02:00 (CEST)
- INSEE/Postal code: 92014 /92340
- ^{1} French Land Register data, which excludes lakes, ponds, glaciers > 1 km^{2} (0.386 sq mi or 247 acres) and river estuaries.

Bourg-la-Reine (French pronunciation: [buʁ la ʁɛn]) is a commune in the southern suburbs of Paris, France. It is located 9.1 km (5.7 mi) from the center of Paris.

== History ==
In 1792, during the French Revolution, Bourg-la-Reine (meaning "Town of the Queen") was renamed Bourg-l'Égalité (meaning "Equality borough"). The name Bourg-la-Reine was restored in 1812. The Hôtel de Ville was completed in 1845.

== Population ==
The inhabitants are called Réginaburgiens in French.

Historical population

Year	Pop.	±% p.a.
1793	749	—
1800	719	−0.58%
1806	822	+2.26%
1821	658	−1.47%
1831	992	+4.19%
1836	1,076	+1.64%
1841	1,435	+5.93%
1846	1,482	+0.65%
1851	1,484	+0.03%
1856	1,676	+2.46%
1861	1,920	+2.76%
1866	2,269	+3.40%
1872	2,186	−0.62%
1876	2,523	+3.65%
1881	2,741	+1.67%
1886	2,954	+1.51%
1891	3,009	+0.37%
1896	3,649	+3.93%
1901	4,181	+2.76%

Year	Pop.	±% p.a.
1906	4,537	+1.65%
1911	5,011	+2.01%
1921	6,038	+1.88%
1926	7,346	+4.00%
1931	8,946	+4.02%
1936	9,838	+1.92%
1946	10,244	+0.41%
1954	11,708	+1.68%
1962	17,694	+5.30%
1968	18,711	+0.94%
1975	18,221	−0.38%
1982	18,070	−0.12%
1990	18,499	+0.29%
1999	18,251	−0.15%
2007	19,615	+0.91%
2012	19,872	+0.26%
2017	20,667	+0.79%
2023	21,019	+0.28%

Source: EHESS and INSEE (1968-2023)

== Transport ==
Bourg-la-Reine is served by Bourg-la-Reine station on Paris RER line B.

== Education ==
Public schools in the commune include:

- Preschools: École de la Fontaine-Grelot, École Etienne-Thieulin-la-Faïencerie, École des Bas-Coquarts
- Elementary schools: École République, École Etienne-Thieulin-la-Faïencerie, École Pierre-Loti
- Collège Évariste Galois

Nearby public senior high schools:

- In Cachan: Lycée Maximilien Sorre
- In Châtenay-Malabry: Lycée Jean Jaurès
- In Sceaux: Lycée Lakanal, Lycée Marie Curie, Lycée d’enseignement professionnel Florian

Private schools in the commune:

- Institut Notre Dame – preschool through senior high school

There are nearby institutes of higher education in Paris, Châtenay-Malabry, and Sceaux.

== Twinning ==
The town is twinned with:

- Kenilworth, UK (since 1982)
- Yanqing, China (1998)
- Reghin, Romania (1999)
- Monheim am Rhein, Germany (2000)

== Personalities ==
Bourg-la-Reine was the birthplace of:

- Évariste Galois (1811–1832), mathematician
- Henri Couillaud (1878–1955), French classical trombonist
- Louis Joxe (1901–1991), statesman
- Modibo Diakité, footballer
- Yannick N'Gog, rugby player
- Claire Nebout, actress
- Melvin Raffin, athlete
- Anthony Turgis, cyclist
- Marquis de Condorcet (1743–1794) died in the city's prison during the French Revolution and is buried in the city's cemetery.
- Alain Delon (1935-2024), actor, singer, filmmaker, and businessman, grew up in the city
- Pierre-Adrien Dalpayrat (1844–1910), ceramicist, spent the last twenty years of his life there. His home is now a museum exhibiting 120 original works.

== Gallery ==
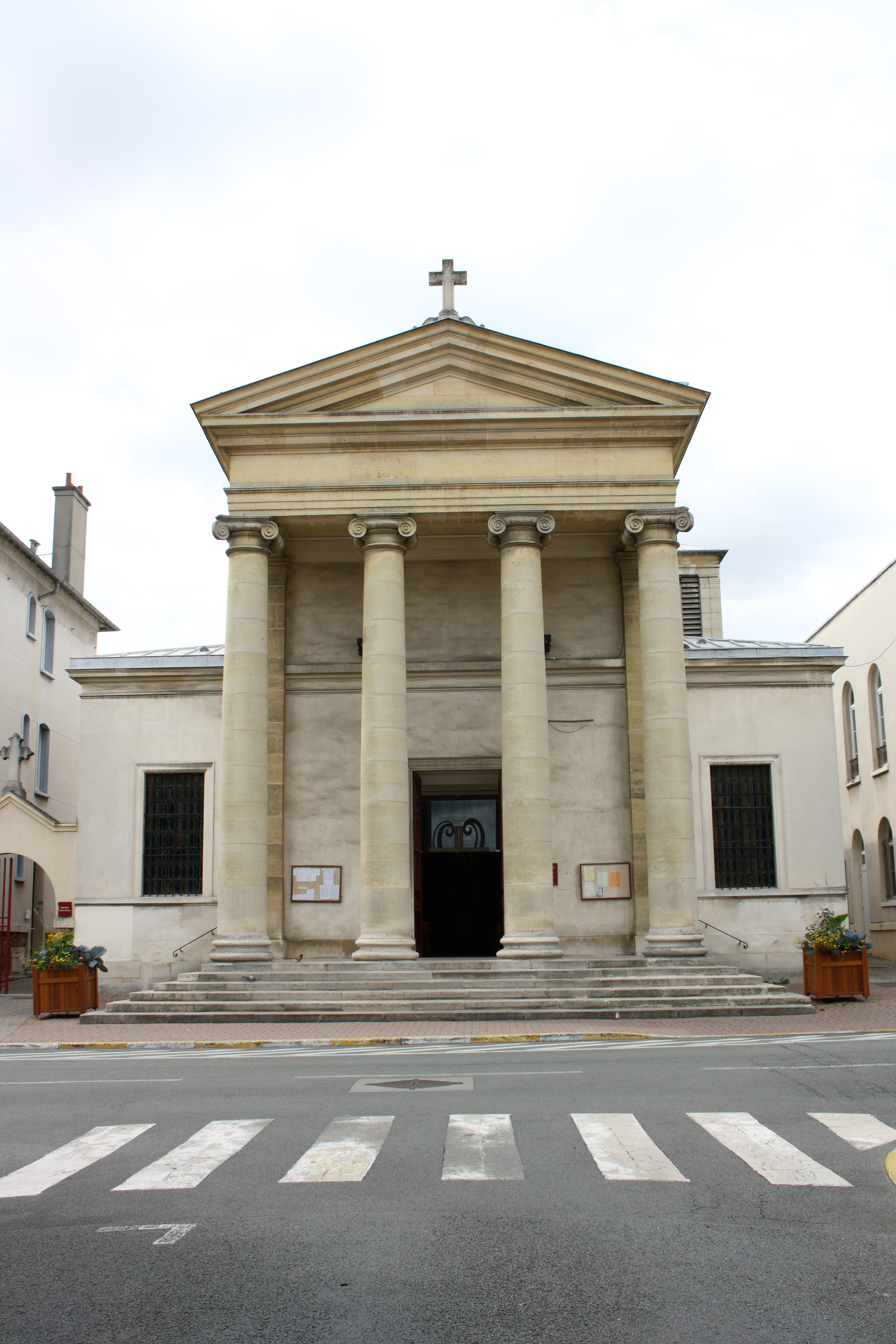
Église Saint-Gilles.

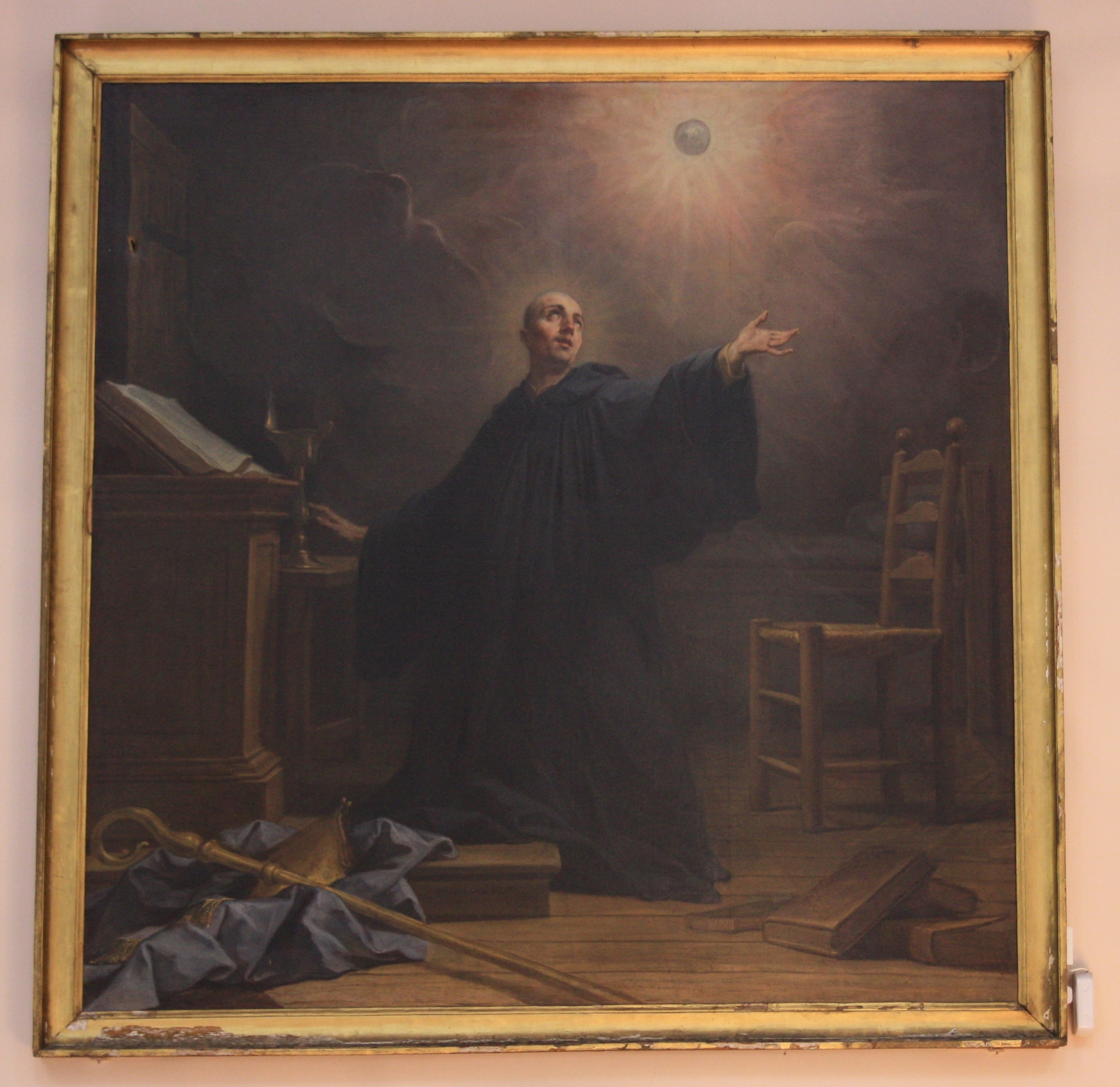
Extase de Saint Benoît, 1746 by Jean II Restout. Painting inside of church Saint-Gilles in Bourg-la-Reine.

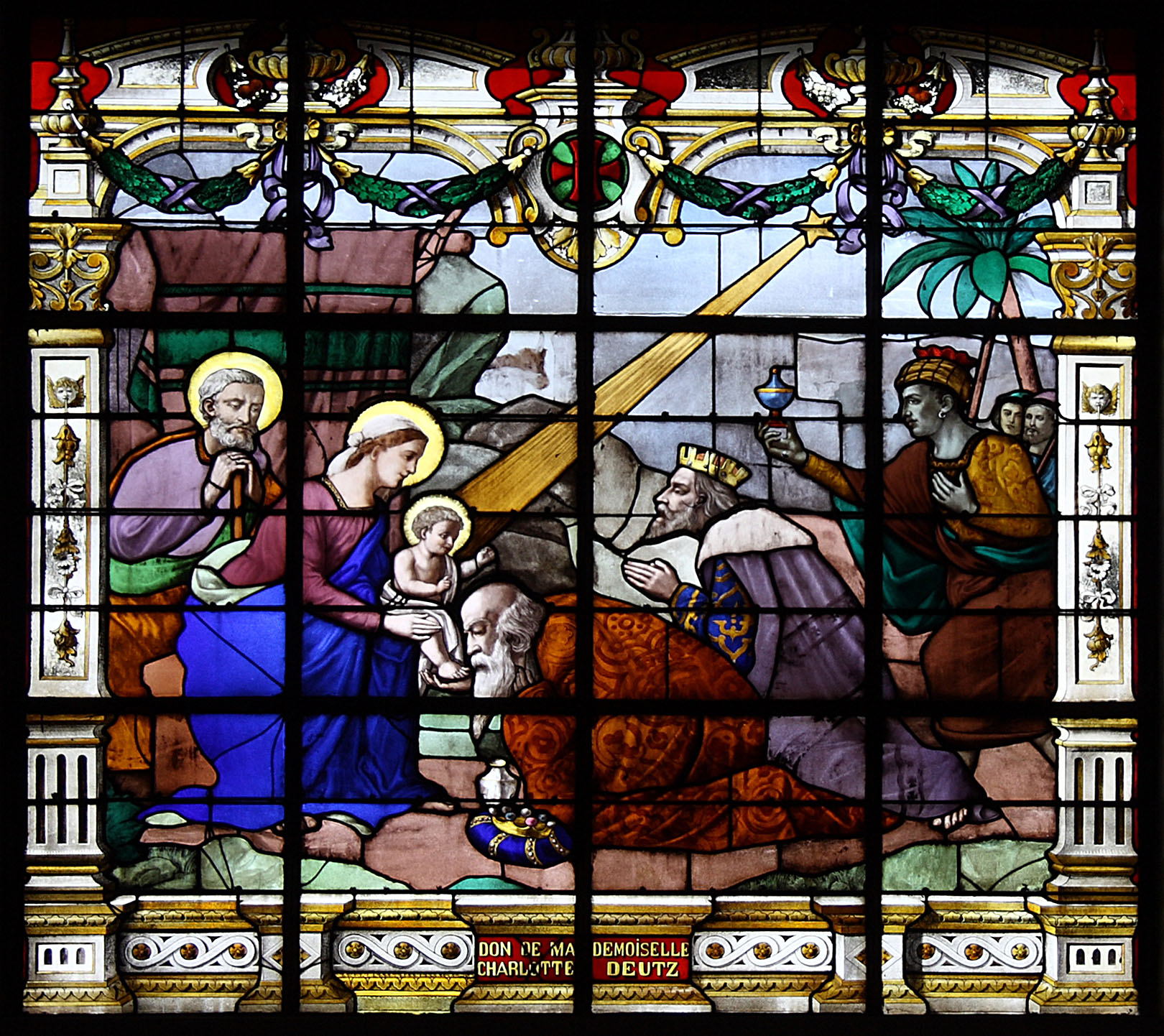
The three kings at the church Saint-Gilles.

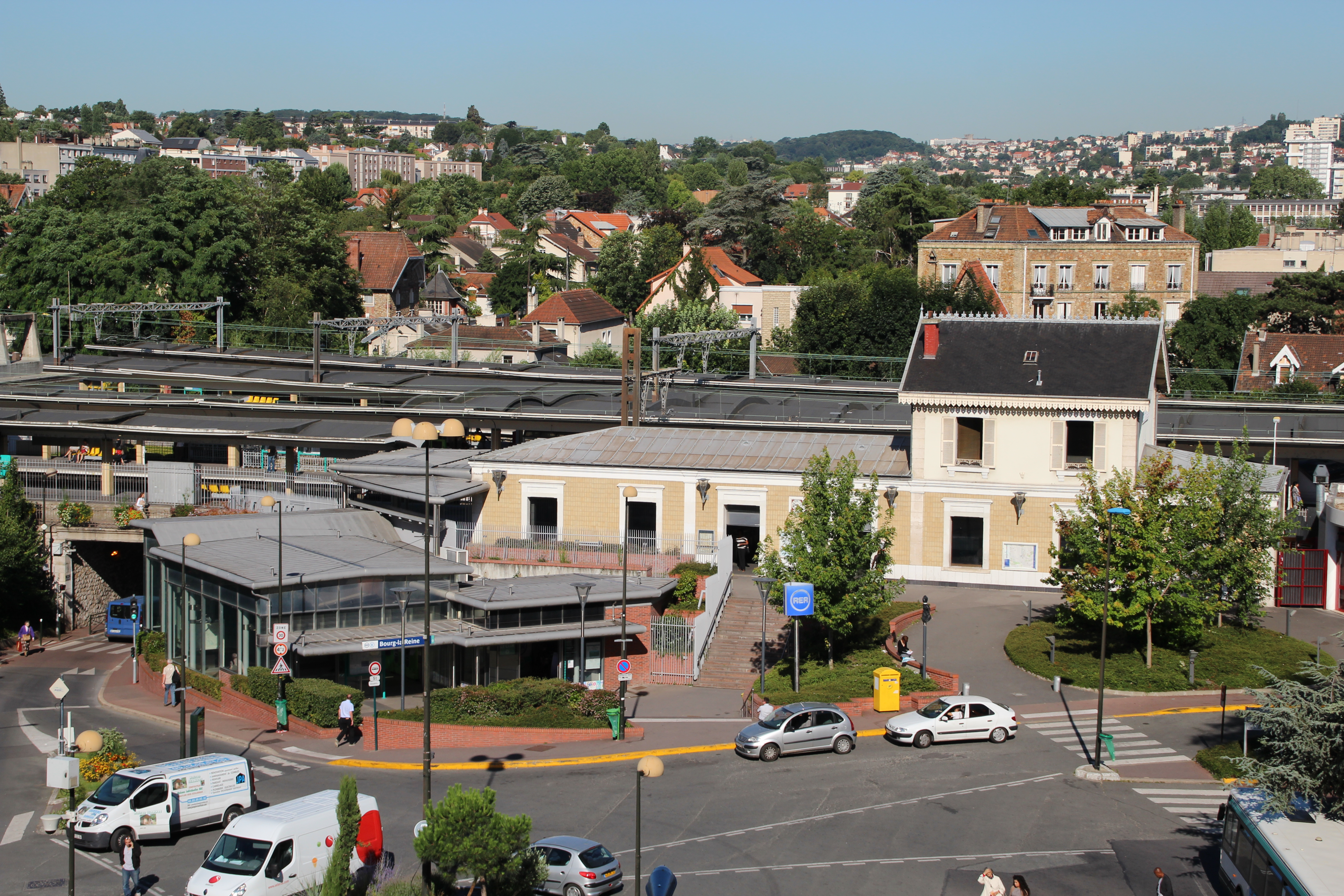
RER Bourg-la-Reine.

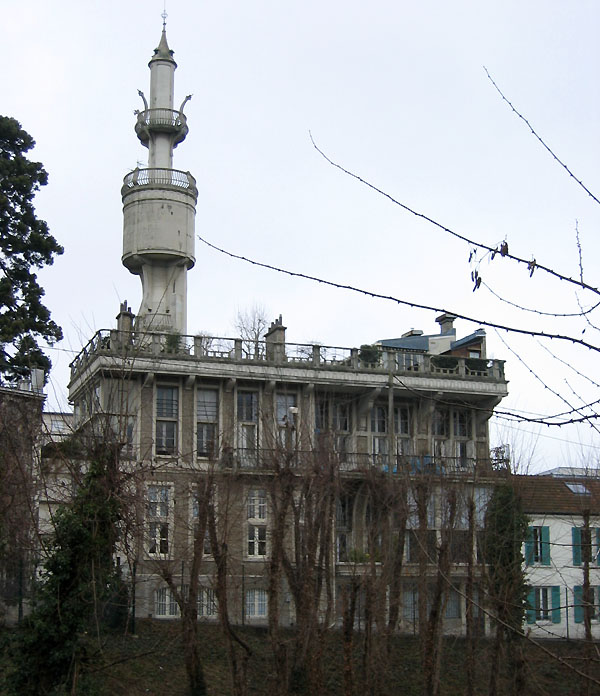
Villa Hennebique (1901-1903).

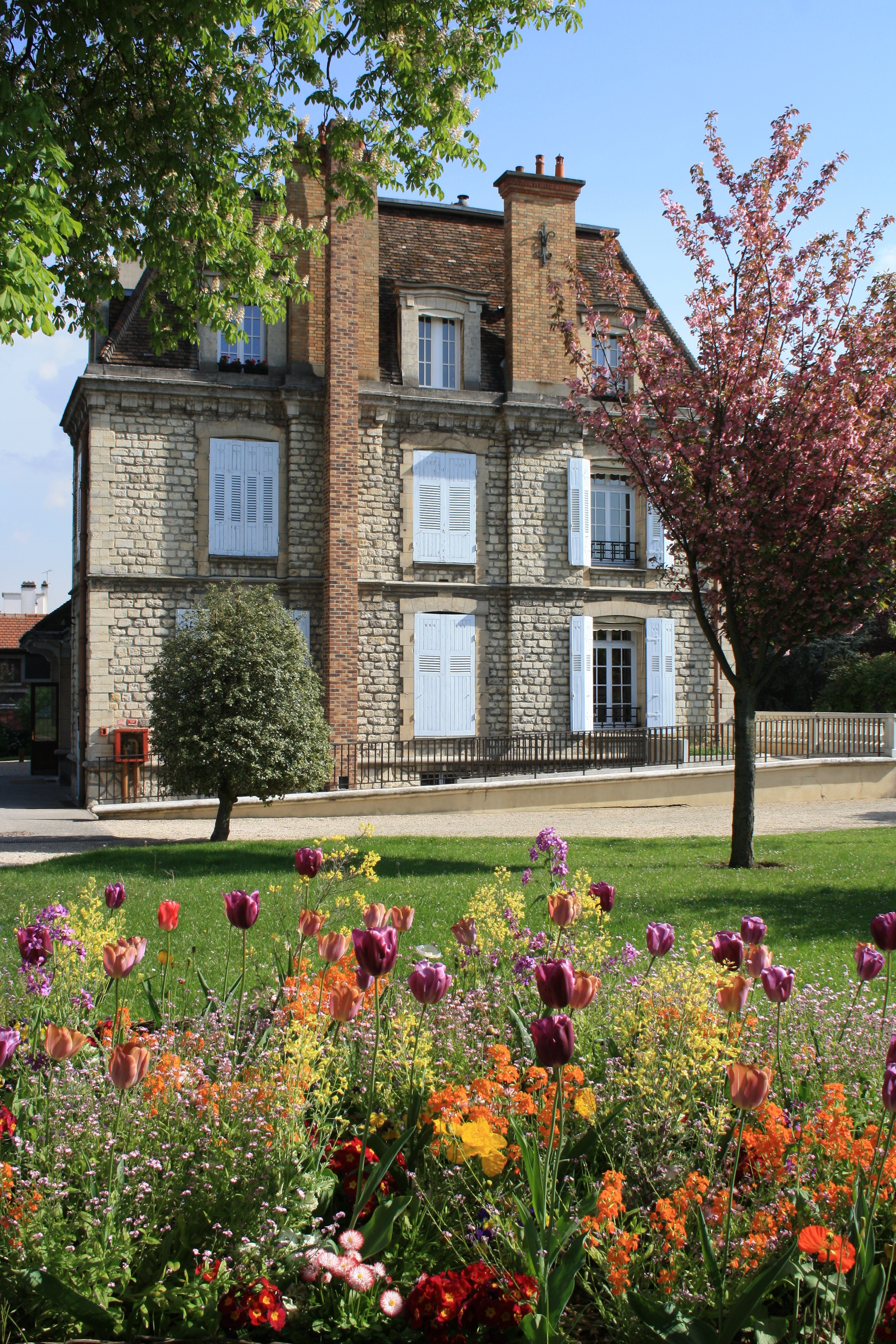
Villa Saint Cyr.

== See also ==
- Communes of the Hauts-de-Seine department
