= Hôtel de Ville, Bourg-la-Reine =

Town hall in Bourg-la-Reine, France

Hôtel de Ville
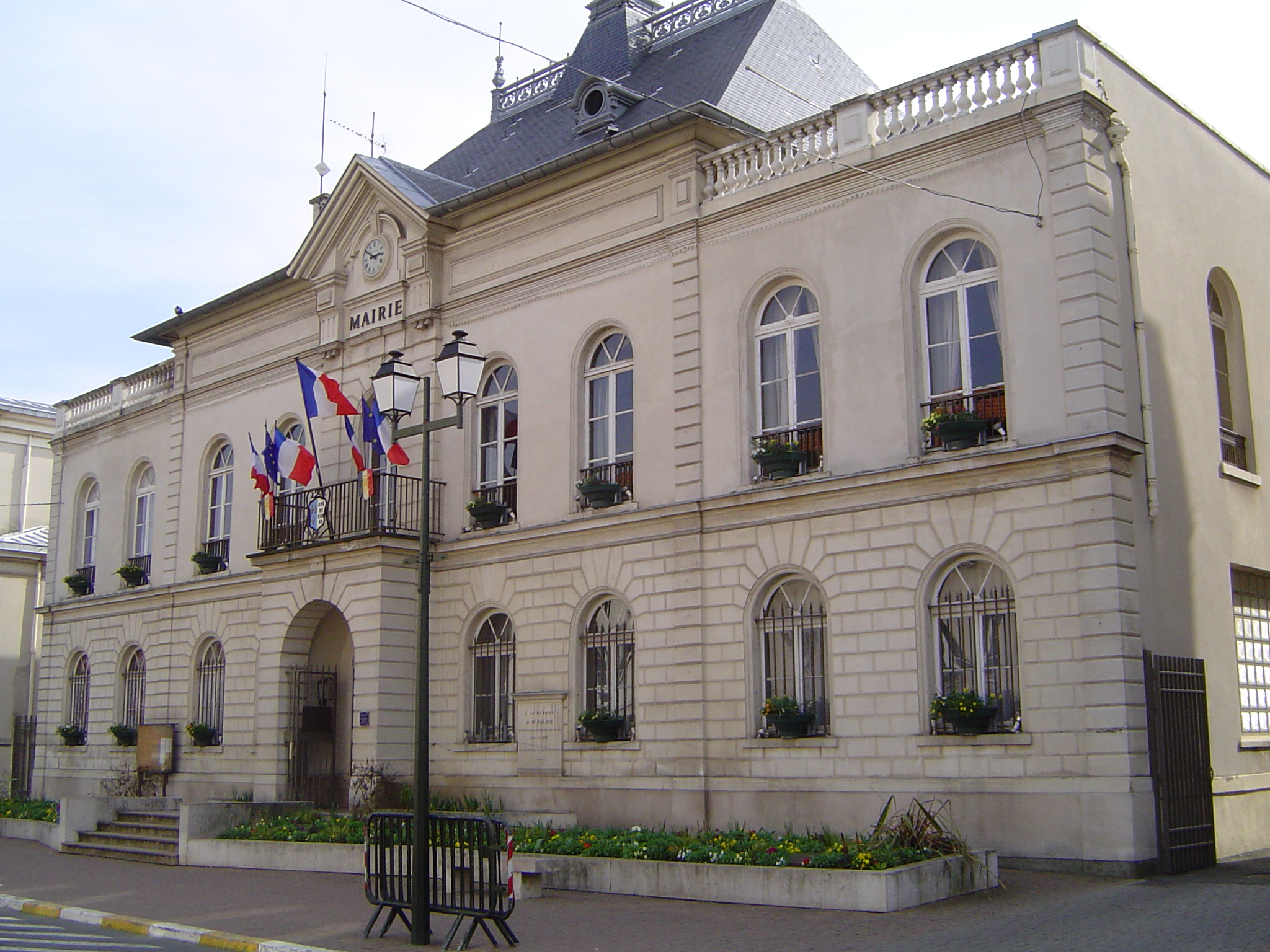
- The main frontage of the Hôtel de Ville in March 2009

General information
- Type: City hall
- Architectural style: Italianate style
- Location: Bourg-la-Reine, France
- Coordinates: 48.7790°N 2.3159°E
- Completed: 1845

Design and construction
- Architect: Claude Naissant

The Hôtel de Ville (French pronunciation: [otɛl də vil], City Hall) is a municipal building in Bourg-la-Reine, Hauts-de-Seine, in the southwestern suburbs of Paris, standing on Boulevard Carnot. It has been included on the Inventaire général des monuments by the French Ministry of Culture since 1992.

== History ==
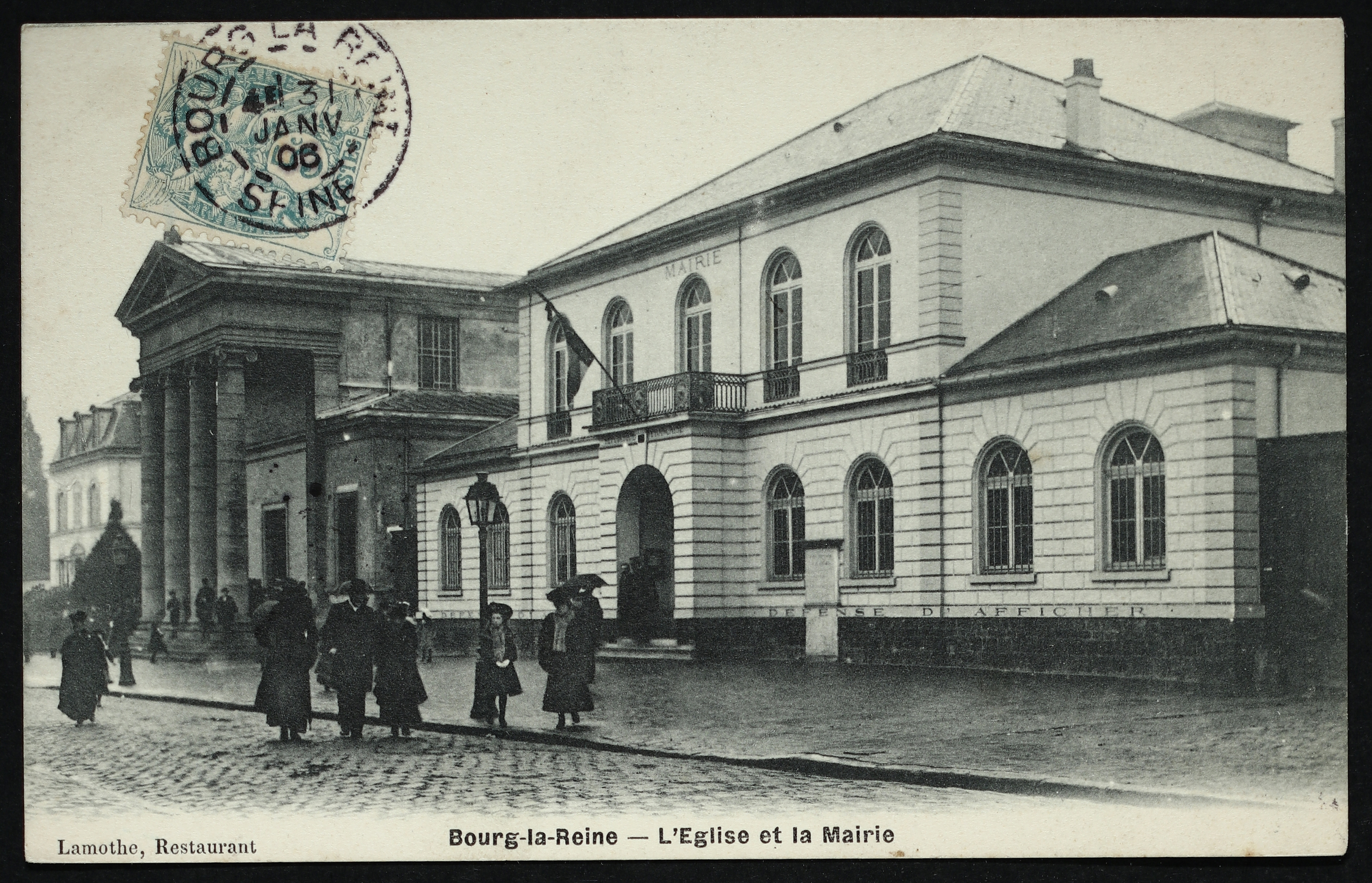
The building (on the right) before the modifications of 1911

Following the French Revolution, the new town council initially met in the home of the mayor at the time. This arrangement continued until the early 1840s when the council led by the mayor, Edme Marie Jean Baptiste Farcy, decided to commission a combined town hall and school. The site they selected was to the immediate west of the Church of Saint-Gilles on the south side of what is now Boulevard Carnot. The new building was designed by Claude Naissant in the Italianate style, built in ashlar stone and was officially opened by the mayor on 1 July 1845.

The building was laid out in three parts, with the town hall in the central block, the girls' school in the left-hand wing and the boys' school in the right-hand wing. The design of the central block of five bays, which was rusticated on the ground floor, featured a round-headed porch with voussoirs and a keystone on the ground floor, and a round-headed French door with iron railings on the first floor. The outer bays of the central block were fenestrated by round-headed windows on both floors. The building was entirely devoted to municipal affairs after the pupils moved to the new École de la République on Avenue de la République in 1889.

In the early 20th century, the council led by the mayor, Albert Candelot, decided to expand the building. The wings of two bays each, which were originally single-storey, were heightened by an extra floor to a design by Jules Frémeaux between 1910 and 1911. A pediment with a clock in the tympanum was added and a square lantern was installed behind it. After the work had been completed the building was officially reopened on 19 October 1911.

Internally, the principal rooms were the Salle des Mariages (wedding room) and the Salle du Conseil (council chamber). The wedding room was decorated by the symbolist painter, Alphonse Osbert between 1911 and 1913. The murals he created were entitled "Vers le passé" (Towards the past) and "Vers l'avenir" (Towards the future). Meanwhile the council chamber was decorated with works by the painter, Edmond Tapissier, which were installed in 1913. The paintings he created included a scene entitled "Cueillette des Roses" (cherry picking).

Following the death of the mayor, Gabriel Galois, in 1929, a plaque was placed on the front of the building, to commemorate his life, which included wartime service during the First World War.
