= Barbin (surname) =

Barbin is a surname. Notable people with the surname include:

- Bryan Barbin (born 1957), American politician
- Enrico Barbin (born 1990), Italian racing cyclist
- François Barbin (1691–1765), French porcelain maker
- Herculine Barbin (1838–1868), French intersex person who was known for her memoir
- Pedro Barbin (1895–1984), Filipino politician
