= Mennecy-Villeroy porcelain =

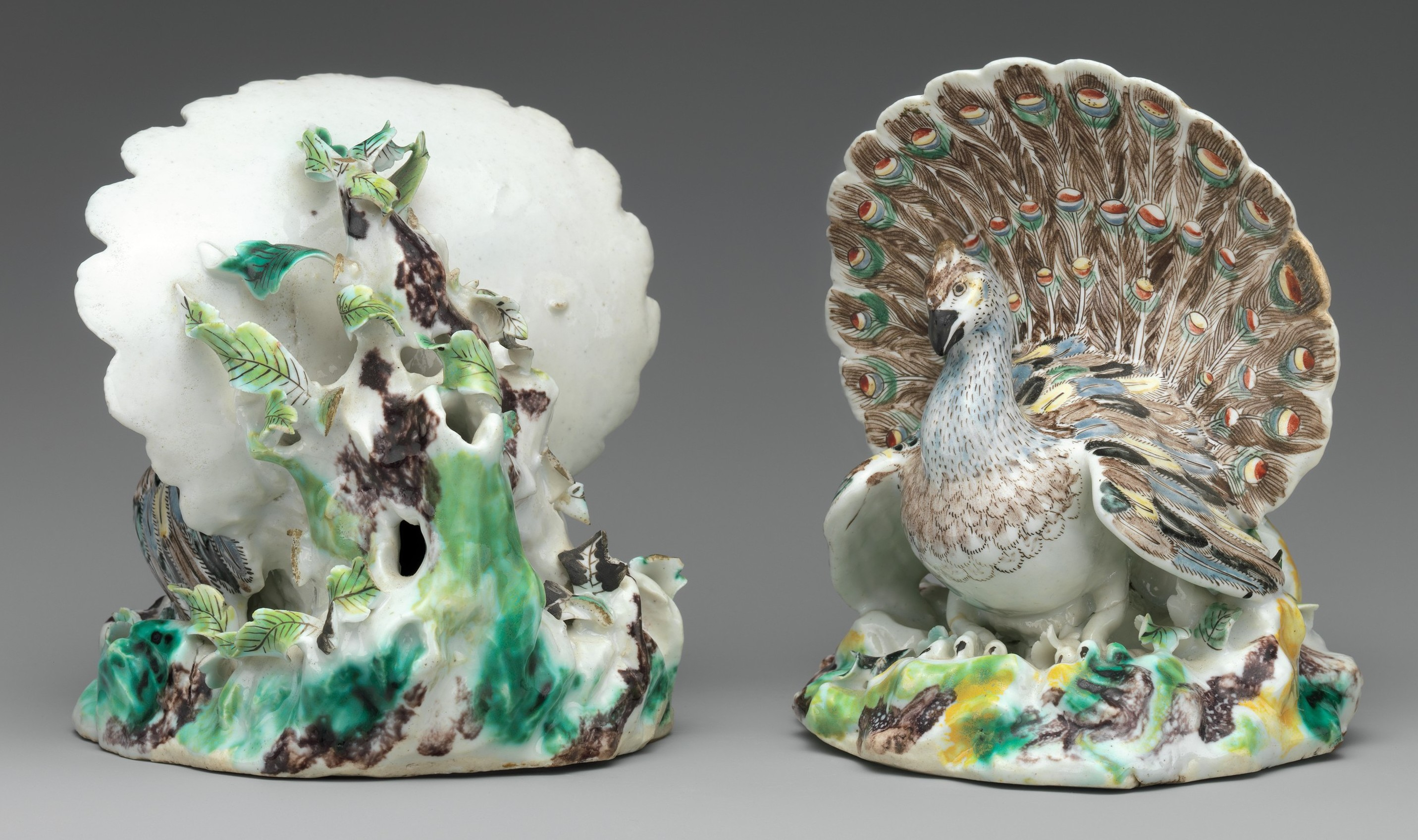
Pair of peacocks (back and front), c. 1745–1750

Mennecy-Villeroy porcelain (or Mennecy porcelain) is a French soft-paste porcelain from the manufactory established under the patronage of Louis-François-Anne de Neufville, duc de Villeroy (1695–1766) and—from 1748—housed in outbuildings ("les petites maisons") in the park of his château de Villeroy, and in the nearby village of Mennecy (Île-de-France). The history of the factory remains somewhat unclear, but it is typically regarded as producing between about 1738 and 1765.

== History ==
The arcanist in charge was François Barbin (1691–1765), who was already established as a maker of faience under Villeroy's protection when the parish registers commence in 1737. Barbin was identified in an action at law of August 1748 as having already spent fourteen years as a maker of porcelain in a house in the rue de Charonne, faubourg Saint-Antoine, Paris, where he and his wares had recently been seized and the porcelain sold, as impinging upon the prerogatives of the monopoly for exclusive manufacture of porcelains "in the manner of Saxony" (that is, Meissen porcelain) granted to the manufacture of porcelain at Vincennes in 1745; he sought protection away from Paris, with his protector the well-connected duc de Villeroy, combining his porcelain manufacture with the already established faience industry at the château de Villeroy and Mennecy. None of these early "rue de Charennes" porcelains made in 1734–1748 have been identified, but a piece of faience at the Musée de Sèvres bears the date 1748 and the mark D.V.. Alternatively, the rue de Charonne house had only ever housed the decorating section, using fired blanks brought up from Mennecy.

Management of the factory was assumed by Barbin's son, Jean-Baptiste, who bought out his father and his brother-in-law; after the younger Barbin's death shortly after his father, 14 September 1765, the lease was bought from his widow by partners of the porcelain manufactory at Sceaux, the sculptor Charles-Symphorien Jacques and the painter Joseph Jullien, who shifted the factory to Bourg-la-Reine, close to the main market, Paris—where Barbin had not received a permit to construct a kiln in 1748. There they had the protection of Louis-Charles de Bourbon, comte d'Eu.

== Products ==
The Duke's DV and D.V. incised or in underglaze blue were used as the factory mark. The elite wares of Mennecy were intended to compete with Chantilly porcelain and other small manufactures, which were joined in 1745 by Vincennes porcelain. Besides table wares, Mennecy-Villeroy specialized in small figures, representing the Seasons, commedia dell'arte characters, and other galanteries.

The early wares were similar to those of Saint-Cloud, with the body having a "creamy tone with a greenish surface". Pieces were mostly small, figures or various types of pots and jars rather than dinner services. As with other French factories, this may have been partly an inhibition created by the monopoly granted to Vincennes in 1745. There is no use of gilding, with rims painted in pink or blue. From 1753 the head modeller was Nicolas Gauron, who later worked at Tournai and Derby.

== Gallery ==
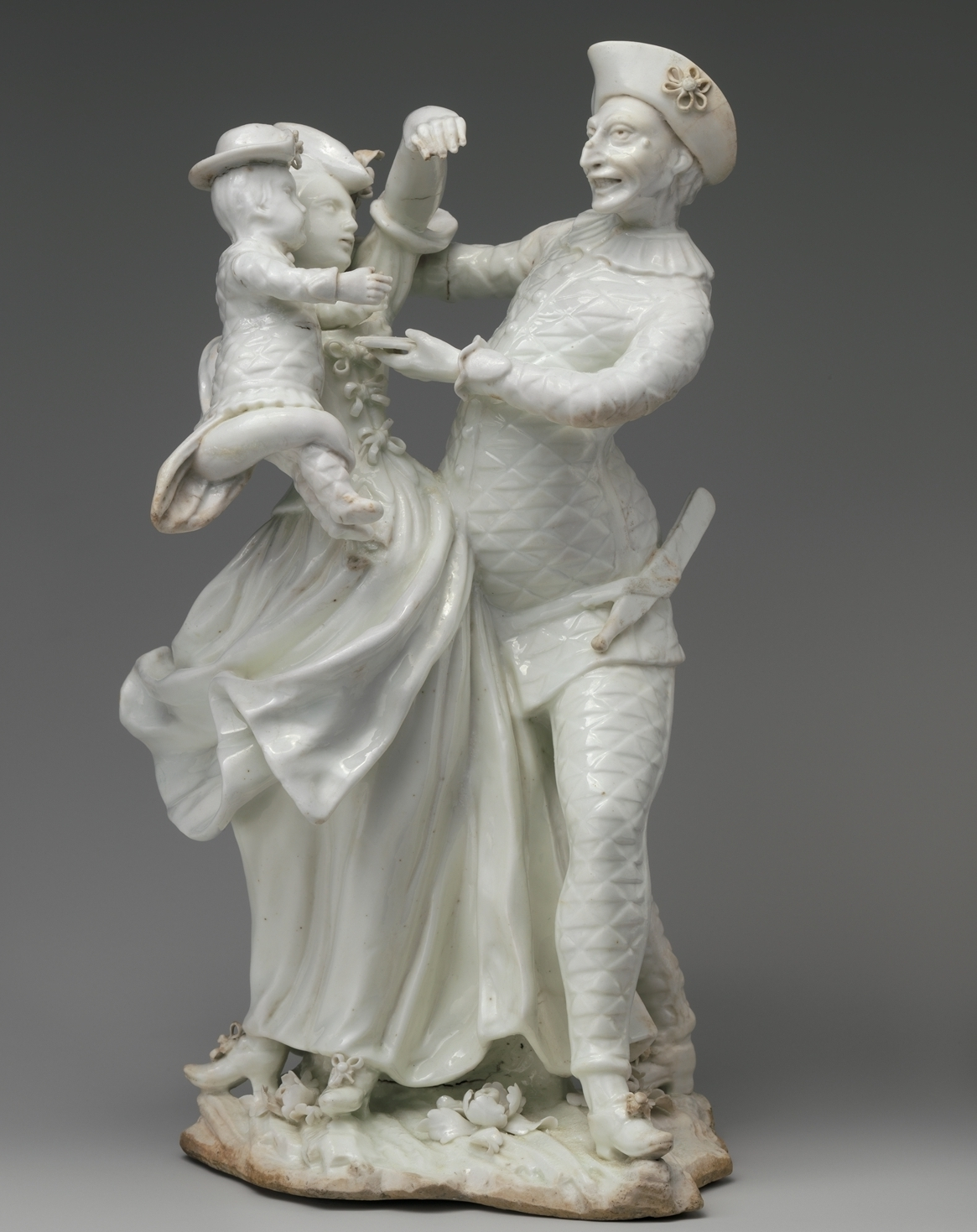
Harlequin Family, 1740–1745, based on a Meissen group, one of the "factory's finest achievements"

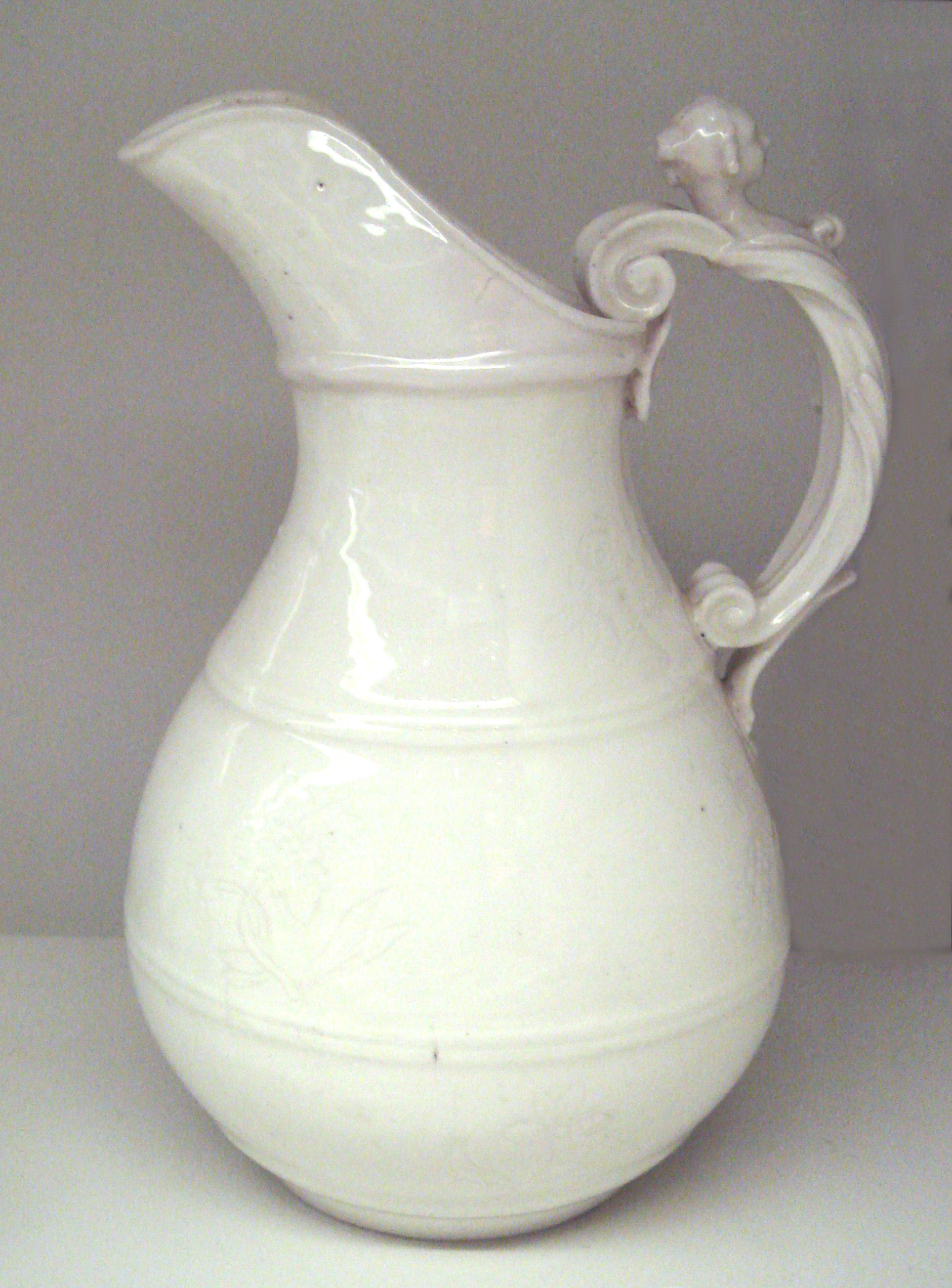
Villeroy-Mennecy soft-paste porcelain ewer, 1740–1750

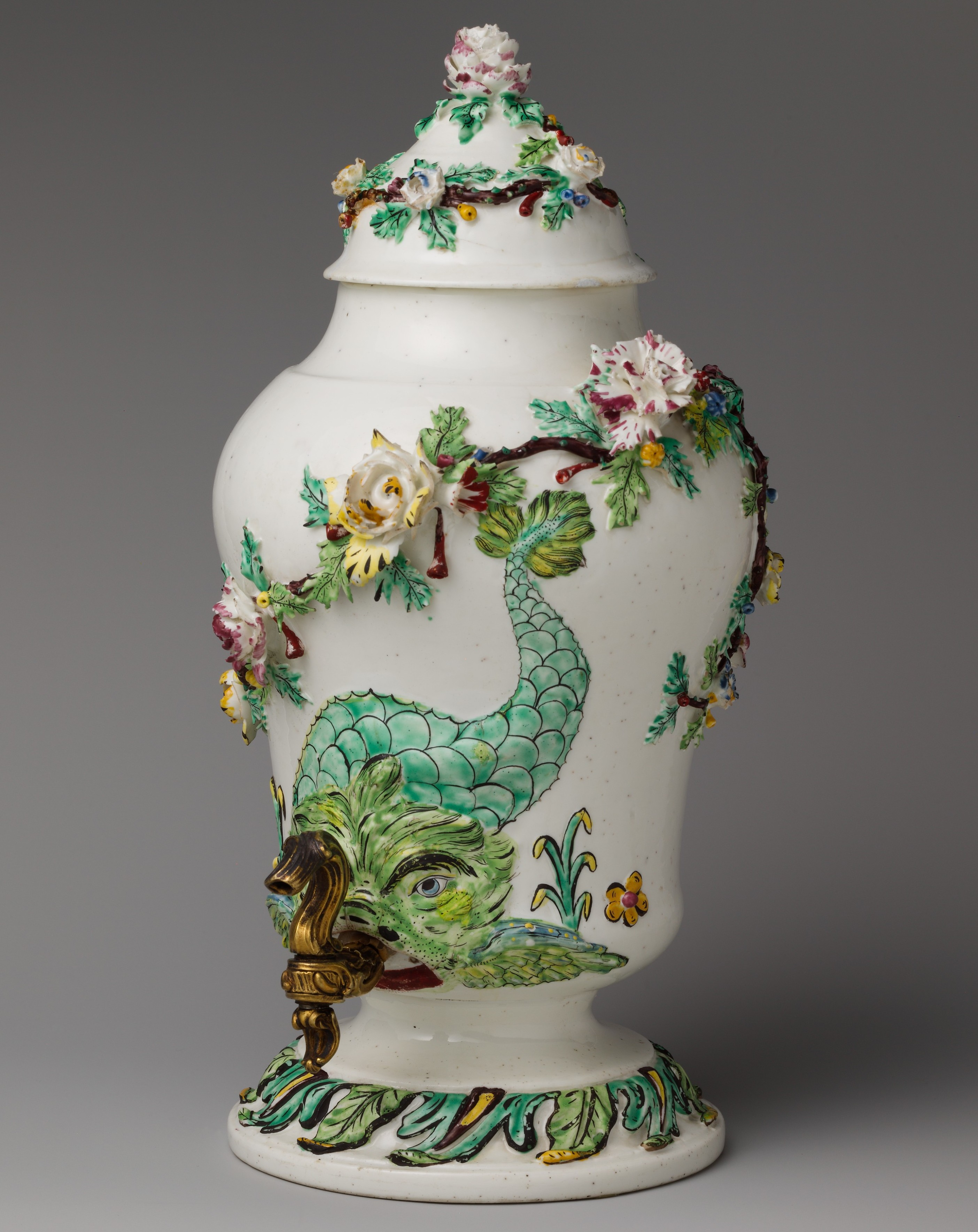
Fountain with cover and spigot, 1745–1750

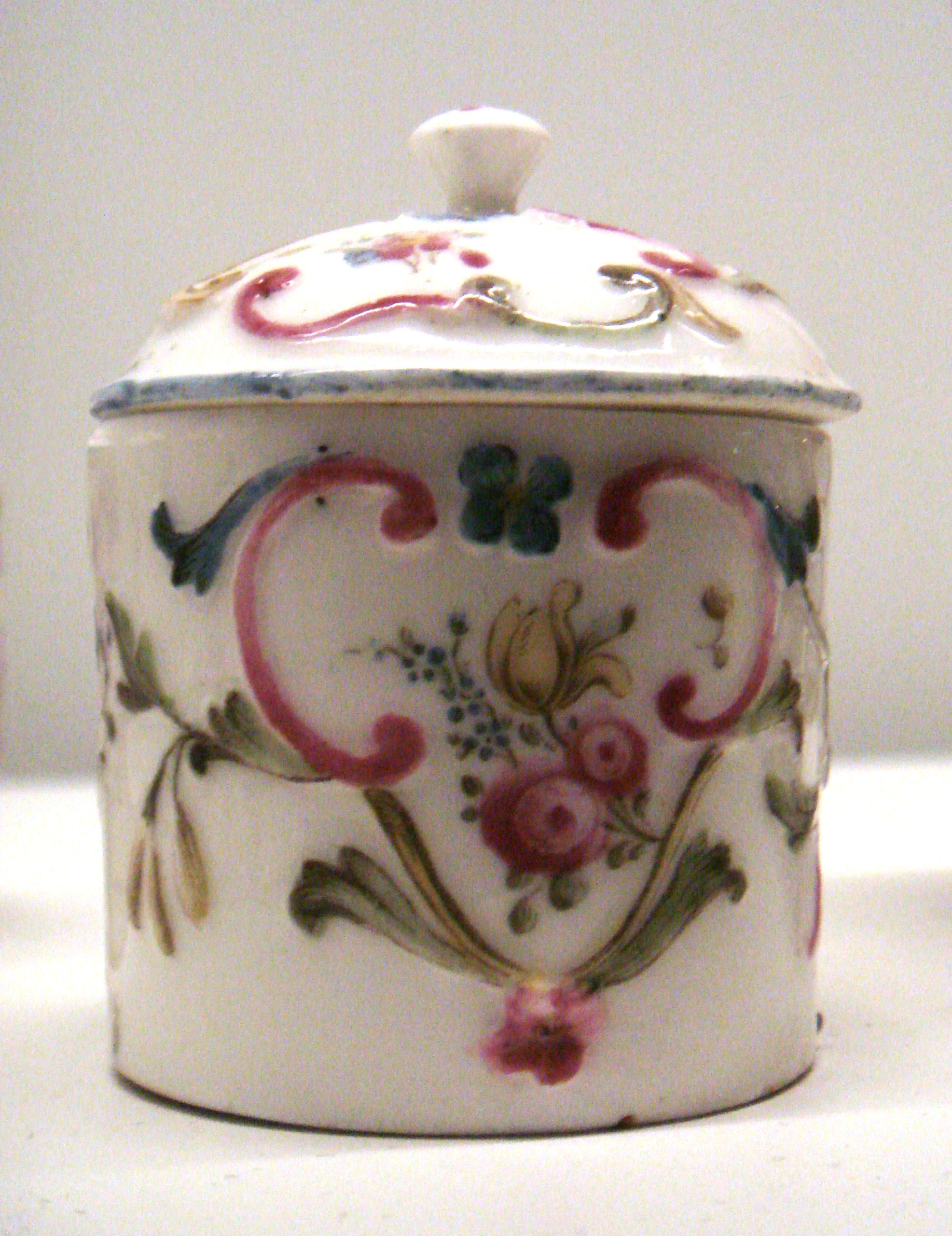
Mennecy soft-paste porcelain covered cup, c. 1750

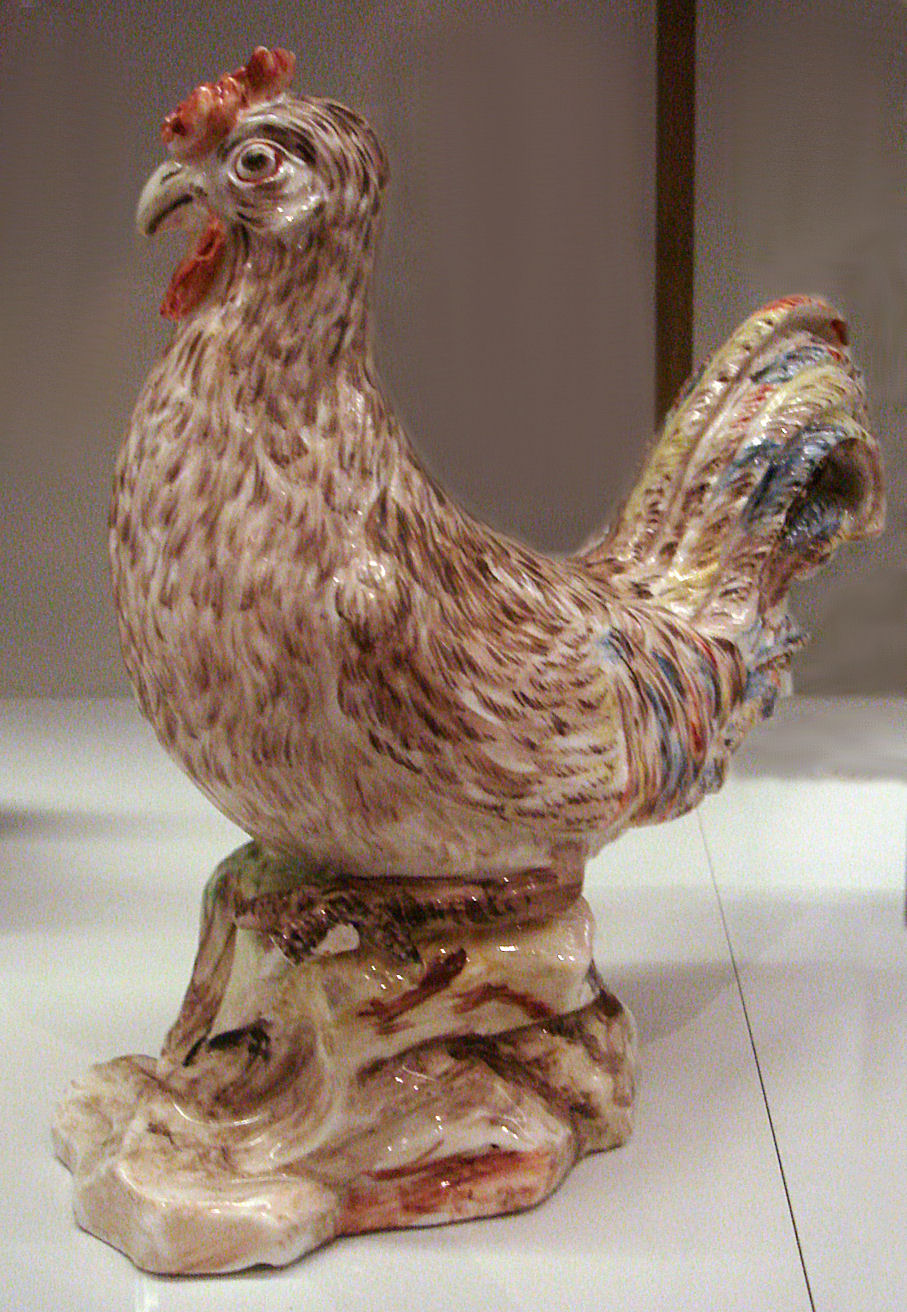
Cock, soft-paste porcelain, Villeroy-Mennecy, c. 1750

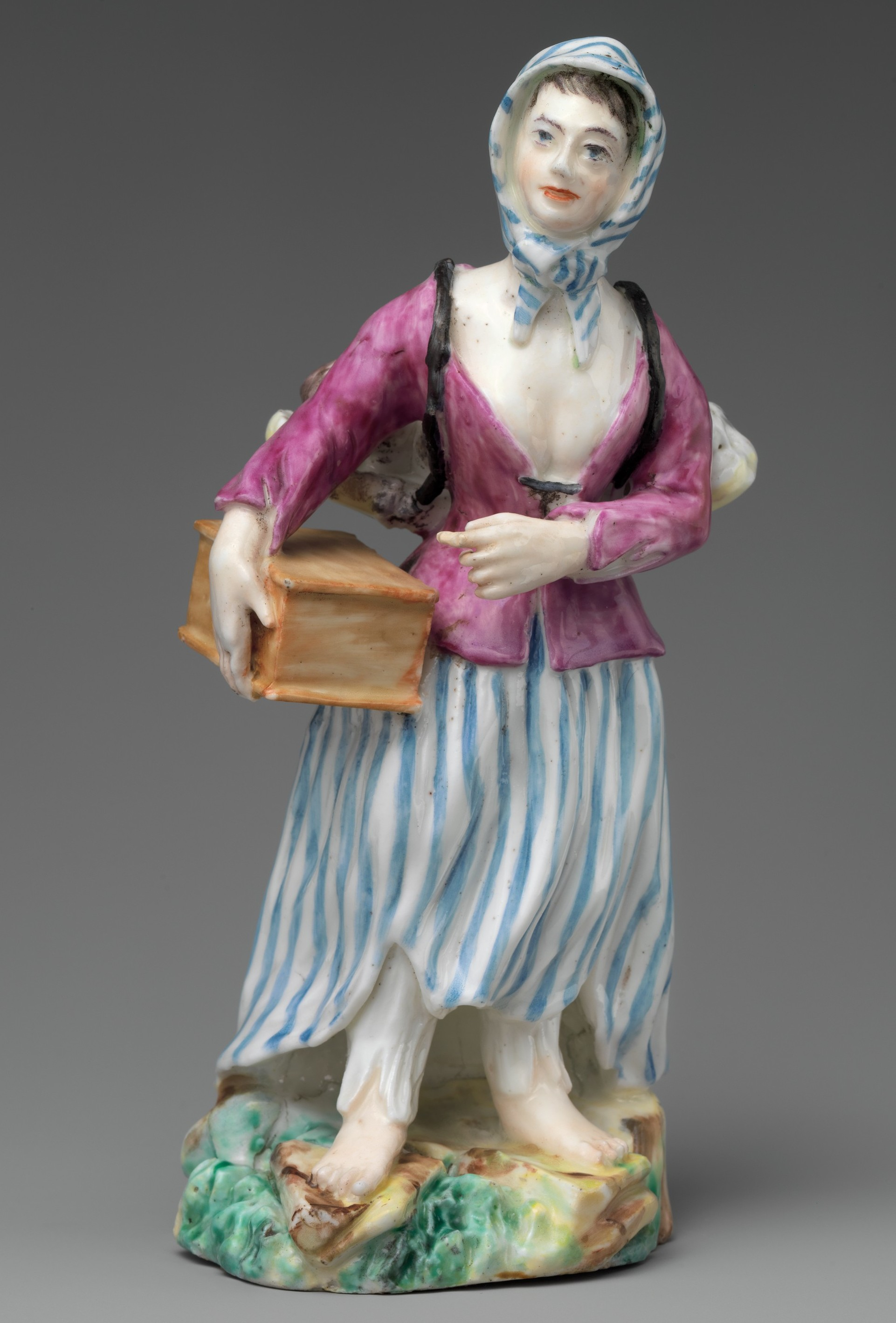
Peasant woman with child, 1750s

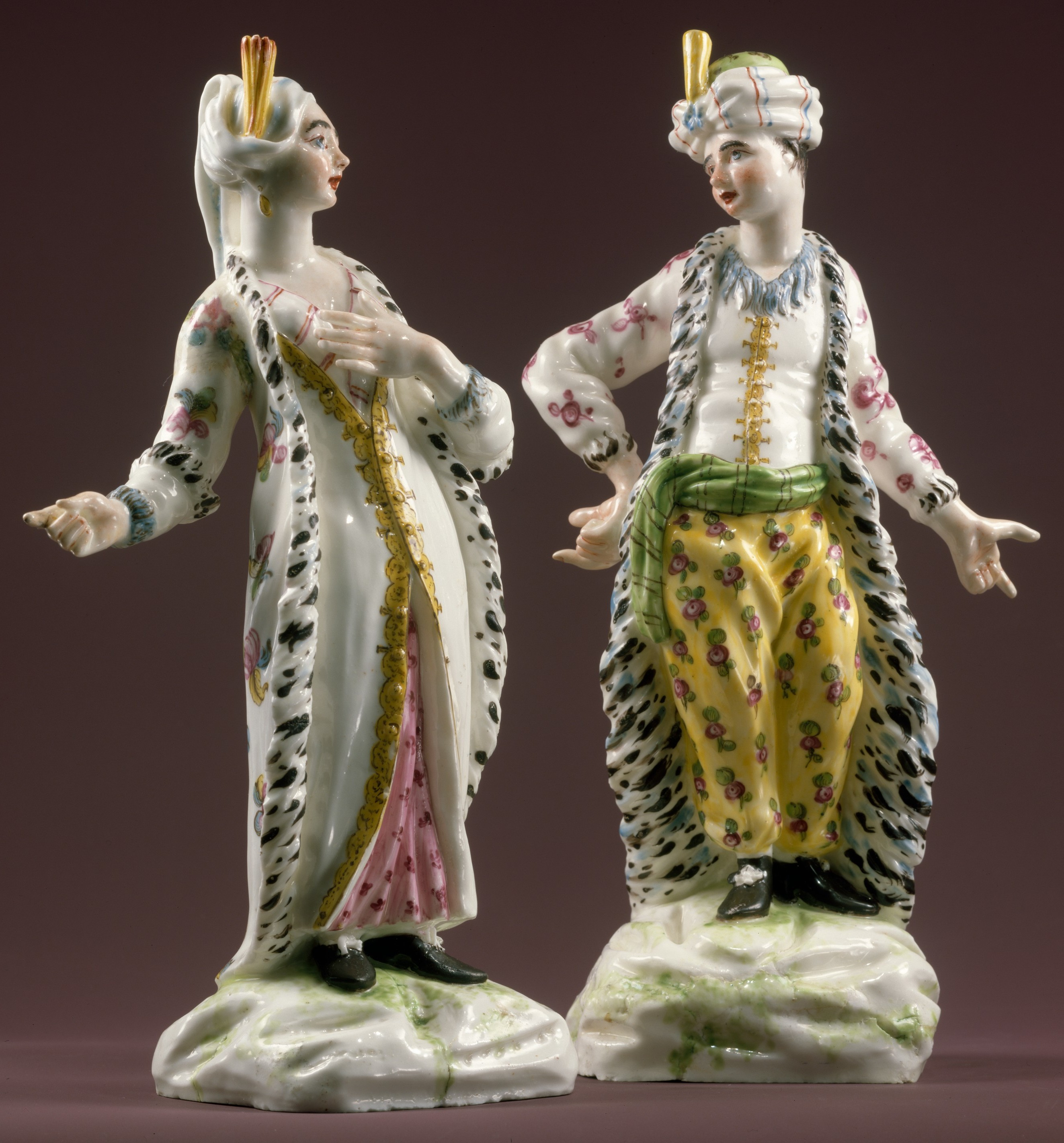
Couple dressed as Persians, c. 1760

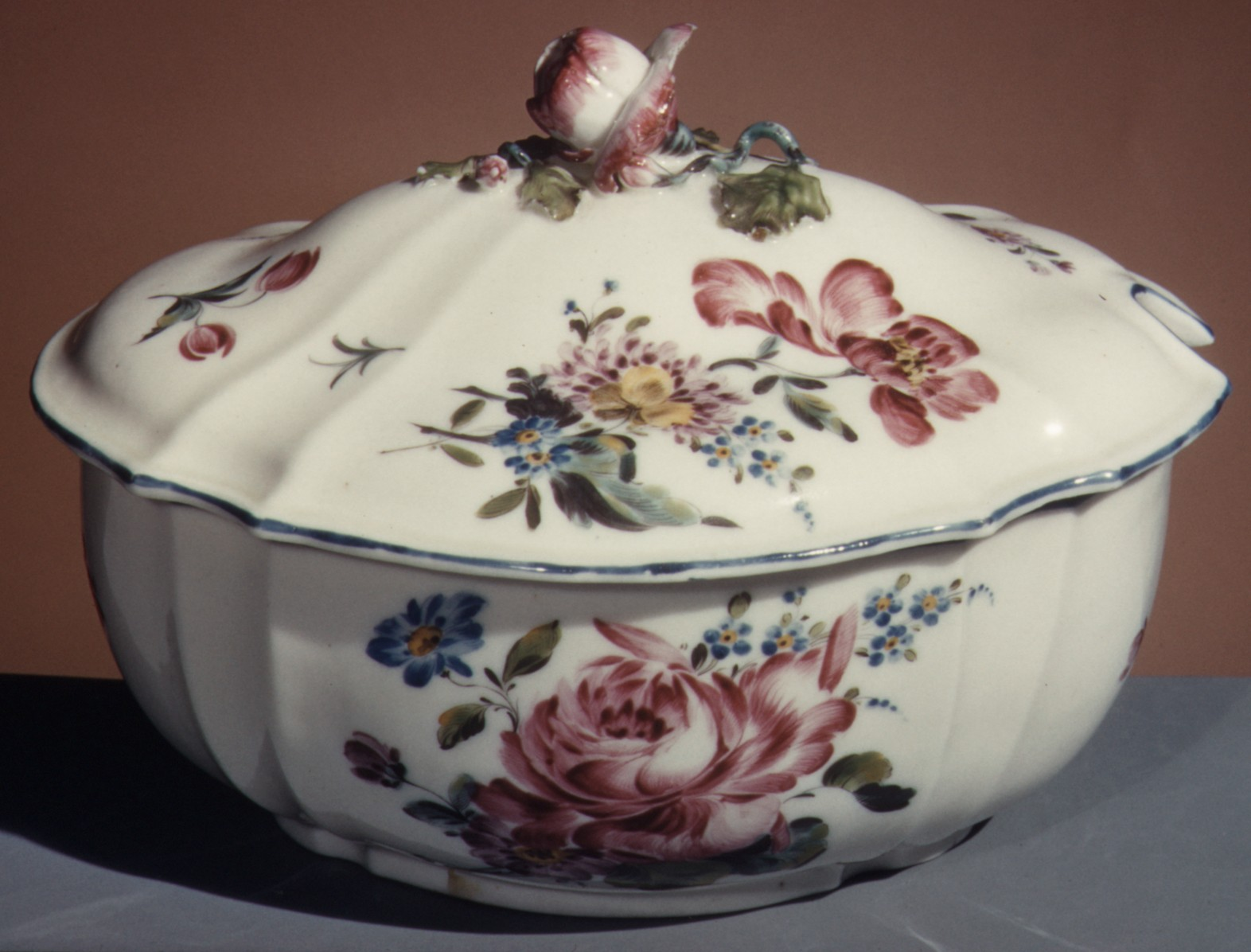
Sugar bowl, c. 1760

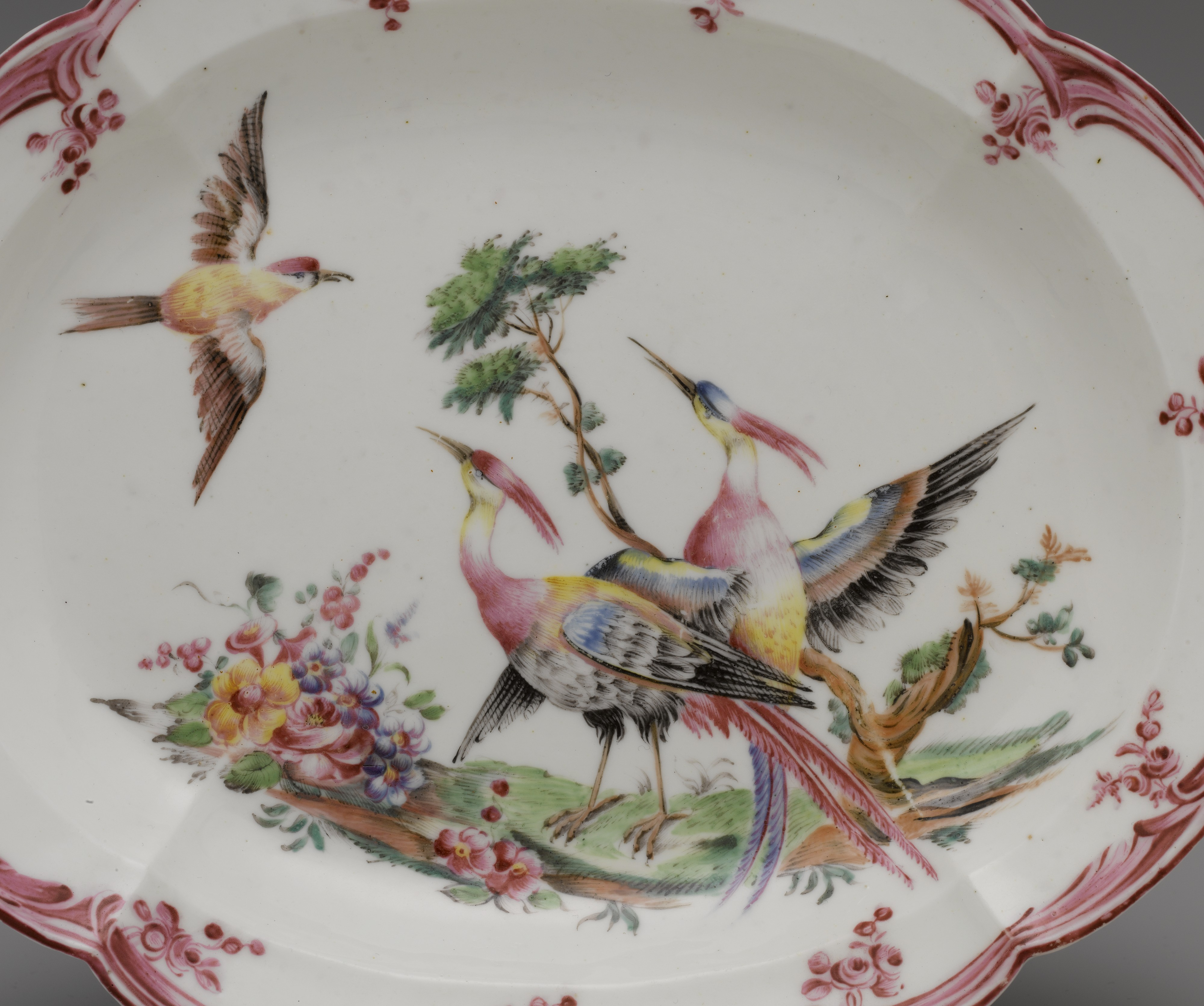
Detail of dish, 1760–1765

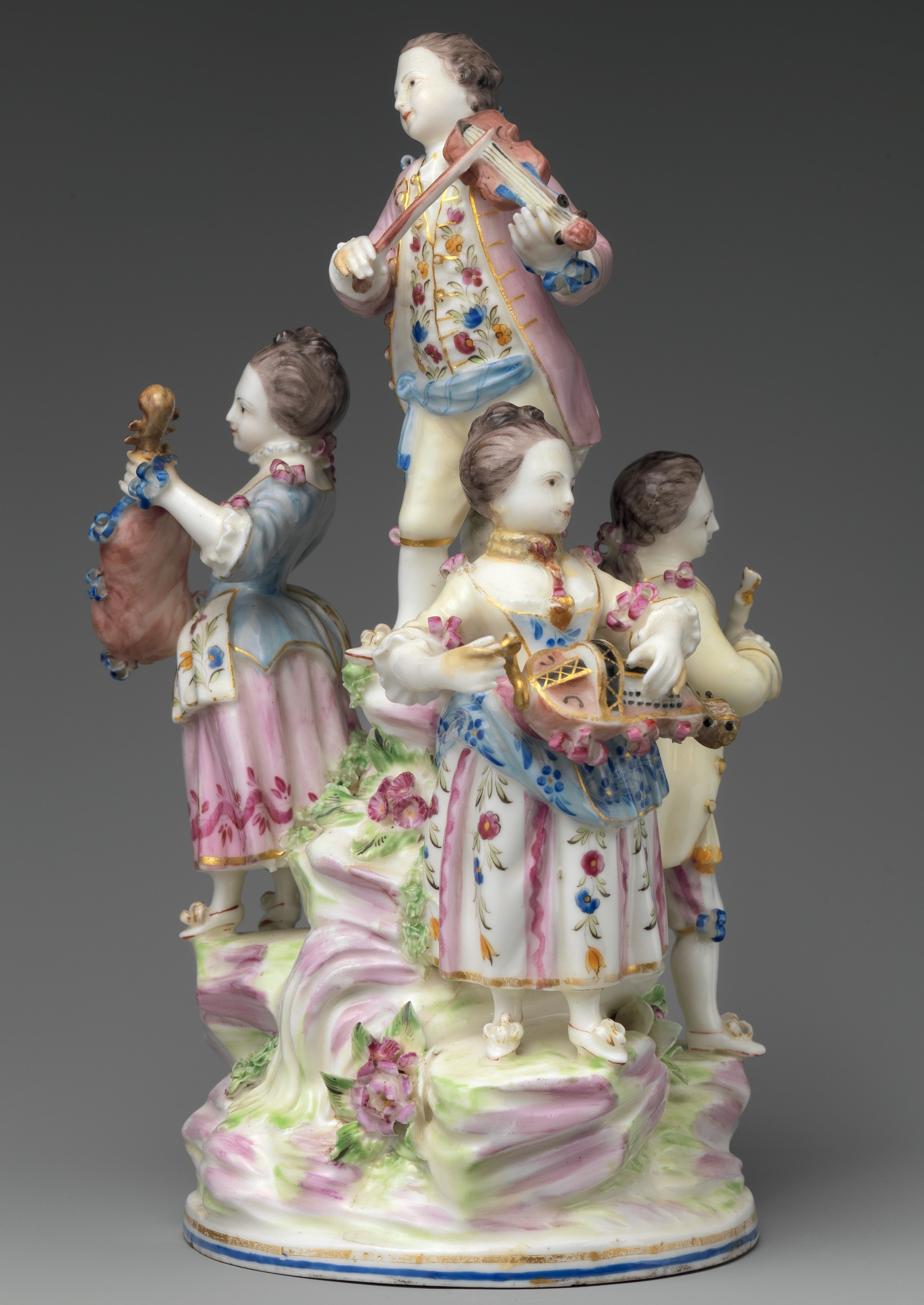
Group of four musicians, c. 1765–1770

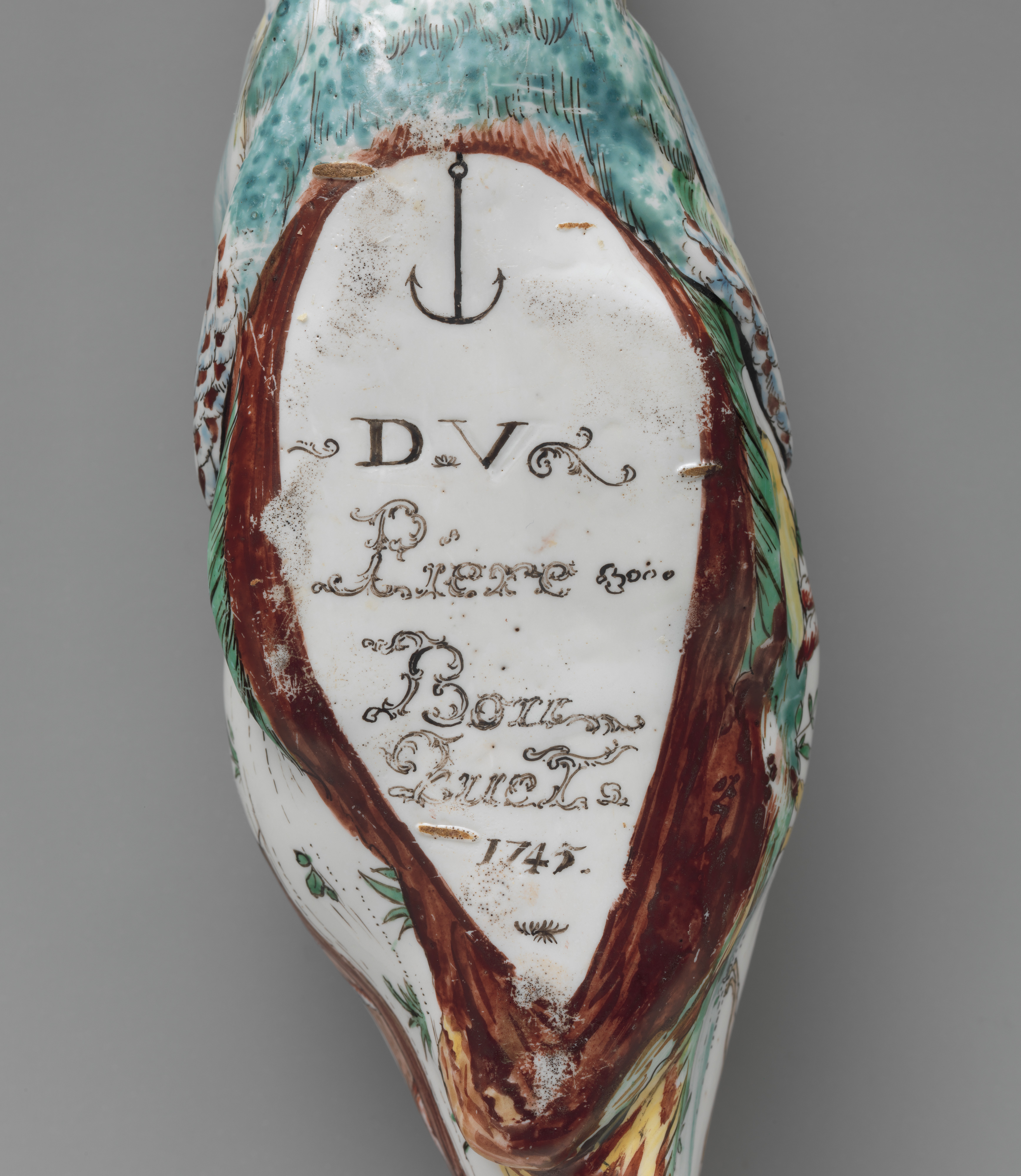
Factory mark from 1745
