= Institut Notre-Dame =

Institut Notre-Dame may refer to:

- Institut Notre-Dame in Bourg-la-Reine, Hauts-de-Seine, France (Paris area)
- Institut Notre-Dame in Meudon, Hauts-de-Seine, France (Paris area)
- Institut Notre-Dame with campuses in St.-Germain-en-Laye and Sartrouville in Yvelines, France (Paris area)
