= Yannick N'Gog =

French rugby player (born 1982)

- Born: Yannick N'Gog; 21 May 1982 (age 44) Bourg-la-Reine, Hauts-de-Seine, France
- Height: 1.80 m (5 ft 11 in)
- Weight: 85 kg (13 st 5 lb)

Rugby union career
- Position: Wing
Senior career
Years	Team	Apps	(Points)
- Bayonne
- SU Agen
2008	Scarlets	1	(0)
- Correct as of 12 January 2009
National sevens team
Years	Team		Comps
2004–	France		

Yannick N'Gog (born 21 May 1982 in Bourg-la-Reine, Hauts-de-Seine) is a French rugby union wing who went on a three-week trial with the Scarlets from SU Agen in 2008. He previously played for Bayonne and the French national Sevens team. He made his debut for the Scarlets on 9 January 2009, and became the first Frenchman ever to play for either Llanelli RFC or the Scarlets. N'Gog was born in France and is of Cameroonian descent.
