= Lycée des métiers Florian =

French vocational high school in Sceaux, Hauts-de-Seine

Lycée des métiers Florian is a vocational high school in Sceaux, Hauts-de-Seine, France, in the Paris metropolitan area.

As of 2016 it has 478 students. Around 2008 enrollment was between 440 and 660.

It was built in 1962. Around 2008 a renovation and construction project designed by Vaudou and Allegret Architects was planned.
