= Edmond Tapissier =

French painter

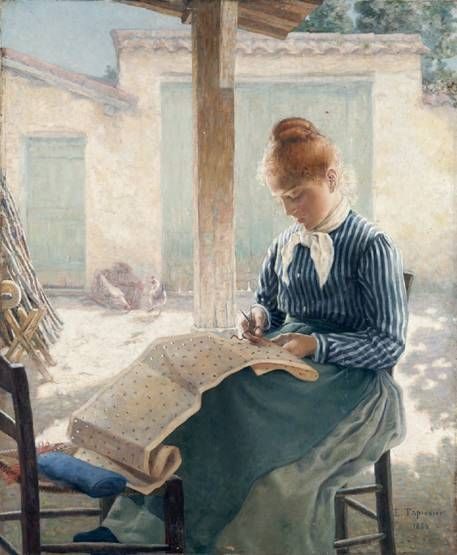
The Lacemaker

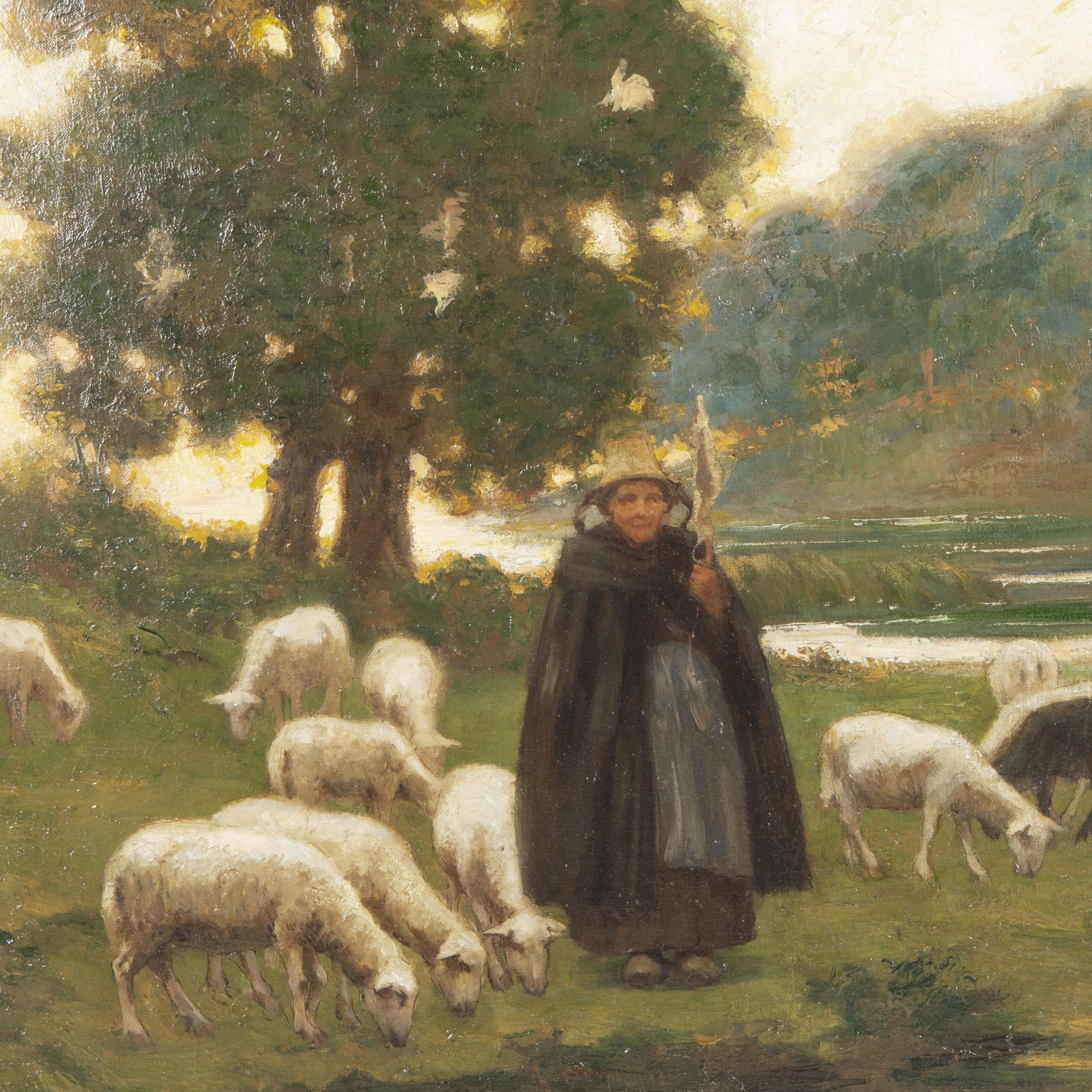
Shepherdess and Her Flock at Rest

Edmond Antoine Anne Tapissier (14 June 1861, Lyon – 27 April 1943, Treignac) was a French painter, illustrator, lithographer and tapestry designer.

== Biography ==
His father was a silk merchant. He first studied in Lyon under Jean-Baptiste Chatigny. He then went to Paris and enrolled at the Académie Colarossi, followed by the École des beaux-arts de Paris, where he studied with Alexandre Cabanel and Fernand Cormon. While there, in 1902, he married Jeanne Bonin (1880-1952), from Treignac.

In 1908, he exhibited at the Salon des artistes français and was awarded a bronze medal. He held a major exhibition at the International Exhibition of Modern Decorative and Industrial Arts in 1925.

He created numerous illustrations for children's books; notably Sam et Sap, famous for its pioneering use of dialogue balloons, but now racially offensive. It was published in 1908 under the pseudonym "Rose Candide". He also illustrated fables by Charles Perrault and produced caricatures for Le Petit Journal during World War I.

An avid traveller, he visited Russia, Italy, Greece, the Middle East and Turkey. He became an official painter for the Navy in 1918, and was named a Knight in the Legion of Honor in 1927. In addition to his paintings and drawings, he created tapestry designs for The Beauvais Manufactory and the Manufacture des Gobelins, as well as decorating some churches and town halls.

A number of his works may be seen at the Château-Musée de Nemours.
