= Institut Notre-Dame (Bourg-la-Reine) =

Coordinates: 48.7815°N 2.3173°E

Institut Notre-Dame is a Catholic private school in Bourg-la-Reine, Hauts-de-Seine, France, in the Paris metropolitan area. It serves preschool (maternelle) through senior high school/sixth-form college (lycée). As of 2016 it has about 2,000 students.

== History ==
It originated in 1861 when an educational institution for the deaf was established. What is now the junior high school (collège) building opened in 1962. In 1970 the school became coeducational. The boarding house (internat) closed in 1973. The high school/sixth-form building opened in 1982.
