= Lycée Marie Curie (Sceaux) =

Senior high school in Sceaux, France

Coordinates: 48.7769°N 2.2878°E

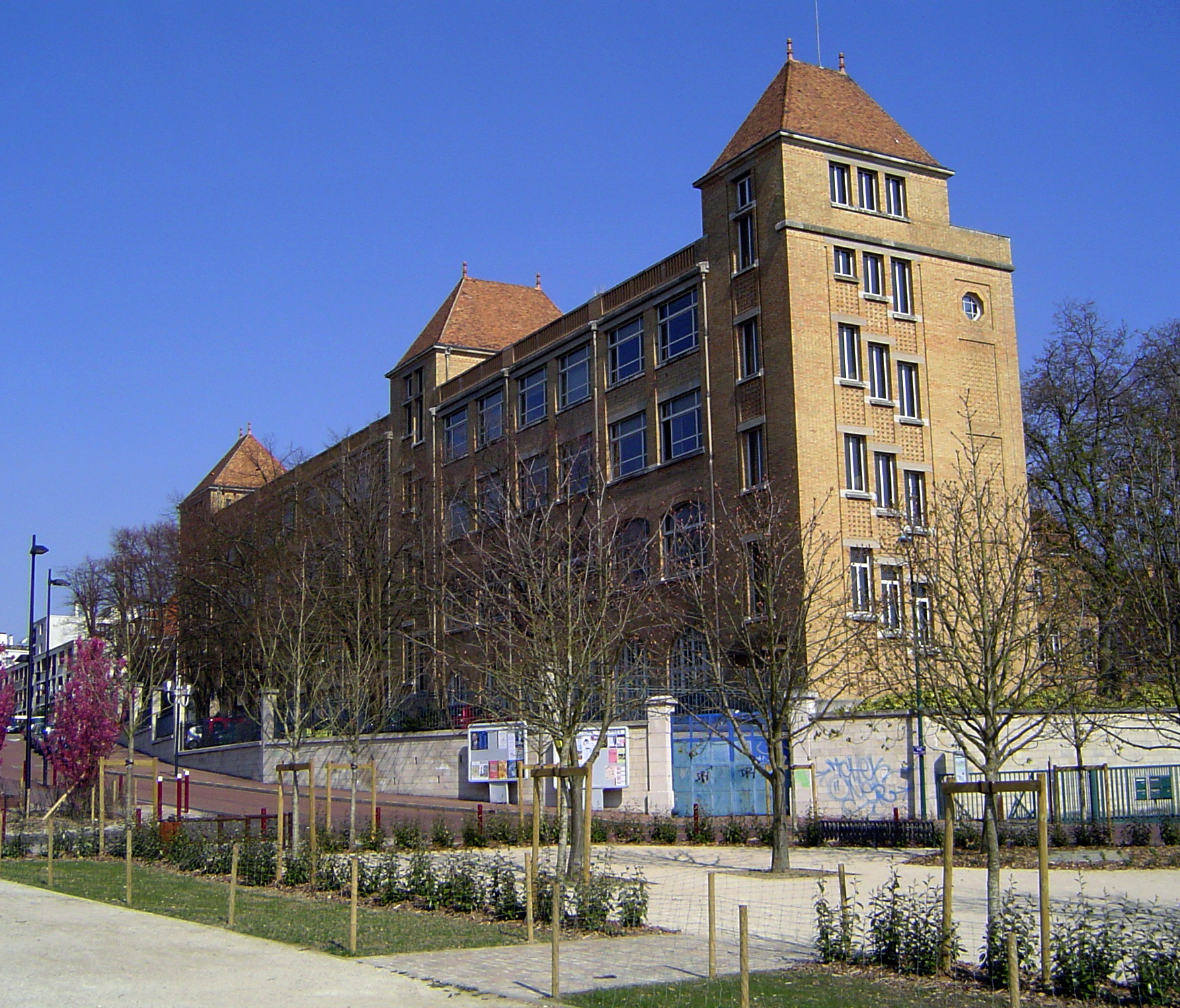
A photo of Lycée Marie Curie

Lycée Marie Curie is a senior high school/sixth-form college in Sceaux, Hauts-de-Seine, France, in the Paris metropolitan area. It is a part of the Cité Scolaire Marie Curie along with a junior high school (collège).

As of 2016 the lycée has about 1,200 students. Together with the junior high the entire cité scolaire has about 1,880 students.

== History ==
It opened in October 1936 as a school for girls. Suzanne Forfer was the school's first director. The Minister of Education, Jean Zay, officially inaugurated the school in 1937. Emile Brunet was the architect of the school building. The school had 500 students around its opening.
