= Sceaux, Hauts-de-Seine =

Sceaux
- Commune
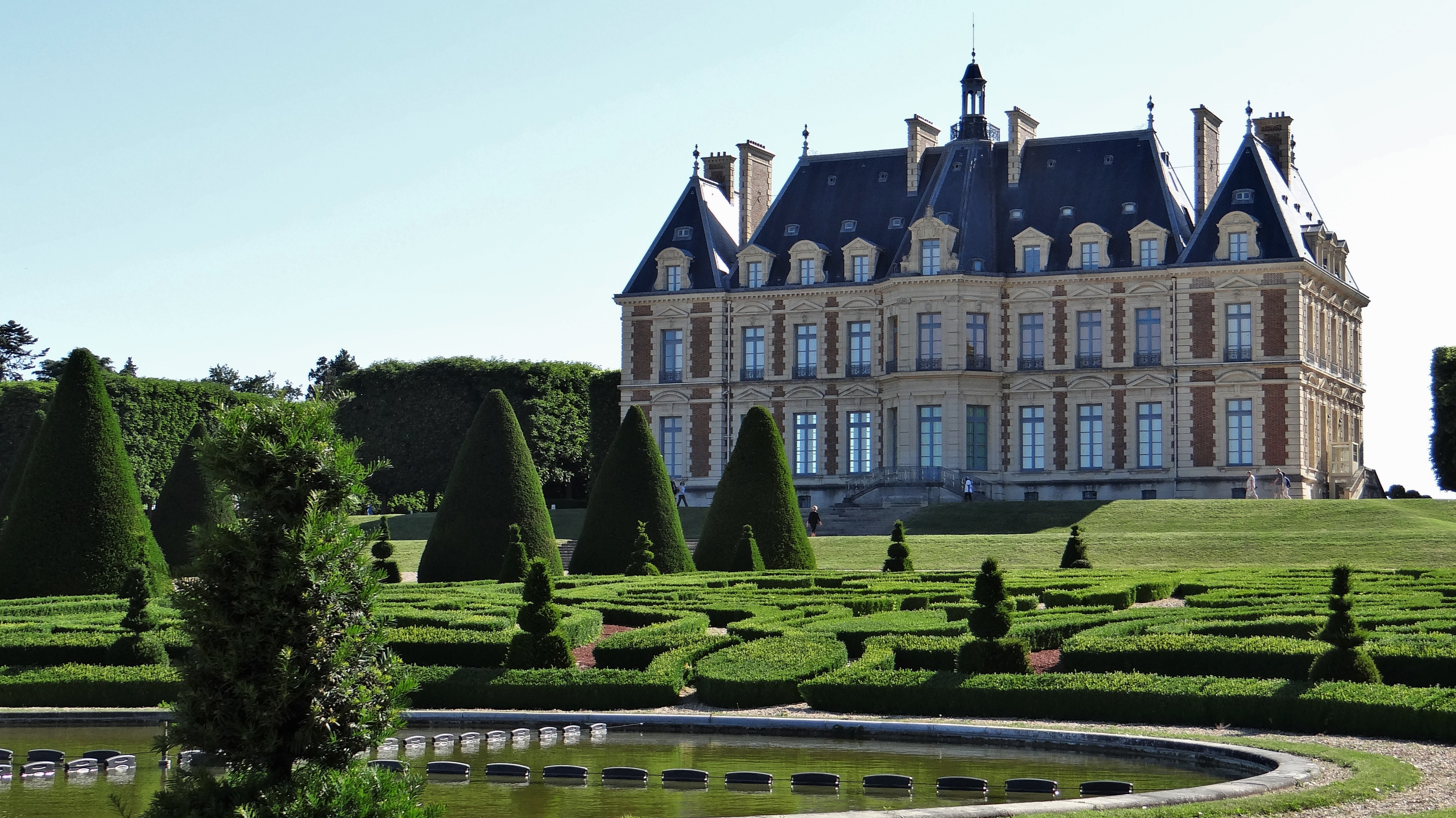
- The Château de Sceaux, in the historic domain of lord Jean-Baptiste Colbert (1619–1683), features gardens designed by André Le Nôtre.

- Coat of arms

- Location (in red) within Paris inner suburbs
- Location of Sceaux
- Location within France Location within Île-de-France (region)
- Coordinates: 48°46′43″N 2°17′26″E
- Country: France
- Region: Île-de-France
- Department: Hauts-de-Seine
- Arrondissement: Antony
- Canton: Châtenay-Malabry
- Intercommunality: Grand Paris

Government
  - Mayor (2026–32): Philippe Laurent (UDI)
- Area^{1}: 3.60 km^{2} (1.39 sq mi)
- Highest elevation: 103 m (338 ft)
- Lowest elevation: 53 m (174 ft)
- Population (2023): 20,884
  - Density: 5,800/km^{2} (15,000/sq mi)
- Demonym: Scéens
- Time zone: UTC+01:00 (CET)
  - Summer (DST): UTC+02:00 (CEST)
- INSEE/Postal code: 92071 /92330
- Website: www.sceaux.fr
- ^{1} French Land Register data, which excludes lakes, ponds, glaciers > 1 km^{2} (0.386 sq mi or 247 acres) and river estuaries.

Sceaux (French pronunciation: [so]) is a commune in the Hauts-de-Seine department in the southern suburbs of Paris, France. It is located 9.7 km (6.0 mi) from the centre of Paris. As of 2023, the population of the commune was 20,884. Sceaux is one of the most affluent areas of France and is known for its very high housing costs.

== Toponymy ==
The name Sceaux derives from the Latin cellae, meaning 'small huts'. This refers to the vignerons' huts that made up a lot of the medieval village.

== History ==
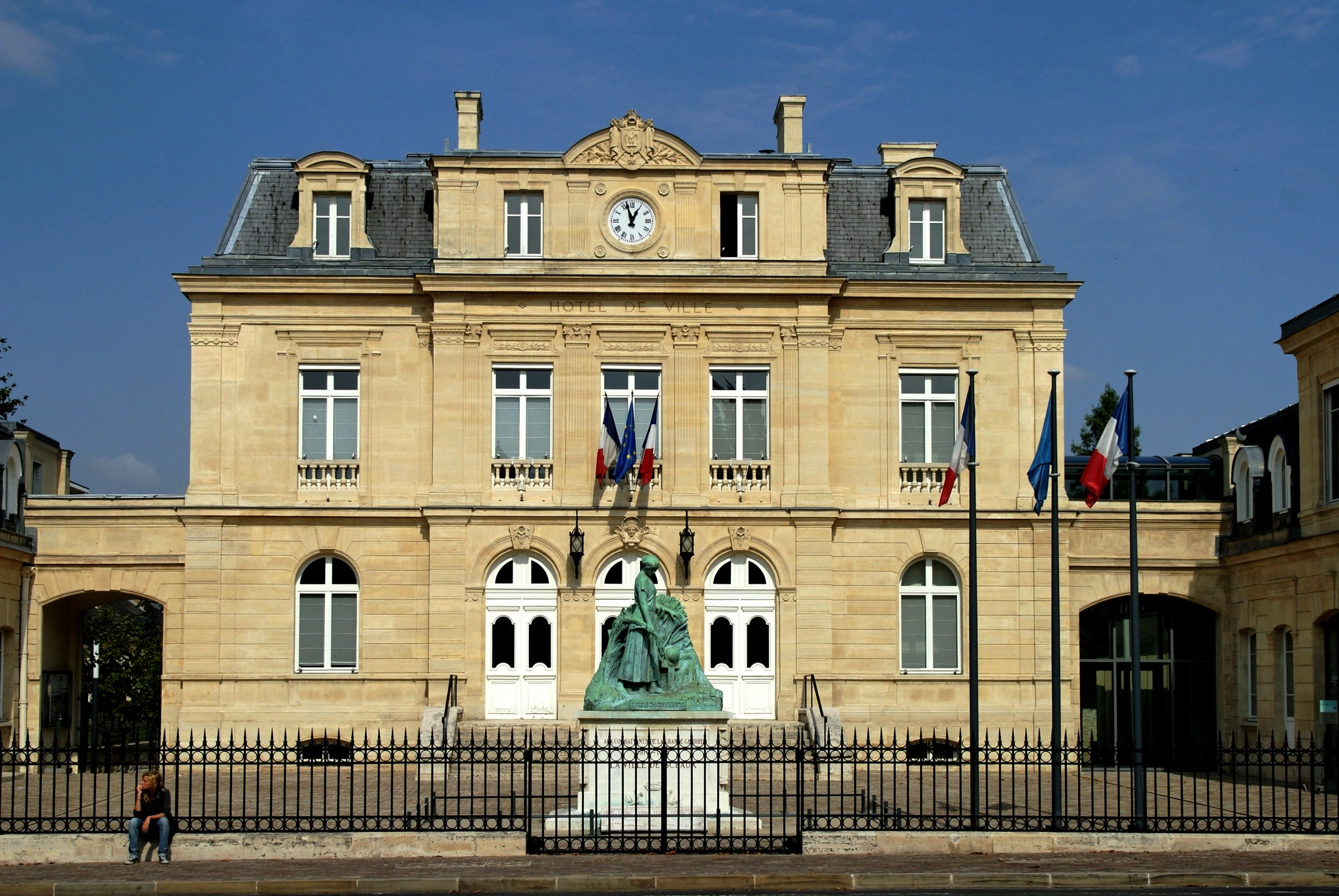
The Hôtel de Ville

Sceaux is famous for the Château de Sceaux, set in its large park (Parc départemental de Sceaux), designed by André Le Nôtre, measuring 2 km^{2} (0.77 sq mi). The original château was transformed into a School of Agriculture during the Revolution and lost much of its luster. It was demolished at the beginning of the 19th century following its sale by the then French government. The château was originally built by Jean-Baptiste Colbert, the minister of finance to Louis XIV and purchased by Louis' illegitimate son, the Duke of Maine in 1699. His duchesse held court in a glittering salon at Sceaux in the first decades of the eighteenth century. The present-day château, rebuilt between 1856 and 1858 in a Louis XIII style, is now the museum of Île-de-France open for visits.

The Hôtel de Ville was completed in 1865.

== Transport ==
Sceaux is served by three stations on Paris RER line B: Sceaux, Robinson, and Parc de Sceaux. The latter station is located at the border between the commune of Sceaux and the commune of Antony, on the Antony side of the border. It is also close to Paris-Orly Airport.

Sceaux is connected to the A86 motorway that circles around Paris. The commune also offers a developed network of buses which are often used by the Scéens (the name given to the residents of Sceaux) and the RATP bus network.

== Population ==
Historical population

Year	Pop.	±% p.a.
1793	1,865	—
1800	1,403	−3.98%
1806	1,569	+1.88%
1821	1,340	−1.05%
1831	1,433	+0.67%
1836	1,670	+3.11%
1841	1,844	+2.00%
1846	2,023	+1.87%
1851	2,035	+0.12%
1856	2,133	+0.95%
1861	2,267	+1.23%
1866	2,578	+2.60%
1872	2,287	−1.98%
1876	2,460	+1.84%
1881	2,783	+2.50%
1886	3,443	+4.35%
1891	3,567	+0.71%
1896	3,926	+1.94%
1901	4,541	+2.95%

Year	Pop.	±% p.a.
1906	4,857	+1.35%
1911	5,532	+2.64%
1921	6,207	+1.16%
1926	6,995	+2.42%
1931	7,840	+2.31%
1936	8,418	+1.43%
1946	8,448	+0.04%
1954	10,601	+2.88%
1962	19,024	+7.58%
1968	19,913	+0.76%
1975	19,709	−0.15%
1982	18,317	−1.04%
1990	18,052	−0.18%
1999	19,494	+0.86%
2007	19,679	+0.12%
2012	19,986	+0.31%
2017	19,344	−0.65%
2023	20,884	+1.28%

Source: EHESS and INSEE (1968–2023).

== Education ==
=== Primary and secondary schools ===
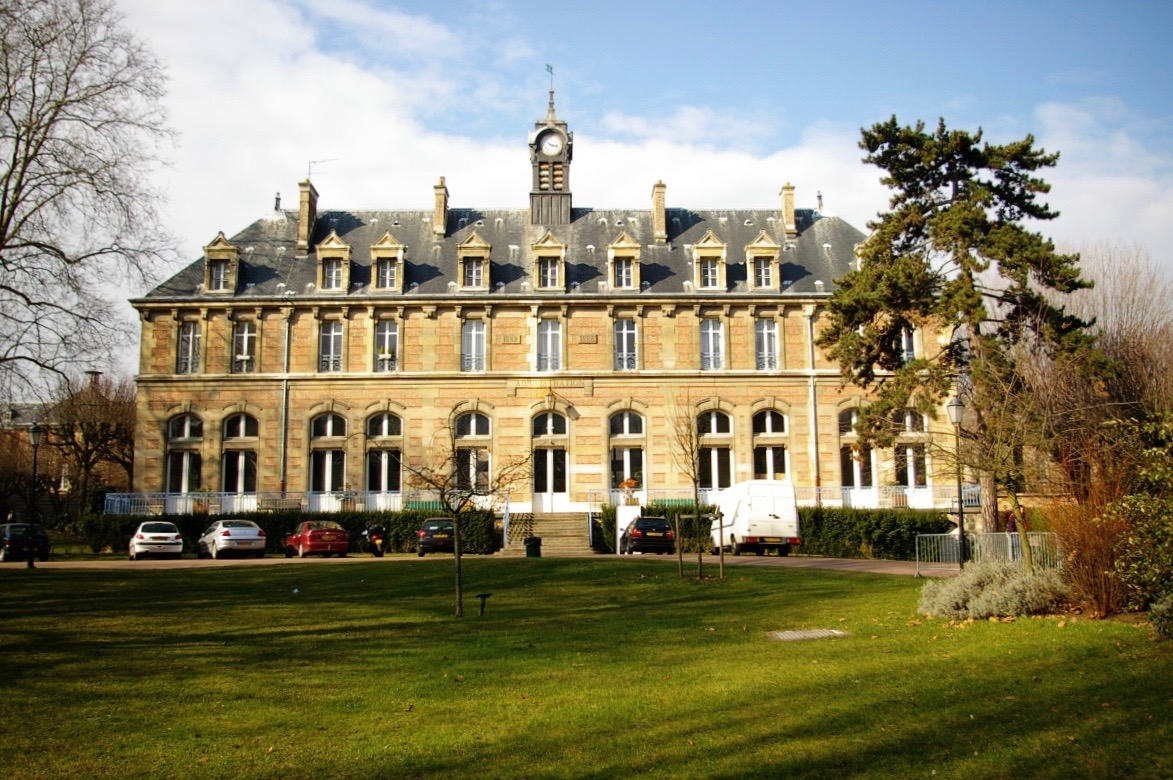
Lycée Lakanal

The commune has the following primary schools:

- Public preschools/nurseries (maternelles): des Blagis, du Centre, Clos-Saint-Marcel, du Petit-Chambord
- Public elementary schools: des Blagis, du Centre, Clos-Saint-Marcel
- One private preschool and elementary school: Écoles maternelle et élémentaire Sainte-Jeanne-d'Arc

Sceaux hosts two cités scolaires, combined junior high schools and public high schools/sixth-form colleges, the lycée Marie Curie and the lycée Lakanal. The lycée Marie Curie was named after the scientist who was married in, lived in, and was originally interred in Sceaux with her husband Pierre Curie. The lycée Lakanal was named after a French politician, and an original member of the Institut de France, Joseph Lakanal and has remained one of the most prestigious and hardest schools of Île-de-France. The school also offers a middle school and highly ranked "classes préparatoires" undergraduate training. French scientists and writers have graduated from lycée Lakanal, such as Nobel Prize winners Maurice Allais, Jean Giraudoux, Alain-Fournier and Frédéric Joliot-Curie.

There is also a public vocational senior high, Lycée des métiers Florian.

There is a private junior high school, Externat Sainte-Jeanne-d'Arc.

=== Colleges and universities ===
The Faculté Jean Monnet, the college of Law and Management of University of Paris-XI (Orsay), the Institut Universitaire de Technologie of this university and L'Ecole Polytechnique Féminine (EPF) are also located in Sceaux.

=== Public libraries ===
The Bibliothèque municipale de Sceaux is the communal library.

== Cultural life ==
Sceaux is home to one highly active national theatre, the Théâtre des Gémeaux, located in the Blagis quarter, which is part of the "Scène Nationale" network of the major theatres in France. The Théâtre des Gémeaux attracts audiences from all over Île-de-France and Paris. Its main event is the Spring dance festival with an international program of the highest quality.

The commune also has a small movie theatre, the Trianon, where international movies are released in their respective language and subtitled in French. The theater is also known for showing independent films and hosting special events.

Various music events take place at Sceaux. The classical music festival established by Alfred Loewenguth in 1969, the Festival de l'Orangerie, takes place in the Orangery built by Jules Hardouin-Mansart for the Marquis de Seignelay in 1686, in the Park at Sceaux. The Park also houses an open air opera every summer at the end of June.

The Parc de Sceaux was the location of Madonna's Parisian first visit with her Who's That Girl World Tour 29 August 1987, front 131,000 people, the largest crowd of any concert in French history.

In the classic French O-Level textbook series for English-speaking pupils, Le Francais d'Aujourd-hui, the Bertillon family move out to Sceaux from inner-city Paris during the course of the book's main narrative.

=== Notable persons ===
Gravestone of Irène Joliot-Curie, Frédéric Joliot-Curie and Michael Langevin

The mathematician Augustin-Louis Cauchy died in Sceaux in 1857.

Alain Delon (actor, singer, filmmaker, and businessman) was born in Sceaux in 1935.

Marie Curie and Pierre Curie were married in, and lived in Sceaux. The Curies' daughter, Irène Joliot-Curie, son in law Frédéric Joliot-Curie and their son in law Michael Langevin are buried in Sceaux's cemetery.

== Wildlife ==
The Parc de Sceaux is home to a population of red squirrels estimated to number between 100 and 120.

== Twin towns ==
- Royal Leamington Spa (United Kingdom)
- Brühl (Germany)

== See also ==
- Communes of the Hauts-de-Seine department
- Ligne de Sceaux
- The works of Maxime Real del Sarte
- List of tourist attractions in Paris
