= Alfred de Montesquiou =

French journalist (born 1978)

Alfred de Montesquiou (born 1978) is a French author and documentary film director. He is a laureate of France's highest journalism prize, the Prix Albert Londres, as well as a laureate of the Prix Renaudot.

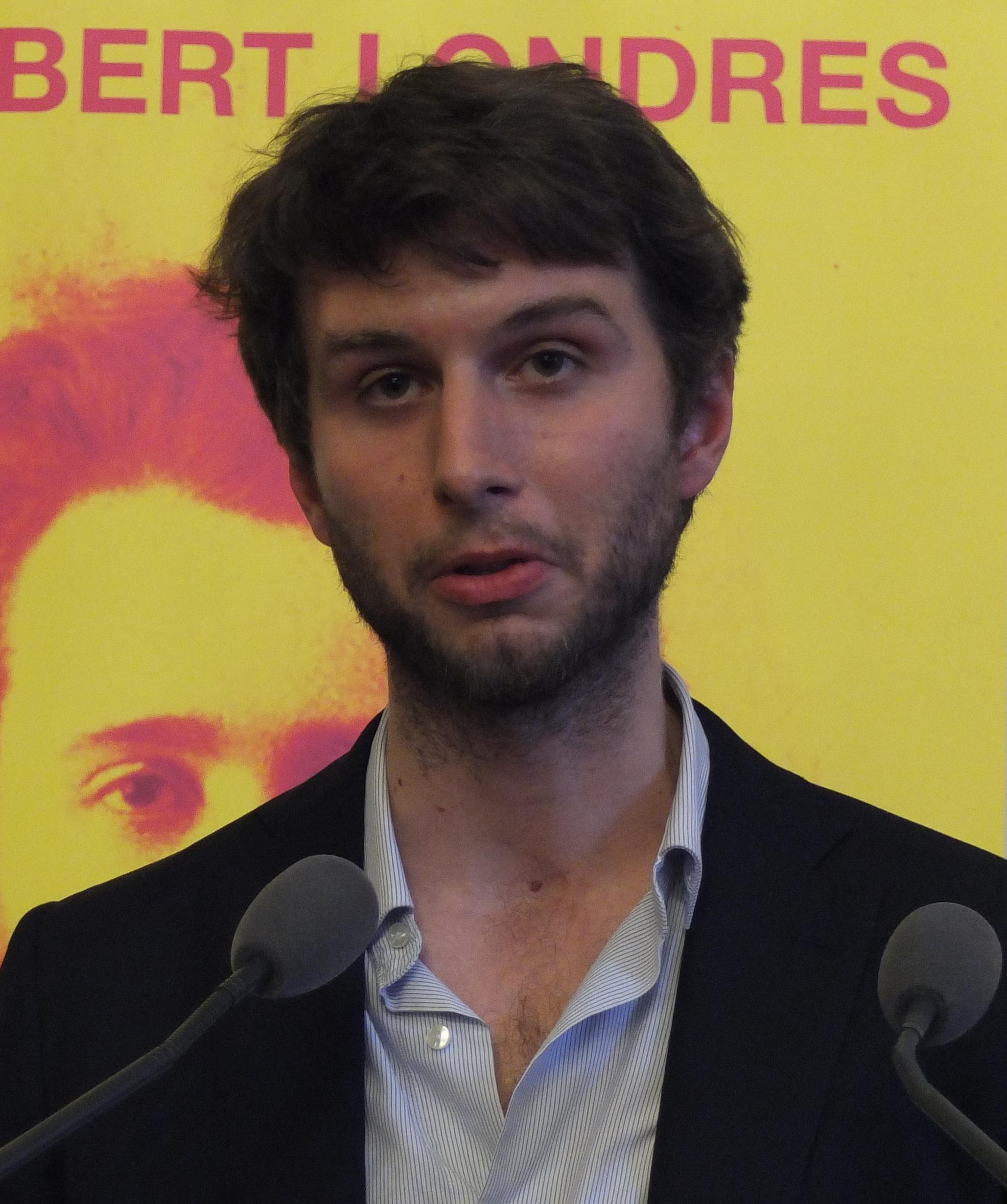
Alfred de Montesquiou, is an author and documentary film director.

== Biography ==
Born in 1978 in Paris, Alfred de Montesquiou is a graduate in international relations from Sciences Po, in philosophy from the Sorbonne and in journalism from the Columbia University Graduate School of Journalism in New York.

He is a member of the Montesquiou Family and the eldest son, and heir apparent to Jean-Louis de Montesquiou-Fezensac, count d’Artagnan. His maternal grand father, François Lefebvre de Laboulaye, was the amabasador to the United-States. Alfred de Montesquiou was a foreign correspondent and war correspondent for the Associated Press news agency from 2004 till 2010 first in Haiti then in the Sudan, where he was among the only permanently-based journalists to extensively cover the Darfur Genocide. He subsequently covered the wars in Lebanon, Iraq and Afghanistan and became an AP bureau chief in North Africa. In 2010, he transferred to the French news magazine Paris Match as a senior international correspondent. He covered the Arab Springs and the war Syria, and was awarded the 2012 Albert Londres prize for his coverage of the civil war in Libya. In 2013 he received the Interallie Nouveau Cercle literary prize for his essay on the Middle-East "Oumma". In 2015 he was the laureate of the French Press Editors' Association for his investigative work on the war in Donbas between Ukraine and Russia. His historical novel on the Nuremberg trials was awarded the Prix Renaudot in 2025.

As a documentary director and author, he has travelled across Asia along the Silk Road for a 15-episode series for Arte and Amazon Prime. He conducted a 5-part series across South America, also for Arte. He has directed several primetime documentaries for French public TV channels France 2 and France 5 on subjects ranging from terrorism investigations to ecology.

He runs a film production company, Dreamtime Films. His documentary "Lebanon, in the heart of chaos" won the Laurier d'Or 2022 TV award for best feature documentary.

== Films and books ==
Books:

- Le Crepuscule des Hommes Paris, Ed Robert LAffont, shortlisted for the Prix Goncourt, the Prix de l'Académie française and the Prix Interallié. Though a historical novel, it won the 2025 Prix Renaudot in the "essay" category (translated in English, Spanish, Italian, Chinese).
- La Route des Extrêmes, Paris 2019, Ed. Gallimard / Arte Editions
- Silk Road, Paris, 2017, Ed. Le Chêne/ Arte Editions
- OUMMA, Ed. Seuil, Paris, April 2013. Laureate of the Nouveau Cercle Interallie Literary Prize.
- In Amenas (with Marie-Pierre Gröndhal) e-book, Lagardère, Jan 2013
- He is a co-author of the texts for the photography book on the work of Remi Ochlik, killed in Syria in February 2012

Films:

- "Nuremberg", ARTE, 2025, 2 part 45 minutes documentary.
- "Julius Caesar", Canal +, 2024, 5 part, 5 hour documentary series.
- "Qatar" 2023, France TV, 80 minutes.
- "Lebanon, the heart of chaos", 2022, France TV (Laureate of the "Etoile d'or" 2022 TV prize)
- "South America: on the road of extremes," 2019, ARTE, 5 hour documentary series (author)
- "Animals against terrorism", France TV, 2018, 1 hour documentary (director)
- "Pere Hamel", France TV, 2018, 1 hour investigative documentary (director)
- "On The Silk Road" from Venice to Xi'an in the steps of Marco Polo, 2017, ARTE, 8 hour documentary series (author).
- "Gorilla War", Congo, France TV, 2015, 1 hour documentary (co-director)

== See also ==
- Montesquiou family
