= Renault Classic =

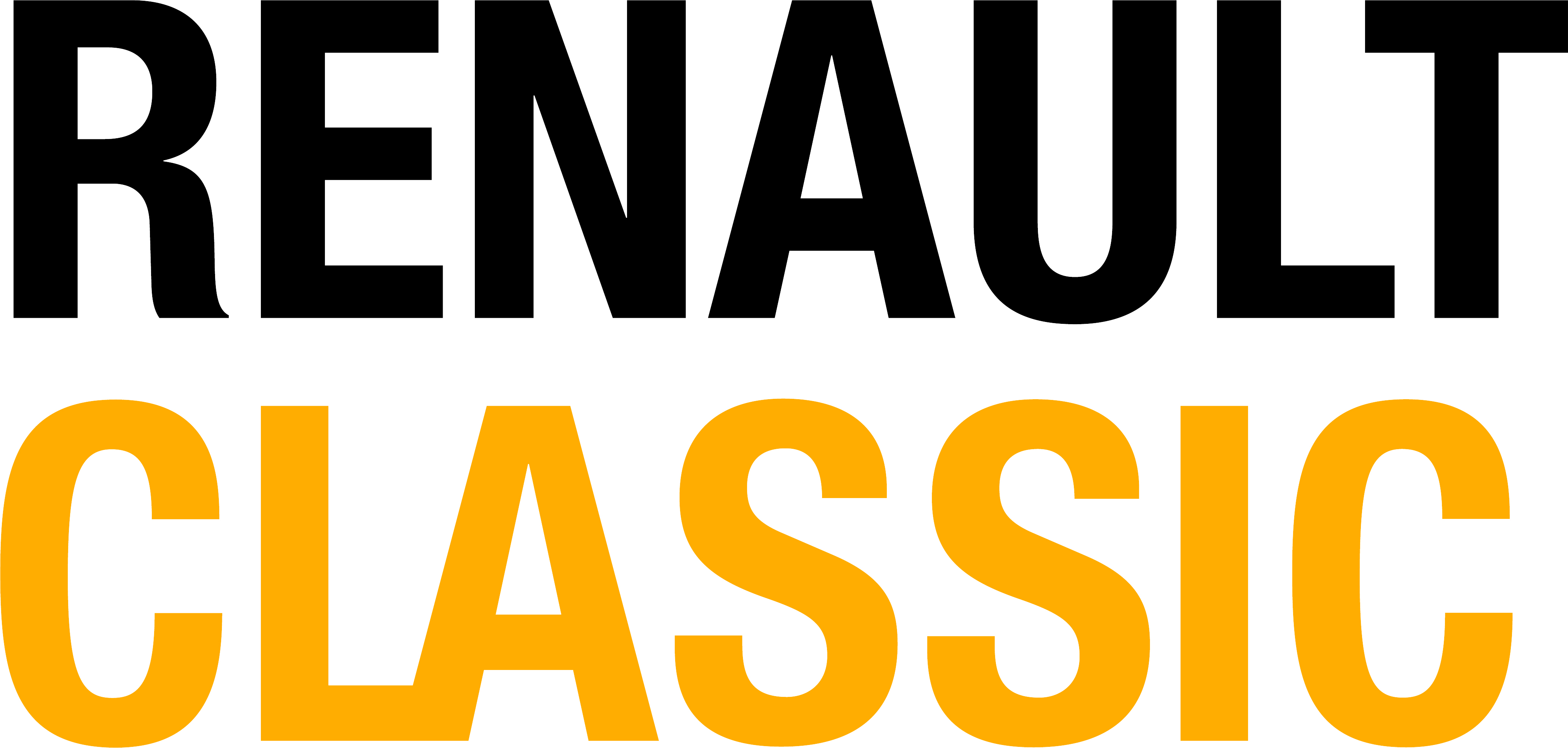
- Company type: Division
- Predecessor: Renault Histoire et Collection
- Founded: 2011; 15 years ago
- Headquarters: Le Plessis-Robinson (Hauts-de-Seine) and Flins (Yvelines), France
- Number of employees: 13
- Parent: Renault SAS, division= Nissan
- Website: http://fr.renaultclassic.com/

Renault Classic is a department within the Marketing and Communications Branch of the French automobile brand Renault. This department preserves, renovates and exhibits historical Renault vehicles. Until 2011, the Renault Classic department was called Renault Histoire et Collection. Prior to moving to Plessis-Robinson, the collection was based Boulogne-Billancourt, in the western suburbs of Paris, France. The technical division is located in the Renault Flins factory.

== Operations ==
The Renault Classic team is made of 13 people spread over the communication pole (5 people at Plessis-Robinson) and the technical pole (8 people at Flins). These 2 poles work every day together.

In 2013 Renault Classic led 120 operations. Every year, almost 500 cars have been exhibited during the events organized. More than 3,400,000 people could admire the vehicles from the collection during the year 2013.

== Renault Classic's role ==
Created in the mid-1980s, the Renault Classic department preserve and share Renault's history. The team shows the pieces of the collection during various events, including the Renault Sport Series (formerly World Series by Renault), Le Mans Classic, Goodwood Festival of Speed, and the Paris Motor Show (French: Mondial de l’Automobile).

At the beginning, in this department there was only volunteers and retired Renault staff. Now, the department is separated in two poles counting 13 people.

The technical pole, composed of personnel selected in the firm, maintains and prepares the vehicles for the various shows. The team located in Flins factory can repair the very first vehicles from Renault as well as its F1 cars.

The team located in Plessis-Robinson manages the relationship with the Renault or Alpine fan clubs and prepares the public events which take place all year round.

During the shows, exhibitions or meetings, Renault Classic is surrounded by professional drivers as Jean Ragnotti but also by volunteers.

== The collection ==
The Renault collection, conserved by Renault Classic, consists of over 740 vehicles retracing the history of the Group back to its creation in 1898. From old to new models and mass-produced vehicles to racing cars, the collection includes automobiles such as the Marne Taxis, NN, Juvaquatre, 4CV, Floride, Estafette, Renault 4 and Renault 5…

The collection also features a number of curiosities, including concept cars from all periods, a metro wagon fit on tires, two open-platform buses, two locomotives, a panoramic train, and an FT tank from the First World War. These treasures express the inventiveness and expertise displayed by Renault for more than a century.

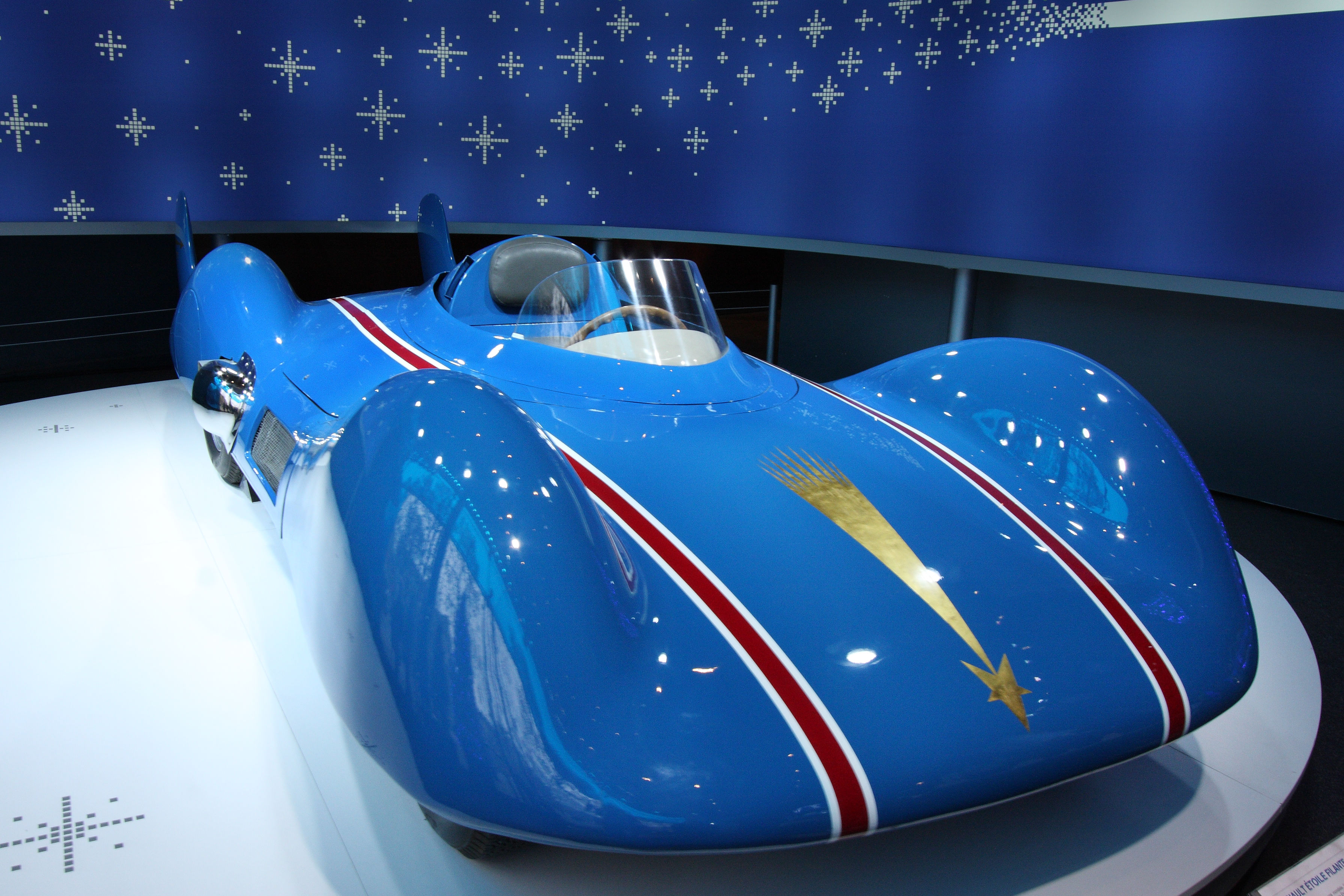
Etoile Filante (1956)

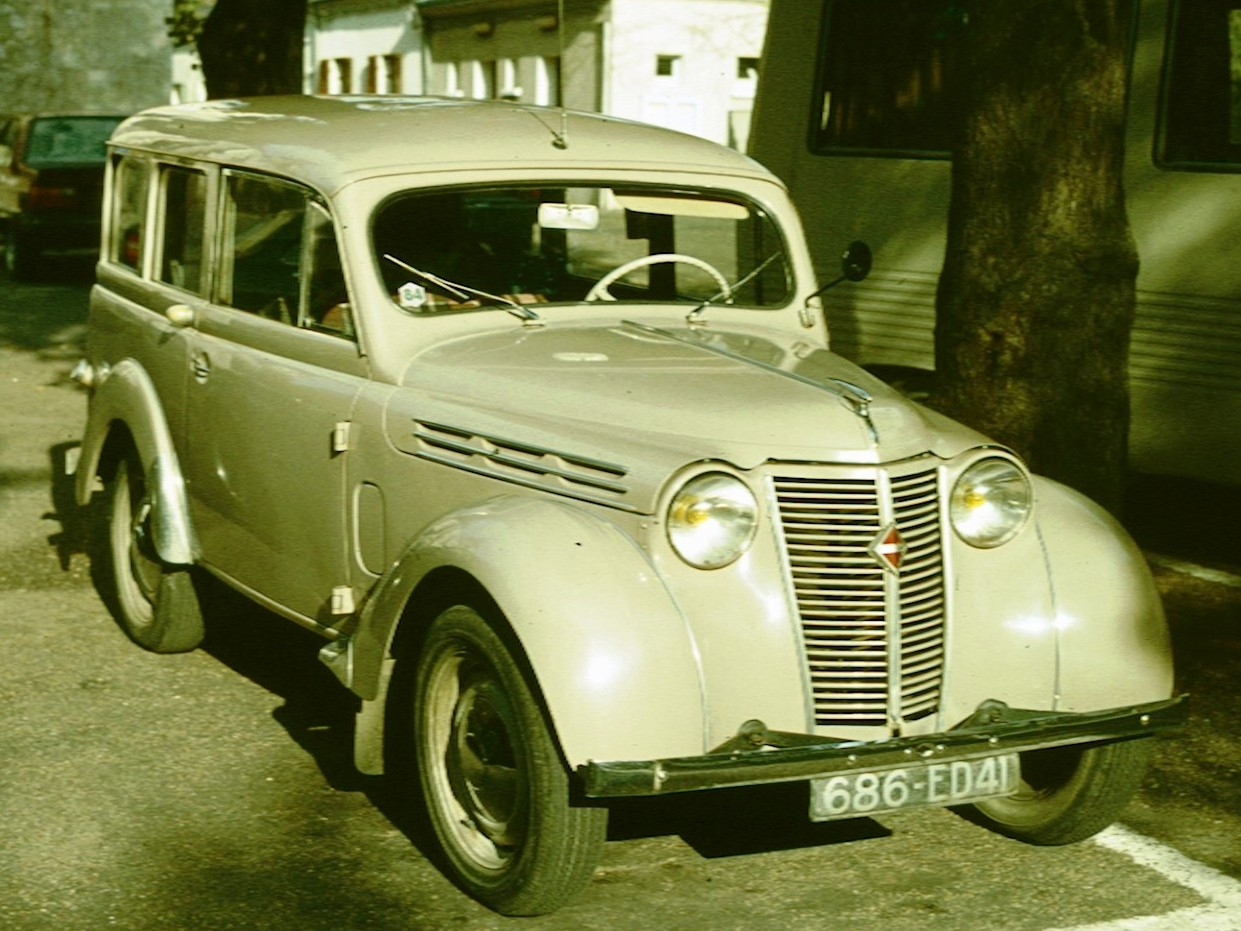
Renault Juvaquatre (1960)

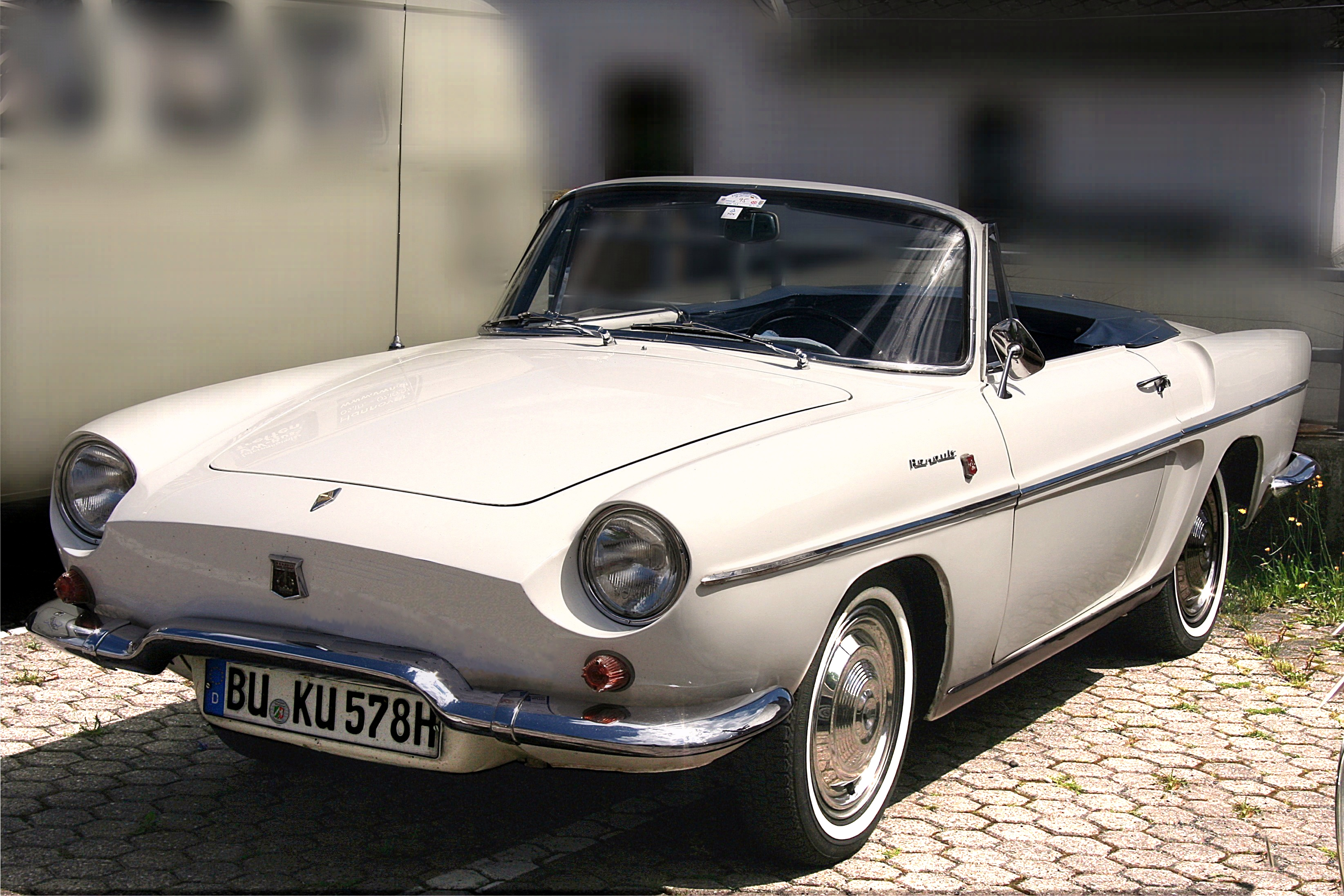
Renault Floride (1961)

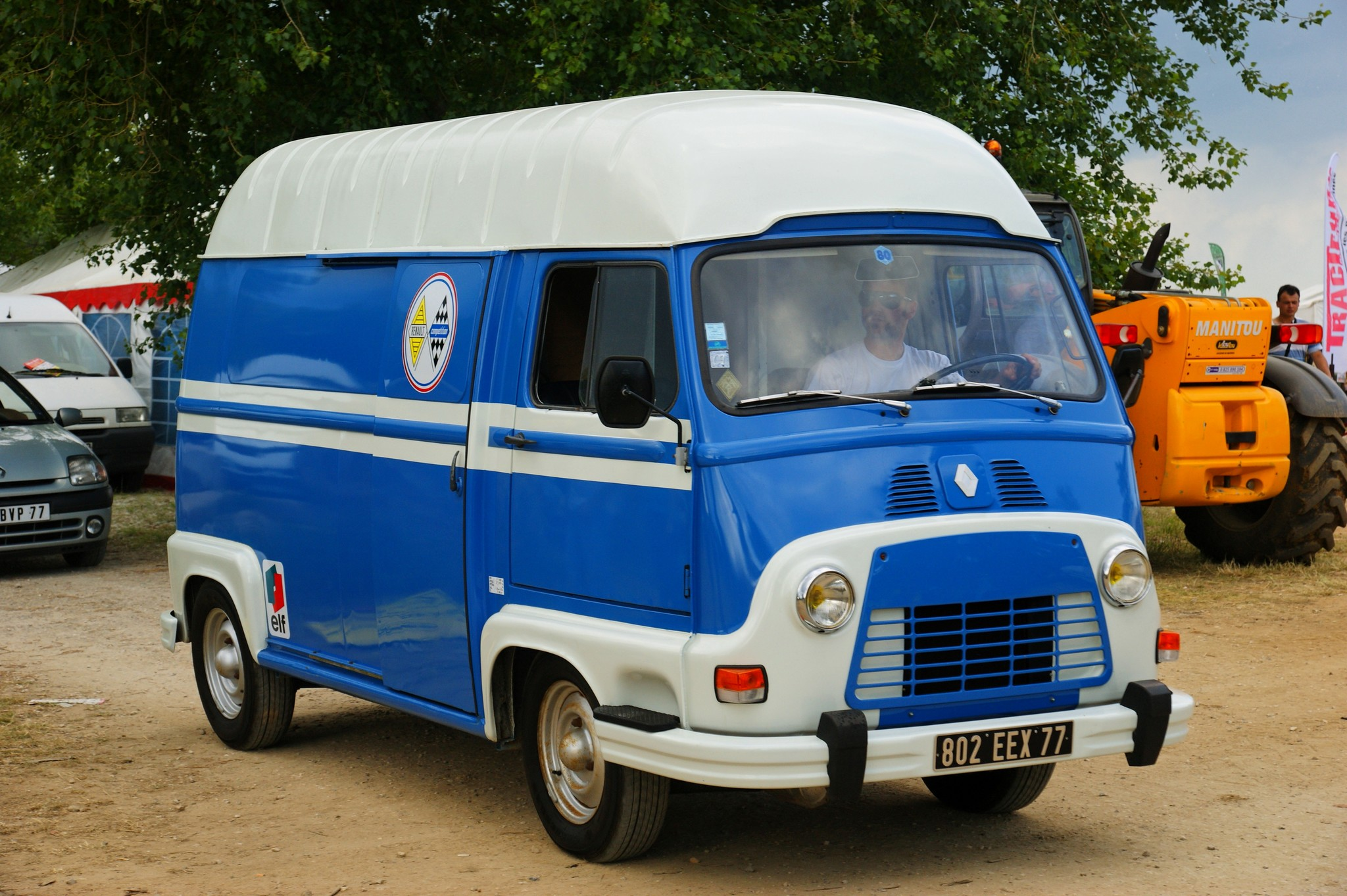
Estafette (1964)

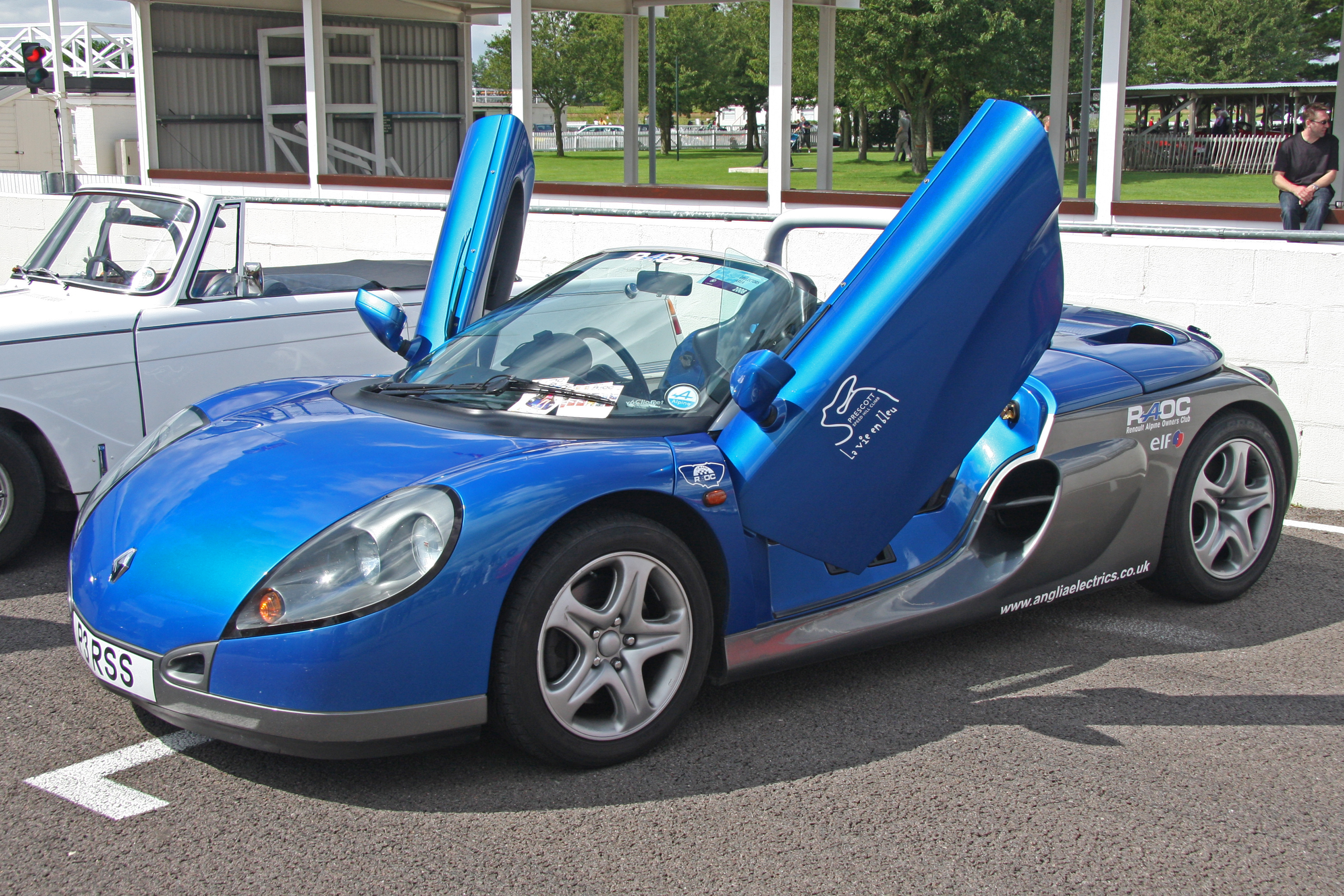
Renault Spider (1998)

This large collection is complemented by documentary archives representing several thousand meters of shelvings, more than 3200 miniatures and toys, 2200 posters, 270 scale models and pedal cars, and also various items.

Renault Classic highlights regularly the collection across Europe during exhibitions, motor shows, historical courses, reports, sport events, to keep it alive (World Series by Renault, Le Mans Classic, Goodwood Festival of Speed, Salons Automobile…).

== See also ==
- Louis Renault
- Jean Ragnotti
- Renault
- Renault Sport
- Renault F1 Team
- WSR

== Bibliography ==
Renault La collection, Antoine Pascal, éditions EPA
