= De Montesquiou family =

French noble family

de Montesquiou
- French noble family
- Or, two torteaux gules, one above the other.
- Country: France
- Origin: Gascony

The de Montesquiou family is a French noble family stemming from Montesquiou in Gascony whose documented filiation traces back to circa 1190. In the 18th century, the family was recognized as coming in the 11th century from the Counts of Fezensac (extinct in the 12th century). The Montesquiou family split into several branches, of which only the d'Artagnan branch now remains.

== Origins ==
The first ancestor of proven genealogy is Raimond-Aimeri de Montesquiou, who died in 1090, grandfather of the Raymond III, baron of Montesquiou, who took part in the Third Crusade with king Philippe Auguste and died around 1190.

In the proceedings of the cartulary of Auch (copies from the 13th century), Raymond-Aimeri, first baron of Montesquiou is described around 1096 as the younger brother of Guillaume Astanove Count of Fezensac.

The barons of Montesquiou were vassals of their cousins, the counts of Armagnac, who rose to become the most powerful feudal family in medieval France and championed Joan of Arc (known as "the Armagnac spinster" by her enemies) during the Hundred Years' War. After the destruction of the Armagnac by King Louis XI, the Montesquiou split their allegiance, with the senior branch following the king of France, and the junior branches following the king of Navarre. Several Montesquiou were ruthless military commanders during the French Wars of Religion, including Francois de Montesquiou, last baron of the senior branch, who murdered the prince de Condé at the battle of Jarnac, and the marquis of Montluc, field-marshal. When King Henri III of Navarre became King Henri IV of France, the cadet branch of d'Artagnan rose to prominence in court and played a major role in the Musketeers, including Joseph de Montesquiou d'Artagnan, captain of the musketeers and Pierre de Montesquiou d'Artagnan, field marshal. The famous d'Artagnan, who inspired the Three Musketeers novel, was their first cousin. Though not a Montesquiou, he took his name from his mother, Francoise de Montesquiou d'Artagnan, because it was more famous in court.

In 1777, the Montesquiou family was recognized as descending from the counts of Fezensac and Louis XVI allowed them to change their name to "de Montesquiou-Fezensac", The head of the family was appointed duke de Fezensac.

The Montesquiou distinguished themselves in the Crusades, the French war of religions, and as commanders of the musketeers. The Montesquiou family produced three field marshals (including two in the de Montluc family whose link as a branch is contested by some authors), one admiral, one cardinal, one archbishop, several generals, bishops, diplomats and one minister.

The marquis Anne-Pierre de Montesquiou-Fézensac played an important role in the French Revolution as a member of Parliament, renouncing noble privileges and later voting to behead king Louis XVI. As a general, he conquered the region of Savoie, annexed to France. His older son, Elisabeth-Pierre de Montesquiou, joined Lafayette in the American war of Independence. His younger son, Henri, was a colonel in the army of Napoleon and fought at Waterloo. Their remote cousin, the Duke de Fezesanc, François-Xavier-Marc-Antoine de Montesquiou-Fézensac from the Marsan branch of the family, was a powerful political figure during the Restoration period. Count Robert de Montesquiou, a famous dandy at the turn of the 20th century, inspired Marcel Proust. His portrait by Whistler is at the Frick Collection in New York. His portrait by Antonio de La Gandara is at the Château d'Azay-le-Feron in France.

== Titles ==
Titles of the now-extinct Marsan line:

- Baron of the Empire (1809)
- Count of Montesquiou (1817)
- Duke of Fezensac in 1821 and 1832. The title died out in 1913 with Philippe André, third duke of Fezensac)

Titles of the d'Artagnan line:

- Count of the Empire (1809 and 1810)
- Baron of the Empire (1809 and 1810)
- Baron-pair (1824)

== Notable members ==
- Bernard de Montesquiou (+1175) Bishop of Tarbes;
- Raymond-Aimeri de Montesquiou (fl. 1190), participant in the Third Crusade, first ancestor of proven parentage
- Pierre Cardinal de Montesquiou (+1262), Cardinal of Albi;
- Pictavin Cardinal de Montesquiou (+1355/6), Bishop of Albi;
- Pierre de Montesquiou d'Artagnan, (1645–1725), musketeer and maréchal de France;
- Henri Jacques de Montesquiou de Puylobon (1710–1777), Bishop of Sarlat;
- Anne-Pierre de Montesquiou-Fézensac (1739–1798), general and politician, member of the French Academy, he joined the Third Estate during the French Revolution;
- François-Xavier-Marc-Antoine de Montesquiou-Fézensac (1756–1832), duke, French politician;
- Raymond Aymeric Philippe Joseph de Montesquiou-Fezenzac, French soldier;
- Anatole de Montesquiou-Fezenzac (born in 1788), French soldier;
- Bertrand de Montesquiou-Fézenzac (1837–1902), French admiral;
- Robert de Montesquiou (1855–1921), writer, poet, art collector;
- Léon de Montesquiou (1873–1915), essayist, French monarchist;
- Mathilde de Montesquiou-Fézenzac (1884–1960), wife of the composer Charles-Marie Widor;
- Aymeri de Montesquiou, contemporary French politician;
- Alfred de Montesquiou, contemporary French journalist;
