= Le Plessis-Robinson =

- Commune
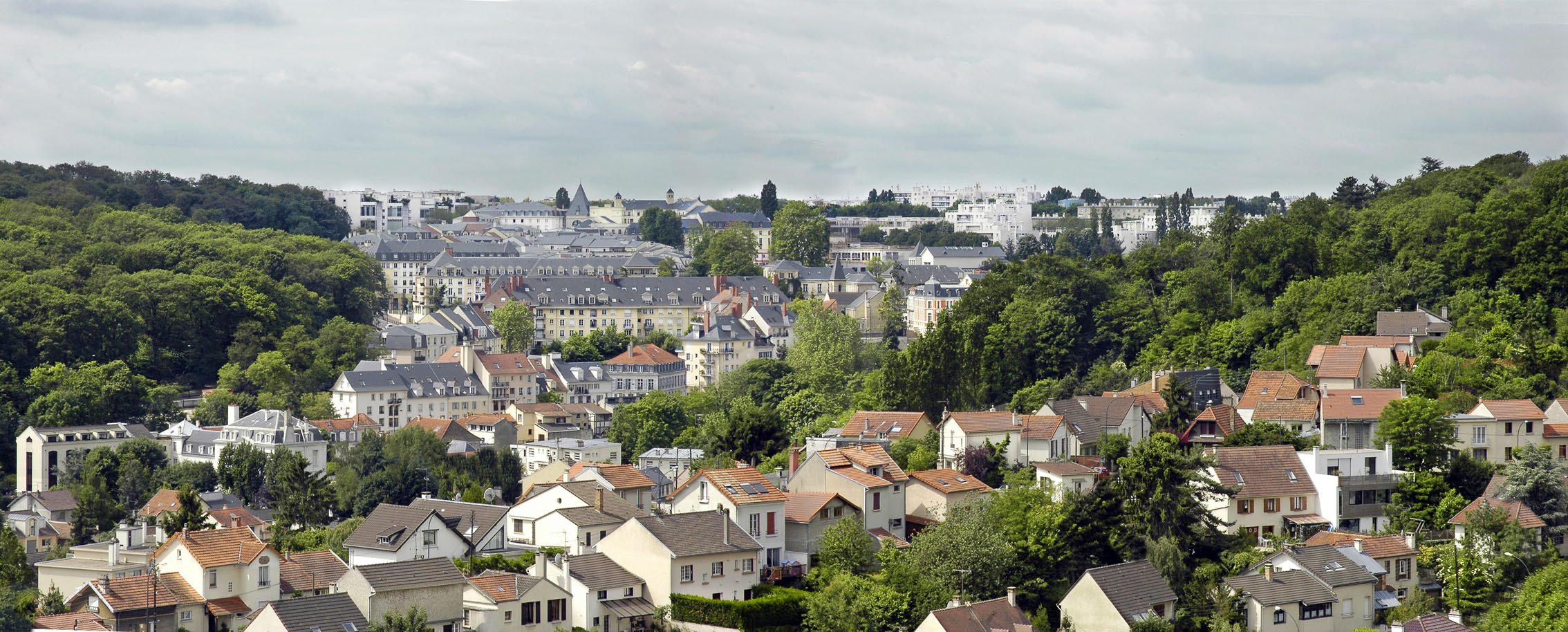
- Le Plessis-Robinson, panorama

- Coat of arms

- Location (in red) within Paris inner suburbs
- Location of Le Plessis-Robinson
- Location within France Location within Île-de-France (region)
- Coordinates: 48°46′52″N 2°15′48″E
- Country: France
- Region: Île-de-France
- Department: Hauts-de-Seine
- Arrondissement: Antony
- Canton: Châtenay-Malabry
- Intercommunality: Grand Paris

Government
  - Mayor (2026–32): Philippe Pemezec
- Area^{1}: 3.43 km^{2} (1.32 sq mi)
- Elevation: 170 m (560 ft)
- Highest elevation: 172 m (564 ft)
- Lowest elevation: 86 m (282 ft)
- Population (2023): 28,848
  - Density: 8,410/km^{2} (21,800/sq mi)
- Time zone: UTC+01:00 (CET)
  - Summer (DST): UTC+02:00 (CEST)
- INSEE/Postal code: 92060 /92350
- ^{1} French Land Register data, which excludes lakes, ponds, glaciers > 1 km^{2} (0.386 sq mi or 247 acres) and river estuaries.

Le Plessis-Robinson (French pronunciation: [lə plɛsi ʁɔbɛ̃sɔ̃]) is a commune in the southwestern suburbs of Paris, France. It is located 10.5 km (6.5 mi) from the centre of Paris. As of 2023, it has 28,848 inhabitants.

== History ==
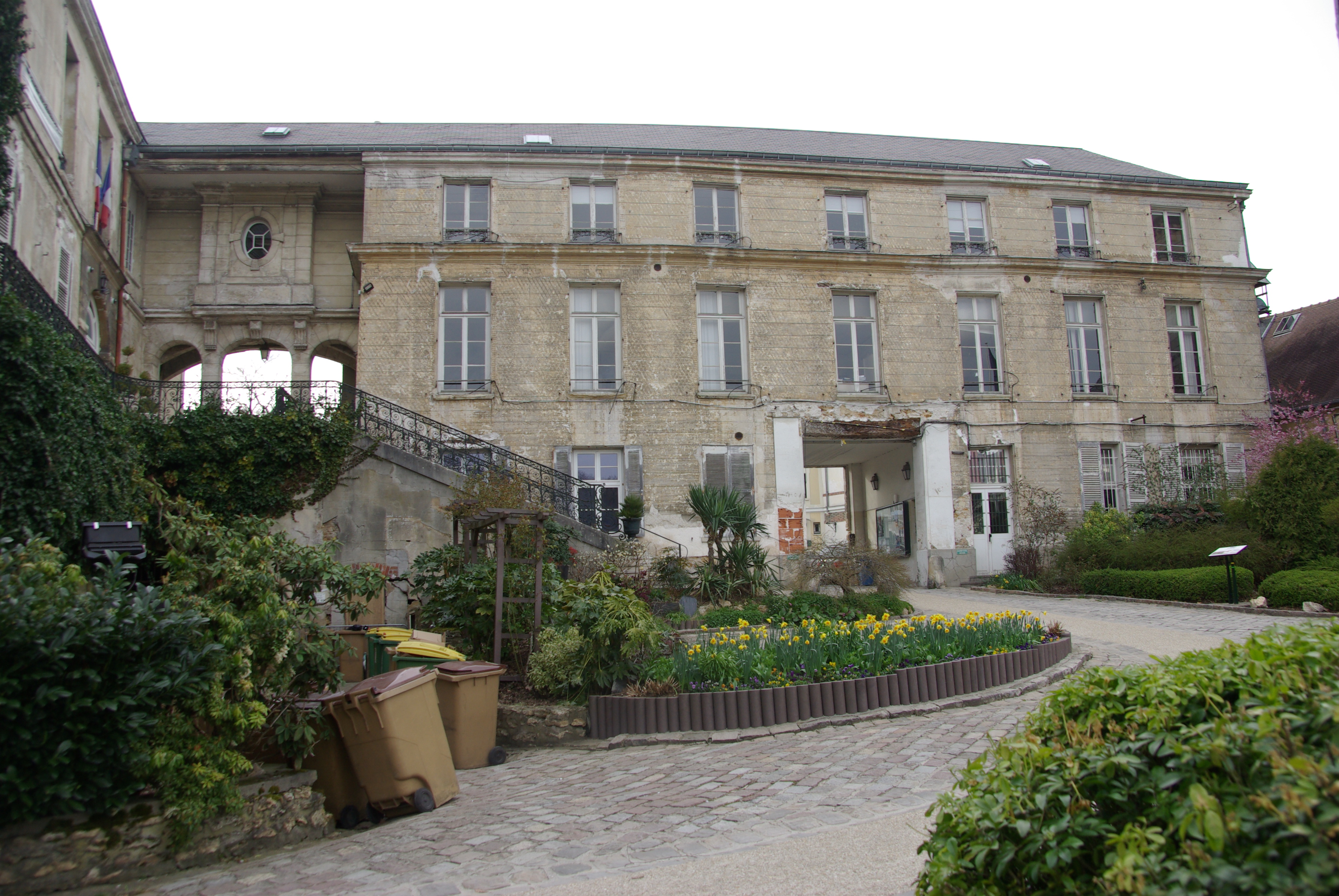
The Château du Plessis-Robinson

Plessis was first mentioned in 839 as Plessiacus apud Castanetum, meaning plessis near Castanetum. A plessis was a village surrounded by a fence made of branches. In 1112 the village church was founded, of which the romanesque tower still survives as the oldest monument in Le Plessis. At the end of the 12th Century, the village was renamed Le Plessis-Raoul, after the local lord Raoul, chamberlain of king Philip II of France. In 1407 it came into the hands of Jean Piquet de La Haye, who built the Château du Plessis-Robinson in the village in about 1412, now called Le Plessis-Piquet .

In 1614 a monastery of the Congregation of the Feuillants was built in the village. In 1682 Jean-Baptiste Colbert, Minister of Finances under Louis XIV had a pond dug which fed the fountains of the nearby Château de Sceaux. Pierre de Montesquiou d'Artagnan purchased the Château du Plessis-Robinson in 1699, and expanded the gardens. In 1790, as a result of the French Revolution, Antoine Moullé was elected the first mayor of Le Plessis. The commune was renamed Le Plessis-Liberté. The monastery was nationalised and demolished.

The commune's name reverted to Le Plessis-Piquet in 1801. In 1848, a guinguette (cabaret) was established in the area as a suite of interconnected tree houses. It was named Le grand Robinson after the tree house described in Swiss Family Robinson, a novel itself named after Robinson Crusoe. Several other popular establishments arose in the area and remained popular until the 1960s. In 1909, the commune of Le Plessis-Piquet was officially renamed Le Plessis-Robinson, after Le grand Robinson. In 1854, Louis Hachette bought the Château du Plessis-Robinson and the grounds. He later became the mayor of Le Plessis-Piquet and a city councillor. The village and the Château du Plessis-Robinson were ruined in the Franco-Prussian War, but the château was rebuilt by the Hachette family. It became the Hôtel de Ville in 1931.

== Population ==
Historical population

| Year | Pop. | ±% p.a. |
|---|---|---|
| 1793 | 235 | — |
| 1800 | 267 | +1.84% |
| 1806 | 245 | −1.42% |
| 1821 | 199 | −1.38% |
| 1831 | 217 | +0.87% |
| 1836 | 201 | −1.52% |
| 1841 | 234 | +3.09% |
| 1846 | 192 | −3.88% |
| 1851 | 259 | +6.17% |
| 1856 | 271 | +0.91% |
| 1861 | 321 | +3.44% |
| 1866 | 338 | +1.04% |
| 1872 | 266 | −3.91% |
| 1876 | 326 | +5.22% |
| 1881 | 348 | +1.31% |
| 1886 | 407 | +3.18% |
| 1891 | 397 | −0.50% |
| 1896 | 475 | +3.65% |
| 1901 | 549 | +2.94% |

| Year | Pop. | ±% p.a. |
|---|---|---|
| 1906 | 611 | +2.16% |
| 1911 | 686 | +2.34% |
| 1921 | 1,027 | +4.12% |
| 1926 | 2,299 | +17.49% |
| 1931 | 4,713 | +15.44% |
| 1936 | 7,779 | +10.54% |
| 1946 | 10,118 | +2.66% |
| 1954 | 13,163 | +3.34% |
| 1962 | 18,449 | +4.31% |
| 1968 | 22,590 | +3.43% |
| 1975 | 22,231 | −0.23% |
| 1982 | 21,271 | −0.63% |
| 1990 | 21,289 | +0.01% |
| 1999 | 21,618 | +0.17% |
| 2007 | 23,242 | +0.91% |
| 2012 | 28,673 | +4.29% |
| 2017 | 29,100 | +0.30% |
| 2023 | 28,848 | −0.14% |

Source: EHESS and INSEE (1968-2023)

== New Urbanism ==
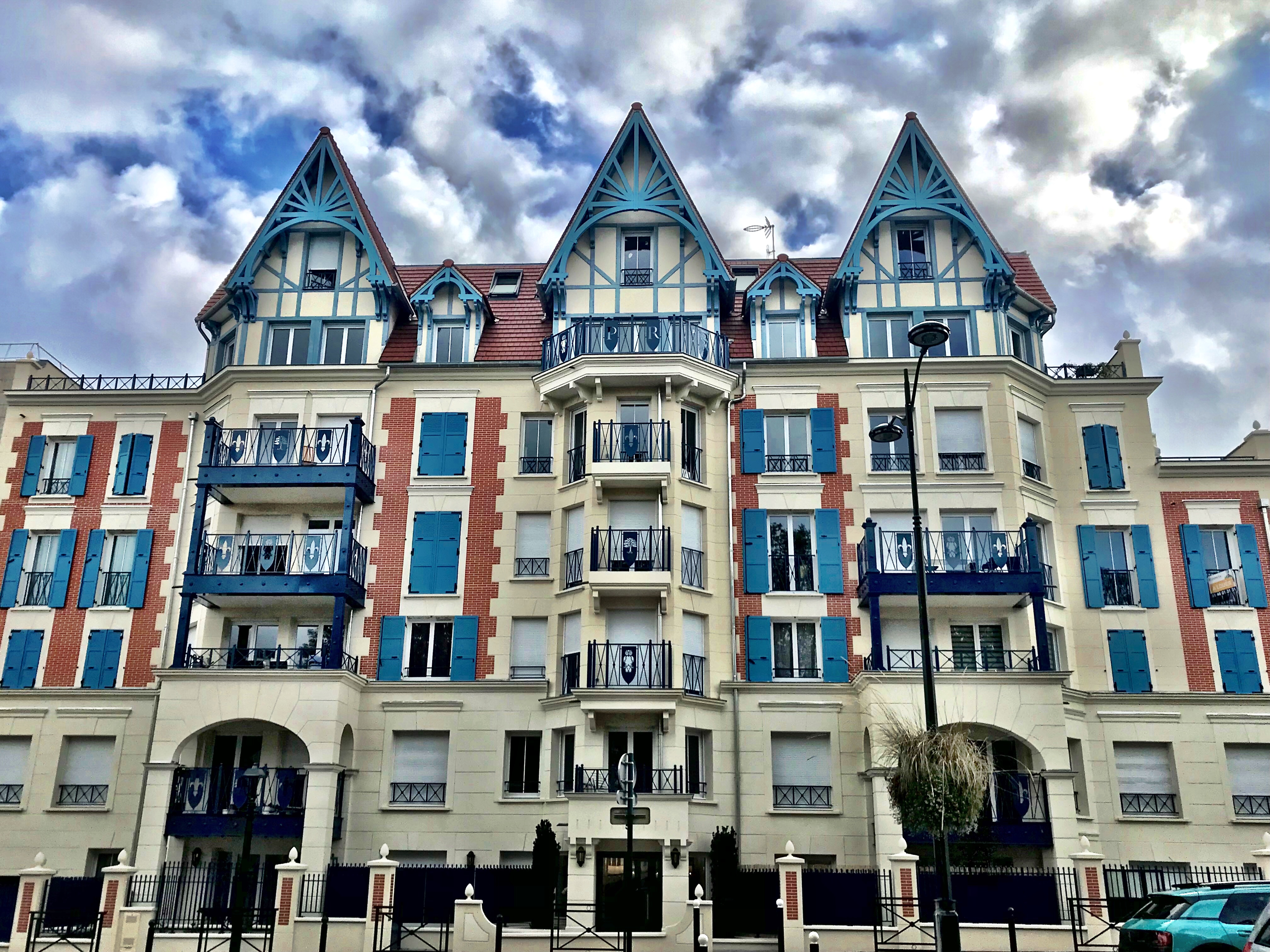
New Urbanism in Le Plessis-Robinson

In 2023 Le Plessis-Robinson is considered as the most significant project of New Urbanism in France. Philippe Pemezec, mayor between 1989 and 2018, started a project to reshape the city, in collaboration with the architects Marc & Nada Breitman, winners of the 2018 Driehaus Prize and part of the New Classical movement.

== Transport ==
Le Plessis-Robinson is not served by the Paris Métro, RER, or the suburban rail network. The closest station to Le Plessis-Robinson is Robinson station on Paris RER line B. This station is located in the neighbouring commune of Sceaux, 1.5 km (0.93 mi) from the town centre of Le Plessis-Robinson.

== Education ==
Le Plessis-Robinson has a variety of early childhood and primary education facilities. The commune manages six public nurseries (crèches) alongside four private nurseries.

Primary education is provided across eight school groups containing both kindergarten (maternelle) and elementary (élémentaire) branches, including Anatole-France, François-Peatrik, Henri-Wallon, Joliot-Curie, Jean-Jaurès, La Ferme, Louis-Hachette, and Louis-Pergaud.

Secondary education is served by two junior high schools (collèges)—Collège Romain-Rolland and Collège Claude-Nicolas Ledoux—and one high school (lycée), Lycée Montesquieu.

== Sites of interest ==
- Château park

== Twin towns ==
Le Plessis-Robinson is twinned with the following towns:

- Woking, United Kingdom
- Arabkir, Yerevan, Armenia

== See also ==
- Communes of the Hauts-de-Seine department
