= Château du Plessis-Robinson =

Town hall in Le Plessis-Robinson, France

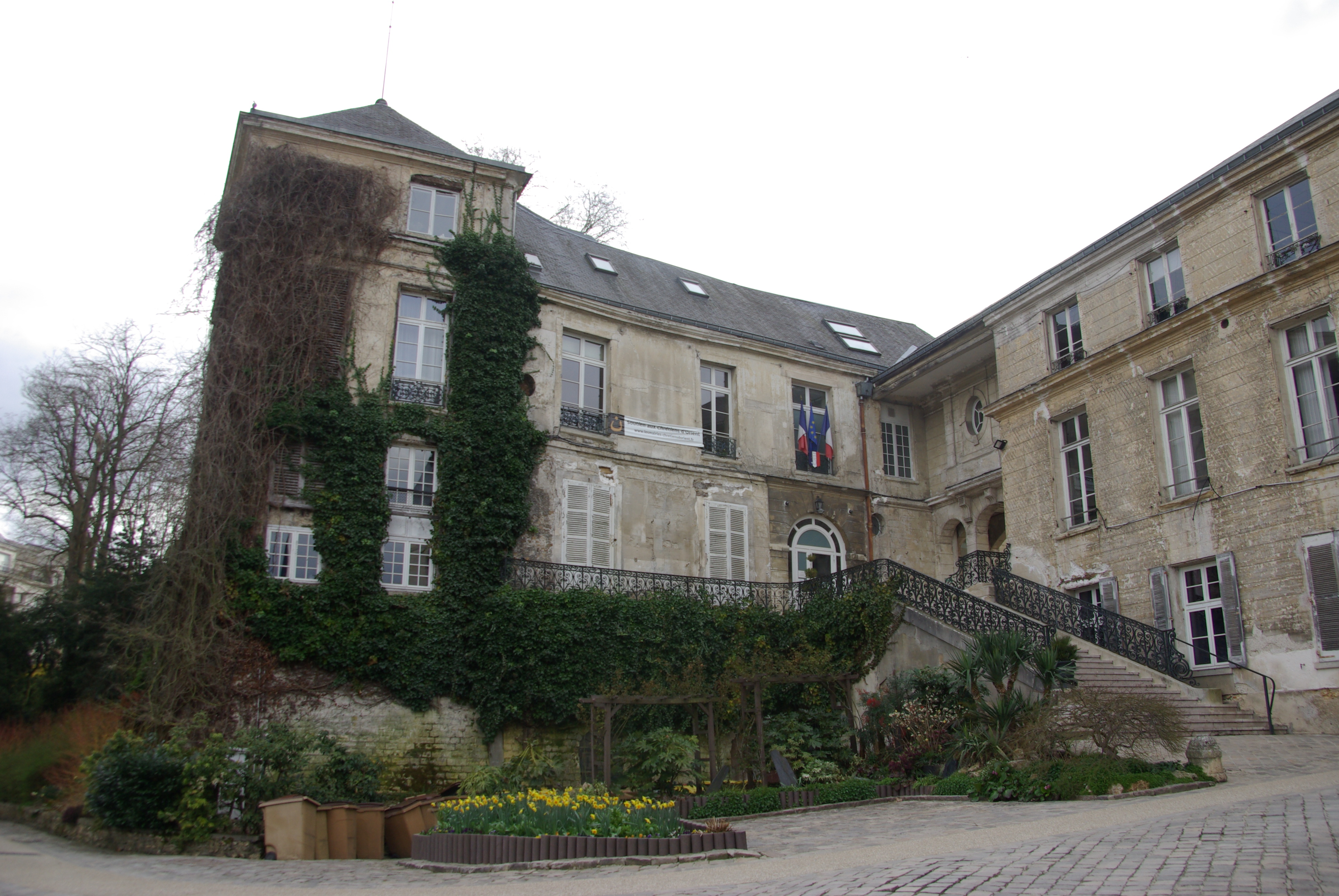
- The main frontage of the Château du Plessis-Robinson in April 2018
- Interactive map of the Château du Plessis-Robinson area

General information
- Type: City hall
- Architectural style: Neoclassical style
- Location: Le Plessis-Robinson, France
- Coordinates: 48.7821°N 2.2622°E
- Completed: 1412

The Château du Plessis-Robinson is a municipal building in Le Plessis-Robinson, Hauts-de-Seine in the southwestern suburbs of Paris, standing on Rue de la Mairie. It has been included on the Inventaire général des monuments by the French Ministry of Culture since 1991.

== History ==
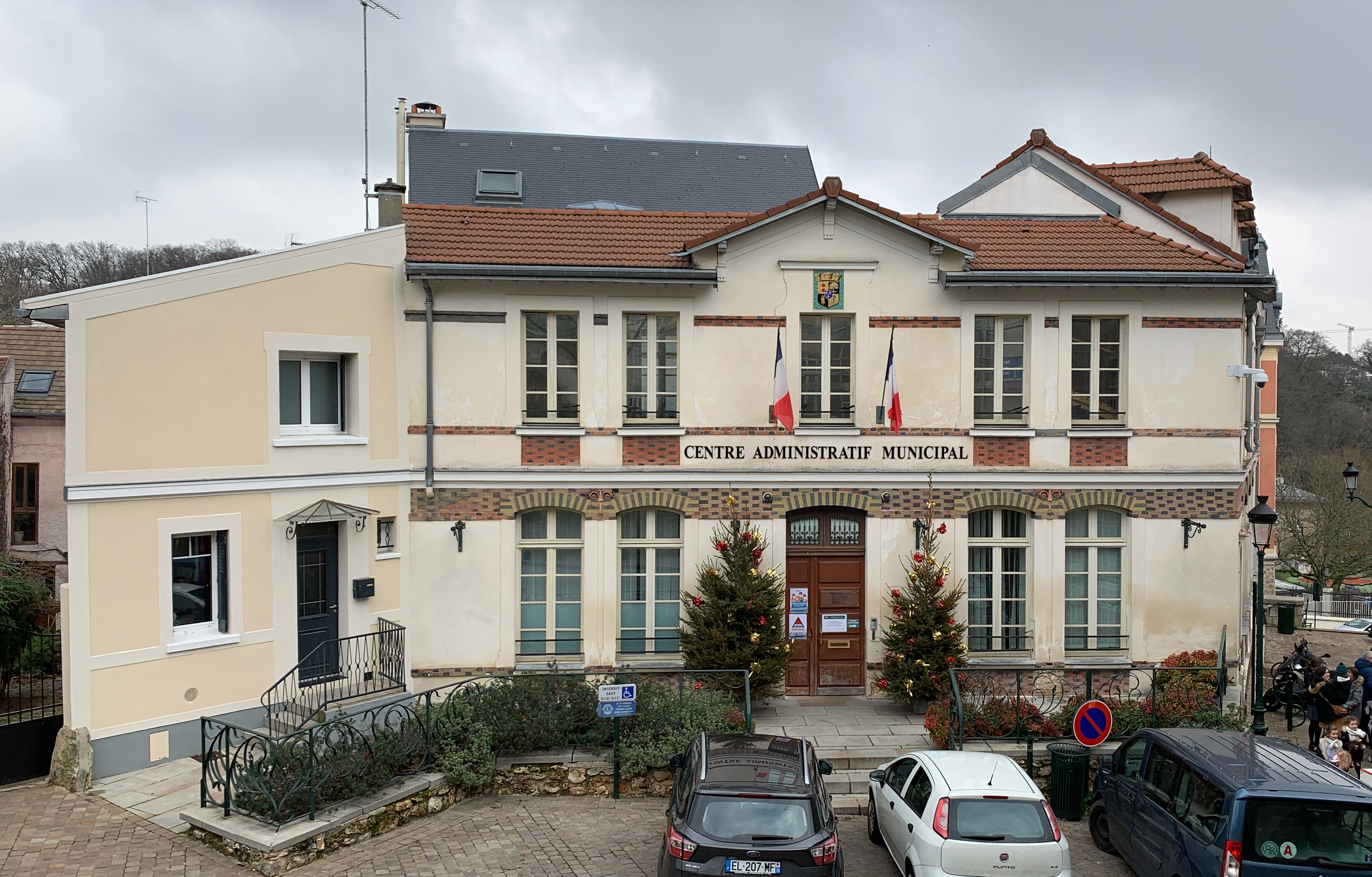
The old town hall

Following the French Revolution, the town council of Le Plessis-Piquet initially met in the house of the mayor at the time. This arrangement continued until 1840 when a combined town hall and school was established on the north side of what is now Rue de la Mairie. The combined town hall and school was replaced by a new building to a design by Jacques-Paul Lequeux in 1884. The design involved a symmetrical main frontage of five bays facing onto Rue de la Mairie. The central bay featured a segmental headed doorway on the ground floor, a square headed window on the first floor and a gable above. The other bays were fenestrated in a similar style. After it was no longer required for use as the town hall, the building served as a post office before becoming the council's administrative centre.

Following significant population growth, in the early 1930s, the council led by the mayor, Alfred Louis Delassue, decided to acquire a more substantial municipal building for the town, by then known as Le Plessis-Robinson. The building they selected was the Château du Plessis-Robinson which was just to the east of the old town hall. The château had been commissioned by the treasurer to King Charles VI and local seigneur, Jean Piquet de La Haye, in the early 15th century.

The château was designed in the neoclassical style, built in ashlar stone and was completed in 1412. The original design involved a long east-facing main block together with a wing which was projected out to the front at the south end of the main block. After the French defeat at the siege of Harfleur in 1415 during the Hundred Years' War, King Henry VI of England seized the château and gave it to one of his supporters, Guillaume de Dangueil in 1423. It then passed to the Charles family in 1426, to the Potier family in 1609 and to an advisor to King Louis XIV, Charles Levasseur, in 1663, before being acquired by the Secretary of State for the Navy, Jean-Baptiste Colbert, in 1682.

The château was later acquired by a carpet factory proprietor, Sébastien François de La Planche, in 1683. De la Planche commissioned a garden, laid out to the plans of Jacques de Marne, in front of the building. The building was then acquired by a marshal of France, Pierre de Montesquiou d'Artagnan, in 1699. D'Artagnan, whose cousin, Charles de Batz de Castelmore d'Artagnan, was the basis for a character in the novel The Three Musketeers by Alexandre Dumas, commissioned a terrace in front of the building.

Subsequent purchasers included a wealthy lawyer, Pierre Goblet, in 1755, an official in the household of King Louis XV, Nicolas Mathieu du Trou, in 1763, and a librarian to King Louis XVI, Jérôme Frédéric Bignon, in 1776. Bignon commissioned an archway, which pierced the main block, as well as an orangery. He was succeeded as owner by a French Guards officer, Louis Dugas, in 1785.

After the French Revolution owners included a merchant, Louis Zenobio, from 1801, a military quartermaster, Jacques du Breton, from 1803, and then a series of politicians: Claude Ambroise Régnier, from 1808, Jean-Baptiste Collin de Sussy, from 1817, and Jacques-Antoine Odier, from 1827. Finally, in 1854, it was bought by the publisher, Louis Hachette, who made improvements to the south wing and added an external staircase leading up to a round headed entrance in the right bay of that wing. He also had the building fully restored after it was occupied by Prussian troops during the Franco-Prussian War of 1870. The château remained in his family until it was acquired by the Office public départemental des habitations à bon marché (the Department of Social Housing) in 1917. It was subsequently converted for municipal use in 1931.

A statue depicting D'Artagnan was created by the sculptor, Julien Charton, and installed in front of the building in 2000, and a major programme of refurbishment works, involving substantial repairs to the external stonework, was completed in 2022.
