= Aymeri de Montesquiou =

French politician

Aymeri de Montesquiou-Fezensac (born 7 July 1942 in Marsan, Gers) was a member of the Senate of France, representing the Gers department. He is a member of the Union of Democrats and Independents. Since 1976, he has been the mayor of Marsan. He is president of the Franco-Iranian Friendship organisation.

He was allowed to change his name to Aymeri de Montesquiou-Fezensac d'Artagnan on 18 May 2011, in honour of his ancestor, Charles de Batz de Castelmore d'Artagnan, fictionalised by Alexandre Dumas as one of The Three Musketeers.
