= Pierre de Montesquiou d'Artagnan =

Marshal of France

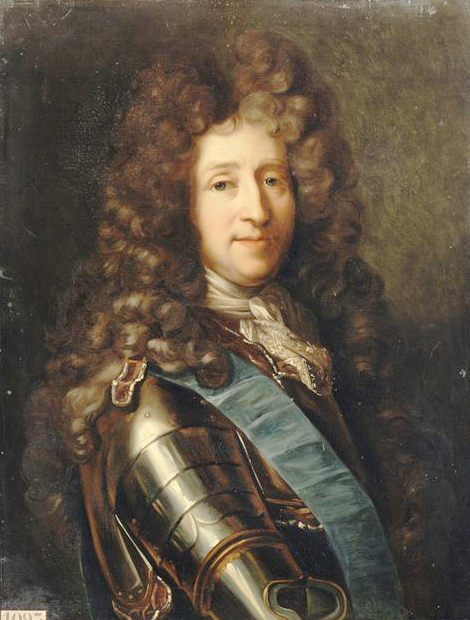
Pierre de Montesquiou, comte d'Artagnan

Pierre de Montesquiou, comte d'Artagnan and later comte de Montesquiou (1640 – 12 August 1725) was a French soldier and Marshal of France.

A scion of the famous French Montesquiou family, he was the fourth son of Henri I de Montesquiou, seigneur d'Artagnan by his wife Jeanne, daughter of Jean de Gassion. He was also the cousin of Charles de Batz de Castelmore, to whom he lent one of his titles, comte d'Artagnan, on whom the hero of Alexandre Dumas, père's D'Artagnan Romances was based.

Montesquiou served for twenty-three years as a musketeer in the Gardes Françaises before being made brigadier in 1688. He was further promoted to maréchal de camp in 1691 and lieutenant général on 3 January 1696. He married Elizabeth L’Hermite in 1700, before being made Maréchal de France on 15 September 1709 as a reward for his distinguished conduct at the Battle of Malplaquet on 11 September, at which he was wounded and had three horses shot under him. He is largely credited for winning the battle of Denain, which saved the French military in its fight against the coalition led by the duke of Marlborough.

He lived at the Château du Plessis-Robinson from 1699 until his death in 1725.
