= Montesquiou =

- Commune
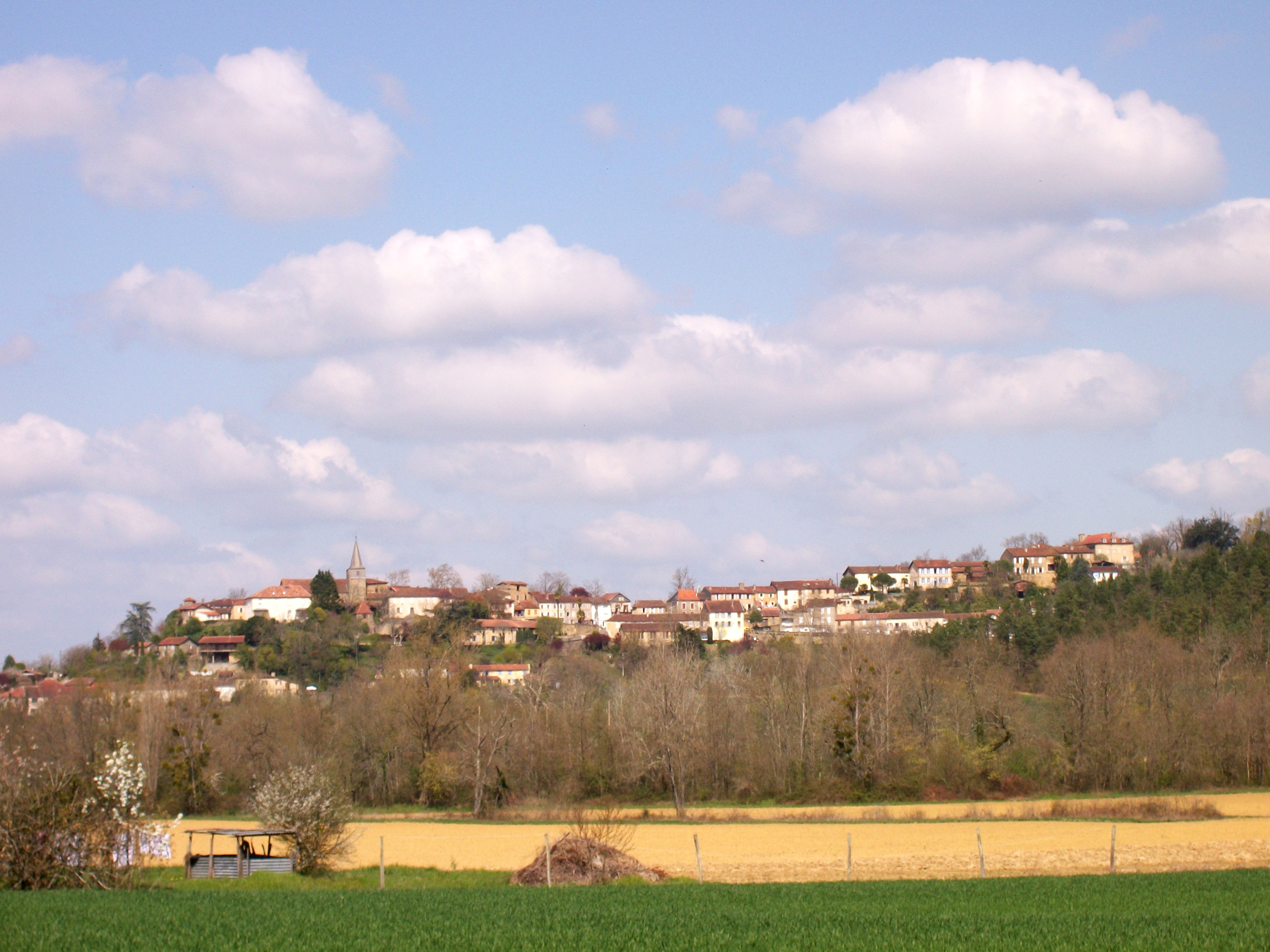
- A general view of Montesquiou

- Coat of arms
- Location of Montesquiou
- Location within France Location within Occitanie
- Coordinates: 43°34′46″N 0°19′47″E
- Country: France
- Region: Occitania
- Department: Gers
- Arrondissement: Mirande
- Canton: Pardiac-Rivière-Basse
- Intercommunality: Cœur d'Astarac en Gascogne

Government
  - Mayor (2020–2026): Étienne Verret
- Area^{1}: 46.8 km^{2} (18.1 sq mi)
- Elevation: 277 m (909 ft)
- Highest elevation: 256 m (840 ft)
- Lowest elevation: 145 m (476 ft)
- Population (2023): 567
  - Density: 12.1/km^{2} (31.4/sq mi)
- Time zone: UTC+01:00 (CET)
  - Summer (DST): UTC+02:00 (CEST)
- INSEE/Postal code: 32285 /32320
- ^{1} French Land Register data, which excludes lakes, ponds, glaciers > 1 km^{2} (0.386 sq mi or 247 acres) and river estuaries.

Montesquiou (French pronunciation: [mɔ̃tɛskju]; Gascon: Montesquiu) is a commune in the Gers department, Southwestern France. It is the historic seat of the Montesquiou family.

== Geography ==
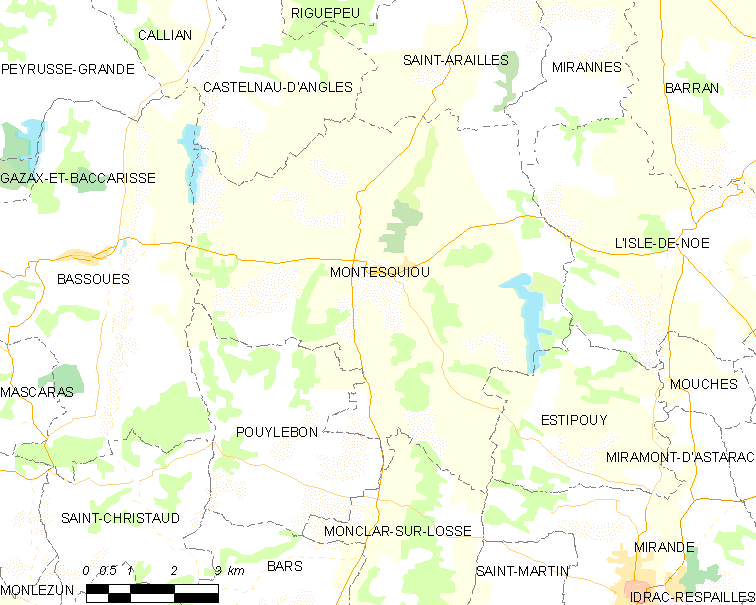
Montesquiou and its surrounding communes

== Population ==
Historical population
Year	Pop.	±% p.a.
1968	645	—
1975	605	−0.91%
1982	604	−0.02%
1990	579	−0.53%
1999	570	−0.17%
2007	589	+0.41%
2012	590	+0.03%
2017	581	−0.31%
2023	567	−0.41%
Source: INSEE

== See also ==
- Communes of the Gers department
