= Hauts-de-Seine's 4th constituency =

Constituency of the National Assembly of France

4th constituency of Hauts-de-Seine
- inline Constituency of the National Assembly of France

- Deputy: Sabrina Sebaihi; EELV
- Department: Hauts-de-Seine
- Cantons: Nanterre-1, Nanterre-2
- Registered voters: 76,175

The 4th constituency of the Hauts-de-Seine is a French legislative constituency in the Hauts-de-Seine département.

== Description ==
- From May 15, 1991 to March 31, 1992 and from April 4, 1992 to March 29, 1993, Michel Sapin was appointed Deputy Minister for Justice, then, on April 4, 1992, Minister of Finance. He is replaced by his substitute, Michel Thauvin.

== Deputies ==
Election	Member	Party
1967	Parfait Jans	PCF
1968	Charles Pasqua	UDR
1973	Parfait Jans	PCF
1978	Parfait Jans	PCF
1981	Parfait Jans	PCF
1986	Proportional representation – no election by constituency	
1988	Michel Sapin	PS
1992	Michel Thauvin	PS
1993	Christian Dupuy	RPR
1997	Jacqueline Fraysse	PCF
2002	Jacqueline Fraysse	PCF
2007	Jacqueline Fraysse	PCF
2012	Jacqueline Fraysse	PCF
2017	Isabelle Florennes	MoDem
2022	Sabrina Sebaihi	EELV

== Election results ==
=== 2024 ===
Candidate	Party	Alliance	First round			Second round		
Candidate	Party	Alliance	Votes	%	+/–	Votes	%	+/–
Sabrina Sebaihi	LÉ	NFP	26,373	49.13	+7.49	28,034	57.99	+6.99
Isabelle de Crecy	HOR	ENS	15,899	29.62	-7.33	20,309	42.01	-6.99
Melina Bravo	RN		8,185	15.25	+6.09			
Aurélie Vonsy	DVE		1,086	2.02	N/A			
Régis Valette	REC		758	1.41	-3.87			
Laurent Strumanne	LO		425	0.79	+0.11			
Mathilde Eisenberg	NPA		391	0.73	+0.28			
Valéry Barny	DIV		297	0.55	-0.17			
Sean Phillip McCoy	DIV		263	0.49	N/A			
Valid votes			53,677	97.80	+0.74	48,343	95.03	-0.31
Blank votes			1,002	1.83	-0.81	2,170	4.27	+0.22
Null votes			204	0.37	+0.07	358	0.70	+0.07
Turnout			54,883	67.69	+21.32	50,871	62.73	+15.69
Abstentions			26,195	32.31	-21.32	30,220	37.27	-15.69
Registered voters			81,078			81,091		
Source: Ministry of the Interior, Le Monde
Result						LÉ HOLD		

=== 2022 ===
Legislative Election 2022: Hauts-de-Seine's 4th constituency
Party	Candidate	Votes	%	±%
MoDem (Ensemble)	Isabelle Florennes	13,472	36.96	-6.56
EELV (NUPÉS)	Sabrina Sebaihi	13,122	36.00	+18.47
RN	Mélina Bravo	3,337	9.16	+2.90
DVG	Habiba Bigdade	2,055	5.64	N/A
REC	Florence Muller	1,925	5.28	N/A
Others	N/A	2,536		
Turnout		37,550	46.37	−1.07
2nd round result
EELV (NUPÉS)	Sabrina Sebaihi	18,520	51.00	N/A
MoDem (Ensemble)	Isabelle Florennes	17,795	49.00	−18.27
Turnout		36,315	47.04	+12.66
EELV gain from MoDem				

=== 2017 ===
Legislative Election 2017: Hauts-de-Seine's 4th constituency
Party	Candidate	Votes	%	±%
MoDem	Isabelle Florennes	15,727	43.52	+40.53
LR	Camille Bedin	5,106	14.13	−13.71
DVG	Zahra Boudjemai	4,938	13.66	N/A
LFI	Rossana Morain	3,399	9.41	N/A
FN	Laurent Salles	2,264	6.26	−2.54
PS	Habiba Bigdade	1,696	4.69	−17.66
EELV	Alexis Martin	1,241	3.43	+0.18
Others	N/A	1,769		
Turnout		36,140	47.44	−6.81
2nd round result
MoDem	Isabelle Florennes	17,616	67.27	N/A
LR	Camille Bedin	8,571	32.73	−8.13
Turnout		26,187	34.38	−16.77
MoDem gain from FG		Swing		

=== 2012 ===
Legislative Election 2012: Hauts-de-Seine's 4th constituency
Party	Candidate	Votes	%	±%
FG	Jacqueline Fraysse	11,491	29.90	+4.36
UMP	Christian Dupuy	10,698	27.84	−9.54
PS	Yacine Djaziri	8,588	22.35	+7.66
FN	Laurent Salles	3,380	8.80	+5.21
EELV	Laure Foullon	1,248	3.25	+0.51
MoDem	David Morgant	1,149	2.99	−7.92
Others	N/A	1,874		
Turnout		38,428	54.25	−4.63
2nd round result
FG	Jacqueline Fraysse	21,426	59.14	+4.70
UMP	Christian Dupuy	14,805	40.86	−4.70
Turnout		36,231	51.15	−4.98
FG gain from PCF				

=== 2007 ===
Legislative Election 2007: Hauts-de-Seine's 4th constituency
Party	Candidate	Votes	%	±%
UMP	Christian Dupuy	14,618	37.38	
PCF	Jacqueline Fraysse	9,989	25.54	
PS	Marie-Laure Meyer	5,743	14.69	
MoDem	Pierre Creuzet	4,265	10.91	
FN	Nathalie Bonnechere	1,403	3.59	
LV	Estelle Le Touze	1,072	2.74	
Others	N/A	2,017		
Turnout		39,627	58.88	
2nd round result
PCF	Jacqueline Fraysse	19,985	54.44	
UMP	Christian Dupuy	16,723	45.56	
Turnout		37,777	56.13	
PCF hold				

=== 2002 ===
Legislative Election 2002: Hauts-de-Seine's 4th constituency
Party	Candidate	Votes	%	±%
UMP	Christian Dupuy	11,602	30.75	
PCF	Jacqueline Fraysse	9,896	26.23	
PS	Jean-Pierre Respaut	5,775	15.30	
UDF	Pierre Creuzet	3,736	9.90	
FN	Leone Tholey	3,281	8.70	
LV	Estelle Le Touze	1,202	3.19	
Others	N/A	2,241		
Turnout		38,215	63.44	
2nd round result
PCF	Jacqueline Fraysse	17,729	50.76	
UMP	Christian Dupuy	17,197	49.24	
Turnout		35,966	59.71	
PCF hold				

=== 1997 ===
Legislative Election 1997: Hauts-de-Seine's 4th constituency
Party	Candidate	Votes	%	±%
RPR	Christian Dupuy	10,793	28.94	
PCF	Jacqueline Fraysse	9,661	25.90	
PS	Marie-Laure Meyer	6,248	16.75	
FN	Michel Schmidt	5,211	13.97	
LV	Christian Demercastel	1,441	3.86	
Others	N/A	3,940		
Turnout		38,502	64.69	
2nd round result
PCF	Jacqueline Fraysse	20,731	53.16	
RPR	Christian Dupuy	18,268	46.84	
Turnout		40,935	68.78	
PCF gain from RPR				

== Sources ==
- "Résultats électoraux officiels en France" (in French). 2017.
- Official results of French elections from 1998: "Résultats électoraux officiels en France" (in French). 1998. Archived from the original on 20 December 2011.
