= Jacqueline Fraysse =

French cardiologist and politician

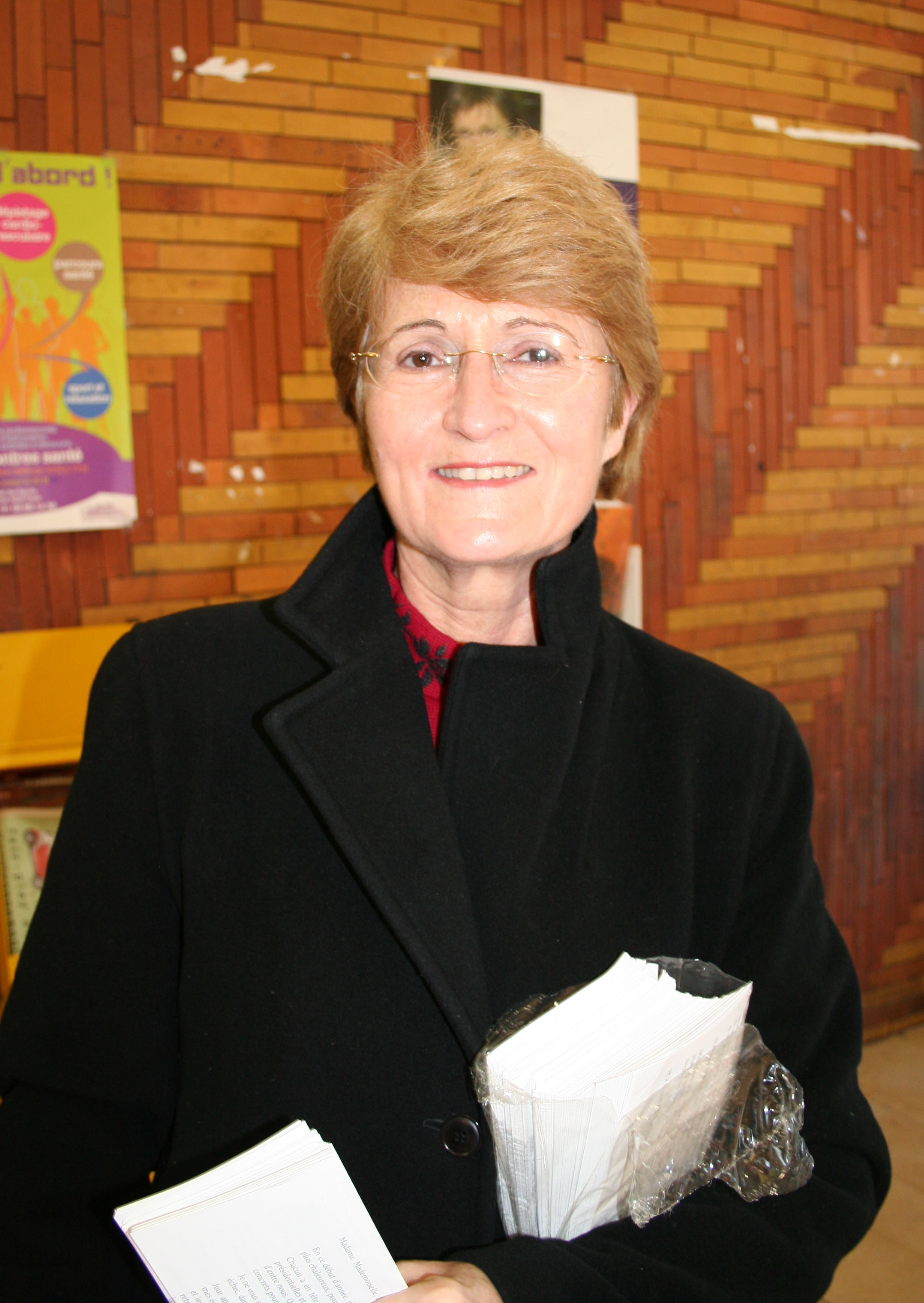
- Fraysse in 2007

Mayor of Nanterre
- In office 1988–2004
- Preceded by: Yves Saudmont
- Succeeded by: Patrick Jarry

Member of the National Assembly for Hauts-de-Seine's 4th constituency
- In office 1997–2017
- Preceded by: Christian Dupuy
- Succeeded by: Isabelle Florennes

Personal details
- Born: 25 February 1947 (age 79) Paris, France
- Party: PCF
- Profession: Physician

Jacqueline Fraysse-Cazalis (born 25 February 1947, in Paris) is a French cardiologist and politician. A member of the French Communist Party, she served in the National Assembly of France, from 1978 to 1986, as a Senator from 1986 to 1997, and in the National Assembly again from 1997 to 2017, as a member of the French Communist Party, in the Gauche démocrate et républicaine parliamentary group.

Fraysse has also served in various capacities for the town of Nanterre, whose mayor she was from 1988 until 2004.

In her capacity as mayor, Fraysse was overseeing a meeting of the Nanterre municipal council on 26 March 2002 when Richard Durn opened fire on the group, killing eight and wounding nineteen.
