= Sebaihi =

Sebaihi is a surname. Notable people with the surname include:

- Billal Sebaihi (born 1992), French footballer
- Sabrina Sebaihi (born 1981), French politician

== See also ==
- Sekai no Hito e
