= Hôtel de Ville, Nanterre =

Town hall in Nanterre, France

Hôtel de Ville
- The main frontage of the Hôtel de Ville in December 2011
- Interactive map of the Hôtel de Ville area

General information
- Type: City hall
- Architectural style: Moderne style
- Location: Nanterre, France
- Coordinates: 48.8920°N 2.2071°E
- Completed: 1973

Height
- Height: 15.5 metres (51 ft)

Design and construction
- Architects: Yves Bedon and Jean Darras

The Hôtel de Ville (French pronunciation: [otɛl də vil], City Hall) is a municipal building in Nanterre, Hauts-de-Seine, in the western suburbs of Paris, France, standing on Rue du 8 Mai 1945.

== History ==
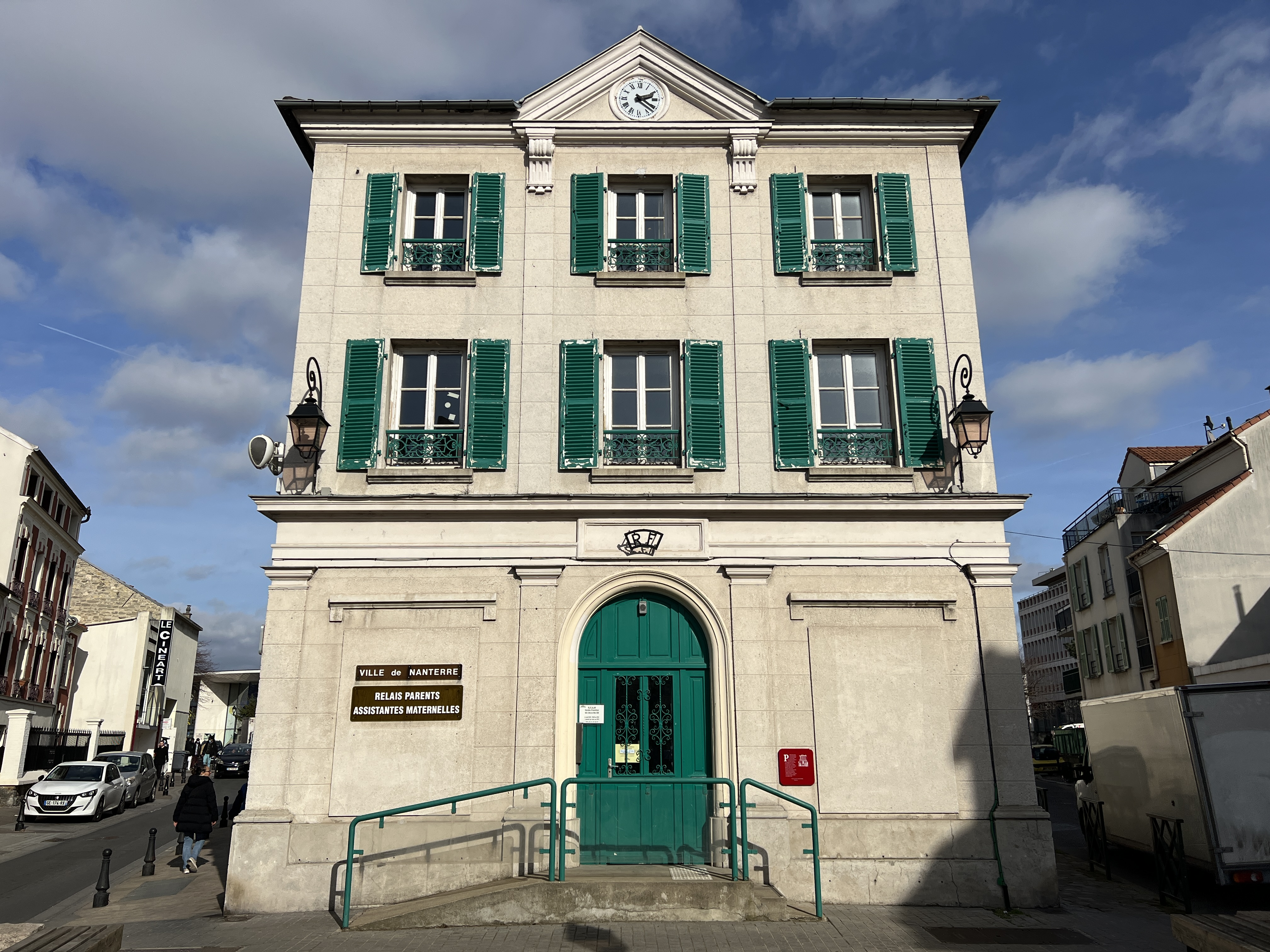
The town hall of 1842

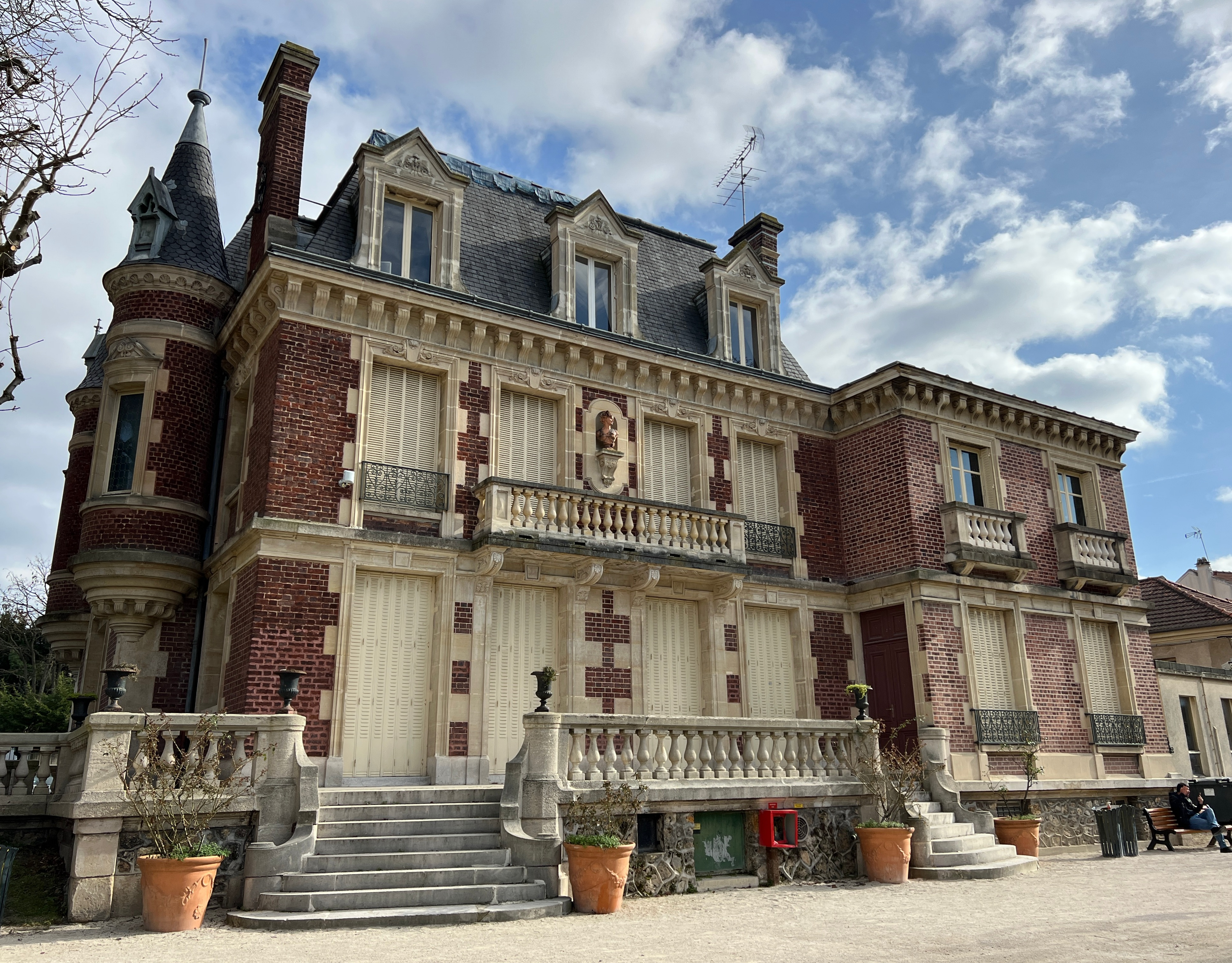
The Villa des Tourelles

Following the French Revolution, the new town council established its meeting place in one of the towers of the Port de Paris, one of the main gates of the old fortified town, located where Vieux Chemin de Paris (now Rue Sadi-Carnot) and Boulevard du Levant met. There was a prison cell on the ground floor and an office above.

In 1839, the town council decided to commission a dedicated town hall. The site they selected was a large disused cemetery on the corner of Rue du Cimetière (now Rue des Anciennes-Mairies) and Rue Saint-Denis (now Rue Waldeck-Rochet). The new building was designed by Paul-Eugène Lequeux in the neoclassical style, built in ashlar stone and was officially opened by the mayor, Charles-Maurice Delahaye, on 27 October 1842. The design involved a symmetrical main frontage of three bays facing the corner of the two streets. The central bay featured a round headed doorway with a moulded surround on the ground floor, casement windows with shutters on the first and second floors, and a pediment, with a clock in the tympanum, above. The other bays were fenestrated in a similar style.

In 1923, the council acquired Villa des Tourelles, a private house surrounded by a large park further north along Rue des Anciennes-Mairies. The intention was to create more substantial accommodation for staff, and the council relocated there the following year. The building had been designed by Charles Nizet and completed in 1885. It incorporated a stone which had been laid by Queen Anne of Austria at the college of the Abbey of Saint Genevieve on 7 March 1642. The villa was expanded with the construction of new wing to accommodate the Salle des Mariages (wedding room) in 1931.

Following the Paris insurrection on 19 August 1944, during the Second World War, the former mayor, Raymond Barbet, stood on the balcony and claimed possession of the town hall. German troops briefly regained control but the town was liberated on 25 August 1944.

By 1958, it was apparent that a modern building was required. The site the town council selected was on the northwest side of Avenue Frederic et Irene Joliot Curie. The new building was designed by Yves Bedon and Jean Darras in the Moderne style, built in reinforced concrete and glass and was officially opened by the mayor, Yves Saudmont, on 20 October 1973. The design involved a four-storey truncated pyramid, the base of which measured 69 meters (226 ft) by 57 metres (187 ft), and it was 15.5 metres (51 ft) high. Internally, the principal room was a large assembly hall with capacity to seat 1,200 people.

On 27 March 2002, a member of the public, Richard Durn, caused a massacre when he shot eight councillors dead and injured nineteen others in the town hall. He committed suicide the following day.
