= Isabelle Florennes =

French politician (born 1967)

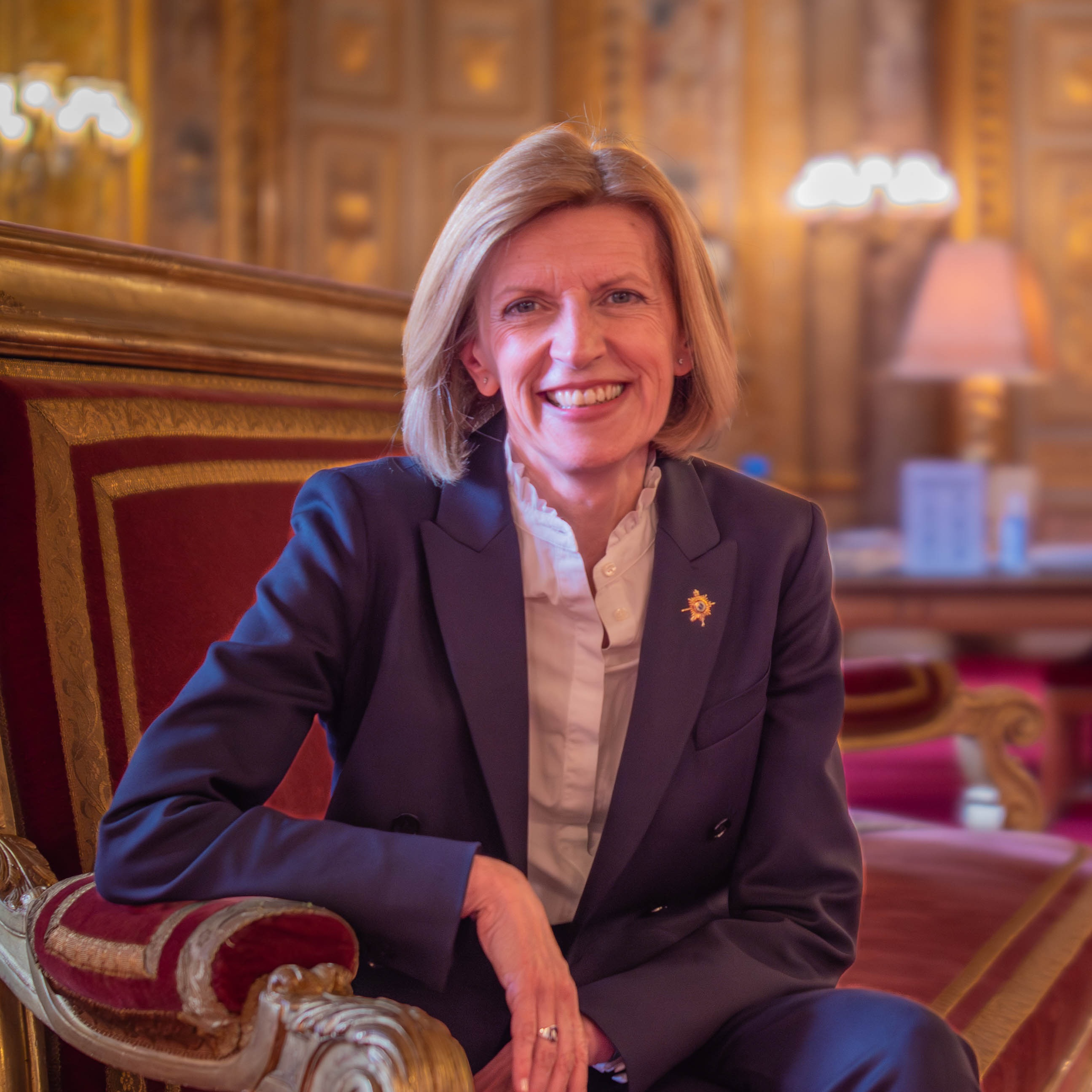

Senator for Hauts-de-Seine
- Incumbent
- Assumed office 2 October 2023

Member of the National Assembly for Hauts-de-Seine's 4th constituency
- In office 21 June 2017 – 21 June 2022
- Preceded by: Jacqueline Fraysse
- Succeeded by: Sabrina Sebaihi

Personal details
- Born: 2 August 1967 (age 59) Arras, France
- Party: MoDem
- Parent: Jean-Marie Vanlerenberghe (father)
- Education: Panthéon-Assas University
- Website: isabelle-florennes.avecvous.fr

Isabelle Florennes (French pronunciation: [izabɛl flɔʁɛn]; née Vanlerenberghe; born 2 August 1967) is a French politician who has served as a Senator for Hauts-de-Seine since 2023. A member of the Democratic Movement (MoDem), she previously represented Hauts-de-Seine's 4th constituency in the National Assembly from 2017 to 2022.

== Career ==
Florennes worked as a parliamentary staffer for her father Senator Jean-Marie Vanlerenberghe from 2004 to 2017. A member of the Democratic Movement, she was first elected to the municipal council of Suresnes in 2008. She served as a Deputy Mayor of Suresnes from 2008 to 2017 under Mayor Christian Dupuy.

In the 2017 legislative election, she won Hauts-de-Seine's 4th constituency with the support of En Marche with 67.2% of the second-round vote after incumbent Jacqueline Fraysse declined to run for re-election to a fifth term.

In the National Assembly, Florennes was a member of the Committee on Legal Affairs and was part of the French-Belgian Parliamentary Friendship Group and the French-Senegalese Parliamentary Friendship Group. From 2020, she was a co-chair of the Inter-Parliamentary Alliance on China.

In 2022, Florennes lost re-election with 49% of the second-round vote against Sabrina Sebaihi of Europe Ecology – The Greens.

In 2023 Senate election, she was second on the Union of Democrats and Independents-dominated list led by Hervé Marseille and thus elected to the Senate. She sits with the Centrist Union group.

== Personal life ==
She is the daughter of Jean-Marie Vanlerenberghe, who served as a Senator for Pas-de-Calais from 2001 to 2025. She sat with her father in the Senate in 2023–2025, making them the first father and daughter to sit together in the Senate in French history.

== See also ==
- List of MPs who lost their seat in the 2022 French legislative election
