= Nanterre massacre =

2002 mass shooting in Nanterre, France

- The Hôtel de Ville, Nanterre, where the shooting took place
- Location: 48.8923°N 2.2057°E; Hôtel de Ville, Nanterre, France
- Date: March 27, 2002; 24 years ago 1:15 a.m. (CEST)
- Target: Nanterre town councilors, particularly mayor Jacqueline Fraysse
- Attack type: Mass shooting
- Weapons: 9mm Glock 17 semi-automatic pistol; 9mm Glock 19 semi-automatic pistol; Smith & Wesson revolver (.357 Magnum)
- Deaths: 8
- Injuries: 19
- Perpetrator: Richard Durn
- Motive: Hatred towards politicians

The Nanterre massacre was a mass shooting that occurred on 27 March 2002, at the Hôtel de Ville in Nanterre, France. Gunman Richard Durn opened fire at the end of a town council meeting, resulting in the deaths of eight councillors and the injury of nineteen others. Durn committed suicide the following day, by leaping from a police station window during questioning.

== Shooting ==
At approximately 1:11 a.m. (CEST), following a meeting of the municipal council chaired by Mayor Jacqueline Fraysse at the Hôtel de Ville, Richard Durn rose from his seat, removed firearms previously hidden under his jacket, and opened fire. Durn killed eight councilors and injured 19 others; 14 critically, before being overpowered by Gerard Perreau-Bezouille and other councilors. Once overpowered, Durn began shouting, "Kill me!"

He fired 38 rounds, aiming at the heart or head of the victims. The shooting lasted 55 seconds. The guns used were two 9mm Glock pistols and a .357 Magnum Smith & Wesson revolver.

== Perpetrator ==
Richard Durn

The perpetrator in the shootings was Richard Durn, 33, who lived in Nanterre. He was on welfare and lived with his mother. His mother, from Slovenia, had fled in 1958 with her husband to escape the Soviet political regime. Durn was an unintended pregnancy, born out of wedlock to an unknown father, and shortly after his birth his mother divorced her husband. Durn never knew his father, instead creating a fantasy where he was born to an executed Slovenian political dissident. He was raised mostly by his half-sister with his mother working. He became depressed as a teenager, skipping classes and refusing to speak.

He had seen a psychiatrist since the age of 15, but was inconsistent in his treatment. At age 20, he attempted suicide, overdosing on his psychiatric medications. He survived, but attempted suicide again two years later. On 10 July 1998, he was received by a psychiatrist at the university psychological support office, whom Durn proceeded to threaten with a gun. This was reported, but no action was taken. Durn was a member of a shooting club since 1997. He was a loner, with little to no romantic or sexual relations; he had experienced one romantic relationship in his life, and considered its end to be his "greatest failure".

He was politically active, attending almost all of the municipal council meetings, and according to those that knew him would only talk about politics. Durn was left-wing. He was especially interested in human rights; he joined the Human Rights League of France in 2001, its treasurer, and did human rights missions in Bosnia and Kosovo. He had been expressing hate towards politicians for several months; he expressed to his mother and best friend that he could kill all the politicians in Nanterre, accusing them of being corrupt. He was angered at the Greens for not being socially involved enough. In July 2001, he went to an anti-globalization summit in Genoa. This summit was especially violent and one demonstrator was killed, and afterwards Durn expressed that "the only solution was violence". Another human rights mission to Kosovo in November 2001 went poorly, with Durn crashing the vehicle and destroying it; this resulted in a mental breakdown, and Durn proceeded to cut contact with everyone he knew.

Several months before the shooting, Durn read a book titled Je vous hais (transl. I hate you [all]), which opens with the words "I am your waste. I will destroy you." This book contains a character, "Jean", the hero of the book, who lives in Paris with his parents, and hates being alive viewing himself as a "waste". Durn strongly identified with the protagonist. He gave this book to his best friend, telling him to read it. In January, he asked this friend to get him cocaine and an Uzi submachine gun, which his friend refused to do. The Sunday before the shooting, he called this friend seven times in a hostile manner, telling him that something would happen and it would be his fault, which his friend thought would be his suicide. The day before the shooting, he took a pack of Prozac, and went to the gun club to train. He wrote three letters, one to his mother and two to two people he had met during his humanitarian visits to Bosnia. In the letter to his mother, he stated that: "I should have died a long time ago. I don't know how to do anything in life, not even how to die without doing any harm. Cowardice is over now. I have to die at least feeling free and getting my kicks. That's why I have to kill people. Once in my life, I'll have an orgasm." In the letters he stated he wished to kill people and himself to "give himself the illusion of having been important"; he did not mention elected officials or any of the victims.

== Aftermath ==
Victims

- Olivier Mazzotti, 38
- Valéri Meot, 40
- Michel Raouly, 58
- Jacotte Duplenne, 48
- Christian Bouthier, 46
- Louiza Benakli, 40
- Pascal Sternberg, 30
- Monique Leroy-Sauter, 43

—

An official tribute was paid to the victims on 2 April, in the presence of President Jacques Chirac, Prime Minister Lionel Jospin and Interior Minister Daniel Vaillant.

Durn was interrogated at the police station at 36 Quai des Orfèvres, Paris. He said that he had fired without targeting person or political party, except for the mayor Jacqueline Fraysse, who he had targeted on purpose, "for her quality as mayor and as the embodiment of an irremovable apparatchik, creating a system of clientelism and typical representative of the hypocritical red bourgeoisie." He also said that he wanted to die "because I am a thing, a piece of trash". He admitted he had planned the act for several weeks. On 28 March, the next day, he committed suicide by jumping through a window, falling four floors to his death.

The event which takes place in the middle of the campaign of the presidential election of 2002. Beyond the unanimous tributes of the political class, a statement by Jacques Chirac on insecurity appears to his opponents as an attempt at political recovery condemned by the PS. The campaign resumes its course but is again marked by the theme of insecurity by the Paul Voise case. Ten years later, the media draw the parallel with the Toulouse and Montauban shootings.

Also, many right-wing polemical voices rose to demand the dissolution of the political party to which Richard Durn belonged, which will have no effect. Three days before the first round of the presidential election, Prime Minister Lionel Jospin proposed 9 measures to tighten up the arms legislation. Following the example of Tony Blair in 1998, one of the measures planned was to confiscate without compensation all handguns with central percussion legally held by sport shooters. Reactions were numerous, notably via the Internet, and contributed to the failure of candidate Jospin in the first round. The sports shooters noted the State's shortcomings and its inability to operate its administrative monitoring system for weapons subject to authorization or declaration. The Prime Minister nevertheless tried to pass his text urgently between the two rounds. This will be rejected by the Constitutional Council on a technical point, a "consultation" meeting had not had time to be organized. With also the attempted attack by Maxime Brunerie against President Jacques Chirac on 14 July 2002, the State nevertheless tightened its legislation on the practice of sport shooting with the law for internal security (LSI) of 18 March 2003. A medical certificate is now required to apply for possession of a firearm. The psychiatric history is checked with the Departmental Directorate of Health and Social Affairs (DDASS). The prefectural services have been instructed to react when the expiry date of the authorizations has passed. The .22 LR caliber rifles classified in 7th category cease to be sold over the counter. Their acquisition is limited to holders of a hunting license or a shooting license.

== Legacy ==
The massacre was discussed by French philosopher Bernard Stiegler in his book, Acting Out. Stiegler argues that Durn's feeling of non-existence was symptomatic of a society which tends to destroy the love of oneself and others, and that Durn's actions represent a "hyper-diachronic" acting out which is made possible by this feeling of non-existence.

== See also ==
- List of massacres in France
- List of mass shootings in France
- Zug massacre
