= Nanterre =

Prefecture of Hauts-de-Seine, Paris, France

- Prefecture and commune
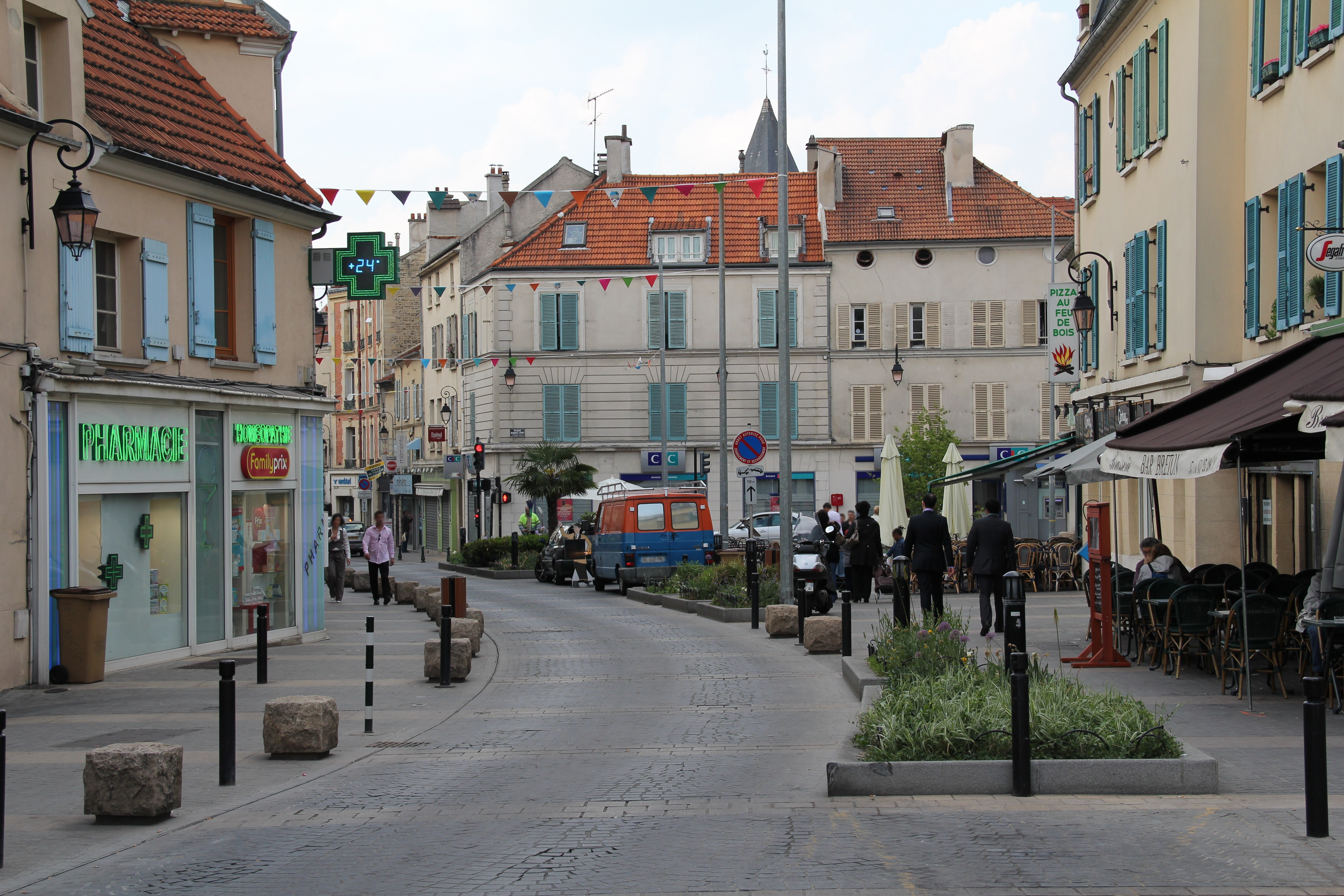
- Place Gabriel Péri

- Coat of arms

- Location (in red) within Paris inner suburbs
- Location of Nanterre
- Location within France Location within Île-de-France (region)
- Coordinates: 48°53′56″N 2°11′49″E
- Country: France
- Region: Île-de-France
- Department: Hauts-de-Seine
- Arrondissement: Nanterre
- Canton: Nanterre-1 and 2
- Intercommunality: Grand Paris

Government
  - Mayor (2026–32): Raphaël Adam (Ind.)
- Area^{1}: 12.19 km^{2} (4.71 sq mi)
- Elevation: 30 m (98 ft)
- Highest elevation: 127 m (417 ft)
- Lowest elevation: 22 m (72 ft)
- Population (2023): 97,783
  - Density: 8,022/km^{2} (20,780/sq mi)
- Demonym: Nanterriens
- Time zone: UTC+01:00 (CET)
  - Summer (DST): UTC+02:00 (CEST)
- INSEE/Postal code: 92050 /92000
- ^{1} French Land Register data, which excludes lakes, ponds, glaciers > 1 km^{2} (0.386 sq mi or 247 acres) and river estuaries.

Nanterre (/nɒ̃ˈtɛər/; French: [nɑ̃tɛʁ]) is the prefecture of the Hauts-de-Seine department in the western suburbs of Paris, France. It is located some 11 km (6.8 mi) northwest of the centre of Paris. As of 2023, the population of the commune was 97,783.

The eastern part of Nanterre, bordering the communes of Courbevoie and Puteaux, contains a small part of the La Défense business district of Paris and some of the tallest buildings in the Paris region. Because the headquarters of many major corporations are located in La Défense, the court of Nanterre is well known in the media for the number of high-profile lawsuits and trials that take place in it. The city of Nanterre also includes the Paris West University Nanterre La Défense, one of the largest universities in the Paris region.

Inhabitants are called Nanterrien(ne)s or Nanterrois(es).

== History ==
Archeological discoveries made between 1994 and 2005 found a Gallic necropolis which has been dated to the third century BC, and also call into debate both the exact location of the pre-Roman capital of the Parisii and the initial site of Lutetia, the Roman era Paris. The large necropolis, as well as working people's homes from some time later in the ancient era, is near the bank of the Seine, in the northwest of Nanterre, and might be the sacred place that is referred to etymologically. The archeological work in Nanterre has suggested over 15 hectares (37 acres) of pre-Roman or Roman-era construction. These archeological findings may be an indication that Nanterre was the closest pre-Roman settlement to the modern centre of Paris.

Lutetia is mentioned by Julius Caesar in 50 BCE, reporting an assembly in Lutetia in 53 BC between himself, commander of the Roman Legions, and local Gallic leaders. Although this had been thought to possibly be Île de la Cité, largely since Caesar mentions an island, the river at Nanterre follows two channels around an island. In 52 BC, the Parisii took up arms with the Gallic war leader Vercingetorix, and were defeated by Titus Labienus, one of Caesar's legates. Caesar mentions in his Commentarii that the Parisii destroyed the bridges and set fire to Lutetia before the arrival of the Roman forces.

Saint Genevieve, patron saint of Paris, was born in Nanterre c. 419–422.

During the repression of January and February 1894, the police conducted raids targeting the anarchists living there, without much success.

The Hôtel de Ville

The Hôtel de Ville (town hall), designed in the shape of a truncated pyramid, was completed in 1973.

On 27 March 2002, Richard Durn, a disgruntled local activist, shot and killed eight town councilors and 19 others were wounded at the town hall in what the French press dubbed the Nanterre massacre. On 28 March, the murderer killed himself by jumping from the 4th floor of 36 Quai des Orfèvres, in Paris, while he was questioned by two policemen about the reason for his killings.

In June 2023, seventeen year old Nahel Merzouk was killed by a police officer following a traffic stop. His death sparked violent unrest around France.

== Administration ==
Nanterre is divided into two cantons:

- Canton of Nanterre-1
- Canton of Nanterre-2

== Transport ==
Nanterre is served by three stations on RER A: Nanterre-Préfecture, Nanterre-Université, and Nanterre-Ville.

Nanterre-Université station is also an interchange station on the Transilien Paris-Saint-Lazare suburban rail line.

== Economy ==
Société Générale has its headquarters in the Tours Société Générale in La Défense and Nanterre. The company moved into the building in 1995.

Groupe du Louvre and subsidiary Louvre Hôtels have their head office in Village 5 in La Défense and Nanterre.

== Sports ==
The basketball club Nanterre 92 plays at Palais des Sports Maurice Thorez.

The rugby union club Racing 92 opened the new Plenitude Arena in October 2017 and played their first game in the new facility in December 2017. It has a capacity of 32,000 for rugby and 40,000 for concerts. The venue opened as U Arena, but received its first sponsored name "Paris La Défense Arena" in June 2018 through a sponsorship deal with Paris La Défense, the company that manages the La Défense business district. Its second sponsored name came after Eni Plenitude bought the naming rights in 2026.

It also hosted WWE Clash in Paris in August 2025.

== Demographics ==
=== Population ===
Historical population

Year	Pop.	±% p.a.
1793	1,991	—
1800	2,222	+1.58%
1806	2,340	+0.87%
1821	1,903	−1.37%
1831	2,500	+2.77%
1836	2,590	+0.71%
1841	2,792	+1.51%
1846	2,842	+0.36%
1851	2,770	−0.51%
1856	2,919	+1.05%
1861	3,549	+3.99%
1866	3,907	+1.94%
1872	3,944	+0.16%
1876	4,279	+2.06%
1881	4,984	+3.10%
1886	5,592	+2.33%
1891	10,430	+13.28%
1896	11,950	+2.76%
1901	14,140	+3.42%

Year	Pop.	±% p.a.
1906	17,434	+4.28%
1911	21,349	+4.13%
1921	27,042	+2.39%
1926	35,843	+5.80%
1931	42,978	+3.70%
1936	46,065	+1.40%
1946	41,860	−0.95%
1954	53,037	+3.00%
1962	83,416	+5.82%
1968	90,332	+1.34%
1975	95,032	+0.73%
1982	88,578	−1.00%
1990	84,565	−0.58%
1999	84,281	−0.04%
2007	88,875	+0.67%
2012	90,722	+0.41%
2017	95,105	+0.95%
2023	97,783	+0.46%

Source: EHESS and INSEE (1968-2023)

=== Immigration ===
Place of birth of residents of Nanterre in 1999
Born in metropolitan France	Born outside metropolitan France			
75.7%	24.3%			
75.7%	Born in overseas France	Born in foreign countries with French citizenship at birth^{1}	EU-15 immigrants^{2}	Non-EU-15 immigrants
75.7%	2.7%	2.8%	3.9%	14.9%
^{1} This group is made up largely of former French settlers, such as pieds-noirs in Northwest Africa, followed by former colonial citizens who had French citizenship at birth (such as was often the case for the native elite in French colonies), as well as to a lesser extent foreign-born children of French expatriates. A foreign country is understood as a country not part of France in 1999, so a person born for example in 1950 in Algeria, when Algeria was an integral part of France, is nonetheless listed as a person born in a foreign country in French statistics.^{2} An immigrant is a person born in a foreign country not having French citizenship at birth. An immigrant may have acquired French citizenship since moving to France, but is still considered an immigrant in French statistics. On the other hand, persons born in France with foreign citizenship (the children of immigrants) are not listed as immigrants.

== Education ==
Senior high schools include:

- Lycée Joliot-Curie de Nanterre
- Lycée polyvalent Louise-Michel
- Lycée professionnel Paul-Langevin
- Lycée professionnel Claude-Chappe

== International relations ==
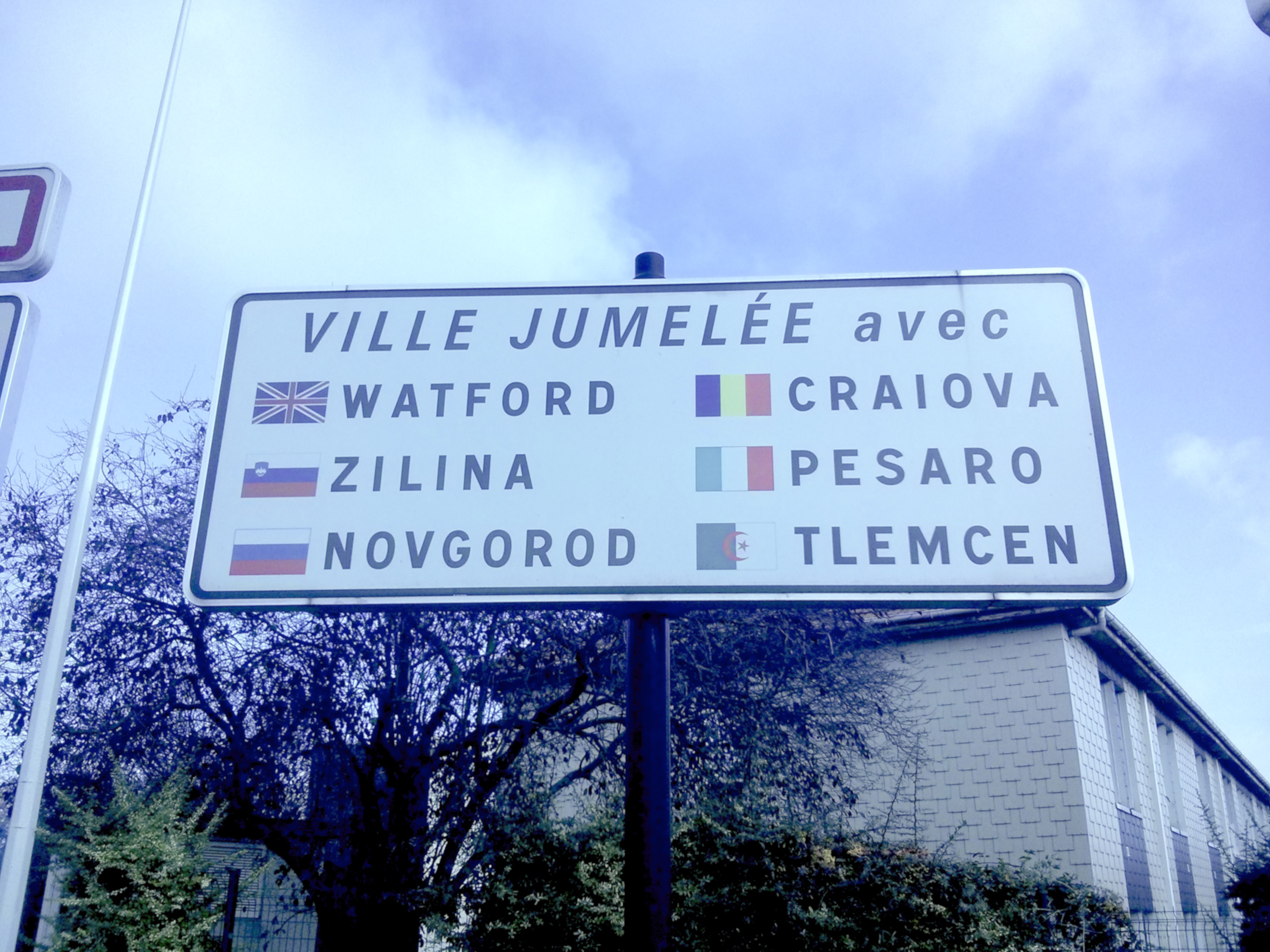
Nanterre's twin towns sign

Nanterre is twinned with:

- Craiova, Romania
- Pesaro, Italy
- Tlemcen, Algeria
- Veliky Novgorod, Russia
- Watford, United Kingdom
- Žilina, Slovakia

== See also ==
- La Défense business district.
- List of tallest structures in Paris
- Communes of the Hauts-de-Seine department
