= Sabrina Sebaihi =

French politician

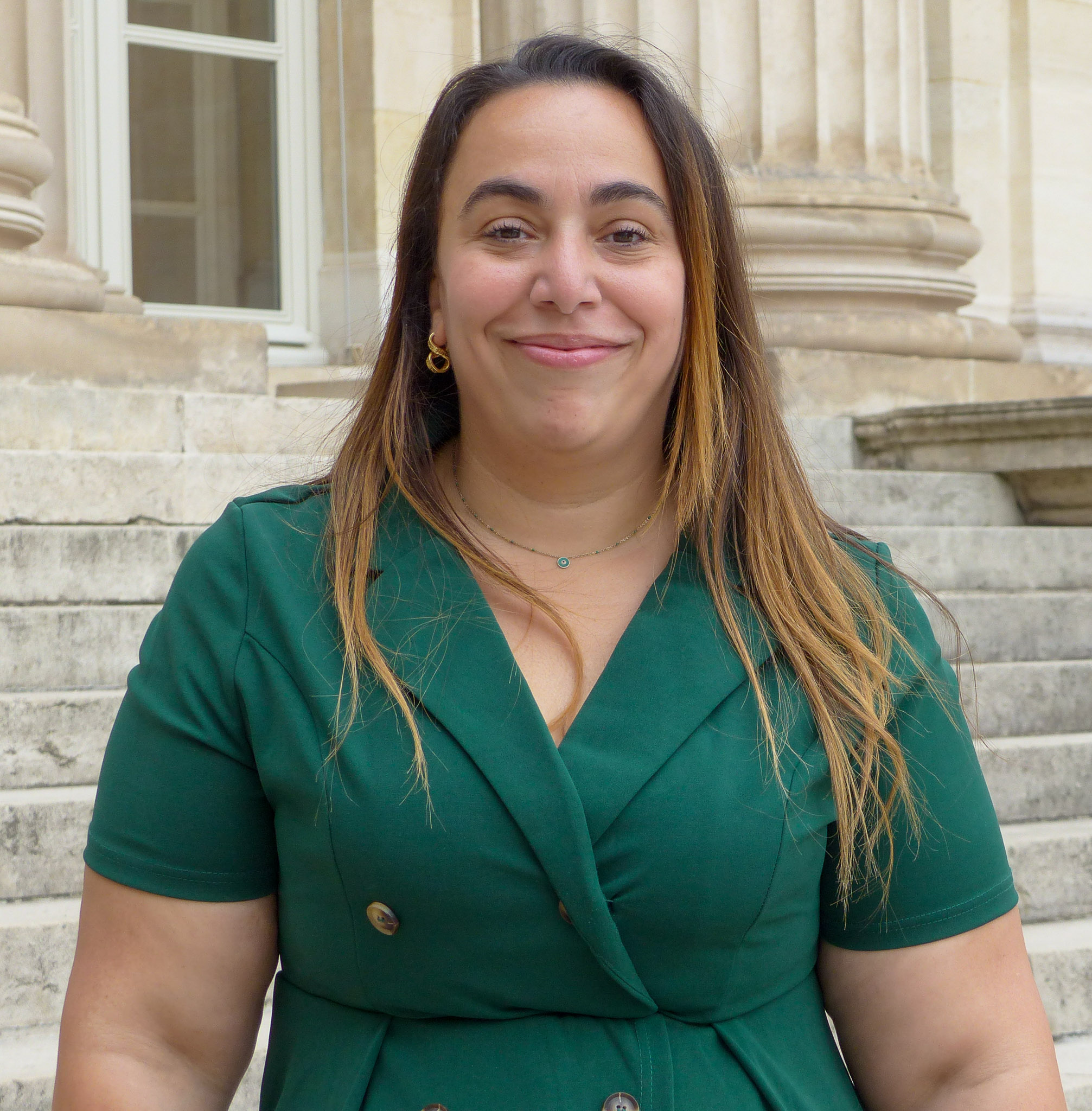

Deputy of the National Assembly for Hauts-de-Seine's 4th constituency
- Incumbent
- Assumed office 20 June 2022
- Preceded by: Isabelle Florennes

Personal details
- Born: 10 May 1981 (age 45) Ivry-sur-Seine, Val-de-Marne, France
- Party: The Ecologists

Sabrina Sebaihi (born 10 May 1981) is a French politician from The Ecologists. She became the Member of Parliament for Hauts-de-Seine's 4th constituency in the 2022 French legislative election. As well as the President of the Friendship Group France-South Korea

== See also ==
- List of deputies of the 16th National Assembly of France
