= List of Old Gowers =

This is a List of notable Old Gowers, former pupils of University College School. The school opened on 1 November 1830, at 16 Gower Street, which is the origin of the sobriquet "Old Gower".

== A ==
- Zak Abel (born 1995), English singer/songwriter, musician
- Thomas Adès (OG ?-1988), composer
- Rev. Dr. Hermann Adler (OG 1852–54), Chief Rabbi of the United Kingdom
- Rev. Canon Alfred Ainger (OG 1847–49), Master of the Temple
- David Ainsworth, Liberal Member of Parliament for Cumberland 1880–1885 and 1892–1895
- Sir John Stirling Ainsworth, 1st Baronet, Liberal Member for Argyllshire 1903–1918
- Moses Angel, according to A Tradition for Freedom founder of The Jewish Chronicle
- Richard Arnell (OG 1927–35), composer
- Sir Eric Ash (OG ?-?), electrical engineer and Rector of Imperial College (1985–93)
- Professor William Edward Ayrton (OG 1859–64), physicist

== B ==
- Rev. Edward Gilpin Bagshawe (OG 1836–38), Roman Catholic Bishop of Nottingham and later of the titular see of Selucia.
- Walter William Rouse Ball (OG ?-?), mathematician and historian, Fellow of Trinity College, Cambridge His bequests founded the Rouse Ball Professor of Mathematics and Rouse Ball Professor of English Law in the University of Cambridge. The Rouse Ball Professor of Mathematics at the University of Oxford is named after him as well.
- Sir Roger Bannister (OG 1944–46), runner and neurologist
- John Barrett, tennis player and commentator, who represented Britain in the Davis Cup
- Lucas Barrett (OG ?-?), English geologist and naturalist
- Sir G. C. T. Bartley (OG 1852–59), politician
- Tony Bastable (OG 1955–?), television presenter and independent producer
- Walter Bayes, painter and art critic
- Doyne Bell (1830―1888) antiquary
- Robert Anning Bell (OG 1876–78), painter and illustrator
- Nicolas Bentley, illustrator
- Alan Blaikley (OG 1948–58), songwriter
- Dirk Bogarde (OG ?-? Junior Branch only), actor
- Sir Chris Bonington (OG 1944–52), mountaineer
- Dion Boucicault (OG ?-?), Anglo-Irish author and playwright. Helped to get the first dramatic US copyright law passed in 1856, and was involved in the setting up of the UK royalty system.
- Sir Alfred Gibbs Bourne (OG 1872–76), director of the Indian Institute of Science
- Edgar Alfred Bowring, literary translator, Liberal Member of Parliament for Exeter 1868–1874
- William Hardwick Bradbury (OG 1843-1848) – printer and publisher
- Sir Edward Braddon (OG 1843–44), Premier of Tasmania
- Major General Sir John Rose Bradford, 1st Baronet (OG 1875–80), president of the Royal College of Physicians
- Professor Paul Brand (OG ?-?) orthopaedic surgeon who helped sufferers from leprosy. Emeritus Clinical Professor of Orthopaedics, University of Washington, international president of the Leprosy Mission, Hunterian Professor of the Royal College of Surgeons.
- Leslie Bricusse English composer, lyricist, and playwright, most prominently working in musicals and also film theme songs.
- Simon Brodkin, Comedian
- William Speirs Bruce (OG 1885–1887?), Polar scientist and oceanographer
- Sir George Buchanan (OG 1878–85), chief medical officer for England, 1879–1892
- Laurence Buckman (OG ?-1972), chairman of the British Medical Association's General Practitioners’ Committee.
- Edward Levy-Lawson, 1st Baron Burnham (OG 1847–50), principal proprietor of The Daily Telegraph
- Sir Edward Henry Busk, vice-chancellor of London University 1905–1907
- Ingram Bywater (OG 1853–56), Regius Professor of Greek at Oxford University

== C ==
- Gerald Campion, actor, most famous for playing Billy Bunter
- G. S. Carr (OG ?-?), mathematician.
- Richard D'Oyly Carte, impresario who owned and built the Savoy Hotel and Savoy Theatre
- Bertie Carvel, (OG ?-?), actor and singer
- Joseph Chamberlain (OG 1850–52), Colonial Secretary, leader of the Imperialist Liberals and father of Prime Minister Neville Chamberlain
- Richard Chamberlain, Member of Parliament for Islington 1885–1892
- Sir Arthur Charles (OG 1848–54), Judge of the High Court
- André Chevrillon (OG 1876–77), member of the French Academy
- Sir William Christie, Astronomer Royal 1881–1910
- Sir William Job Collins (OG 1869–76), Member of Parliament, Chairman of London County Council, Surgeon, two term Vice-Chancellor of the University of London (1907-9, 1911–12)
- Sir Daniel Cooper (OG 1835–39), first Speaker of the Legislative Assembly of New South Wales
- Allan Corduner (OG ?-?), actor, played Sir Arthur Sullivan in the film Topsy-Turvy.
- Gordon Corera, broadcast journalist
- Baron Cozens-Hardy (OG ?-?), Commander of the Royal Naval Volunteer Reserve in the First World War
- Joe Craig, novelist
- Sir Frank Crisp (OG 1857–59), lawyer
- Charles Crompton, Liberal Member of Parliament for Staffordshire 1885–1886
- Sir David Crouch (OG ?-?), Conservative politician
- Eric Crozier, opera producer

== D ==
- Paul Dacre, editor of the Daily Mail
- William Frend De Morgan (OG 1849–55), artist, potter and novelist
- Hugh Dennis (OG 1974–1980), actor and comedian
- Nick Denton (OG ?-?), internet businessman
- Jonathan Djanogly, Member of Parliament
- John Dorian (OG ?-?), surgeon
- Sir Henry Doulton (OG 1833–36), inventor and manufacturer of pottery, winner of the Albert Medal
- Sir Edwin Durning-Lawrence (OG 1847–52), Professor at University College London who researched the Baconian theory
- Joseph Duveen, 1st Baron Duveen of Millbank (OG 1877–80), art dealer and philanthropist

== E ==
- Richard Eckersley, deconstructionist graphic designer
- Albert James Edmondson, 1st Baron Sandford (OG ?-?), Conservative politician

== F ==
- Sir George Faudel-Phillips (OG 1853–55), Lord Mayor of London 1896–97
- Luke Brandon Field (OG 1995-2006), actor
- Horace Field (OG 1876-8), Architect
- Anthony Finkelstein (OG 1970-1977), Dean of the UCL Faculty of Engineering Sciences
- Lord Daniel Finkelstein (OG 1973-1980), chief leader writer at The Times
- Sir John Ambrose Fleming (OG ?-?), electrical engineer
- Sir Walter Morley Fletcher (OG 1886–91), physiologist, Secretary of the Medical Research Council, Senior Tutor of Trinity College, Cambridge
- Matt Floyd broadcaster for Sky Sports
- Ford Madox Ford (OG 1888–90), novelist, editor
- George Forrest (OG ?-?), Wykeham Professor of Logic, University of Oxford, founder member of British Committee for the Reunification of the Parthenon Marbles
- Sir Michael Foster (OG 1849–52), physiologist, professor and Member of Parliament
- Sir Gregory Foster (OG 1881-4), Vice-Chancellor of the University of London, the first Provost of University College London.
- Thomas Fox, cricketer and dermatologist
- Percy F. Frankland, chemist
- Jonathan Freedland (OG ?-?), newspaper journalist, The Guardian

== G ==
- Clive Gardiner, designer, artist and illustrator
- Simon Garfield (OG ?-?), journalist, The Observer, and author
- Alex Garland (OG ?- 1987), novelist, writer of The Beach
- Samuel Gee, physician and paediatrician
- Charles Gifford (OG ?-?), Canadian politician
- Paul Gilroy (OG ?-?), author and Giddens Professor, the London School of Economics
- David Ginsburg (OG ?-?), Member of Parliament
- Oliver Gledhill (OG ?-?), cellist
- Paul Gorman (OG 1971–1978), writer
- Sir John Grandy (OG ?-?), Marshal of the Royal Air Force, Chief of the Air Staff, 1967 to 1971. Governor of Gibraltar, 1973 to 1978.
- Sir Alan Greengross (OG ?-?), Former Conservative Leader on the Greater London Council, Vice-Chair of the Council of University College London
- Joseph Gouge Greenwood (OG 1835–37), Principal of Owens College and Vice-Chancellor of Victoria University
- Maurice Greiffenhagen (OG 1872–76), artist
- Raymond Gubbay (OG 1957-62), impresario.
- William Court Gully, 1st Viscount Selby (OG 1848–49), Speaker of the House of Commons
- Thom Gunn (OG ?-?), poet
- Robert Gunther (OG ?-?), founded the Museum of the History of Science.

== H ==
- Sir Francis Seymour Haden (OG ?-?), English etcher, writer and surgeon
- Roger Leighton Hall (OG 1952–55), New Zealand playwright.
- Professor W.D. Halliburton (OG1872-77), Professor of Physiology, King's College London
- Laurence Halsted (OG 1984– ), fencer
- Nick Harkaway, novelist and commentator
- Numa Edward Hartog (OG 1857–61), First Jewish Senior Wrangler, prominent figure in the movement to remove Jewish disabilities, helped to secure the passing of the Universities Tests Act in 1871
- Sir Philip John Hartog (OG 1874–80), Vice-Chancellor of the University of Dacca
- Mark Hatton (OG 1984-91) 2 x Olympic Luge Racer
- Count Hayashi Tadasu, Japanese Foreign Minister and Ambassador to the Court of St James
- Alexander Hill (OG 1870–72), Master of Downing College, Cambridge, Vice-Chancellor of the University of Cambridge (1897–99), Principal of Southampton University College 1912-1920
- Mayer Hillman (OG ?-?), author and Senior Fellow Emeritus of the Policy Studies Institute
- David Hobman, Founder Director of Age Concern.
- S. D. Holden (OG ?–c. 1886), steam locomotive engineer
- Frank Holl (OG ?-?), English painter
- Tom Hood (OG ?-?), humourist
- Ken Howard (OG 1947-1956), songwriter, composer, film director and author.
- Geoffrey Howard, English cricketer and cricket administrator.
- Dr Tristram Hunt (OG ?-1992), historian and Labour Member of Parliament
- Richard Holt Hutton (OG 1835–41), editor of The Spectator
- Leonard Huxley LL.D. (OG 1872–77), editor of The Cornhill Magazine

== I ==
- Rufus Isaacs, 1st Marquess of Reading (OG 1873–74), Lord Chief Justice, Foreign Secretary (briefly), Leader of the House of Lords, solicitor and attorney general (held separately), Ambassador to the USA, Lord Warden of the Cinque Ports and Viceroy of India.
- Keith Usherwood Ingold, British chemist.

== J ==
- William Stanley Jevons (OG ?-?), logician and economist
- Sir David Brynmor Jones, MP (OG 1862–69), writer of parliamentary reports.
- Judge Jules (OG ?-?), dance music DJ

== K ==
- Ian Katz (OG ?-?), Editor of Newsnight
- Paul Kaye (OG 1978-81), Actor, comedian, best known for the renegade character 'Dennis Pennis'
- Alex Kay-Jelski (OG ?-?), journalist, editor of The Athletic
- Brian Keith, Court of Appeal judge, Hong Kong; High Court judge, England and Wales
- Arthur Edwin Kennelly (OG ?-?), American electrical engineer
- Joseph Wilfred Kerman (OG 1937-39), American musicologist
- Dairoku Kikuchi (OG ?-?), Japanese mathematician and Minister of Education

== L ==
- Martin Lamble (OG ?-?), drummer with Fairport Convention
- Edmund Leighton (OG ?-?), artist
- Frederic Leighton, 1st Baron Leighton (OG 1839–43), artist and President of the Royal Academy
- Eylon Levy (OG ?-?), Israeli government spokesperson
- Cecil Arthur Lewis (OG ?-?), Oscar winner for adapting the screenplay of Pygmalion.
- Geoffrey Lewis Lewis (OG ?-?), linguist, Emeritus Professor of Turkish at Oxford University and Emeritus Fellow of St Antony's College
- Martin Lewis (OG ?-?), humorist, producer and broadcaster
- Nathaniel Lindley, 1st Baron Lindley, (OG 1837–45), Master of the Rolls, Lord of Appeal in Ordinary
- Dennis Lloyd, Baron Lloyd of Hampstead (OG 1929–31, Chairman of Council 1971–79), Quain Professor of Jurisprudence in the University of London, Chairman of the National Film School 1970–1988

== M ==
- Professor D.S. MacColl (OG 1873–76), Keeper of the Wallace Collection.
- René MacColl (1905–1971), cricketer and journalist
- John Allan McNab (1948-55), president, The Chartered Institute of Management Accountants 1995-6
- Sir Philip Magnus, MP (circa 1855–60?), educational reformer and Member of Parliament for London University.
- Sir Edward Manville (OG 1874–78), chairman of the Imperial Council of Commerce
- Lord Marshall of Knightsbridge (OG ?-?), former chairman and chief executive of British Airways.
- Lieutenant Horace Robert Martineau (OG ?-?), recipient of the Victoria Cross
- Rev Dr. John Howard Bertram Masterman, (OG ?-?), Suffragan Bishop of Plymouth and author
- John Preston Maxwell (OG ?-?), missionary, President of the Chinese Society of Obstetrics and Gynaecology.
- David McCallum, actor and musician.
- Sir Andrew McFadyean (OG ?-?), senior civil servant, General Secretary to the Reparation Commission 1919, Chairman of S.G. Warburg and Co, Chairman of the Royal Institute of International Affairs
- China Miéville (OG ?-?), author
- Max Minghella (OG 1999–2004), actor
- Sir Ernest William Moir (OG ?-?) - Civil engineer who invented the first medical airlock
- John Morley, 1st Viscount Morley of Blackburn, (OG 1853–54), Secretary of State for India
- Richard Morrison, (OG 1965-1972), chief culture writer, The Times
- Rev William Stainton Moses (OG ?-?), Christian Spiritualist leader and medium, President of the London Spiritualist Alliance (1884-death).
- Rodrigo Moynihan, artist
- Alexander Muirhead (OG ?-?), developed the first electrocardiogram, one of the developers of wireless telegraphy

== N ==
- Ronald Neame (OG ?-?), British screenwriter and director
- Jimmy Napes (OG 1996 - 2003), Producer

== O ==
- Tom Oppé (OG ?-?), paediatrician, 1984–

== P ==
- Professor Karl Pearson (OG 1866–73), founder of Department of Applied Statistics of University College London
- Sir Roger Penrose , mathematician, Emeritus Rouse Ball Professor of Mathematics University of Oxford, winner of the Nobel Prize for Physics 2020
- Sir Claude Phillips (OG 1856–58), Keeper of the Wallace Collection
- Professor Vivian de Sola Pinto, poet, literary critic and historian
- Richard Bissell Prosser, engineer and inventor

== Q ==
- Professor Peter Quilliam, General Secretary of the British Pharmacology Society (1968–71), Professor of Pharmacology King's College London

== R ==
- Sir Walter Raleigh (OG 1877–79), Professor of English Literature, University of Oxford
- Sir Boverton Redwood, 1st Baronet Boverton (OG 1857–61), chemist and petroleum expert
- Andrew Reid, lawyer, racehorse trainer and Treasurer of the UK Independence Party
- Daniel Roche (2011-2018), actor
- Henry Ling Roth (1855–1925), anthropologist, active in Australia
- Walter Roth, anthropologist, after whom the Walter Roth Museum of Anthropology in Georgetown, Guyana was named
- Edward John Routh, mathematician, winner of the Adams Prize in 1877, fellow of the Royal Society, also contributed to Routh–Hurwitz theorem and Routh stability criterion.
- Dick Rubenstein, Major, British Army

== S ==
- Rev Michael Sadgrove (OG 1959–67), Provost, then Dean of Sheffield 1995; Dean of Durham 2003
- Herbert Samuel, 1st Viscount Samuel (OG 1884–88), Leader of the Liberal Party, Home Secretary and High Commissioner for Palestine
- Gordon Samuels, Governor of New South Wales (1996–2001)
- Reverend David Say, bishop of Rochester (1961–1988)
- Ben Schott (OG 1987–1992), author of Schott's Miscellanies
- Admiral Sir Percy Scott (OG 1865–66), instrumental in developing gunnery and other equipment for the Royal Navy
- Will Self, writer
- Stanley Shaldon, nephrologist
- Sir Arthur Everett Shipley (OG 1877–79), Master of Christ's College, Cambridge 1910–1927, Vice-Chancellor of the University of Cambridge 1917–1919
- Walter Sickert (OG 1870–71), artist and critic
- Professor Cedric Smith (OG 1932–35), statistician and geneticist
- Kenneth Snowman, chairman of Wartski
- Richard Solomons, chief executive of InterContinental Hotels Group
- Professor Edward Adolf Sonnenschein, (OG 1867–68), philologist, professor of classics and dean of the Faculty of Arts, the University of Birmingham
- Stephen Spender, poet
- Marion Harry Spielmann (OG 1872-66), historian of Punch, editor of The Magazine of Art.
- Rev. Edward Steere (OG 1842–44), Bishop of Central Africa
- Frederic George Stephens, art critic and 'Nonartistic' member of the Pre-Raphaelite Brotherhood
- Colonel H.F. Stephens (OG 1877–83), railway engineer and manager
- Lord Wandsworth Sydney Stern, 1st Baron Wandsworth, (OG 1857–58), MP and banker, whose estate founded Lord Wandsworth College
- Greville Stevens, English cricketer, Ashes winner, Wisden Cricketer of the Year in 1918
- Desmond Surfleet, Middlesex cricketer
- Fred Susskind (OG 1902–09), South African test match cricketer
- Rev. Arthur Sweatman (OG 1848–50), Archbishop of Toronto and Primate of all Canada
- Maj.-Gen. Sir Ernest Dunlop Swinton (OG 1878–83), assistant secretary (Military), Committee of Imperial Defence and War Cabinet in World War One, later Chichele Professor of Military History, University of Oxford
- David Sylvester, art critic and curator
- James Joseph Sylvester (OG 1828), professor of mathematics at the Royal Military Academy, inaugural professor of mathematics at Johns Hopkins University, Professor at Oxford University

== T ==
- Sir Geoffrey Ingram Taylor (OG 1899–1905?), physicist and mathematician
- Gordon Thomson (OG 1893–99), Olympic rower
- Francis Taylor, Liberal MP for Norfolk South 1885–1898
- Matthew Taylor, Liberal Democrat MP (1987–present)
- James Thomas (Australian politician), engineer and politician
- Sir Hamo Thornycroft (OG 1863–68), artist and sculptor
- Captain Norman Todd, airline pilot who captained the first commercial flight of a British Airways Concorde
- Wilfred Trotter (OG 1888–90), pioneer in neurosurgery
- Dr Mark Turin (OG 1981–91), linguistic anthropologist

== V ==
- John William Van Druten (OG 1911–17), playwright.
- Sir Julius Vogel Two-time Prime Minister of New Zealand, (Chairman of Old Boys Dining Society 1877)
- Ed Vulliamy, journalist (The Guardian & The Observer) and author

== W ==
- Dan Wagner, internet entrepreneur
- Sir Francis Walshe, neurologist
- Charles Warton, MP, Attorney general of Western Australia
- Edwin Waterhouse (OG 1855–57), president of the Institute of Chartered Accountants in England & Wales
- Julian Lloyd Webber, cellist
- Sir Arnold Wesker, dramatist
- Ben Winston Producer
- Philip Wicksteed, economist and clergyman.
- Professor Robin Wilson, mathematician, Gresham Professor of Geometry
- Ben Winston, television and film producer
- Jonathan Wittenberg, Masorti Rabbi
- Roland De Wolfe, professional poker player.

== Y ==
- Sir Alfred Yarrow, (OG 1855–58), ship building industrialist and philanthropist

== Z ==
- Oliver Zangwill Professor of Psychology, University of Cambridge.

== See also ==
- Category:People educated at University College School
