= Portrait of Madame Récamier =

Painting by Jacques-Louis David

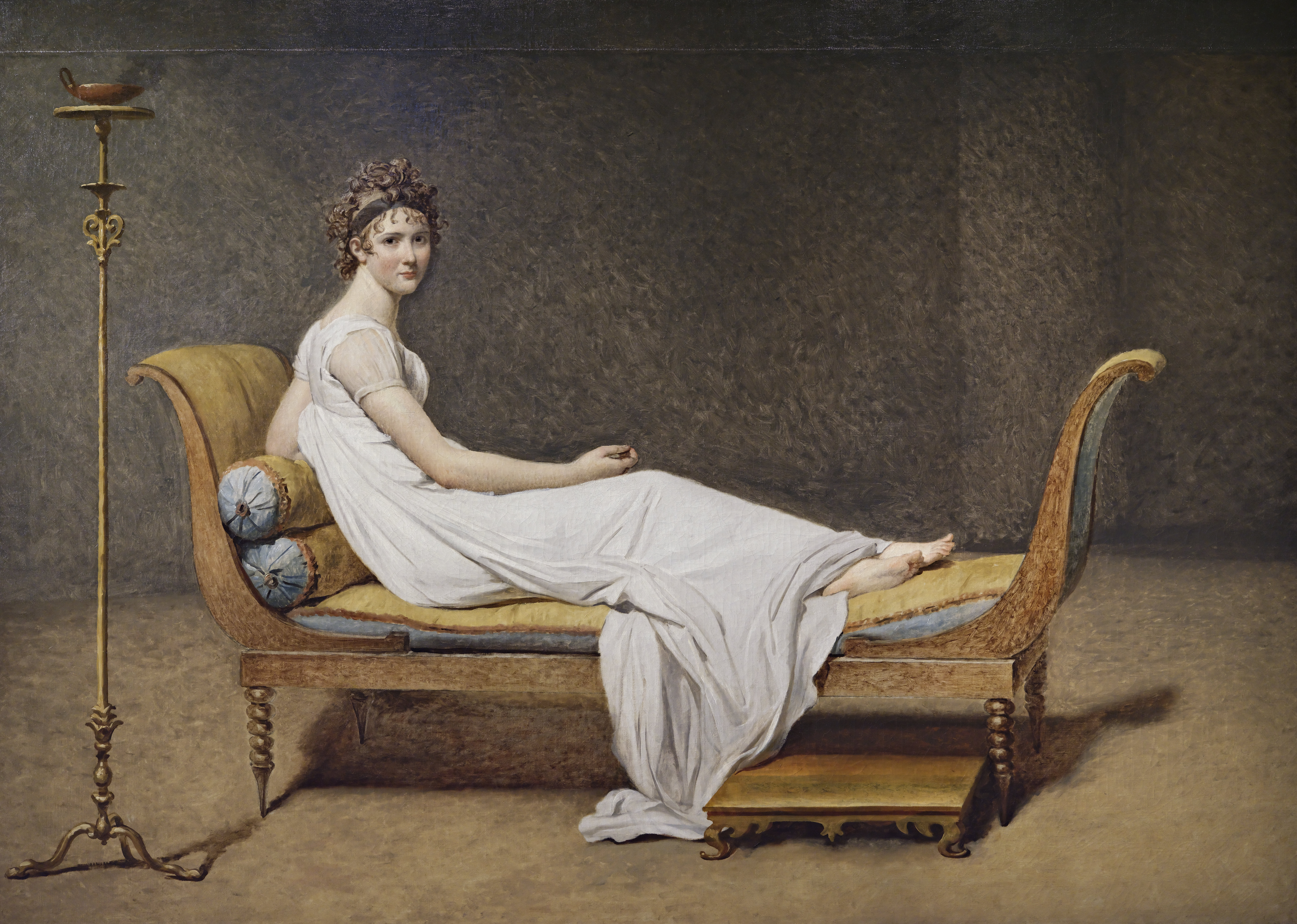
- Artist: Jacques-Louis David
- Year: 1800
- Medium: Oil on canvas
- Dimensions: 174 cm × 224 cm (68.50 in × 88.58 in)
- Location: Louvre; Paris

Portrait of Madame Récamier is an 1800 portrait of the Parisian socialite Juliette Récamier by Jacques-Louis David showing her in the height of Neoclassical fashion, reclining on a Directoire style sofa in a simple Empire line dress with almost bare arms, and short hair "à la Titus." The work is unfinished.

== Description ==
The work is notable for the distance that it establishes between viewer and subject. The setting is a sparsely decorated interior, featuring a tall bronze candelabrum fixed with an oil lamp, which has been extinguished and whose smoke drifts into the blackness of the space. A light from above provides some illumination, highlighting her perfectly spotless white dress. There is not much variation in color; only muted earthy tones of brown, green, and grey are present aside from the draperies of the model. Madame Récamier appears separate and distinct in her own space, a sparsely decorated setting with Classical furniture in the Pompeian style. The woman reclines on her French méridienne sofa, also known as a fainting couch, popular in the 19th century. Her pose suggest grace and elegance through the curvature delineated by the lines of her legs, back, and arm. The horizontal portrait format was innovative for its time, when vertical compositions were most common.

The composition is unfinished, as indicated in the communications between the artist and Madame Récamier, as well as in undeveloped areas of the work. In letters that survive between Mme. Recamier and David, she says 'je serai à vos ordres pour la séance", meaning "I will be at your service for the session". However she was consistently late for her sittings and rather spoiled, leading to a quarrel between the model and artist, and the work was never retouched. Only Récamier's head is completely finished, with great detail given to each lock of hair, which has been finely styled and arranged, as well as her porcelain cheeks dabbed with rouge. Yet her dress lacks any highlights, and the accompanying furniture, floor, and background are rendered in loose brushstrokes. In some areas, the priming layer is visible.

== Background ==
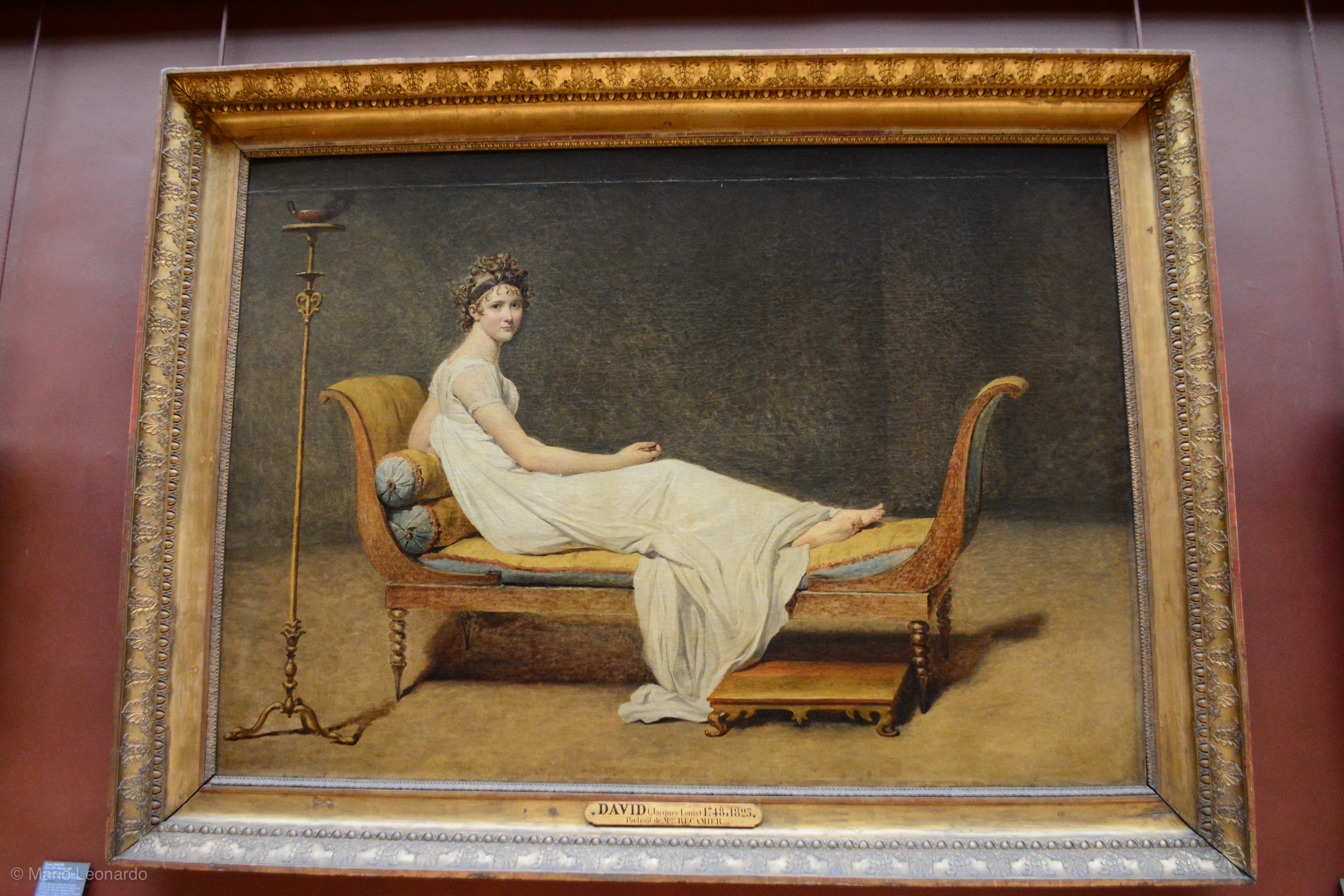
Portrait of Madame Recamier, at the Louvre Museum

Madame Juliette Récamier was a Neoclassical French icon, salon hostess, and influential Parisian socialite in elite French circles of the time. Wife of a French banker and daughter of a banker from Lyon, she was considered to be among the most beautiful socialites of her time. She was rarely seen without an entourage of male suitors. and was renowned for both her wit and romantic affairs. The esteemed French poet and dramatist Théophile Gautier wrote of her "indescribable attraction, like the poetry of the unknown". Prominent authors, such as Mme. de Stael, modeled some of her protagonists on Récamier.

It was at the age of 23 that she began to model for various artists of the early 19th century in France, including David. Her likeness was captured in David's Neoclassical portrait, yet was abandoned, much to the subject's dismay. Originally, he intended to capture not only her appearance, but also the ideals of femininity and charm. David began the painting in May 1800 but may have left it unfinished when he learned that Récamier, having grown impatient with David, commissioned his student François Gérard to paint her portrait (Gerard's portrait was completed in 1805). David's painting was acquired by the Louvre in 1826, over twenty years after it was begun. Yet it was warmly welcomed, and according to Scottish painter and art critic, D.S. MacColl, "from 1826 his unfinished Madame Recamier has spoken for something better in the Louvre, and since then a whole series of portraits have accrued which will prove his lasting security when 'Horatii,’ 'Sabines,’ and the rest have gone the dusty way to respectable oblivion".

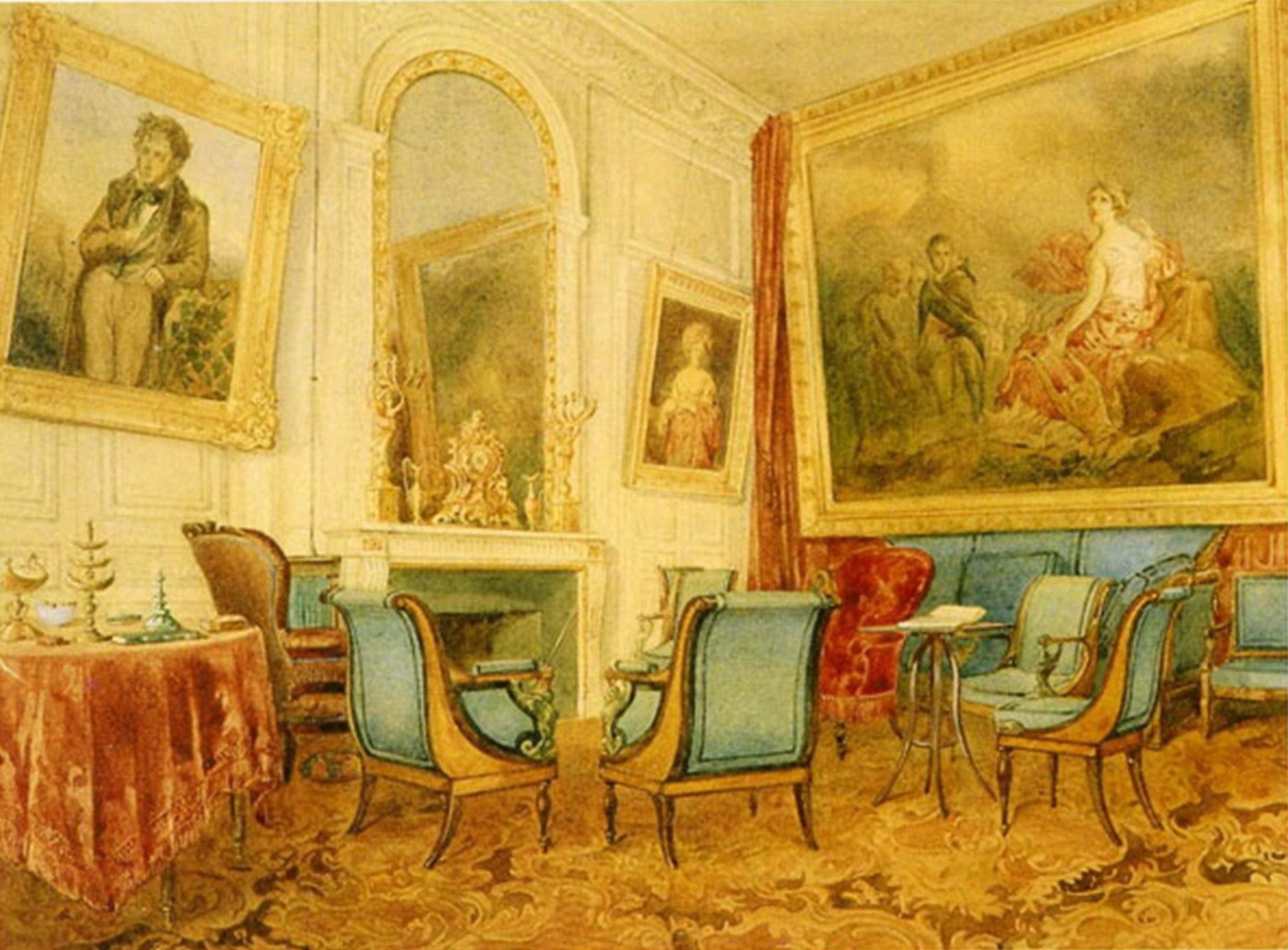
Le salon de Madame Récamier à l'Abbaye-aux-Bois

In Creatures in an Alphabet, Djuna Barnes wrote of the subject as:

The Seal, she lounges like a bride,

Much too docile, there's no doubt;

Madame Récamier, on side,

(if such she has), and bottom out.

== Influence ==
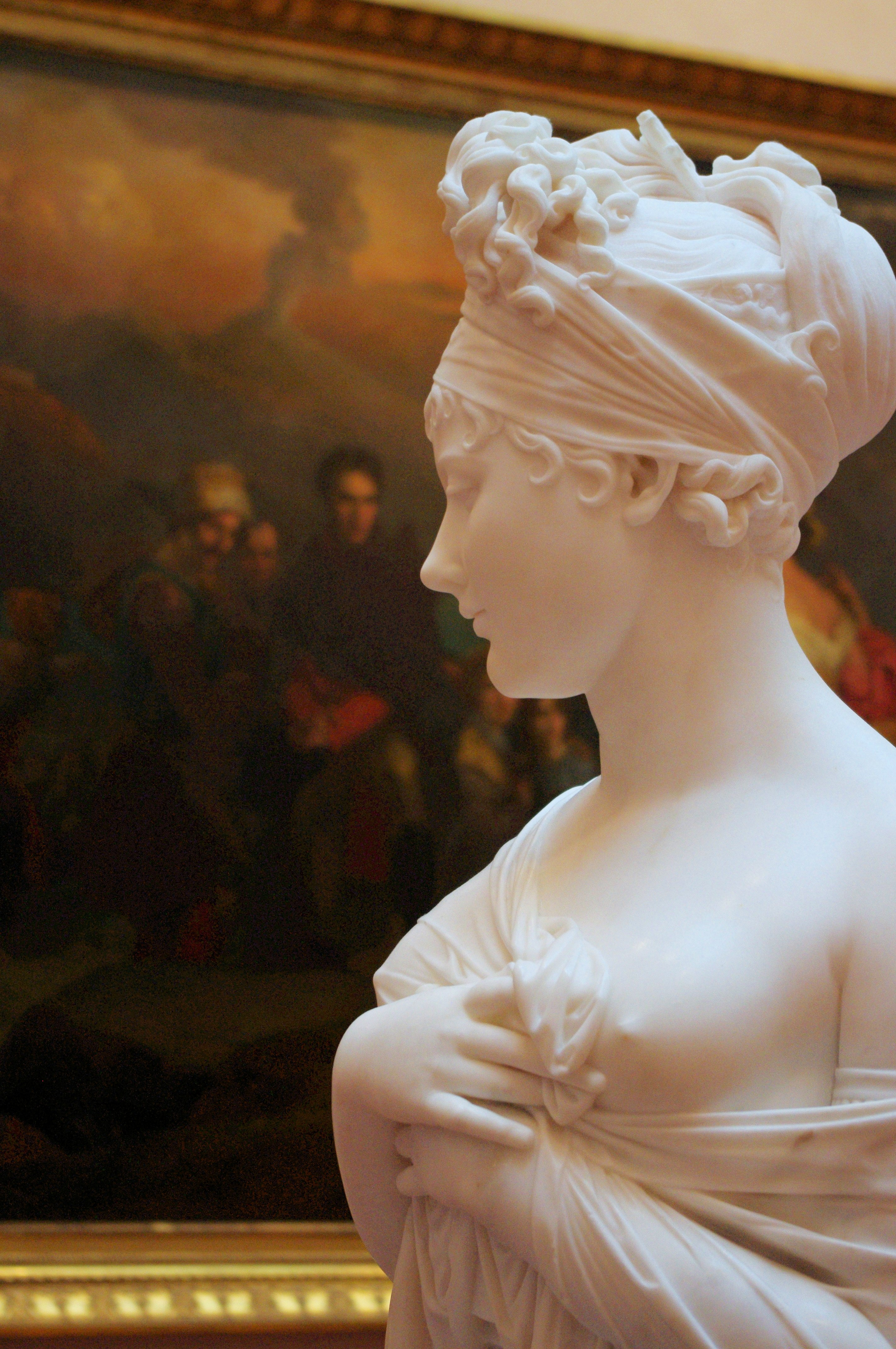
Bust of Juliette Recamier, Joseph Chinard, 1801

Despite David's opinion, shared by most at the time, that portraiture was a lesser genre of painting, his works in the genre were widely celebrated among his contemporaries, many of whom posed as his subjects. Other portraits made in David's circle during the period exemplify the Neoclassical approach to portraiture. Portrait of a Young Woman in White depicts a fair, young Frenchwoman in Roman dress, adorned with a Roman pillar, sumptuous royal maroon draperies, and other historic elements offset by contemporary feminine qualities that would have been recognized by viewers. This piece is visually and thematically consistent with the techniques used in the 1800 painting of Madame Récamier.

Because of her prominence in French society, Madame Récamier was painted by many artists. François Gérard created several portraits of her, including an 1805 portrait and an 1829 crayon noir. The 1805 portrait bears similarities to David's composition, yet is more saccharine and feminine, and emphasizes the Roman influences with a background of such architecture and garments.The work is not as coyly coquettish as David's; Récamier directly addresses her audience, gazing into the viewer's eyes with a downturned, sweet smile that radiates the gracefulness of her soft demeanor. Additionally, Antoine-Jean Gros produced a portrait of her later in life, from the year 1825, wherein she is depicted in the Romantic style in elaborate costume and coy position, consistent with previous portraits of her yet respecting her graceful aging.

David, Gros, and Gerard were not the only artists to use Madame Récamier as a subject; the terracotta bust by Joseph Chinard of the Parisian socialite from 1801 similarly captures her elegance. Here, she conceals her left breast while exposing her right, evoking a coquettishly feminine demeanor. The juxtaposition established here between the figure of the classical nude and the suggestion of sexual behavior is the essence of this Neoclassical revival.

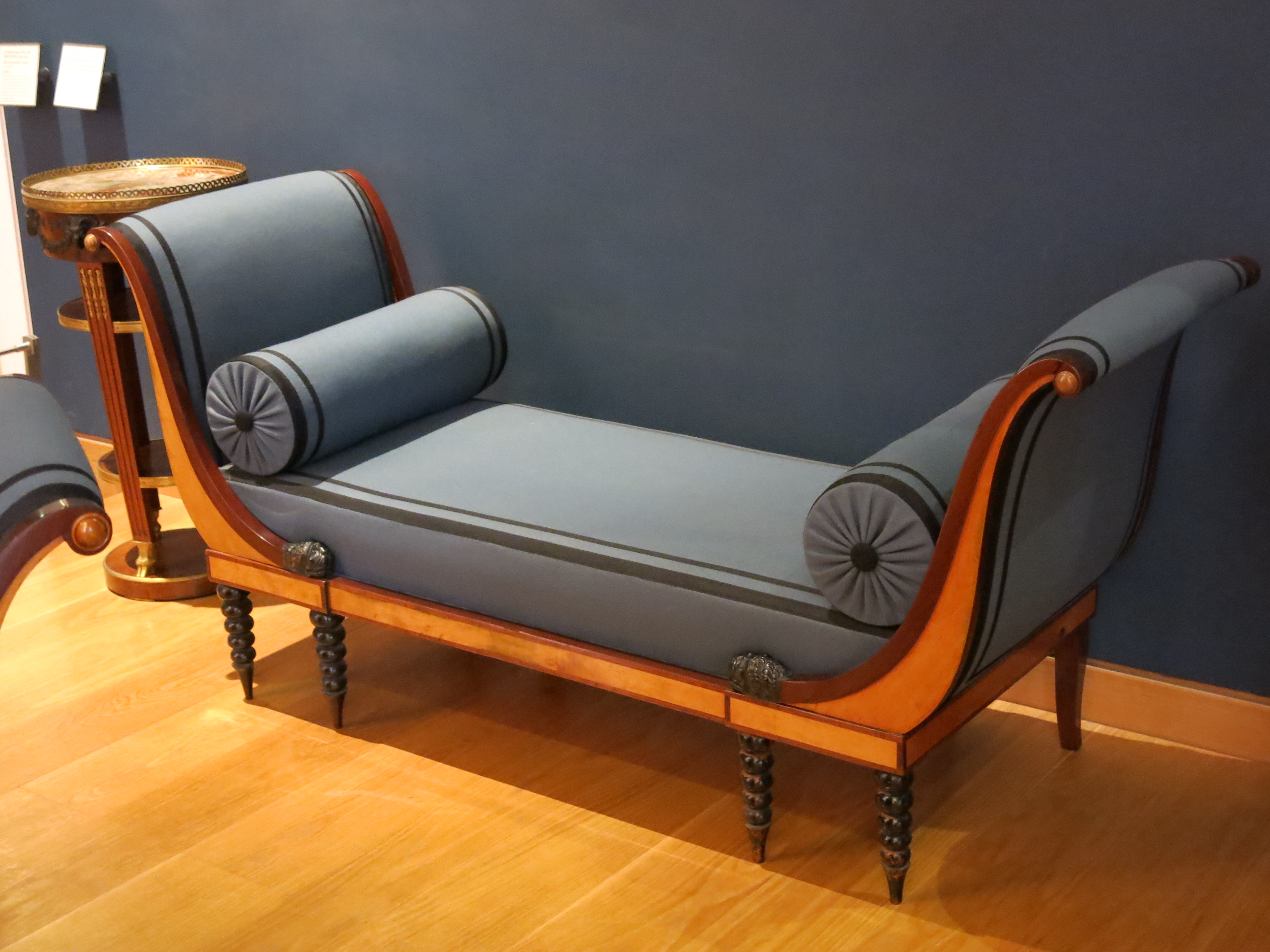
From the Salon de Madame Récamière, a Récamière, circa 1798, Louvre Museum

== Legacy ==
The work has had substantial implications in the art world. The sofa on which Madame Récamier reclines is now known as a récamier, a backless couch with a high curved headrest and low footrest. Récamier had such seats in her own Salon, now housed at the Louvre.

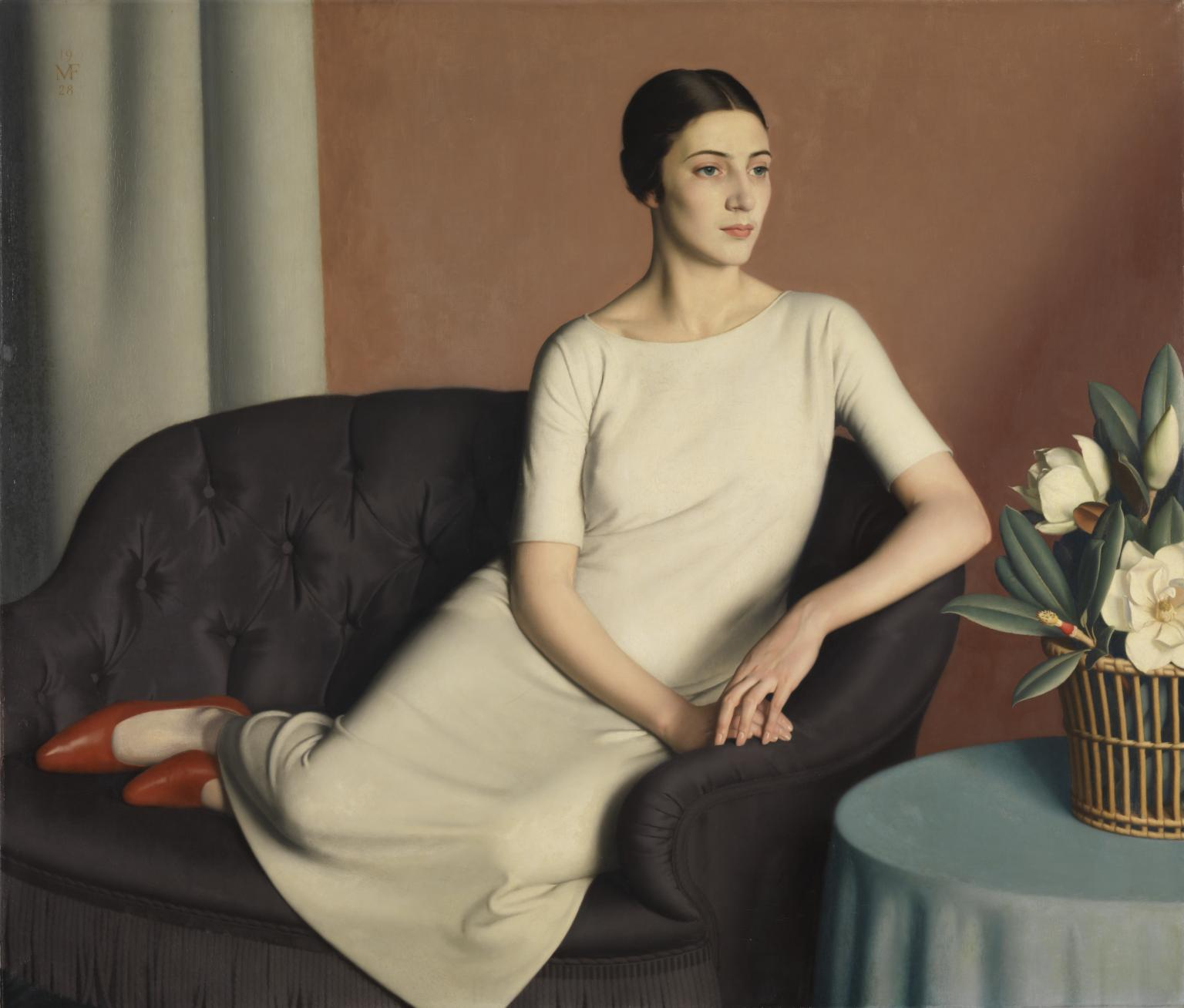
Portrait of Marguerite Kelsey, Meredith Frampton,1928

The notable form and iconography of David's work has rendered it a staple in the history of art, and many artists have taken inspiration from the composition. The pose of a reclining figure looking back over her shoulder was adopted in 1814 by Ingres for his Grande Odalisque. Twentieth century artist Meredith Frampton directly borrowed the position of Madame Récamier for the pose of Marguerite Kelsey, a British model, in her 1928 portrait. The British Art Journalcompares the two works: "The [artist's] portrait of Marguerite Kelsey likewise encapsulates classical qualities of order and calm, the model's white dress and presentation on the sofa recalling the celebrated neoclassical Portrait of Madame Recamier by Jacques-Louis-David (1800, Louvre).

Prominent surrealist painter René Magritte also parodied David's painting in his Perspective: Madame Récamier by David, showing a coffin reclining, now in the National Gallery of Canada. The series features several works, all based on David's painting. Magritte recreates David's composition, but the model is a coffin, not a fair-skinned Parisian beauty. Both death and laughter are recurrent themes in Magritte's series, in which the original individual is replaced by the macabre. This sense of morbidity is counteracted with the humor of the piece, hinting at the inevitability of death and the ephemerality of life—a far cry from David's intended message with his original portrait. The series nonetheless conveys a powerful allegory of the delicate nature of human life, through intense visual contrast and typical surrealist darkness.

== See also ==
- List of paintings by Jacques-Louis David
