= Quilliam =

Quilliam is a surname of Manx origin, meaning "William's son" (Manx: mac William), and may refer to:

- John Quilliam (1771–1829), a British Royal Navy officer and the First Lieutenant on HMS Victory at the Battle of Trafalgar
- Peter Quilliam (1920–2004), a New Zealand lawyer
- Peter Quilliam (pharmacologist) (1915–2003), a British pharmacologist
- Susan Quilliam (born 1950), an agony aunt and author noted for bringing systemic psychology to a mass audience
- Wayne Quilliam (born 1963), Australian photographer
- William Abdullah Quilliam (1856–1932), a 19th-century convert from Christianity to Islam, founder of England's first mosque and Islamic centre

== Other things named Quilliam ==
- Quilliam (think tank), a former British anti-Islamist think tank
- HMS Quilliam (G09), a Q class destroyer in the Royal Navy during World War II, and the Royal Netherlands Navy 1946–1957
