= William Swan Sonnenschein =

English publisher (1855–1931)

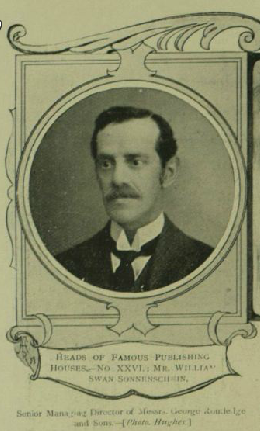
- Illustrated London News, 6 November 1909
- Born: 5 May 1855; United Kingdom
- Died: 31 January 1931 (aged 75); United Kingdom
- Other names: William Swan Stallybrass, W.S.W. Anson
- Scientific career
- Fields: Publishing, editing, bibliography
- Workplaces: Williams and Norgate; W. Swan Sonnenschein & Co.; George Routledge & Sons

William Swan Sonnenschein (5 May 1855 – 31 January 1931), known from 1917 as William Swan Stallybrass, was a British publisher, editor and bibliographer. His publishing firm, Swan Sonnenschein, published scholarly works in the fields of philosophy and the social sciences. as well as general literature and periodicals. In 1902 he became the senior managing director of the British publishing firm George Routledge & Sons.

== Career ==
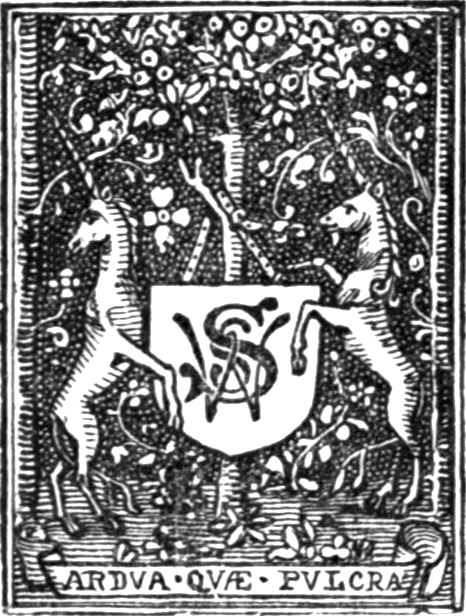
Logo of W. Swan Sonnenschein & Co. (inspired by Thielman Kerver's publisher's mark).

In his youth Sonnenschein was apprenticed to the London publishers and book importers Williams and Norgate. In 1878 he founded the publishing firm, W. Swan Sonnenschein & Allen, with the first of several partners, J. Archibald Allen. In 1882 the firm's name was restyled to W. Swan Sonnenschein & Co. In 1895 the firm became a limited liability company.

Under him the firm published several renowned book series, including the Library of Philosophy (1890–1911) and the Social Science Series. The firm also acquired a reputation for publishing radical works, including those of George Bernard Shaw, Karl Marx, and Edward Carpenter. Other major authors published were J. M. Barrie, Henry James, George Meredith and George Moore.

He was a member of the Ethical Society and published its literature.

In 1902 he left Swan Sonnenschein to work as senior managing director at the publishing house George Routledge & Sons. Later he took up a position at Kegan Paul.

In 1911 the firm Swan Sonnenschein became amalgamated with George Allen & Co.

Sonnenschein wrote The Best Books, a multivolume general bibliography that became a standard reference book in larger libraries for many years. Its third edition (1910) was described by The New York Times as a "valuable work".

== Family ==
He was one of six children of Adolphus (Adolf) Sonnenschein, a teacher and writer originally from Moravia (now the Czech Republic) and his first wife, Sarah Robinson Stallybrass. One of his brothers was the English classical scholar Edward Adolf Sonnenschein.

He married Helena Teulon in 1882. William and Helena had two children: the jurist and university administrator William Teulon Swan Sonnenschein and Frances Helena Swan Sonnenschein.

In 1917, responding to increasing anti-German hostility in Britain during World War I, he dropped his Germanic-sounding surname "Sonnenschein" and adopted his mother's maiden name, being thereafter known as "William Swan Stallybrass". Similarly, his wife and children changed their names to Helena Stallybrass, William Teulon Swan Stallybrass and Frances Helena Swan Stallybrass respectively.

== Books written ==
- The best books : a reader's guide to the choice of the best available books (about 25,000) in every department of science, art, and literature, with the dates of the first and last editions, and the prize, size and publisher's name of each book. A contribution towards classified bibliography. London: Swan Sonnenschein, Lowrey & Co., 1887.
- The best books : a reader's guide to the choice of the best available books (about 100,000) in every department of science, art, and literature, with the dates of the first and last editions, and the prize, size and publisher's name (both English and American) of each book. A contribution towards systematic bibliography. 3rd ed. London: George Routledge and Sons, 1910–35.

== Books edited ==
- Esquemeling, John. The Buccaneers of America. A true account of the most remarkable assaults committed of late years upon the Coast of the West Indies by the Buccaneers of Jamaica and Tortuga, both English and French. London: George Routledge, n.d. [1923]. A translation of the 1684–85 revision and edited by W. S. Stalleybrass. With an introduction by Andrew Lang. XX, 480, 8pp. With frontispiece, 10 full-page plates, and text figures.
- The Epic of the Beast, Consisting of English Translations of The History of Reynard the Fox and Physiologus. London: George Routledge & Sons Ltd., 1924. Text of "Reynard" as translated and printed by William Caxton in 1481 and modernised here by William Swan Stallybrass. Introduction by William Rose. Glossarial index and notes to Caxton's words and phrases. "Physiologus" translated, with an introduction, by James Carlill. Illustrated throughout with Kaulbach plates. xxxviii + 277 pp.
