= Juliette Récamier =

French salon-holder (1777–1849)

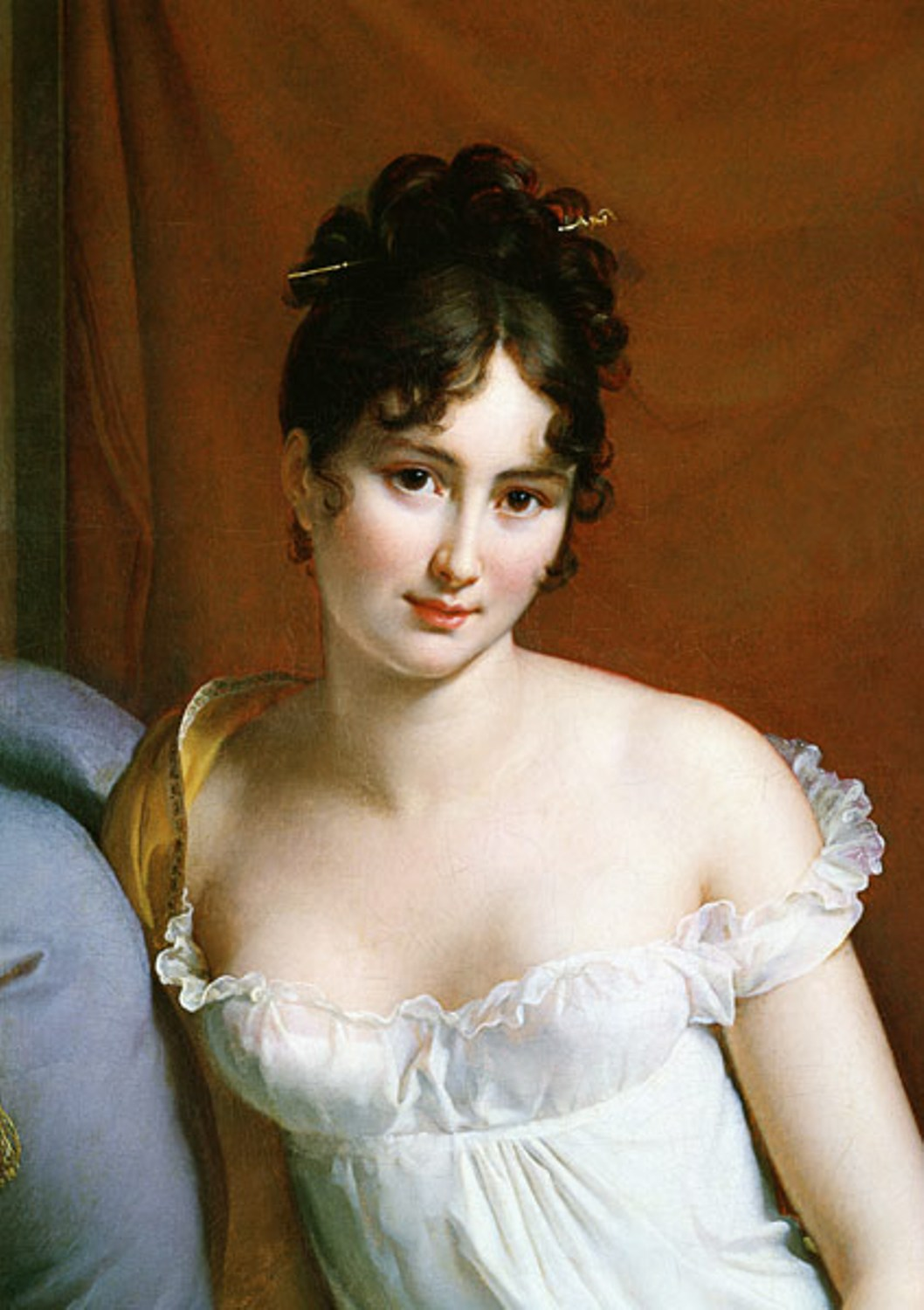
- Portrait by François Gérard, 1805 (detail), Paris, Carnavalet Museum
- Born: 3 December 1777; Lyon, France
- Died: 11 May 1849 (aged 71); Paris, France
- Occupation: Salonnière
- Spouse: Jacques-Rose Récamier (m. 1793; died 1830)

Jeanne Françoise Julie Adélaïde Récamier (French: [ʒan fʁɑ̃swaz ʒyli adela.id ʁekamje]; 3 December 1777 – 11 May 1849), known as Juliette (French: [ʒyljɛt]), was a French socialite whose salon drew people from the leading literary and political circles of early 19th-century Paris. An icon of neoclassicism, Récamier cultivated a public persona as a great beauty, and her fame quickly spread across Europe. She befriended many intellectuals, sat for the finest artists of the age, and spurned an offer of marriage from Prince Augustus of Prussia.

== Family and education ==
A native of Lyon, she was the only child of notary and King's counsellor Jean Bernard and his wife, the former Julie Matton. In 1784, her father was named receiver of finance under Calonne. She was briefly educated at the Couvent de la Déserte in Lyon, until her family moved to Paris. The name "Juliette" came about as a diminutive of "Julie". Beautiful, accomplished, and possessing a love of literature, Récamier was described as shy and modest by nature.

== Early marriage ==
At the age of fifteen, she was married on 24 April 1793 to Jacques-Rose Récamier (1751–1830), a banker nearly thirty years her senior and a relative of the gourmet Brillat-Savarin. In relaying the news to a friend of his impending marriage to Juliette, Jacques wrote:

I am not in love with her, but I feel for her a genuine and tender attachment which convinces me that this interesting creature will be a partner who will ensure the happiness of my whole life and, judging by my own desire to ensure her happiness, of which I can see she is absolutely convinced, I have no doubt that the benefit will be reciprocal .... She possesses germs of virtue and principle such as are seldom seen so highly developed at so early an age; she is tender-hearted, affectionate, charitable and kind, beloved in her home-circle and by all who know her.

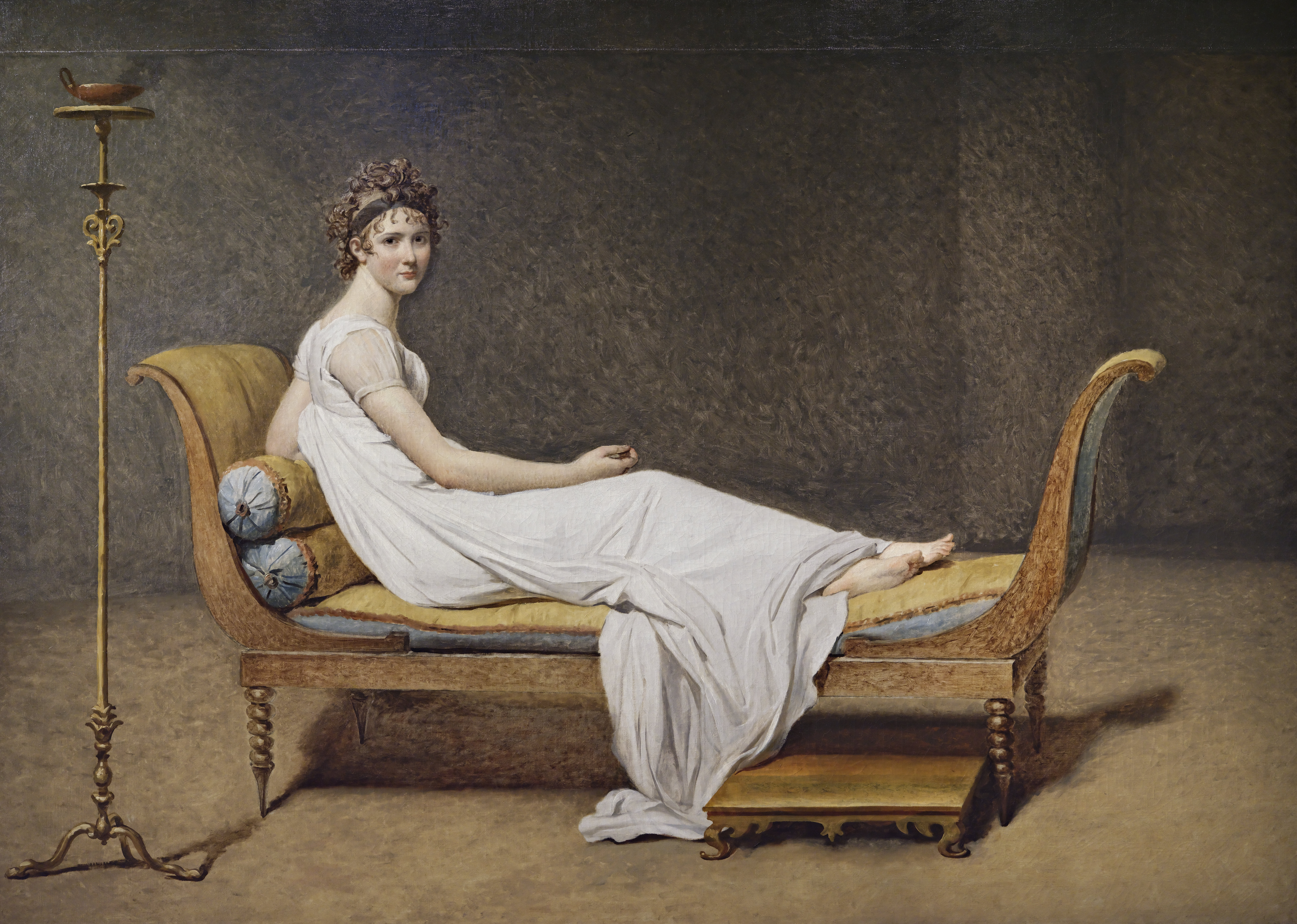
Portrait of Madame Récamier by Jacques-Louis David (1800, Louvre)

A rumour arose that her husband was, in fact, her natural father who married her to make her his heir. Their marriage occurred at the height of the revolutionary terror and, if he were guillotined, she would inherit his money. Although many biographers have given credence to this theory, it is unproven and discounted by several historians. Curiously, however, Jacques once wrote to a friend that his relations with Madame Bernard may have been more than platonic:

It may be said that my feelings for the daughter arise out of those I have had for her mother; but all those who frequent the house are well aware that what took me there was pure friendship, a friendship which had grown out of the possibly somewhat warmer feeling I may have had in the earlier days of our acquaintance. At present, having reached an age when all other pretensions are past, she only wishes to educate her child, and make her a virtuous and good woman.

The marriage was never consummated, and Récamier remained a virgin until at least the age of forty. A rumour was initiated by writer Prosper Mérimée that she suffered from a physical condition which made the act of sexual intercourse painful. This, however, did not inhibit her charm, as many individuals including François-René de Chateaubriand were said to have had intense emotional relationships with her. Chateaubriand was a constant visitor of her salon and, in a manner, master of the house.

== European celebrity ==
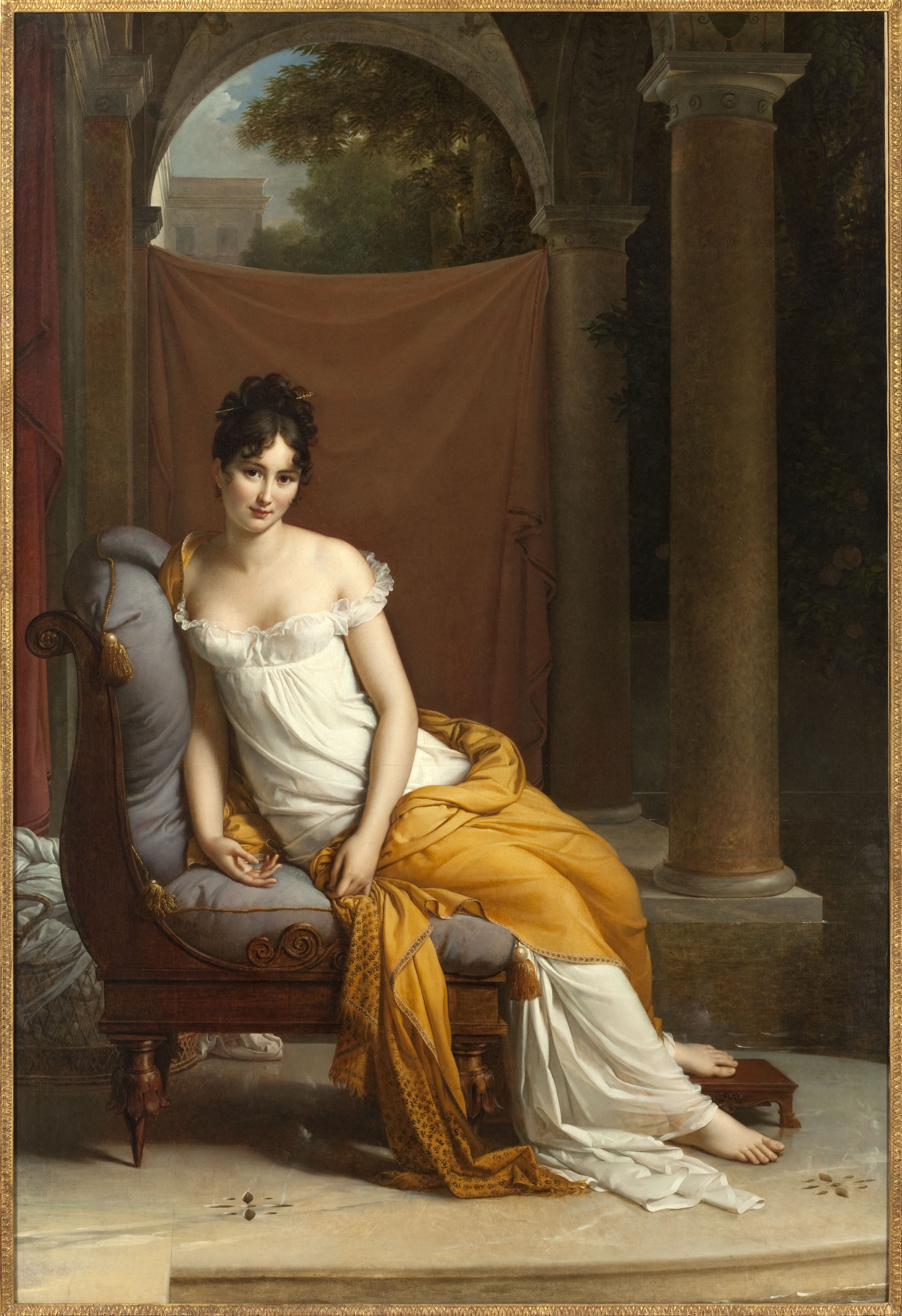
Portrait by François Pascal Simon, Baron Gérard, 1802

From the earliest days of the French Consulate to almost the end of the July Monarchy, Récamier's salon in Paris was one of the chief resorts of literary and political society that followed what was fashionable. The habitués of her house included many former royalists, with others, such as General Jean Bernadotte and General Jean Victor Moreau, more or less disaffected to the government. This circumstance, together with her refusal to act as lady-in-waiting to Empress consort Joséphine de Beauharnais and her friendship for Germaine de Staël, brought her under suspicion. In 1800 Jacques-Louis David began his portrait of her, but left it unfinished on learning François Gérard had been commissioned to paint a portrait before he had.

It was through Germaine de Staël that Récamier became acquainted with Benjamin Constant, a Swiss-French political activist and writer, whose political equivocations during the last days of the First French Empire and the first of the Bourbon Restoration have been attributed to her persuasions. She was eventually exiled from Paris by the orders of Napoleon. After a short stay at her native Lyon, she proceeded to Rome, and finally to Naples. There she was on exceedingly good terms with Joachim Murat and his wife Caroline Bonaparte, who were then intriguing with the Bourbons. She persuaded Constant to plead the claims of Murat in a memorandum addressed to the Congress of Vienna, and also induced him to take up a decided attitude in opposition to Napoleon's return during the Hundred Days.

== Later years ==
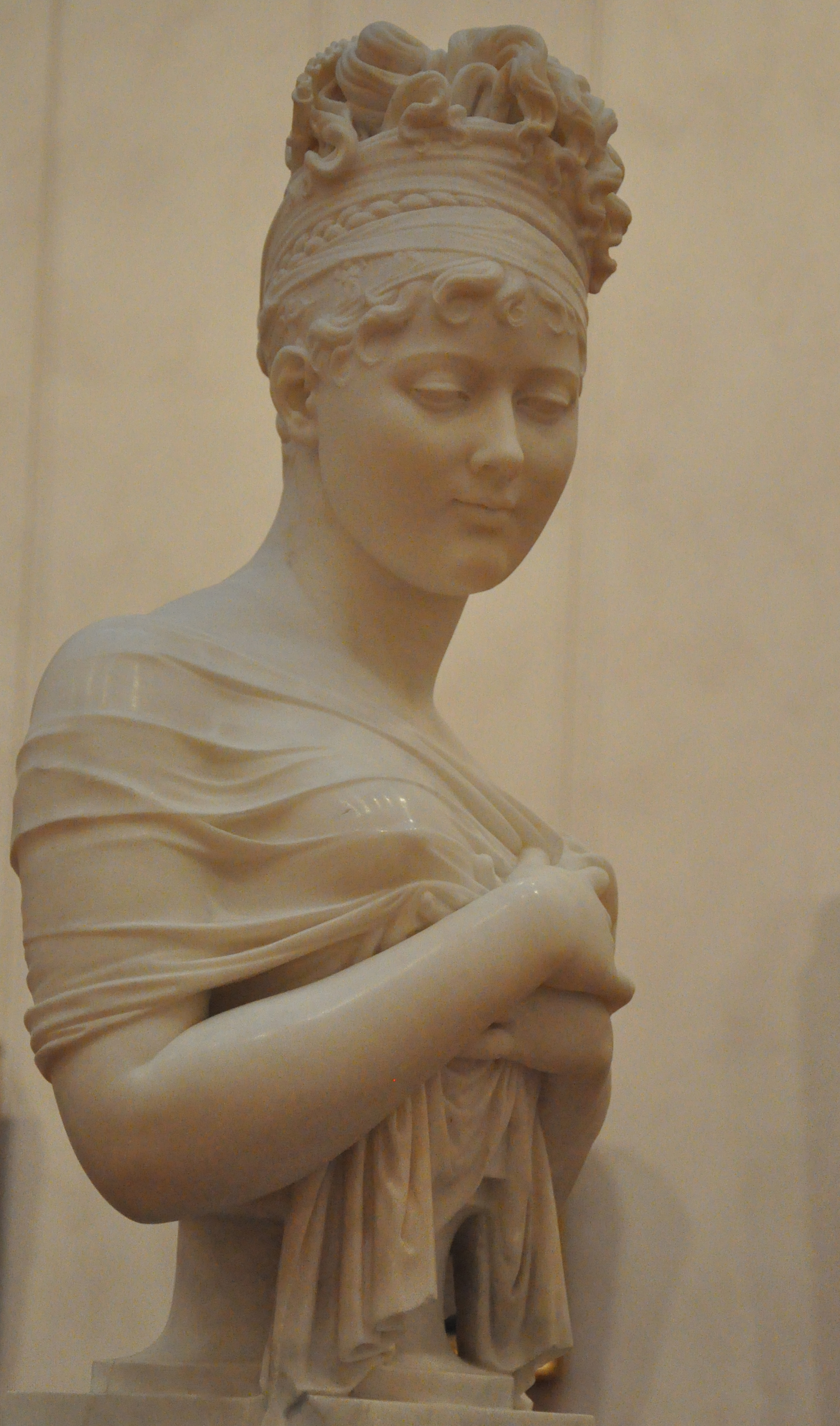
Bust by Joseph Chinard, 1803

Récamier's husband had sustained heavy financial losses in 1805, and she visited Germaine de Staël at Coppet in Switzerland. There was a project for her divorce, in order that she might marry Prince Augustus of Prussia, but, though her husband was willing, it was not arranged. In her later days she lost most of what was left of her fortune; but she continued to receive visitors in her apartment at Abbaye-aux-Bois, a 17th-century convent (demolished in 1907) situated at 16 rue de Sèvres in Paris, to which she retired in 1819.

Despite old age, ill-health, partial blindness, and reduced circumstances, Récamier never lost her attractiveness, though at least one man who met her, artist Guillaume Gavarni, opined that she "stank of the lower middle class." And although she numbered among her admirers Mathieu de Montmorency, Lucien Bonaparte, Prince Augustus of Prussia (whose marriage proposal she rejected), Pierre-Simon Ballanche, Jean-Jacques Ampère, and Benjamin Constant, none of them obtained over her so great an influence as did Chateaubriand, though she suffered much from his imperious temper. If she had any genuine affection, it seems to have been for the baron de Barante, whom she met at Coppet.

In 1849, Récamier died in Paris of cholera at the age of 71 and was buried in the Cimetière de Montmartre in Montmartre, at the time a village north of Paris.

== Cultural legacy ==
Madame Récamier (1920)

A type of sofa or chaise longue on which she liked to recline, the récamier, was named after her.

She was the subject of two silent films. A 1920 German film Madame Récamier starring Fern Andra and a 1928 French film Madame Récamier.

== Gallery ==
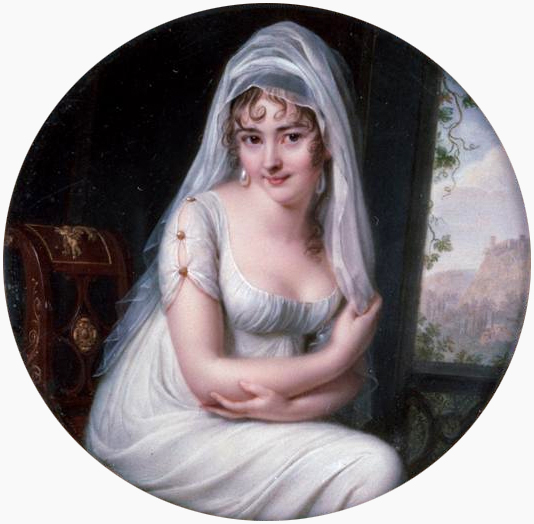
Portrait by Jean-Baptiste Augustin (1801)

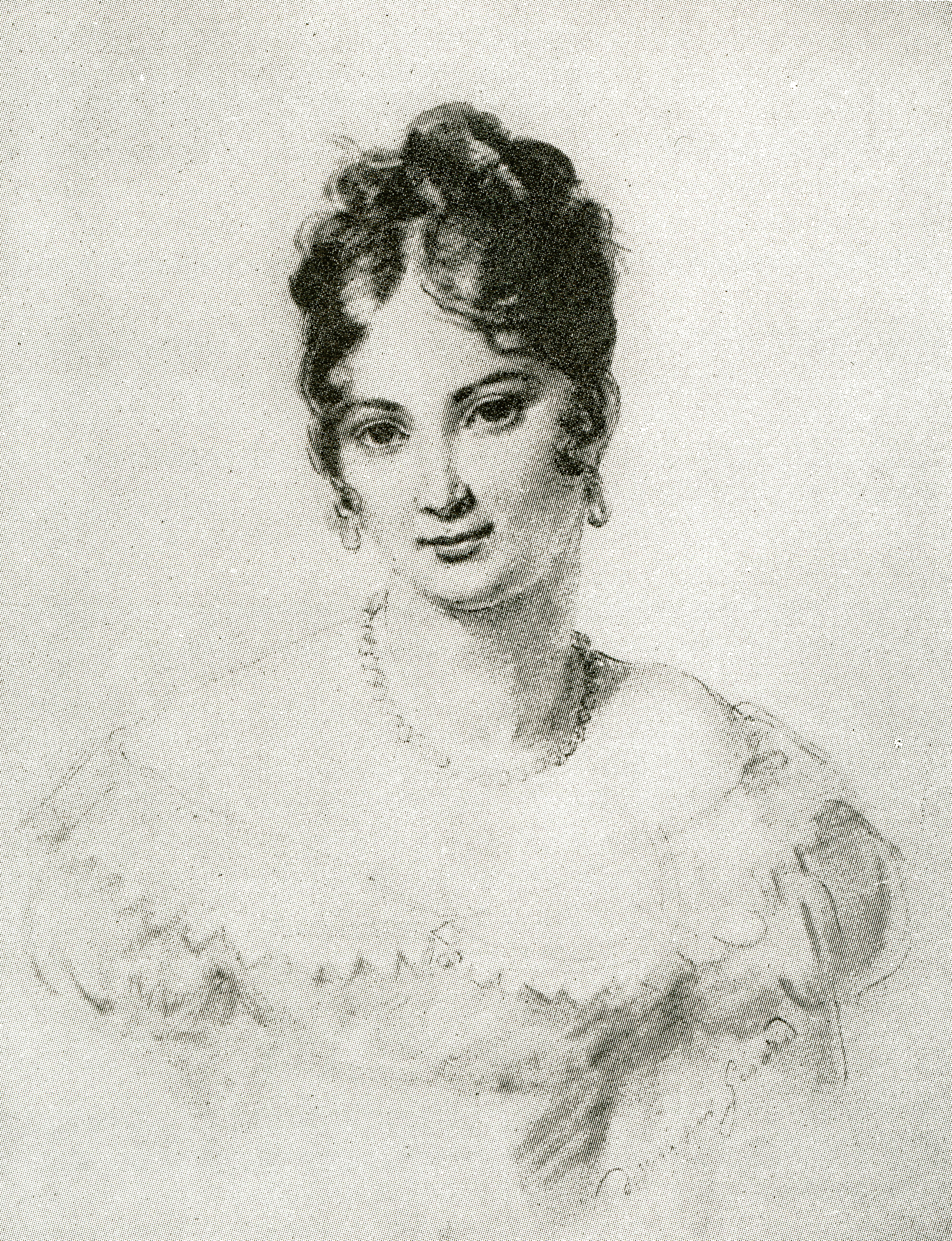
Portrait by François Gérard (1805)

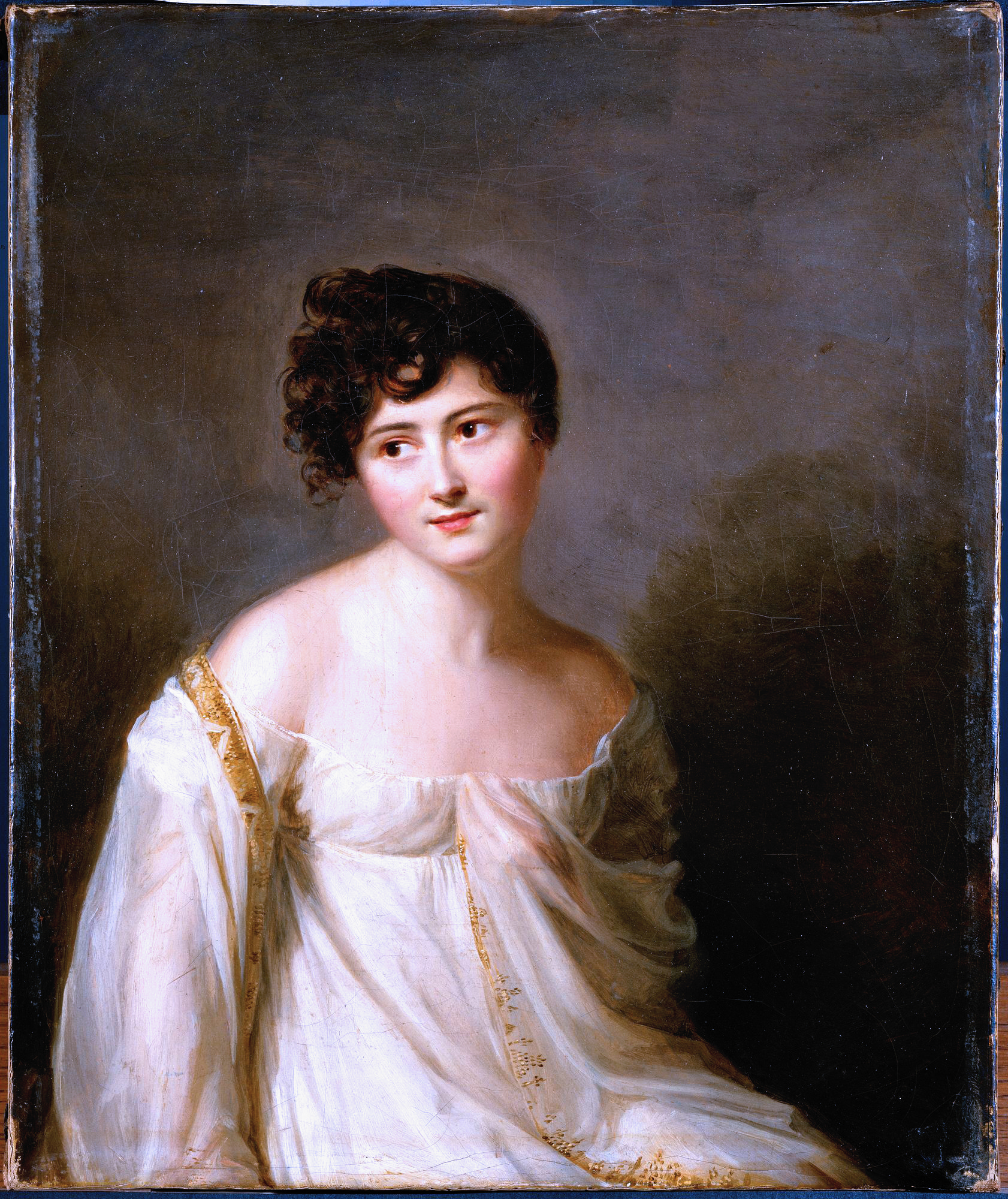
Canvas by Firmin Massot (1807)

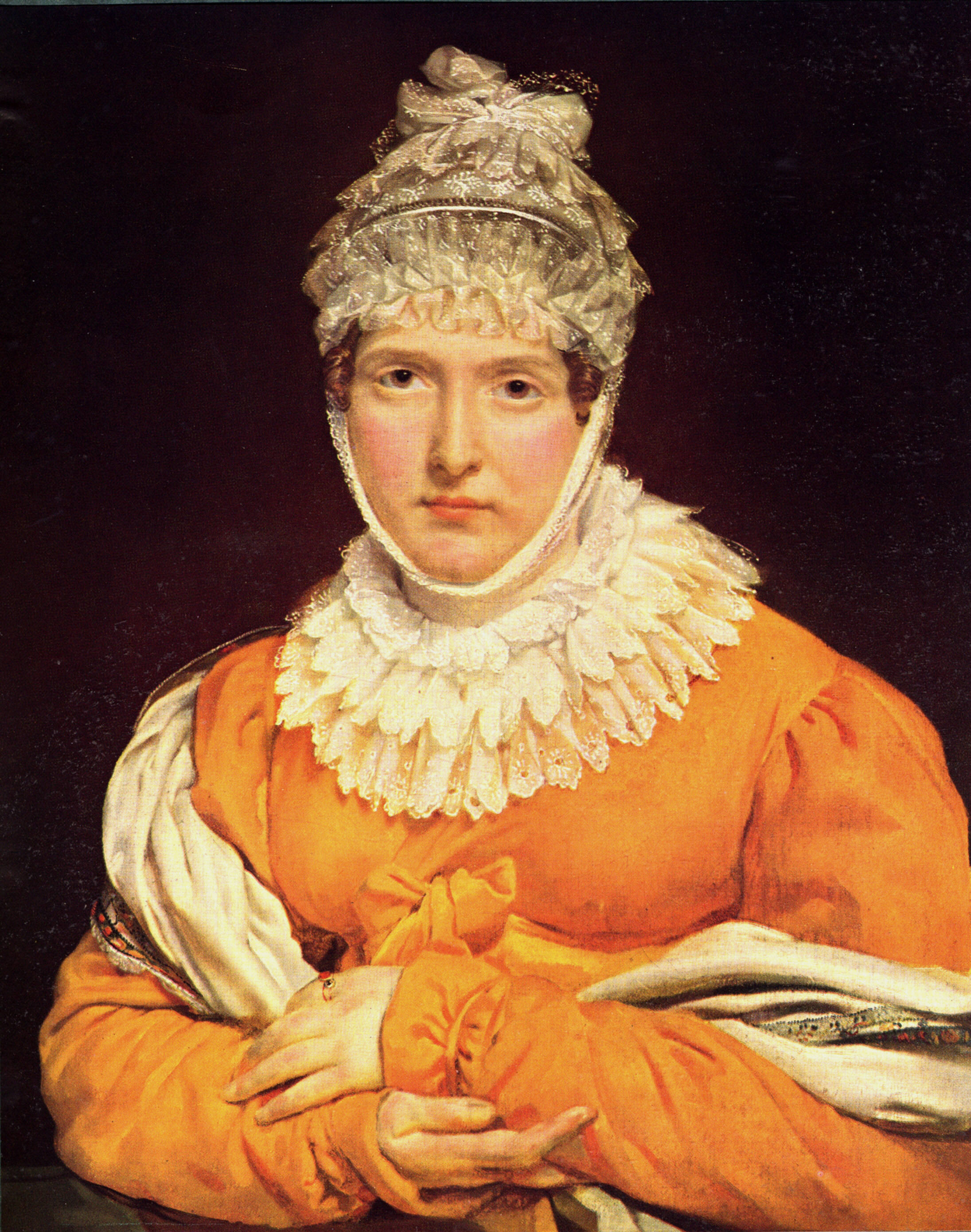
Portrait of Madame Récamier by Antoine-Jean Gros (1825)

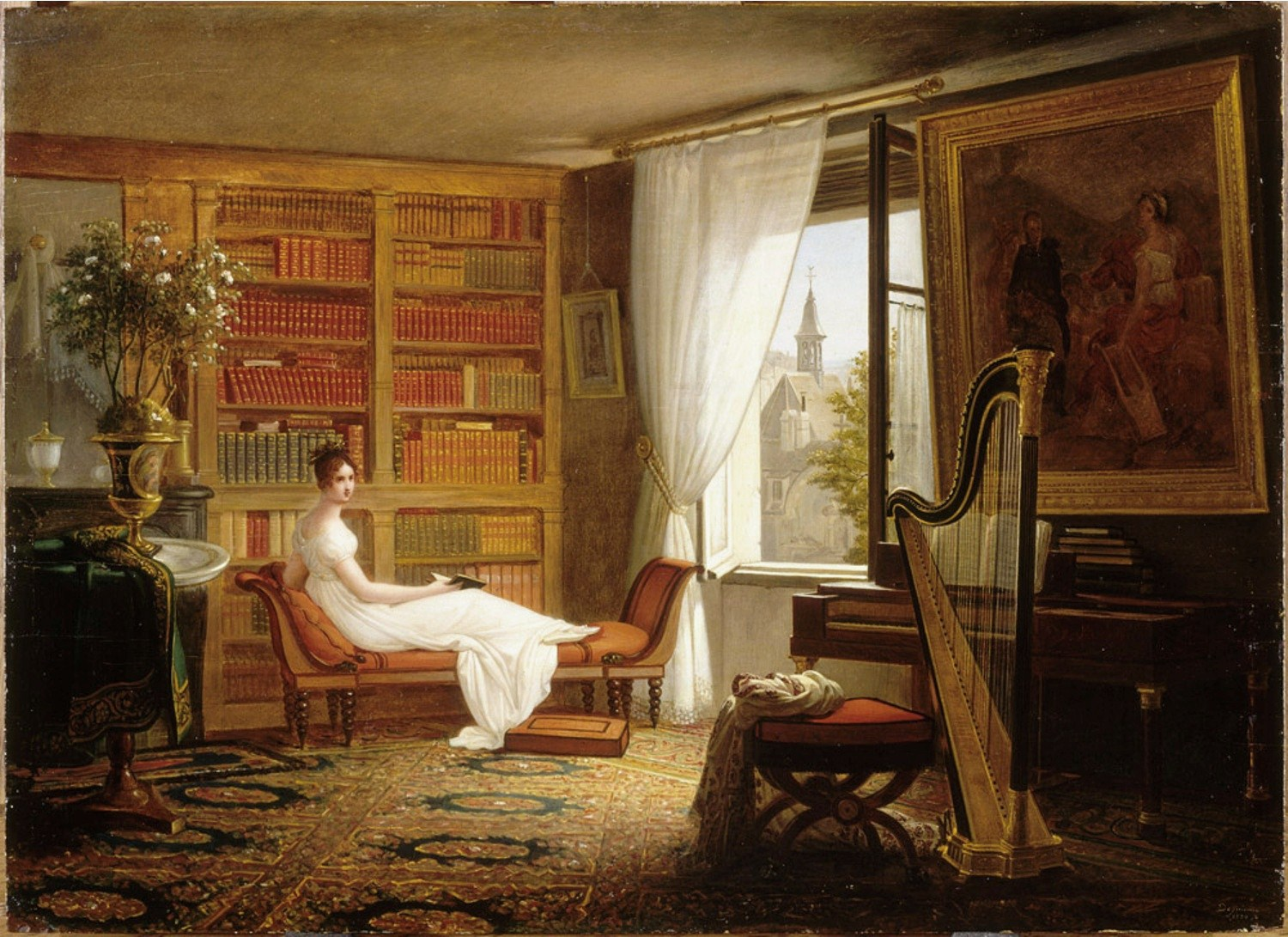
Portrait by François-Louis Dejuinne (1827)

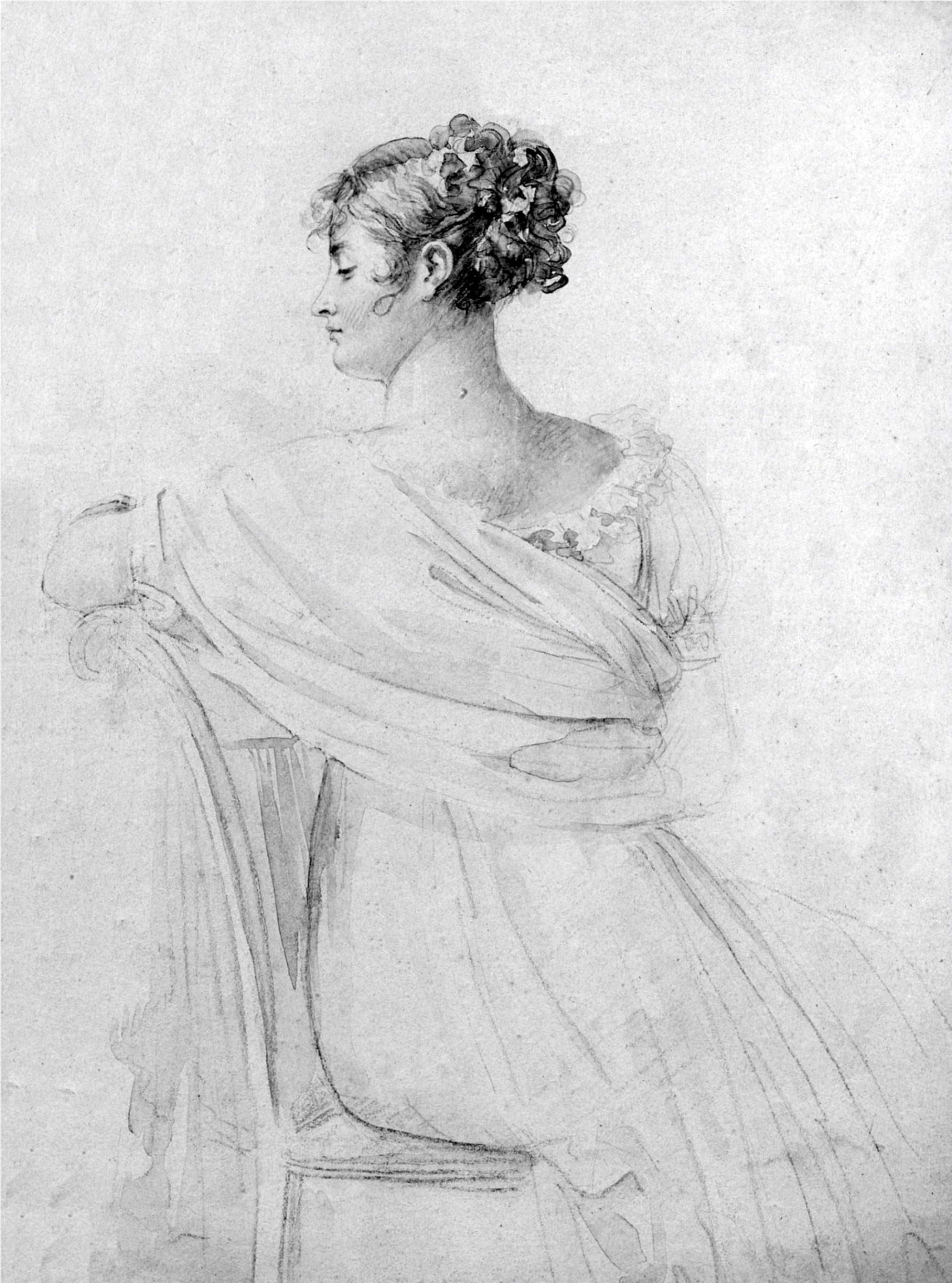
Crayon noir by François Gérard (1829)

== See also ==
- Jean Anthelme Brillat-Savarin
- Germaine de Stael
- Francois-Rene de Chateaubriand
- Jacques-Louis David
- Francois, Baron Gerard
- Jacques-Rose Recamier
- Prince Augustus of Prussia

== Bibliography ==
- Levaillant, Maurice (1958). The passionate exiles: Madame de Staël and Madame Récamier. Farrar, Straus and Cudahy. ISBN 9780836980868.
- Hillman, Susanne (2018). "Gilt by Association: The Collaborative Celebrity of Germaine de Staël and Juliette Récamier". Journal of Women's History. 30 (1): 56–79. doi:10.1353/jowh.2018.0003. ISSN 1527-2036. S2CID 150101095.
- Récamier, Jeanne Françoise Julie Adélaïde Bernard (1868). Lettres inédites et souvenirs biographiques de Mme Récamier & de Mme de Staël (in French). Ve Jules Renouard.
- Memoirs and Correspondence of Madame Récamier (English)
- Wolfgang, Aurora (1999). "A Passion Between Women: The Case of Germaine de Staël and Juliette Récamier". Women in French Studies. 7 (1): 66–78. doi:10.1353/wfs.1999.0020. ISSN 2166-5486. S2CID 147148461.
- Lenormant, Amelie. Souvenirs et correspondances tirés des papiers de Madame Récamier (1859)
- Amélie Lenormant, Madame Récamier, les amis de sa jeunesse et sa correspondance intime (1872)
- Mary Elizabeth Mohl, Madame Récamier, with a sketch of the history of society in France (1821 and 1862)
- François Guizot in the Revue des deux mondes (December 1859 and February 1873)
- H. Noel Williams, Madame Récamier, and her Friends (London, 1901)
- Édouard Herriot (Engl. trans., by Alys Hallard), Madame Récamier et ses amis (1904)
