= Edward Adolf Sonnenschein =

Edward Adolf Sonnenschein (20 November 1851 – 2 September 1929, Bath) was an English classical scholar and writer on Latin grammar and verse.

== Career ==
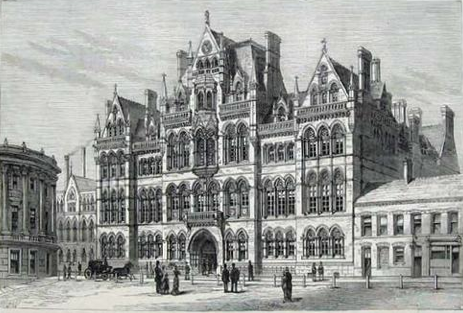
Mason College, now the University of Birmingham

Sonnenschein was educated at University College School and then in 1868 at University College London.

He was appointed Oxford professor of Greek and Latin at Mason College (afterwards the University of Birmingham) in 1883, staying there until 1918. He was a Plautine scholar, publishing editions of Captivi (1879), Mostellaria (1884), and Rudens (1891). He took up the reform of grammar teaching, and published the "Parallel Grammar" series. With John Percival Postgate, he founded the Classical Association in 1903.

Much of his grammatical research was summed up in The Unity of the Latin Subjunctive (1910) and The Soul of Grammar (1927). He insisted upon the humanities taking their proper place in the modern university, and took up the question of war-guilt during the European war; he was a very exact scholar.

== Family ==
Sonnenschein was born in London in 1851, the eldest son of a teacher, Adolphus (Adolf) Sonnenschein from Moravia (now part of the Czech Republic) and Sarah Robinson Stallybrass.

Edward Adolf Sonnenschein married Edith Annesley Bolton (1854–1943) and they had three children: Edward Jamie, who later took the surname Somerset; Christopher Edward, who was killed in a mountaineering accident in Switzerland on 22 February 1914; and Edward Oliver, who survived the sinking of HMS Pathfinder in 1914, and later took his grandmother's surname Stallybrass. (Because of the hostility to Germans during the First World War, two of his sons changed their surnames to English names.)

== Swan Sonnenschein, publishers ==
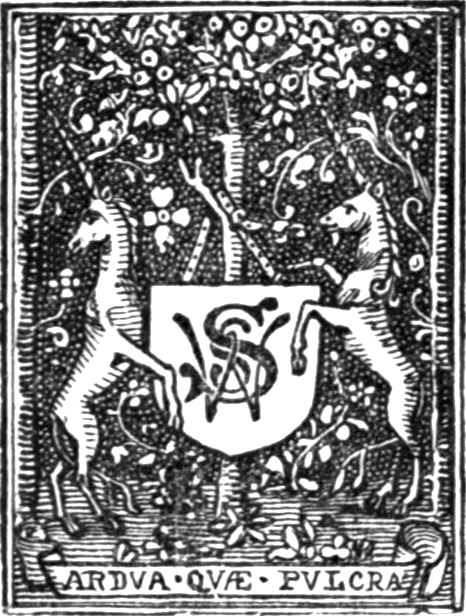
Logo of W Swan Sonnenschein & Co

William Swan Sonnenschein (1855–1934), Adolfus Sonnenschein's third son and Edward's younger brother, founded the family publishing firm that was to become known as Swan Sonnenschein.

As a young man William was apprenticed to the firm of Williams and Norgate, where he gained experience of second hand bookselling before founding his own company, W. Swan Sonnenschein & Allen, with the first of several partners, J. Archibald Allen, in 1878. This partnership was dissolved in 1882 when William married and the firm's name changed to W Swan Sonnenschein & Co. The firm published general literature and periodicals but specialized in sociology and politics. Sonnenschein was involved with the Ethical Society and published their literature.

In 1895 Swan Sonnenschein became a limited liability company, and in 1902 William Swan Sonnenschein left to work at George Routledge and Sons, and later at Kegan Paul. Swan Sonnenschein was amalgamated with George Allen & Co in 1911. He changed his 'German' surname during the First World War to Stallybrass. He died in 1934.

== Academic life and work ==
Sonnenschein was an influential classical scholar during his time at Mason College between 1883 and 1918, where he wrote prolifically. He edited several plays by Plautus, and collaborated with John Percival Postgate, forming the Classical Association in 1903, becoming its Secretary. He contributed to the 1911 Encyclopædia Britannica (designated by the initials "E. A. So.").

His views differed from Otto Jespersen (1860–1943) a Danish linguist, which he explained in his 1927 book, The Soul of Grammar, as his answer to Jespersen's 1924 Philosophy of Grammar. C. T. Onions, the last editor of the original Oxford English Dictionary, was one of his pupils.

== Works ==
- T. Macci Plavti Rvdens by Titus Maccius Plautus, 38 editions between 1891 and 1989.
- Mostellaria by Titus Maccius Plautus, 23 editions between 1884 and 1970.
- The Soul of Grammar, 5 editions between 1927 and 1929.
- A new English Grammar based on the recommendations of the Joint Committee on Grammatical Terminology, 17 editions between 1916 and 1962.
- Through German Eyes, 11 editions between 1914 and 1915.
- T. Macci Plauti Captivi by Titus Maccius Plautus, 30 editions between 1879 and 1903.
- Bentley's Plautine emendations from his copy of Gronovius by Richard Bentley, 6 editions between 1883 and 1963.
- A New Latin Grammar: based on the recommendations of the Joint Committee on Grammatical Terminology, 11 editions between 1912 and 1925.
- A Greek Grammar for Schools; based on the principles and requirements of the Grammatical Society, 18 editions between 1898 and 1929.
- The Unity of the Latin Subjunctive: a quest. Being a paper read in abstract before the Classical Association, 2 editions in 1910.
- Ora Maritima; a Latin story for beginners, 10 editions between 1902 and 1927; transcription on Latin Wikisource.
- Pro Patria; a Latin story for beginners, multiple editions 1903 onwards; transcription on Latin Wikisource.
- Recommendations of the Classical Association on the teaching of Latin and Greek, 2 editions in 1912.
- What is Rhythm? An essay, 2 editions in 1925.
- The Gateway; a book of Latin composition for middle forms, 4 editions in 1924.

== Sources ==
- The Oxford Concise Dictionary of National Biography: Sonnenschein, Edward Adolf (1851-1929).
- "Sonnenschein, Edward Adolf" (1907), Who's Who, 59: pp. 1643–1644.
- Edward Adolf Sonnenschein and the politics of linguistic authority in England 1880–1930, in A. Linn and N. McLelland (eds), Flores Grammaticae: Essays in memory of Vivien Law (Münster: Nodus), pp. 211–19.
- On Jevons’s logical machine. Edward Adolf Sonnenschein. Reprinted from the Proceedings of the Birmingham Philosophical Society, Vol. IV, Part 1. A paper read before the Society, 13 December 1883
- Sonnenschein Family details
