= Doyne Bell =

English antiquary and civil servant (1830–1888)

Doyne Courtenay Bell (3 August 1830 ― 26 March 1888) was an English court servant, antiquary, and composer.

== Early life ==
Bell was born in Gower Street, Bloomsbury, the son of a wine merchant. After University College School and King's College, London, he went to live in the Duchy of Brunswick to learn German, which he mastered. On his return to England, a clergyman uncle, George Hamilton, recommended him to Sir William Reid, who took him on as an assistant in the preparations for the Great Exhibition of 1851.

== Work ==
While the Exhibition was ongoing, Prince Albert, impressed by Bell's abilities, hired him to work in the royal household to help with Privy Purse correspondence.

Bell struck up a friendship with George Scharf, director of the National Portrait Gallery, a fellow Old Gower, and built up a good knowledge of historic portraits, not least those in the Royal Collection. Bell was also Secretary of the committee which after Prince Albert's death in 1861 planned the Albert Memorial in Hyde Park, finally completed in 1872.

Bell was a musical composer. Between 1868 and 1876, he published at least twenty settings for songs, works of the 17th century and of Wordsworth, Longfellow, Blake, and others. Dating from 1876, his setting to music of Blake's "Can I see another's woe", from Songs of Innocence and of Experience, is the earliest such work inspired by Blake now known.

In 1876, Bell was promoted to Permanent Secretary to the Keeper of the Privy Purse and remained in post until his death. His annual salary in 1888 was £300.

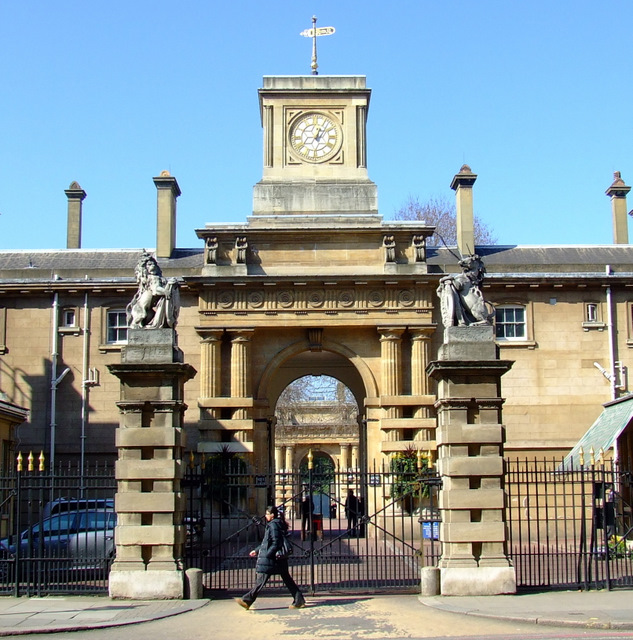
Entrance to the Royal Mews

In 1871, Bell studied the tombs of Richard II and Henry III at Westminster Abbey, and in 1877 was elected a Fellow of the Society of Antiquaries of London. His greatest work in that field was a study of the burials in the Church of St Peter ad Vincula in the Tower of London. By 1879, he had been elected as a member of the Council of the Society.

== Personal life ==
At the census of 1861, Bell was living at 50, Gower Street, with his parents, Robert and Laura Bell, an unmarried sister, and two female servants.

On 19 November 1862, at the church of St Mary-at-Lambeth, Bell married Amelia Sampson, the daughter of Thomas Sampson, a tailor. He gave his occupation as "Government Clerk" and signed his name as Doyne C. Bell. By 1871, he was a widower. In 1881 he was living in an apartment in the Royal Mews, with a cook and a housemaid.

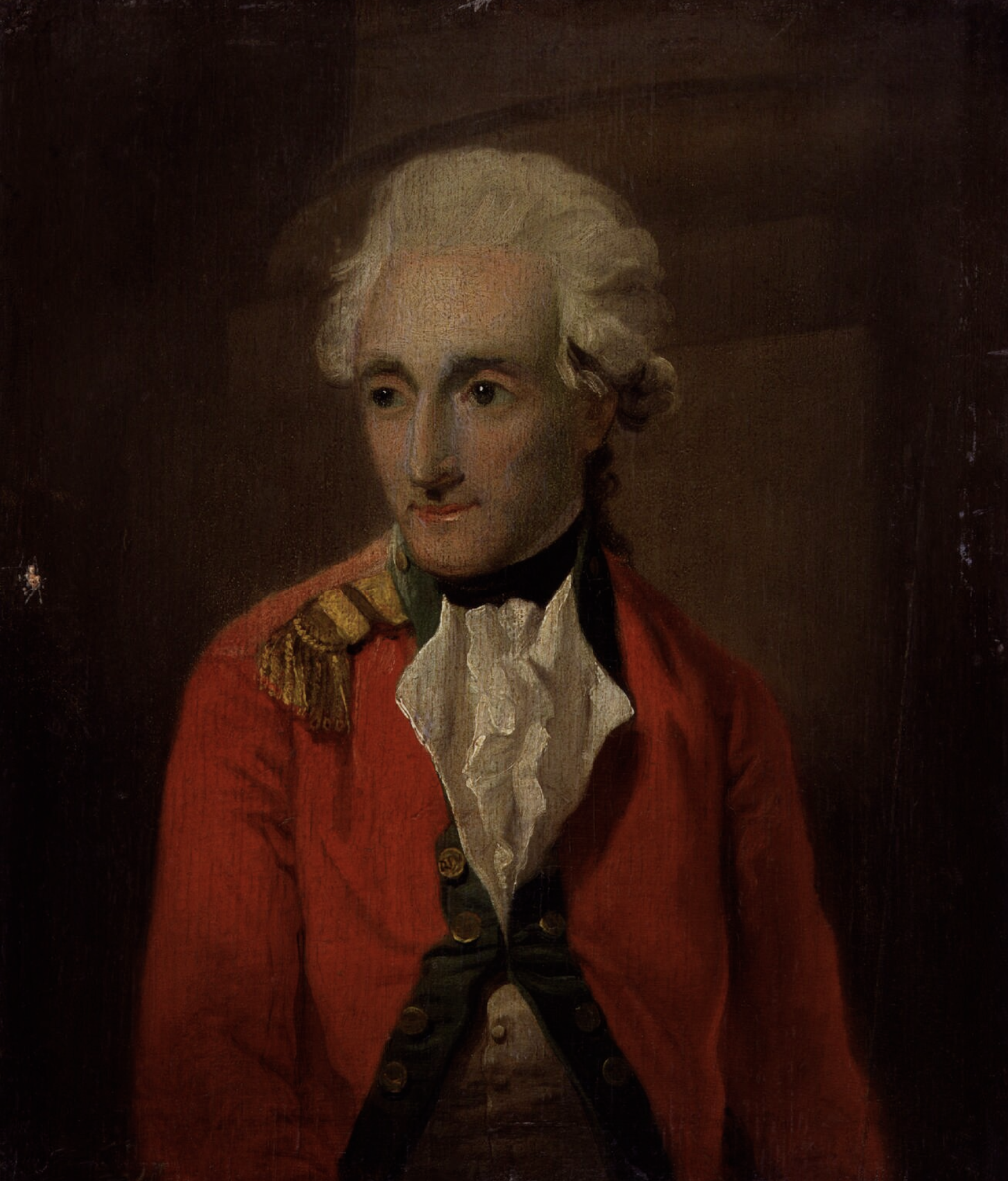
Portrait of Grattan owned by Bell

Bell died at the Royal Mews, Buckingham Palace, where he was still living, in March 1888, leaving a substantial fortune valued at £11,566 (equivalent to £1,299,757 in 2025). His unmarried sisters Louisa Georgiana and Ethel Hamilton Bell and another relation, Robert Courtenay Bell, were his executors. It was reported that he had died of pneumonia, and his friend Scharf wrote an obituary for The Athenaeum.

Doyne's executors gave his portrait of Henry Grattan by Francis Wheatley to the National Portrait Gallery, and towards the end of 1888 Bell was recorded as a donor to the Gallery.

== Publications ==
- The National Memorial to His Royal Highness the Prince Consort, with descriptive letter-press by D. C. Bell (London: John Murray, 1873)
- Notices of the Historic Persons buried in the Chapel of St. Peter ad Vincula in the Tower of London: with an Account of the Discovery of the Supposed Remains of Queen Anne Boleyn (London: John Murray, 1877; reprinted by Creative Media Partners, LLC, October 2022, ISBN 9781015404717, 398 pages)
