= Grande Odalisque =

Painting by Jean-Auguste-Dominique Ingres

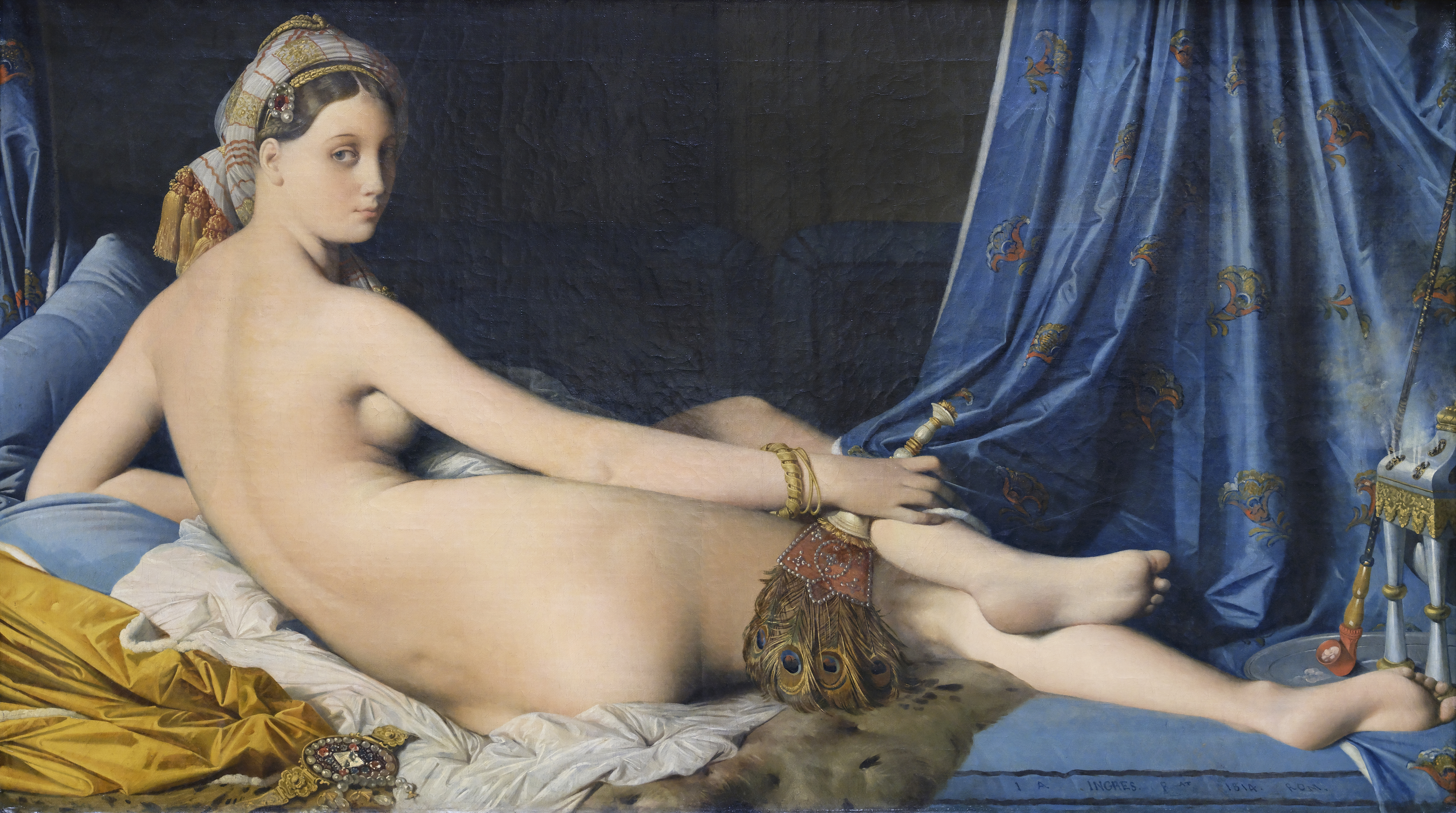
- Artist: Jean Auguste Dominique Ingres
- Year: 1814
- Medium: Oil on canvas
- Dimensions: 88.9 cm × 162.56 cm (35 in × 64 in)
- Location: Louvre, Paris

Grande Odalisque, also known as Une Odalisque or La Grande Odalisque, is an oil painting by Jean-Auguste-Dominique Ingres depicting an odalisque, or concubine, painted in 1814. Ingres' contemporaries considered the work to signify Ingres' break from Neoclassicism, indicating a shift toward exotic Romanticism.

Grande Odalisque received heavy criticism when it was first shown, and is renowned for the elongated proportions and lack of anatomical realism. The painting is currently owned by the Louvre Museum in Paris, which purchased the work in 1899.

== History ==
The painting was commissioned by Napoleon Bonaparte's sister, Queen Caroline Murat of Naples, and was finished in 1814. Ingres drew upon works such as Dresden Venus by Giorgione, and Titian's Venus of Urbino as inspiration for his reclining nude figure, though the actual pose of a reclining figure looking back over her shoulder is directly drawn from the 1800 Portrait of Madame Récamier by Jacques-Louis David.

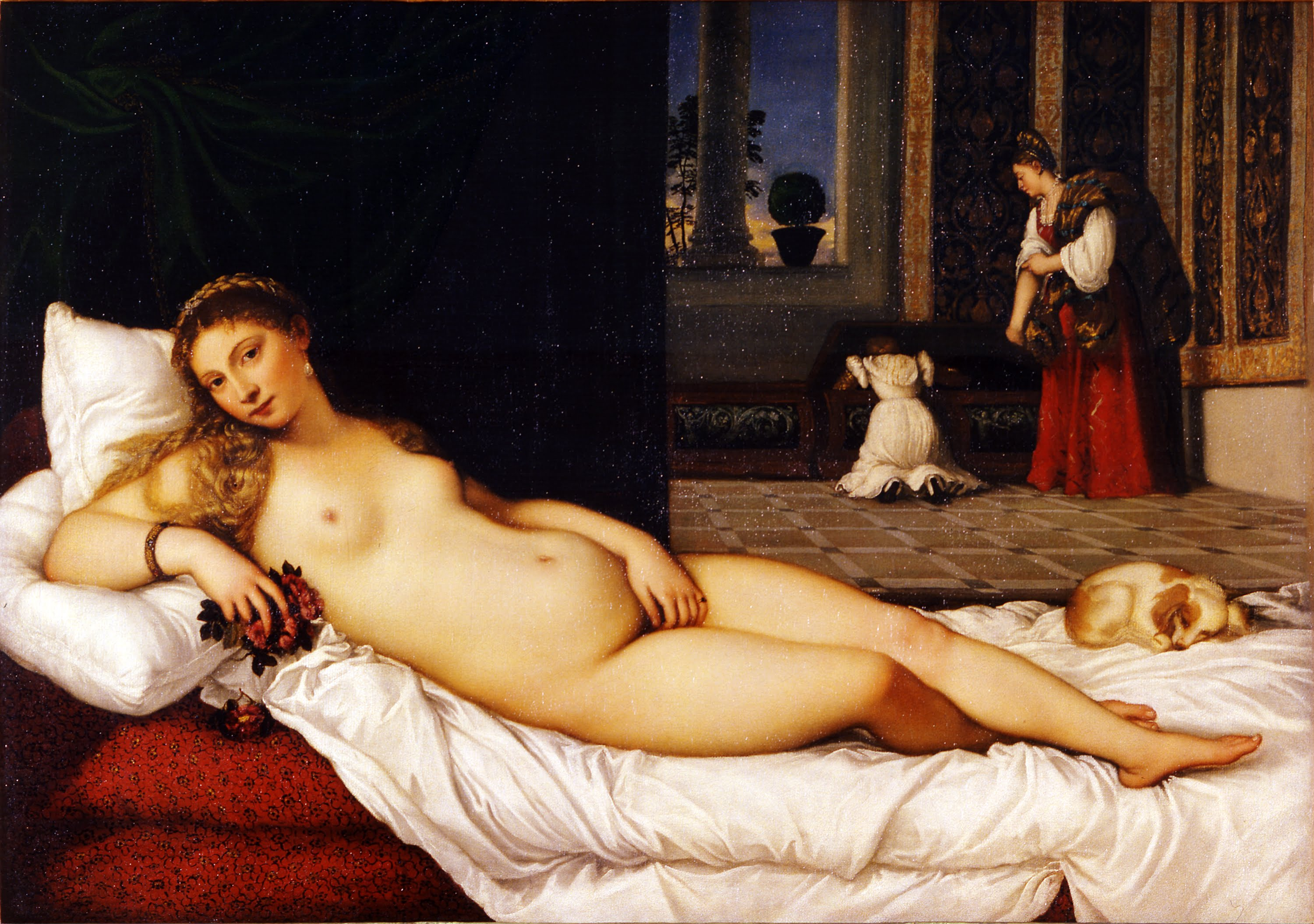
Venus of Urbino (c. 1534), Titian

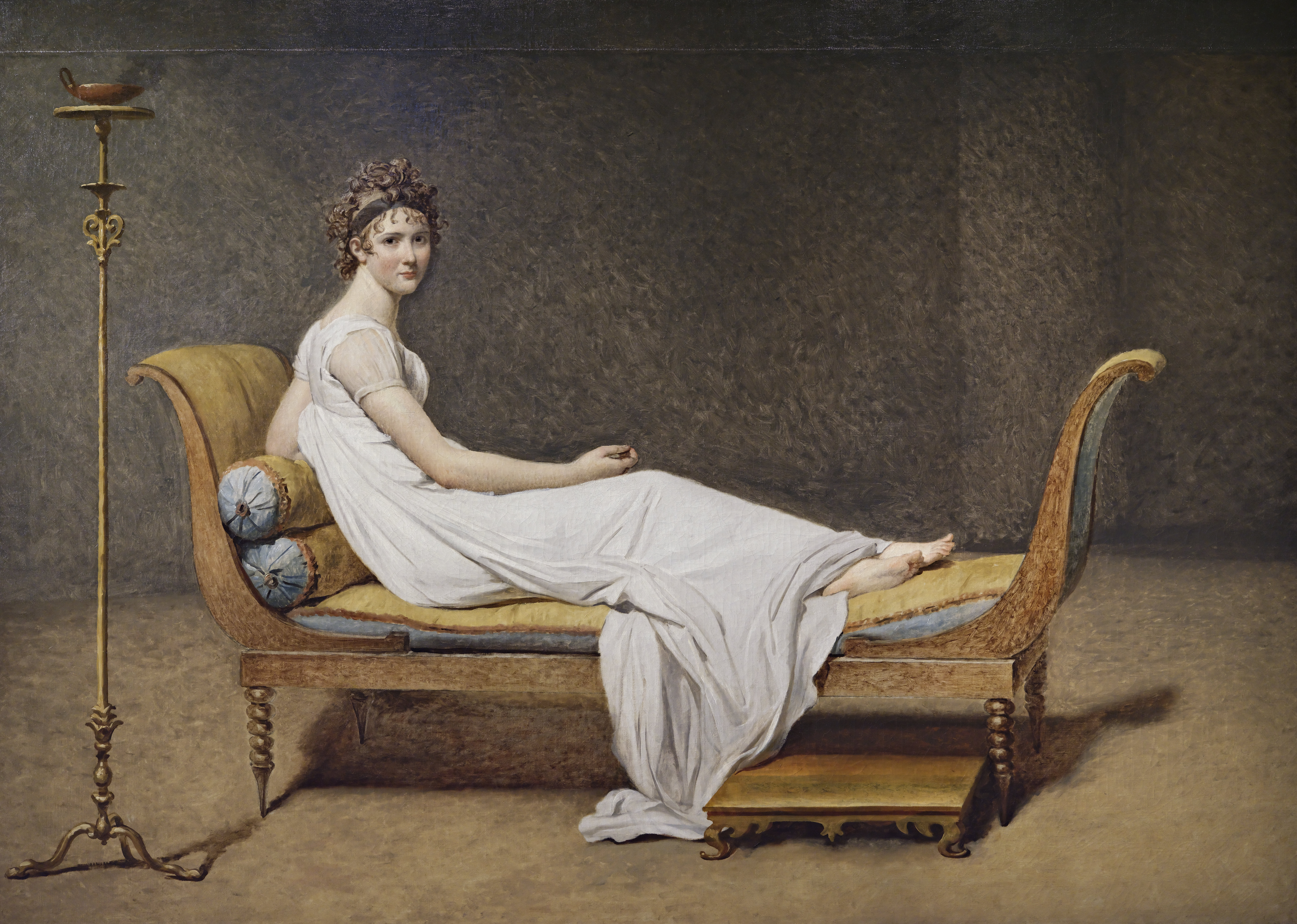
Portrait of Madame Récamier (1800), Jacques-Louis David

Ingres portrays a concubine in a languid pose as seen from behind with distorted proportions. The small head, elongated limbs, and cool color scheme all reveal influences from Mannerists such as Parmigianino, whose Madonna with the Long Neck was also famous for anatomical distortion.

This eclectic mix of styles, combining classical form with Romantic themes, prompted harsh criticism when it was first shown in 1814. Critics viewed Ingres as a rebel against the contemporary style of form and content. When the painting was first shown in the Salon of 1819, one critic remarked that the work had "neither bones nor muscle, neither blood, nor life, nor relief, indeed nothing that constitutes imitation". This echoed the general view that Ingres had disregarded anatomical realism. Ingres instead favored long lines to convey curvature and sensuality, as well as abundant, even light to tone down the volume. Ingres continued to be criticized for his work until the mid-1820s.

== Anatomy ==
Stemming from the initial criticism the painting received, the figure in Grande Odalisque is thought to be drawn with "two or three vertebrae too many." Critics at the time believed the elongations to be errors on the part of Ingres, but recent studies show the elongations to have been deliberate distortions. Measurements taken on the proportions of real women showed that Ingres's figure was drawn with a curvature of the spine and rotation of the pelvis impossible to replicate. It also showed the left arm of the odalisque is shorter than the right. The study concluded that the figure was longer by five instead of two or three vertebrae and that the excess affected the lengths of the pelvis and lower back instead of merely the lumbar region.

Another interpretation of this painting suggests that since the duty of some concubines was merely to satisfy the carnal pleasures of the sultan, this elongation of her pelvic area may have been a symbolic distortion by Ingres. While this may represent sensuous feminine beauty, her gaze, on the other hand, has been said to "[reflect] a complex psychological make-up" or "[betray] no feeling". In addition, the distance between her gaze and her pelvic region may be a physical representation of the depth of thought and complex emotions of a woman's thoughts and feelings.

== In other works ==
French painter Jules Flandrin made a copy of La Grande Odalisque in 1903 which is exhibited at the Ingres Museum in Montauban, France.

In 1964, French artist Martial Raysse, in his series Made in Japan, reframed La Grande Odalisque to make a portrait in the style of American pop art. This pastiche, through the inclusion of junk jewelry, relegates The Odalisque to the rank of a consumer product.

In 1985, Peruvian painter Herman Braun-Vega brought La Grande Odalisque into the middle of the country. In the shade of trees, she finds herself offered to the curiosity of Peruvian children. The title of this painting Pourquoi pas eux?(Why not them?) indicates that this is an advocacy for the popularization of culture ("This boy who touches the knee of Ingres's nude, touches Western culture even if he is not aware of it." Herman Braun-Vega). In 2010, he did it again with his painting La ronde au crépuscule au bord du pacifique, where La Grande Odalisque is relocated to the seaside, featuring, in addition to characters from Peruvian daily reality, nudes by Matisse and Picasso.

La Grande Odalisque was appropriated by the feminist art group Guerrilla Girls for their first color poster and most iconic image. The 1989 Metropolitan Museum poster gave Ingres's odalisque a gorilla mask and posed the question "Do women have to be naked to get into the Met. Museum?". The poster used data from the group's first "weenie count" and drew attention to the overwhelming number of female nudes counted in the Modern Art sections of The Met. The poster was rejected by the Public Art Fund in New York and was run in advertising space on New York City buses until the bus company cancelled the lease arguing that the image was "too suggestive and that the figure appeared to have more than a fan in her hand." La Grande Odalisque is also referenced in the lyrics to "Pretension/Repulsion" by Welsh alternative rock band Manic Street Preachers from their 2009 album Journal for Plague Lovers. The song's lyrics were written by the band's former lyricist Richey Edwards before his disappearance in 1995. According to the Manics' vocalist, James Dean Bradfield, the song's lyrics deal with "the idealisation of beauty, or what is ugliness".

== See also ==
- List of paintings by Jean-Auguste-Dominique Ingres
