= Cricket AM =

- Country of origin: United Kingdom

Original release
- Network: Sky Sports

Cricket AM is a Saturday-morning cricket-based television programme that was broadcast in the United Kingdom on Sky Sports 1. It began broadcasting in May 2006, and is largely based on its successful football-related counterpart Soccer AM, as a replacement during the football off-season. Each show lasted for 90 minutes and was presented by Matt Floyd, who had taken over from Simon Thomas, and Sarah-Jane Mee, the latter taking over from Anita Rani. During the English Cricket Season either an England test or game or a County Cricket game followed the programme.

The programme was last broadcast in 2013, and Sky confirmed it would not return for the 2014 season.

== Features ==
The show features a range of regular cricket-related programming features. Studio guests include past and present cricketers, and musicians with an interest in cricket. Aside from results, previews and commentary on ongoing cricket, there are a number of regular studio features on the show, including Ready Steady Freddie, a segment featuring prominent England all-rounder Andrew "Freddie" Flintoff competing against professionals in a number of different sports. Freddie has competed against Ricky Hatton at boxing, Joey Barton at football, and has played table tennis, tenpin bowling, archery, baseball, basketball and darts against world champion Phil "The Power" Taylor, with mixed success. Another regular feature has two animated characters ("Willow and "Stumpy") explaining unusual rules or jargon. 'Champagne Cork' features Hampshire's Dominic Cork looking back at the best moments of the past seven days, also there is a Stat of the Week, presented by the Sky Sport Statistician Benedict Bermange, while one of the Sky Sports commentary team is sitting behind him looking distinctly unimpressed.

The show mirrors Soccer AM very closely in many regards; The Luther Blissett Stand was renamed as the Gary Pratt cricket pavilion, (2006). It was subsequently renamed as the Dwayne Leverock (2007) and the Jesse Ryder Pavilion for the 2008 season. In 2011, it has been renamed the Douglas Jardine Pavilion. The pavilion is filled by the members of a club cricket team, who compete in a bowl-out in the outdoor car park at the end of the show. Throw Time, a feature in which county cricket teams were visited and contested to throw a ball at the stumps with their "wrong" hand, closely resembled Soccer AM's Crossbar Challenge.

In 2009, two weekly features called 'Ultimate Sportsman' and 'Brain + Brawn' were introduced. In 'Ultimate Sportsman', three county professionals all from the same team compete to become the ultimate sportsman. A penalty shootout, a golf pitching challenge and a 3 dart throw are completed, and the player with the most points after this is the winner. In 'Brain + Brawn', two players from the same team attempt to score as many points as possible. One player has to answer quiz questions, while the other must hold a 5 kg dumbbell with their arm straight and horizontal to the body. Time ends when the weight cannot be held any longer.
