= René MacColl =

English cricketer and journalist

Personal information
- Full name: René MacColl
- Born: 12 January 1905; Brentford, Middlesex, England
- Died: 20 May 1971 (aged 66); Crowborough, Sussex, England
- Batting: Unknown

Domestic team information
- Years: Team
- 1924: Oxford University

Career statistics
Competition	First-class
Matches	1
Runs scored	4
Batting average	2.00
100s/50s	–/–
Top score	4
Catches/stumpings	–/–
- Source: Cricinfo, 14 July 2020

René MacColl (12 January 1905 – 20 May 1971) was an English first-class cricketer, journalist and writer.

== Early life and education ==
MacColl was the son of the Scot Dugald Sutherland MacColl, keeper of the Tate Gallery and Wallace Collection, and his French wife Andrée Adèle Désirée Jeanne, he was born at Brentford in January 1905. He was educated at University College School, before going up to Lincoln College, Oxford. While studying at Oxford, he made a single appearance in first-class cricket for Oxford University against Lancashire at Oxford in 1924. Batting twice in the match, he was dismissed without scoring in the Oxford first innings by Cec Parkin, while in their second innings he was dismissed for 4 runs by the same bowler. MacColl spent two years at Oxford, but left without obtaining a degree, instead finding work in Belgium at Antwerp with a British firm which dealt in secondhand jute bags, but left sixteen months later when the firm was closed down.

== Early journalism and WWII ==
He soon befriended Van Lear Black, an American millionaire and publisher of The Baltimore Sun who was on holiday in London. Black hired him as his personal assistant, with MacColl accompanying him on a 200,000 mile journey across Europe, Africa and the Dutch East Indies aboard a Fokker plane that Black had hired from KLM. Upon his return to the United States in September 1927, Black offered MacColl a job at The Baltimore Sun as a district reporter, which he accepted. He spent two years reporting in Baltimore, during which time he met his wife, Helen, with whom he had two children. He returned to England in 1929 and joined The Daily Telegraph, where he reported on events both at home and abroad, including the Coronation of George VI, the wedding of Zog I of Albania and the Spanish Civil War, with MacColl being one of the first journalists to enter Madrid after its fall to Franco in March 1939.

With the beginning of hostilities with Nazi Germany imminent, he sent his family to live in Pennsylvania with his wife's mother. MacColl served in the war with the Royal Air Force Volunteer Reserve (RAFVR), being commissioned as a pilot officer in October 1939. He was initially sent to Reims to serve as a liaison officer between the Royal Air Force and was correspondents, but returned to England following the Fall of France. He was seconded from the RAFVR in November 1940 and was dispatched to New York as the first head of press and radio at the British Information Services, remaining there beyond the conclusion of the war. In 1945, his wife died in the United States.

== Post-war career and life ==
In February 1946, MacColl joined the Daily Express and in the same year he married his second wife, Hermione Bruce. He was Washington correspondent for the Daily Express from 1946–48, reporting on the trial of Alger Hiss and the 1948 United States presidential election. He became Paris correspondent in 1949, before returning to the United States in 1951 for a second spell as Washington correspondent, covering the 1952 United States presidential election. He was based in London from 1953–58, but spent at least six months a year reporting from aboard. He accompanied Clement Attlee on his 1954 visit to China and was the first western journalist to visit the Soviet Union in several years. From 1959, he spent ten years as the chief foreign correspondent at the Express, interviewing Cold War leaders such as Josip Broz Tito.

In addition to his journalism, MacColl also published several books. Among his best known publications was Roger Casement: a New Judgement. He also wrote two autobiographies and penned books on travel. MacColl died in hospital at Crowborough in May 1971.
