= Sarah-Jane Mee =

British television presenter (born 1978)

- Born: Sarah-Jane Mee; 10 July 1978 (age 48); Birmingham, England, UK
- Education: University of Manchester
- Occupations: Newsreader, TV presenter
- Employer: Sky News
- Notable credit(s): Pulling Power; Central Tonight; Sky News Sunrise; The Sarah-Jane Mee Show; The UK Tonight with Sarah-Jane Mee
- Spouse: Ben Richardson (m. 2022)
- Children: 1
- Website: www.sarahjanemeeofficial.com

Sarah-Jane Mee (born 10 July 1978) is a Sky News presenter and the anchor of The Sarah-Jane Mee Show. From October 2016 until October 2019, Mee anchored Sunrise.

== Career ==
After graduating from the University of Manchester, Mee joined Sky Sports as a runner, then moved to the planning desk before becoming a producer.

In October 2002, she joined ITV Central to present the sport on Central News West, and latterly the main news programme. She also anchored the pan-regional programme, Soccer Monday. She then became the face of sport for ITV in the Midlands. As well as presenting on the six o'clock news programme Central Tonight most evenings as Main and Sports Presenter, she was the main presenter of ITV Central's weekly Central Soccer Night show. She co-hosted the ITV Central and London football programme Hancock's Half-Time, along with Nick Hancock (which replaced Central Soccer Night).

The show was later given its original name of Central Soccer Night after Hancock departed, and Mee hosted the show into 2007, along with former Nottingham Forest, Aston Villa, Liverpool and Leicester striker Stan Collymore. She also co-presented the last series of ITV's Pulling Power with Mike Brewer and Edd China.

Her radio career began in 2006, when she stood in for Hellon Wheels on the Ed James Breakfast Show on 100.7 Heart FM, whilst Hellon had her first baby. After a successful three-month stint on the show over the Summer of 2006, she rejoined the show as a regular host in January 2007.

In January 2008, it was announced that she would leave both Central Television and Heart FM to rejoin Sky Sports. She left Central in January, and presented her last show for Heart in March. Mee became a part of Sky Sports' UEFA Champions League team on Wednesday evenings, alongside Richard Keys. Since May 2009, Mee has co-presented Cricket AM on Sky Sports. In August 2013, she started presenting a new weekly show on Sky Sports called What's The Story?

In June 2014 Mee cycled the 190 km leg of the upcoming Tour de France, from Leeds to Harrogate for the Sky Sports show Riding The Dales.

From October 2019 Mee presented The Sarah-Jane Mee Show on Sky News, Monday to Thursday 2 pm – 5 pm. In September 2022 she mistook a march at Trafalgar Square protesting the shooting of Chris Kaba for a gathering of people marking the death of the Queen; Sky News later issued an apology regarding this.

Mee presented the final episode of The Sarah-Jane Mee Show on 31 August 2023.

On 2 October 2023, Mee's primetime evening show The UK Tonight with Sarah-Jane Mee premiered on Sky News.

== Personal life ==
She married Ben Richardson, the chief executive of a branding agency, in 2022. They have a daughter born in June 2020. Mee is stepmother to Ben's son from a previous relationship.
