= Dugald Sutherland MacColl =

Scottish watercolour painter (1859-1948)

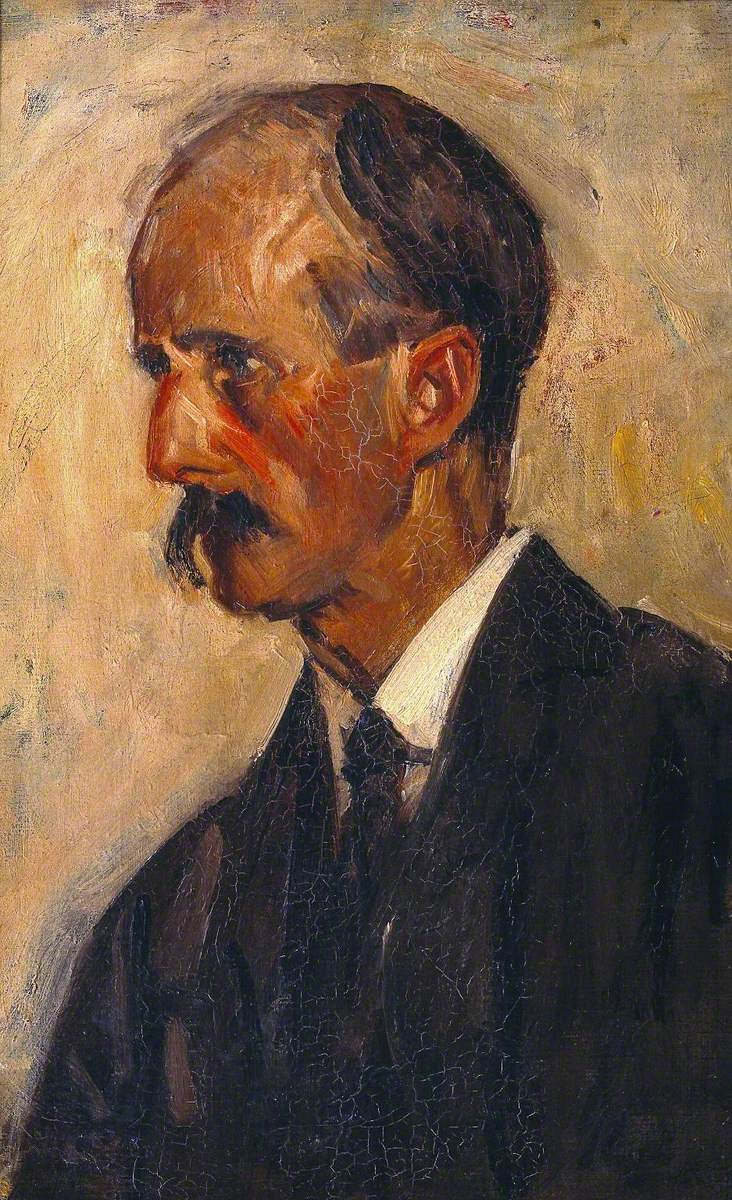
MacColl in 1906.

Dugald Sutherland MacColl (10 March 1859 – 21 December 1948) was a Scottish watercolour painter, art critic, lecturer and writer. He was keeper of the Tate Gallery for five years.

== Life ==
MacColl was born in Glasgow and educated at the University of London and the University of Oxford between 1876 and 1884. He also studied at the Westminster School of Art and the Slade School under Alphonse Legros between 1884 and 1892. Although an accomplished watercolourist, he is best remembered as a writer and lecturer on art. From 1890 to 1895 he was art critic for The Spectator, and for the Saturday Review from 1896 to 1906. MacColl became a member of the New English Art Club in 1896, and edited the Architectural Review from 1901 to 1905.

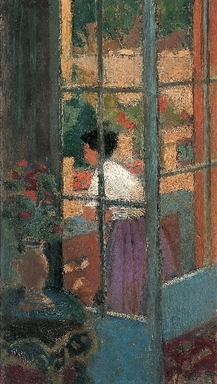
On the Terrace, 1922.

He published the authoritative book, Nineteenth Century Art, in 1902 and his biography Philip Wilson Steer was awarded the 1945 James Tait Black Memorial Prize. In his journalism and books he was a major advocate of the French Impressionists, and was influential in spreading their ideas and shaping public attitudes in Britain towards favouring Impressionism. From 1906 to 1911 he was keeper of the Tate Gallery and, after the retirement of Sir Claude Phillips, the Wallace Collection from 1911 to 1924.

Dugald Sutherland MacColl died in 1948 in London. A Memorial Exhibition of his work was held at the Tate Gallery in 1950. His son was René MacColl, a cricketer and journalist.

== Campaigns ==
During his career, MacColl campaigned for a number of artistically controversial causes.

In 1903, in the Saturday Review, he argued that the administrators of the estate of Sir Francis Chantrey, who had left the Chantrey Bequest to the Royal Academy to fund the purchase of artworks for the nation, were departing from the terms and buying mediocre works. After his subsequent book in 1904, Administration of the Chantrey Bequest, a government committee initiated reforms. He also campaigned for the government to spend more on art, resulting in the founding in 1903 of the National Art-Collections Fund.

In the 1920s he campaigned, unsuccessfully, for the preservation of John Rennie's Waterloo Bridge. Herbert Morrison and London County Council were eventually successful in their advocacy for its demolition and replacement.

Other causes included his opposition, as a member of the Royal Fine Art Commission, to the 1925 proposal to build a sacristy under the north wall of Westminster Abbey. He was also a central figure in discussions of "Gothic" additions to Oxford colleges, and in efforts to preserve the Foundling Hospital.

== Selected publications ==
- A note on Vermeer of Delft and the picture Christ with Martha & Mary. 1901.
- Nineteenth century art. 1902.
- Catalogue, Turner collection. 1920.
- Wallace collection catalogues: Pictures and drawings, with historical notes, short lives of the painters, and 380 illustrations (14 ed.). 1920.
- Confessions of a keeper, and other papers. 1931.
- What is art? and other papers. 1940.
- Life, work and setting of Philip Wilson Steer. 1945.

== Notes ==
Cultural offices
Preceded by Charles Holroyd	Director of the Tate Gallery; 1906–1911	Succeeded by Charles Aitken
