= Peter Quilliam (pharmacologist) =

British pharmacologist

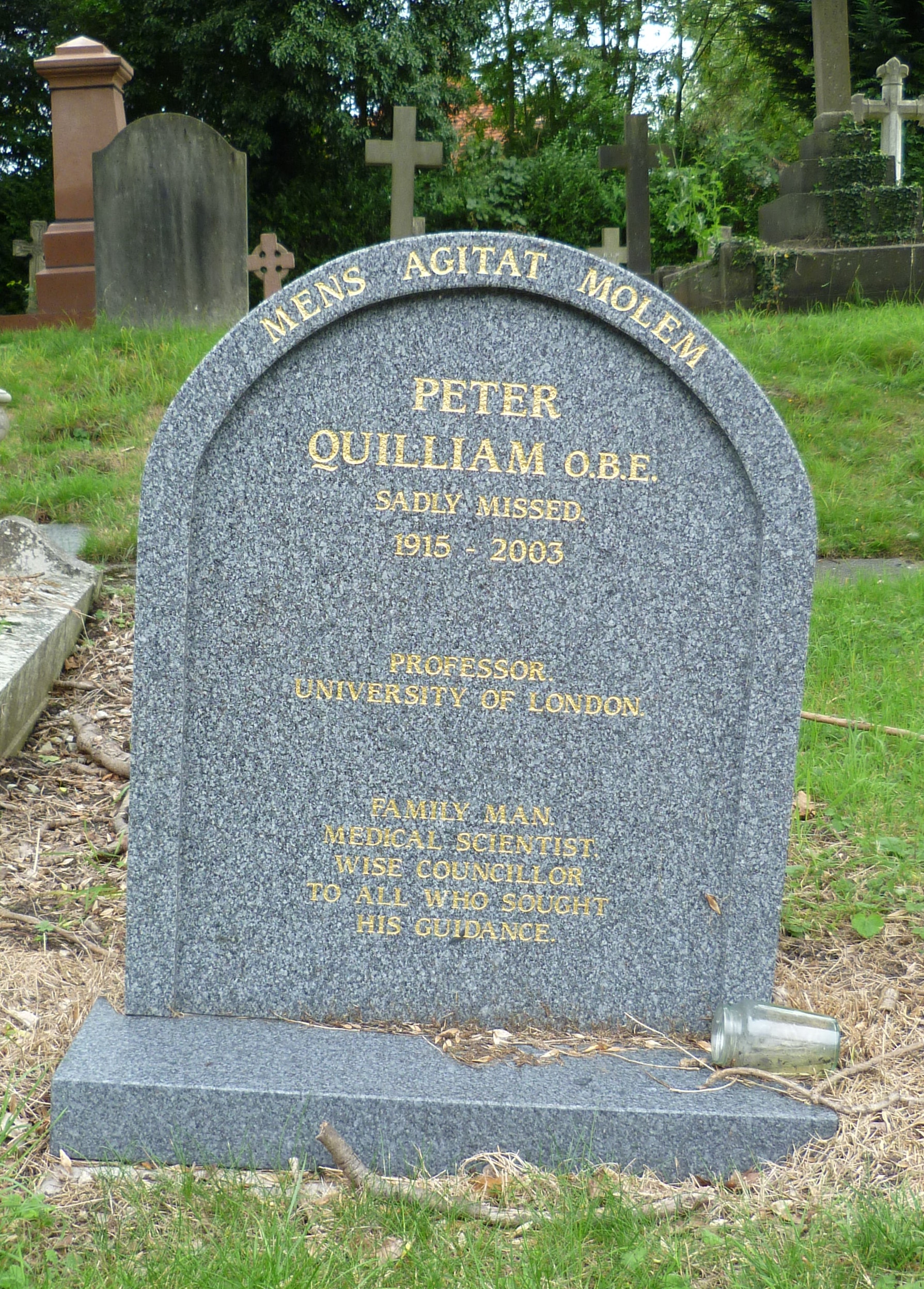
Peter Quilliam's grave at St Andrew's church, Totteridge.

Juan Peter Quilliam OBE (20 November 1915 - 11 September 2003) was emeritus professor of pharmacology at the University of London.

== Biography ==
Juan Pete Quilliam (Peter) was born in Richmond on 20 November 1915, to Thomas Alfred and Caroline Maud (née Pavitt), both school teachers. He attended University College School and began studying at University College Hospital on a scholarship when he was 16. He obtained his MSc at University College London, and obtained an MSc. He qualified as a doctor in 1941 with honours and distinctions in forensic medicine and hygiene.

In 1943 Quilliam joined the Royal Air Force Volunteer Reserve. He was involved in researching several innovations of value to airmen.

After the war, he was a lecturer at King’s College and served a fellowship to the Johns Hopkins School of Medicine in Baltimore. The Quilliams sailed back to the UK on the Queen Elizabeth, arriving in Southampton on 3 January 1950 en route to their home at 3 Kenver Avenue, London N12.

== Personal life ==
Peter Quilliam married Kathleen Florence Melita Kelly (Melita) at St Nun’s, Pelynt on 21 December 1946. They had two children: Penelope Sally Anne (Penny) in 1950 and Jonathon Peter in 1953, both born in Marylebone. Melita was killed in a traffic accident in 1957. She died on 13 November in Barnett General Hospital.

Quilliam’s second wife was Barbara Lucy Marion Kelly. They were married in 1958. She died in Rochford in 2022, far outliving Peter, who died on 11 September 2003. He was buried at St Andrew's church, Totteridge, London. Barbara requested in her will that she should have "a Green Burial at the Wild Flower Cemetery, Ashingdon or at a place of my children's choosing".

== Awards and honours ==
- 1936 BSc
- 1938 MSc
- 1941 MB BS
- 1941 MRCS LRCP
- 1969 DSc
- 1971 MRCP
- 1975 FRCP
- 1986 OBE
