= Jean-Barthélemy Le Couteulx de Canteleu =

French politician and banker

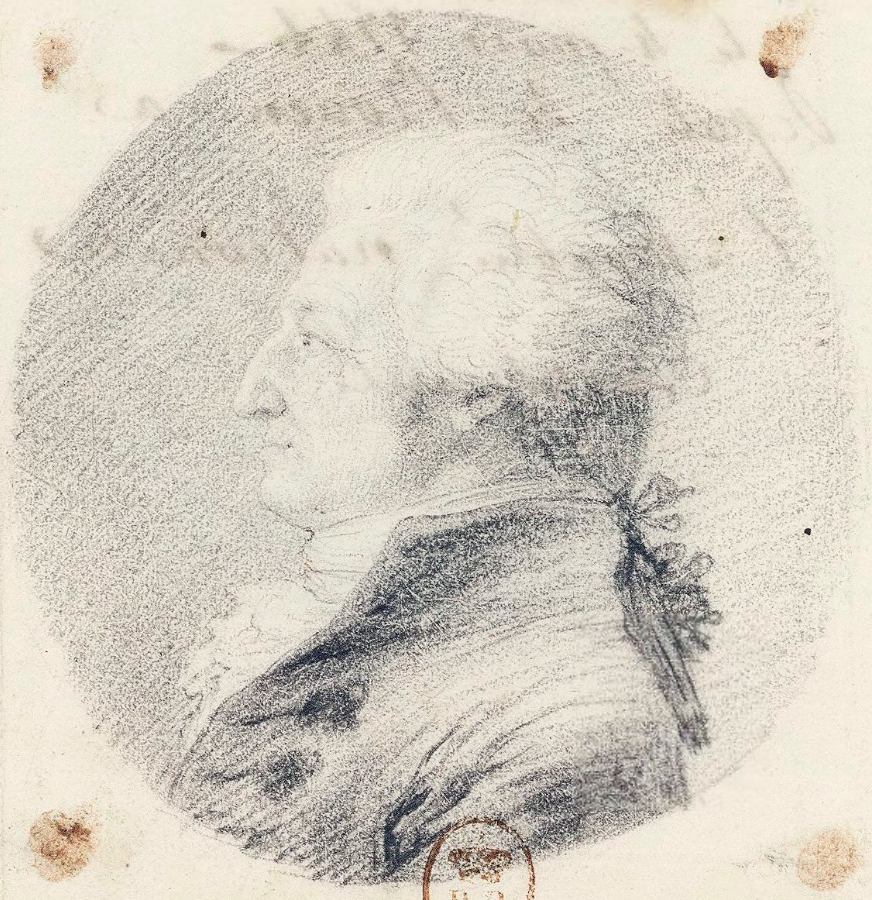

Jean-Barthélemy Le Couteulx, comte de Canteleu et de Fresnelles, seigneur de Yonville (4 March 1749 – 18 September 1818) was a French politician and banker, notable as one of the founders of the Banque de France.

== Life ==
Usually thought to have been born in Rouen, some biographies place his birth or death instead at the au château de Farceaux (Eure) or his birth at Canteleu. Son of Thomas-Barthélemy Le Couteulx, Premier Président of the Chambre des comptes de Normandie, Jean-Barthélemy initially became a banker in Rouen and then first 'échevin' to the 1789 convocation of the Estates General. On 21 April 1789 he was elected third estate deputy to the Estates General for Rouen. Particularly interested in financial matters, he supported Jacques Necker's plans and rapporteur for the law on the sale of 400 million francs of clergy lands.

In 1790 he refused the post of caissier général of the Extraordinaire and proposed a ban on deputies occupying an executive post. Under the Reign of Terror he was imprisoned from 3 December 1793 to 13 August 1794 before resuming his post as deputy. Initially retiring from political life at the end of the session and setting up offices on place Vendôme, on 20 October 1793 he was elected by 237 out of 685 votes deputy for Seine to the Conseil des Anciens, sitting with the moderates. As at the first assembly, he produced several reports on financial matters, contributed to the adoption of the resolutions on payment of state goods and had the resolution banning British goods adopted. After the Coup of 18 Fructidor he bravely opposed the proscription of his Girondin colleagues, declaring that he had seen nothing in the evidence presented against them which could justify such a rigorous measure. He eloquently argued for those deported and their families before becoming secretary and president of the assembly.

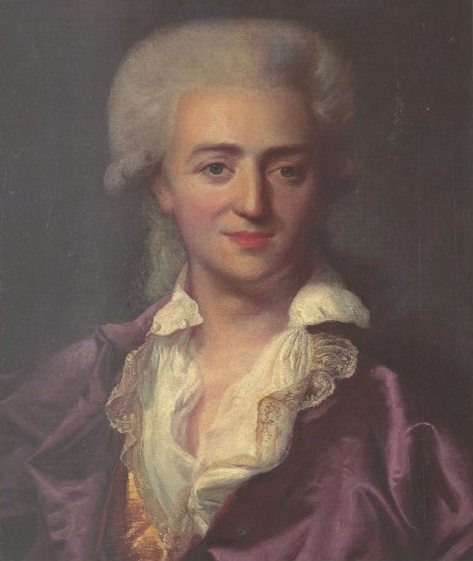
Portrait of Le Couteulx.

At the end of 1798 he published an Essay on the taxes proposed in France, for year seven, on those which currently exist in England, and on public credit. Camille Saint-Aubin served as his secretary. He left the Conseil in floréal Year VII (1798–1799), becoming president of the départemental administration for the Seine. Backing the 18 Brumaire coup, he was made a member of the Sénat conservateur on 24 December 1799. He became regent of the Banque de France, which he, Jean-Frédéric Perregaux, Mallet aîné, Récamier and the tobacco trader Jacques-Florent Robillard had founded on 13 February 1799. He occupied the second chair of the Conseil de régence and retired in 1804. He also joined the 'Négociants réunis', entrusted with finding funds for the treasury.

He was made a chevalier of the Légion d'honneur on 2 October 1803 and commander of the same order the following 14 June, before being also made a comte d’Empire on 26 April 1808 and granted the sénatorerie of Lyon. Just before his fall Napoleon sent his most trusted friends as commissioners to the departments to try to rouse them in his favour – Le Couteulx was the one sent to Tours but had little success. In 1814 he was made extraordinary commissioner to the 22nd military division. On the Bourbon Restoration he was summoned to sit in the Chamber of Peers, voting consistently for the opposition. He stayed away from political life during the Hundred Days and after them retook his seat as a peer under the Second Restoration. At first sitting with the ultra-royalists, he voted for death in Michel Ney's trial, but later moved to join the moderates. A portrait of him hangs in the Bibliothèque de Rouen.

== Marriage and issue ==
In 1775 he married his relation Anne Le Couteulx de Verclives, daughter of Antoine Le Couteulx de Verclives (mayor of Rouen) and Marie Françoise Louise Rolland. In 1784 he remarried to Catherine Alexandrine Charlotte Formont de Cléronde, cousin of Guillaume Louis Darthenay.

His children included colonel Charles Emmanuel Le Couteulx de Canteleu, aide de camp to the duc d'Angoulême and commander of the Légion d'honneur (himself father of Jean-Emmanuel Le Couteulx de Canteleu) and Barthélémy-Alphonse Le Couteulx de Canteleu.

== Works ==
Le Couteulx de Canteleu wrote several political brochures and reports, including Réfutation de la lettre de Dupont de Nemours, adressée à la chambre de commerce de Normandie, 1788, in-8°; Rapport des commissaires nommés pour l’examen d’un projet de banque, etc., Paris, 1789, in-8°; Opinion sur l’émission de deux milliards d’assignats pour le remboursement de la dette exigible, Paris, 1790, in-8°; Rapport du comité des finances sur l’échange des assignats contre les billets de la Caisse d'Escompte, etc. , Paris, 1790; Essai sur les contributions proposées en France pour l’an VII, Paris, 1798 and 1816. He also edited De Malmontet's Essai sur la littérature espagnole, 1810, in-8°.

- Réfutation de la lettre de Dupont de Nemours, adressée à la chambre de commerce de Normandie, 1788, in-8°
- Rapport des commissaires nommés pour l’examen d’un projet de banque, etc., Paris, 1789, in-8°
- Opinion sur l’émission de deux milliards d’assignats pour le remboursement de la dette exigible, Paris, 1790, in-8°
- Rapport du comité des finances sur l’échange des assignats contre les billets de la caisse d’escompte, etc. , Paris, 1790
- Essai sur les contributions proposées en France pour l’an VII, Paris, 1798 et 1816
