= Aimée Eugénie Delville-Cordier =

French painter (1822–1899)

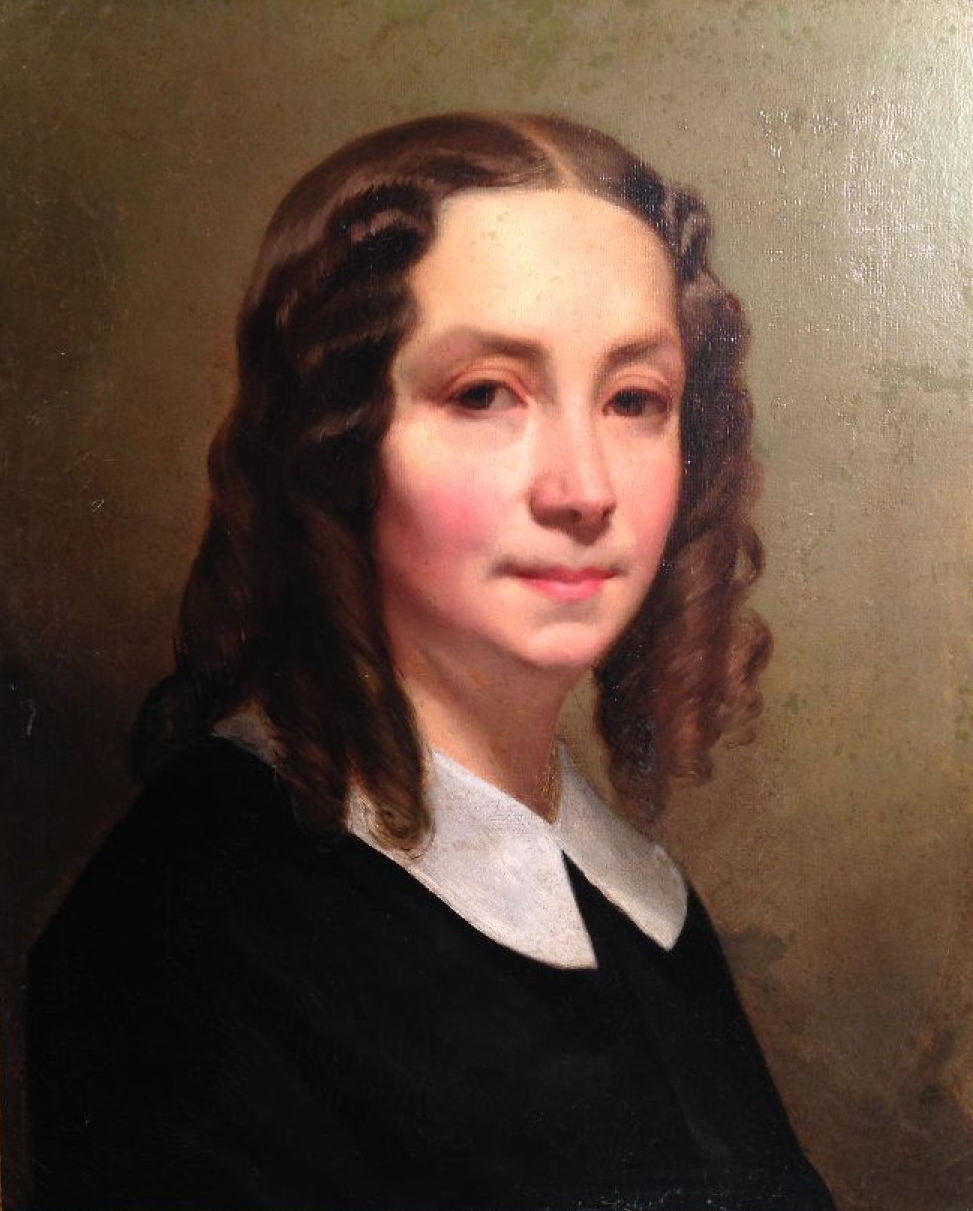
- Delville-Cordier self-portrait, 1856
- Born: Aimée Eugénie Delaville; 10 April 1822
- Died: 2 February 1899 (aged 76); 19 quai Saint-Michel, Paris, France
- Organizations: Société des artistes peintres; Société des artistes français; Société des Beaux-Arts
- Parents: François-Simon Cordier (father); Marie Madeleine Delville (mother)
- Known for: Miniatures of Old Masters
- Notable work: Nature morte au chou (1868); Miniature, after a fresco by Raphael at the Vatican (1869); Portrait, miniature — Exposition Universelle (1878)
- Style: Portrait miniatures

Aimée Eugénie Delville-Cordier (1822–1899) was a French painter specialising in portrait miniatures and also known to produce miniature copies of the Old Masters.

== Life ==
Delville-Cordier was born on 10 April 1822 to Marie Madeleine Delville. Independently wealthy, she was the adoptive daughter of the physician and botanist François-Simon Cordier. Her situation allowed her to pursue a professional career in art, although no catalogue records document her formal artistic education.

Delville-Cordier spent her career resident in the 6th arrondissement of Paris near the Seine. In the late 1850s, she moved from her father's home on rue de Saint-Germain to a Restauration-era apartment building overlooking Notre-Dame where she remained for the rest of her life. The address is associated with a number of other artists including Henri Matisse.

Delville-Cordier was a member of Taylor's Société des artistes peintres, the Société des artistes français, and the Société des Beaux-Arts. She exhibited regularly at the Paris Salon between 1853 and 1882, and from 1860 she also showed in London at the Royal Academy. Her work was also shown at the 1855 and 1878 Expositions universelles.

Delville-Cordier died on 2 February 1899 at her home at 19 quai Saint-Michel. In her will, she left money to a number of charitable and religious institutions, including the Orphelinat des Arts (Orphanage of the Arts), the Asile de nuit des femmes (Night Shelter for Women), and the Union des femmes de France (French Women's Union). She also made significant bequests to the professional art organisations of which she was a member.

== Work ==
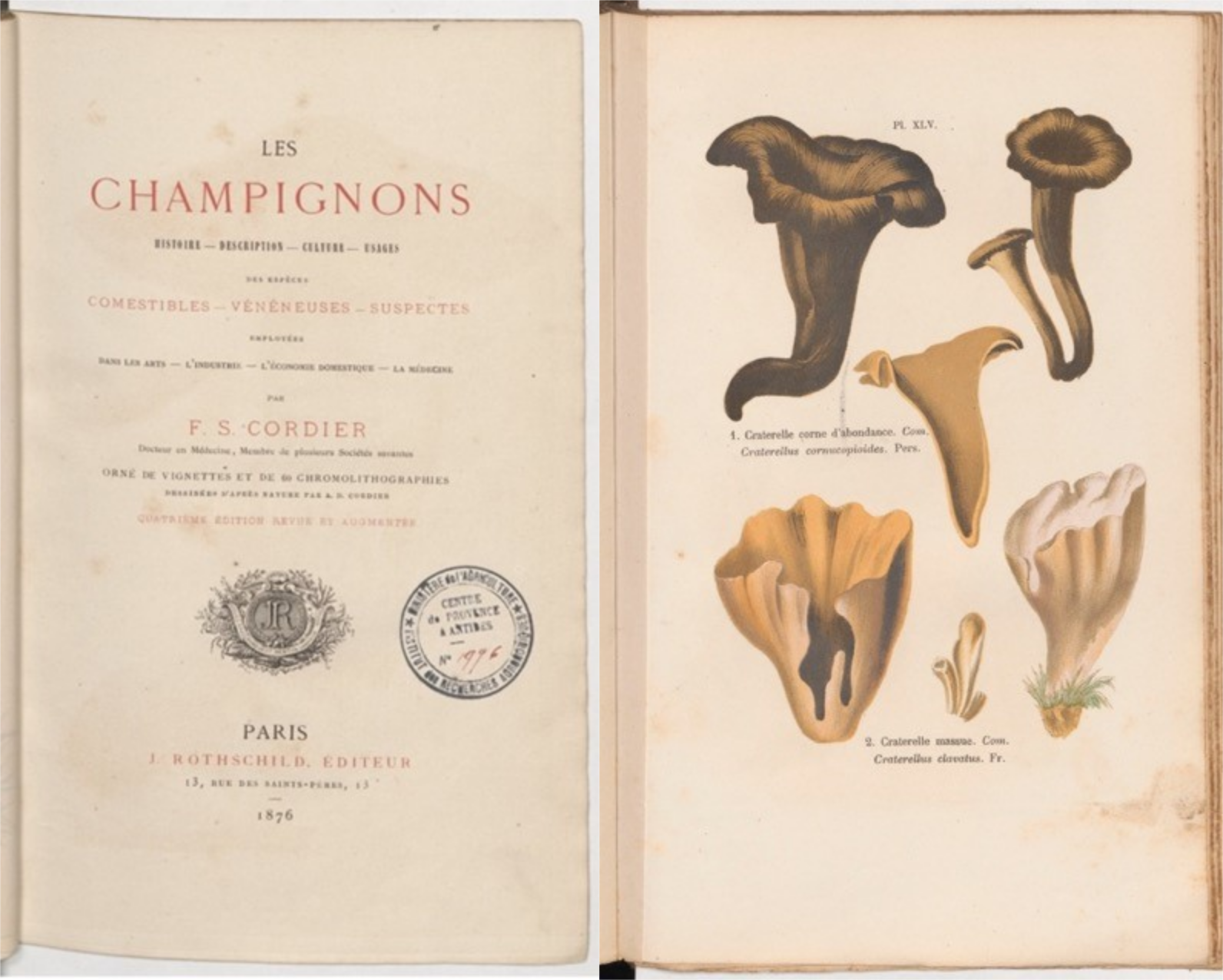
François Simon Cordier's Les Champignon de France (1876), illustrated by Delville-Cordier

Delville-Cordier produced both portraiture and still-life paintings, many of which are held in the Musée Barrois in Bar-le-Duc. Her portrait subjects include a large number of notable military figures such as General René de Ligniville, General Joseph Hédouville de Mirecourt, and General Baron Jean-Baptiste Antoine La Planche.

In addition to portraiture, Delville-Cordier painted still lifes, including works titled Still Life with Cabbage / Nature morte au chou and Still Life with Cheese / Nature morte au fromage (both 1868). Her miniaturist reproductions of the Old Masters include an 1870 copy of the fresco by Raphael at the Vatican.

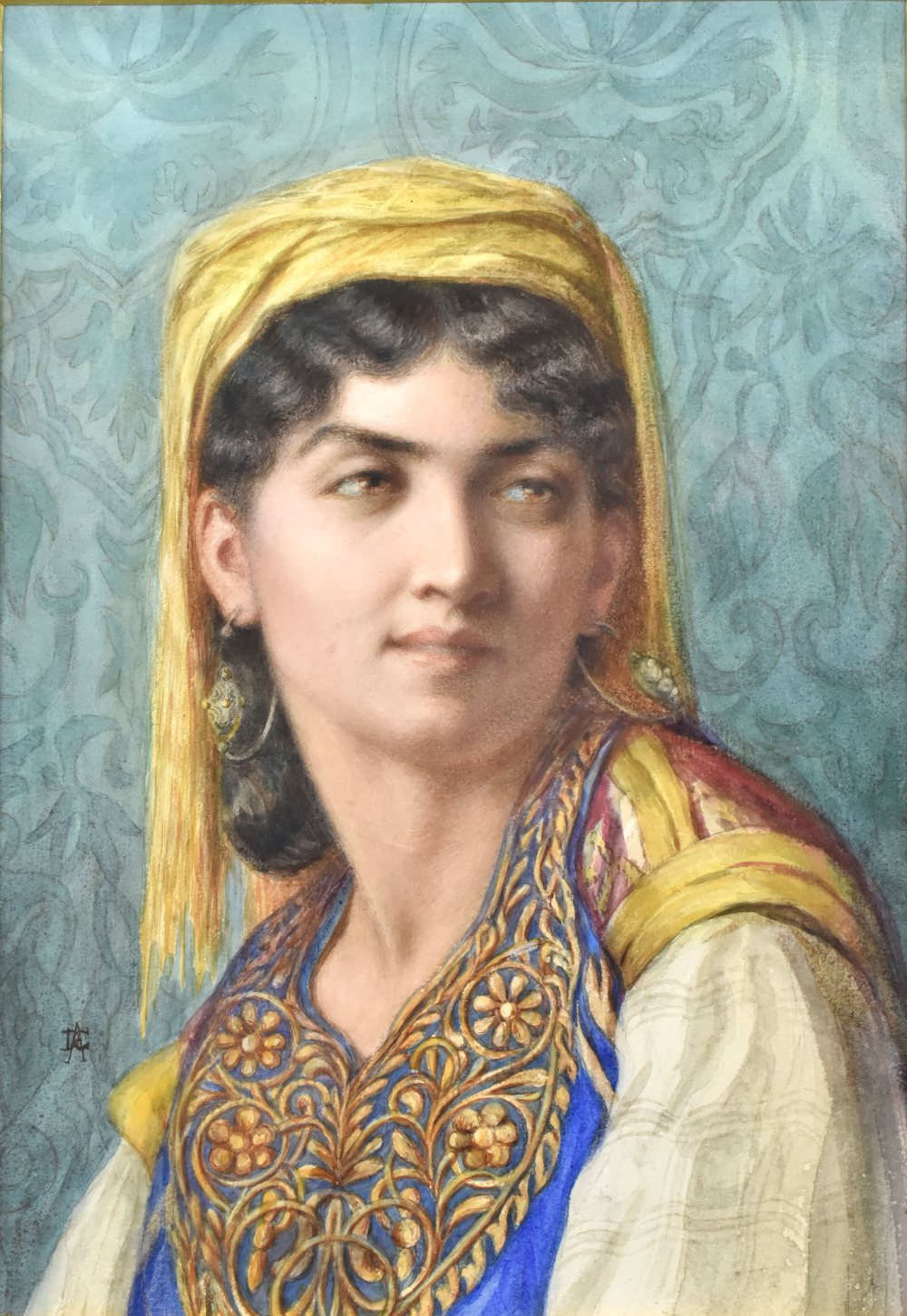
Watercolor portrait of a Moroccan woman wearing a headdress and floral dress.

Delville-Cordier also contributed to her father François‑Simon Cordier's work on mycology, Les Champignons de la France (The Mushrooms of France). The book, which provides detailed descriptions of edible, poisonous, and “suspect” mushrooms as well as their uses in medicine, the arts, and domestic economy, was illustrated with sixty chromolithographs drawn from nature.

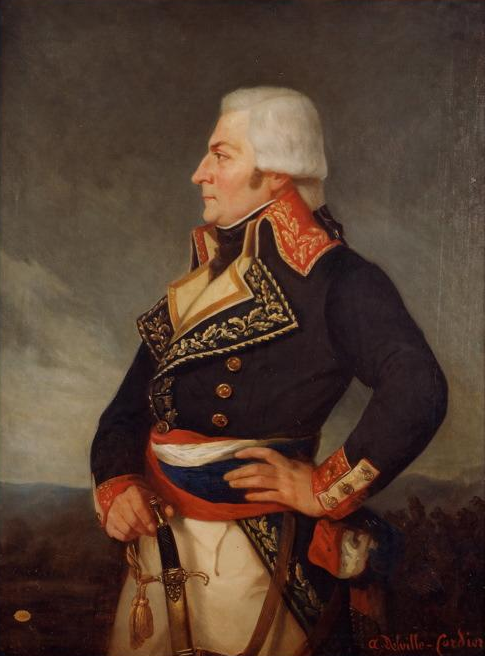
Portrait of General René de Ligniville.

A list of works she exhibited at the Salon demonstrates her focus on miniature painting.

- Portrait, miniature (1869)
- Miniature, after a fresco by Raphael at the Vatican (1869)
- Two portraits, miniatures (1870)
- Victoria, miniature (1872)
- Pasquia, miniature (1872)
- Portrait, miniature (1873)
- Giovanina, miniature (1873)
- Portrait, miniature (1874)
- Lucia, miniature (1874)
- Joueuse de mandoline, miniature (1876)
- Jeune Moresque d'Alger, miniature (1876)
- Femme juive d'Alger, miniature (1877)
- Portrait, miniature (1877)
- Portraits miniatures (1878)
- Portrait, miniature — Exposition Universelle, 1878
- Portrait, miniature (1879)
- Zorah, miniature (1880)
- Three portraits, miniatures (1880)
- Six portraits, miniatures (1881)
