= Cité de l'économie et de la monnaie =

City of Economy and Currency
- Cité de l'économie et de la monnaie (Citéco)

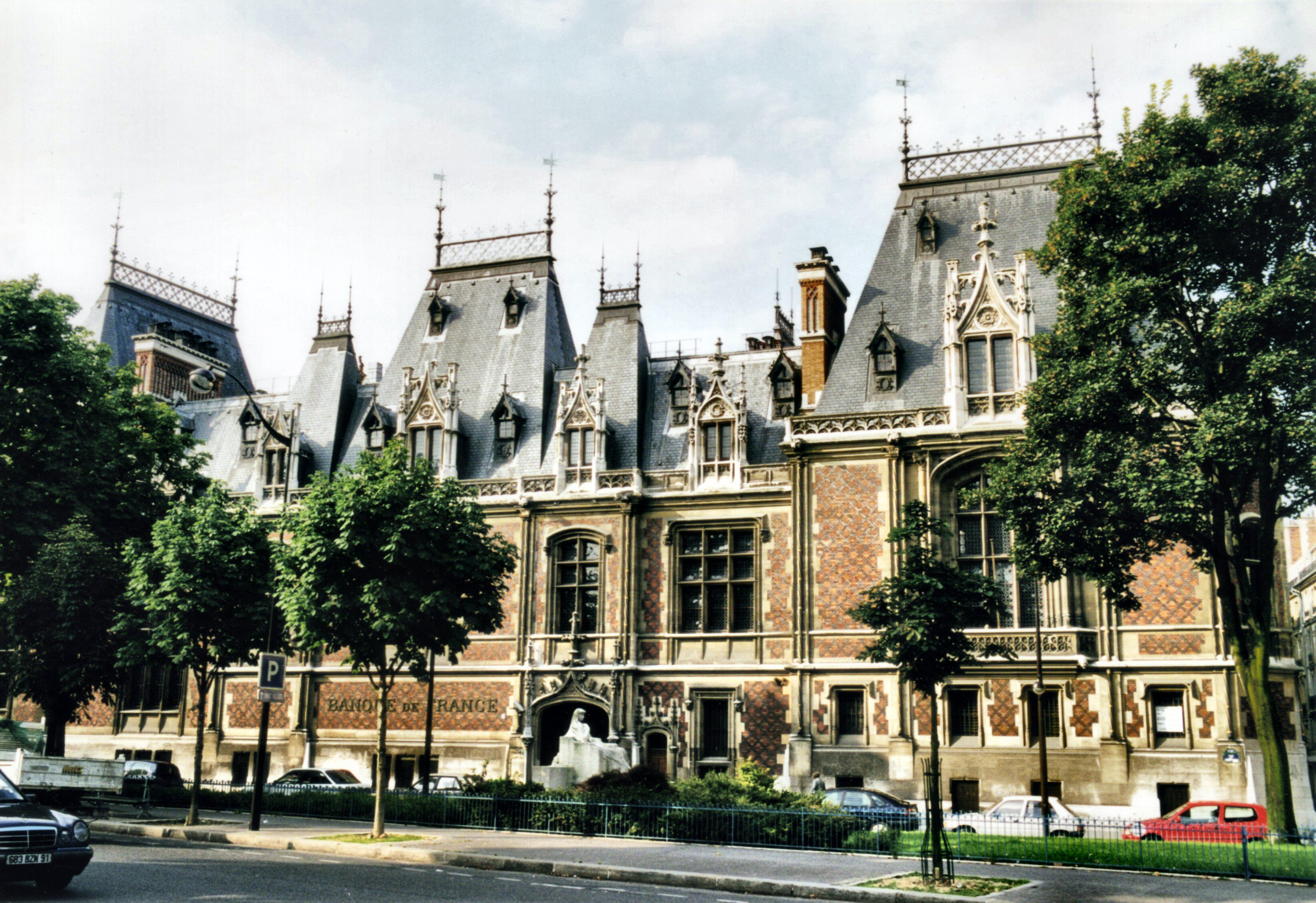
- The Hotel Gaillard, future site of the Cité de l'économie et de la monnaie

- Location within Paris
- Established: late 2014
- Location: Paris
- Coordinates: 48.8821848°N 2.3103401°E
- Type: museum
- Public transit access: Malesherbes
- Website: https://www.citeco.fr/en

The Cité de l'économie et de la monnaie (French pronunciation: [site də lekɔnɔmi e də la mɔnɛ]) or Citéco ([siteko]) is a museum dedicated to the economy, located in Paris, France. It was inaugurated on 15 May 2019, and opened to the public on 14 June 2019. The museum was financed with patronage from the Bank of France, and is located in the Hotel Gaillard.

== History ==
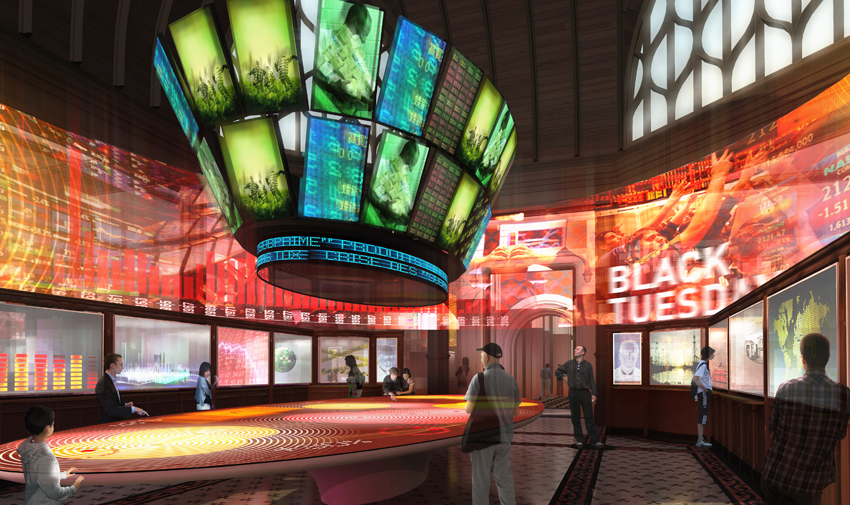
Grand Lobby of the future Cité de l'économie et de la monnaie, architectural and museographic contest, 2011

The Bank of France announced the creation of the Cité de l'économie et de la monnaie during a press conference held by Governor Christian Noyer on May 25, 2011. The museum was proposed as an educational facility, inviting the general public to discover economics, tackle issues often met in everyday life, and encourage a better understanding of world events.

The Cité de l'économie et de la monnaie mainly addresses teachers and students, to help illustrate concepts studied at school (around one-third of the estimated 130,000 annual visitors are expected to be students).

== Partners ==
The project is led by the Bank of France, in collaboration with several partners. Among these are:

- The Ministry of National Education (France) supports the project and has delegated several teachers to help on the content of the Cité de l'économie et de la monnaie.
- Existing museums of other Central Banks, like those of the European Union or the Interactive Museum of Economics (MIDE), in Mexico.
- Universcience, and especially the Cité des Sciences et de l'Industrie: Christian Noyer, Governor of the Bank of France, and Claudie Haigneré, head of Universcience, have signed a cooperation agreement on the museography.
- The Institut pour l'Education Financière du Public joined in late 2010.
- The Bibliothèque nationale de France: Governor Christian Noyer and President of the Bibliothèque nationale de France Bruno Racine signed a cooperation agreement on January 3, 2012, regarding the presentation of coin and banknote collections in the future Cité de l'économie et de la monnaie.
- The Rencontres des SES: initiative developed by the Académie de Paris, where 11th grade students studying Economics and Social Sciences are invited to meet economists, in order to discuss current issues.
- The Little Conferences of the Nouveau Théâtre de Montreuil announced a partnership on February 11, 2012. The partnership is developed around their shared objective of increasing young people's access to knowledge.

== Building ==
Citéco is hosted in the Hotel Gaillard.

The neo-gothic mansion was designed by architect Jules Février at the request of Emile Gaillard, a banker from the city of Grenoble and amateur collector of Middle Ages and Renaissance art. The Hotel Gaillard was sold to the Bank of France in 1919.

From 1919 to 1921, architectural works were directed by architect Alphonse Defrasse for the Bank of France, especially the building of a steel structure that housed the cashier's desks and other services to the visitors. He imagined the impressive vault that could be accessed by a lift bridge, over two-meter-deep moats.

Listed as a historic monument in 1999, this branch closed in 2006, as a consequence of the plan to close half of the Bank of France's French branches.

== Architectural contest ==
Citéco was the object of an architectural contest. Over 100 teams of architects and museographers participated. The contest aimed at transforming this former bank branch into an educational Cité, while respecting the architecture of the historic building.

The winner was selected by the Bank of France from six finalists chosen by the contest jury. The winning team is made of Ateliers Lion for the architecture, François Confino for the museography, and Eric Pallot as architect in charge of historic monuments.

== Gallery ==
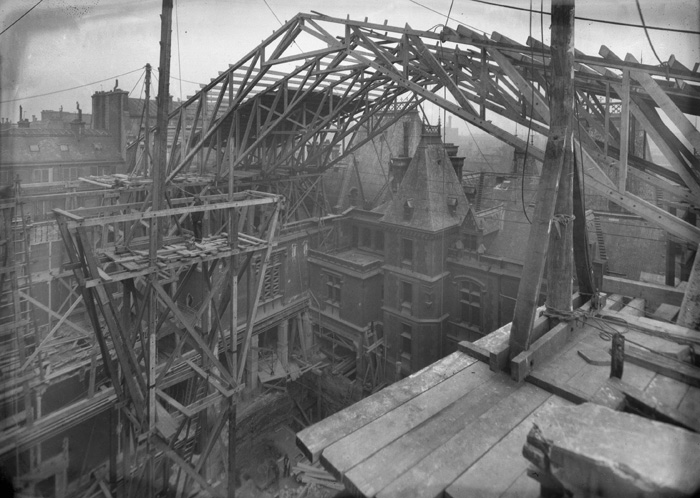
Grand Lobby construction works, conceived by the architect Alphonse Defrasse, 1921

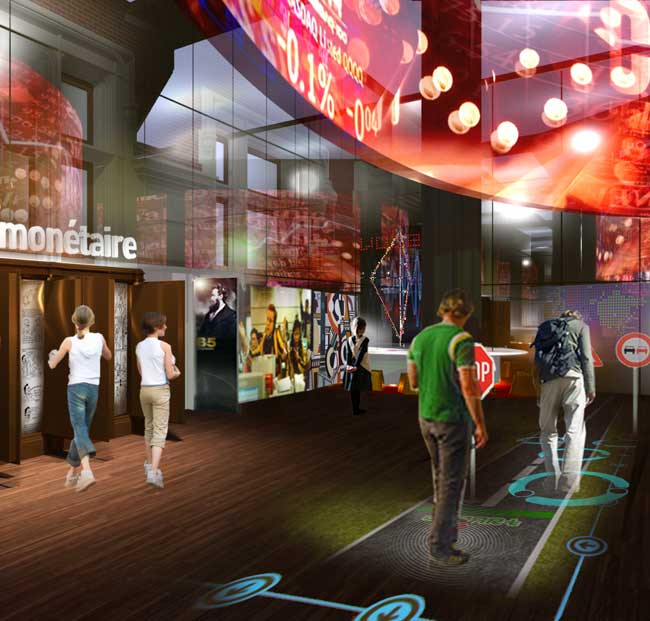
Boardroom of the future Cité de l'économie et de la monnaie, architectural and museographic contest, 2011

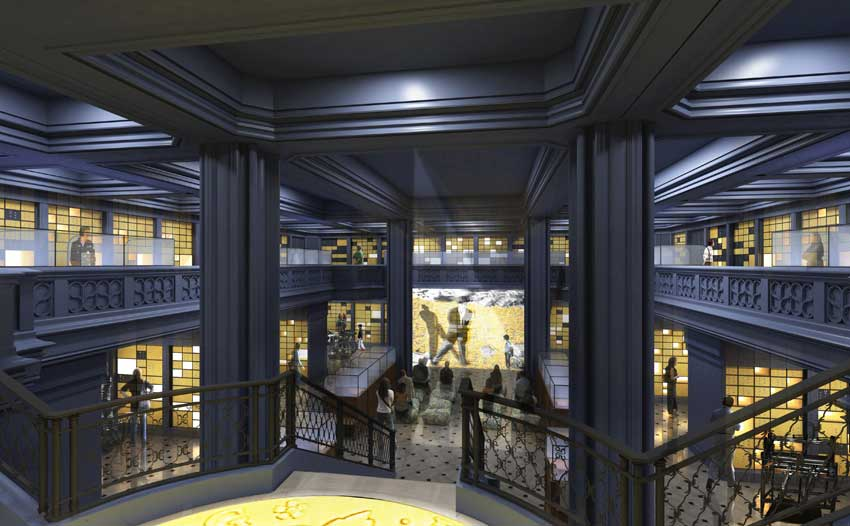
Bank Vault of the future Cité de l'économie et de la monnaie, architectural and museographic contest, 2011
