= Bank of France =

French central bank

Coordinates: 48.864478°N 2.339289°E

Bank of France Banque de France

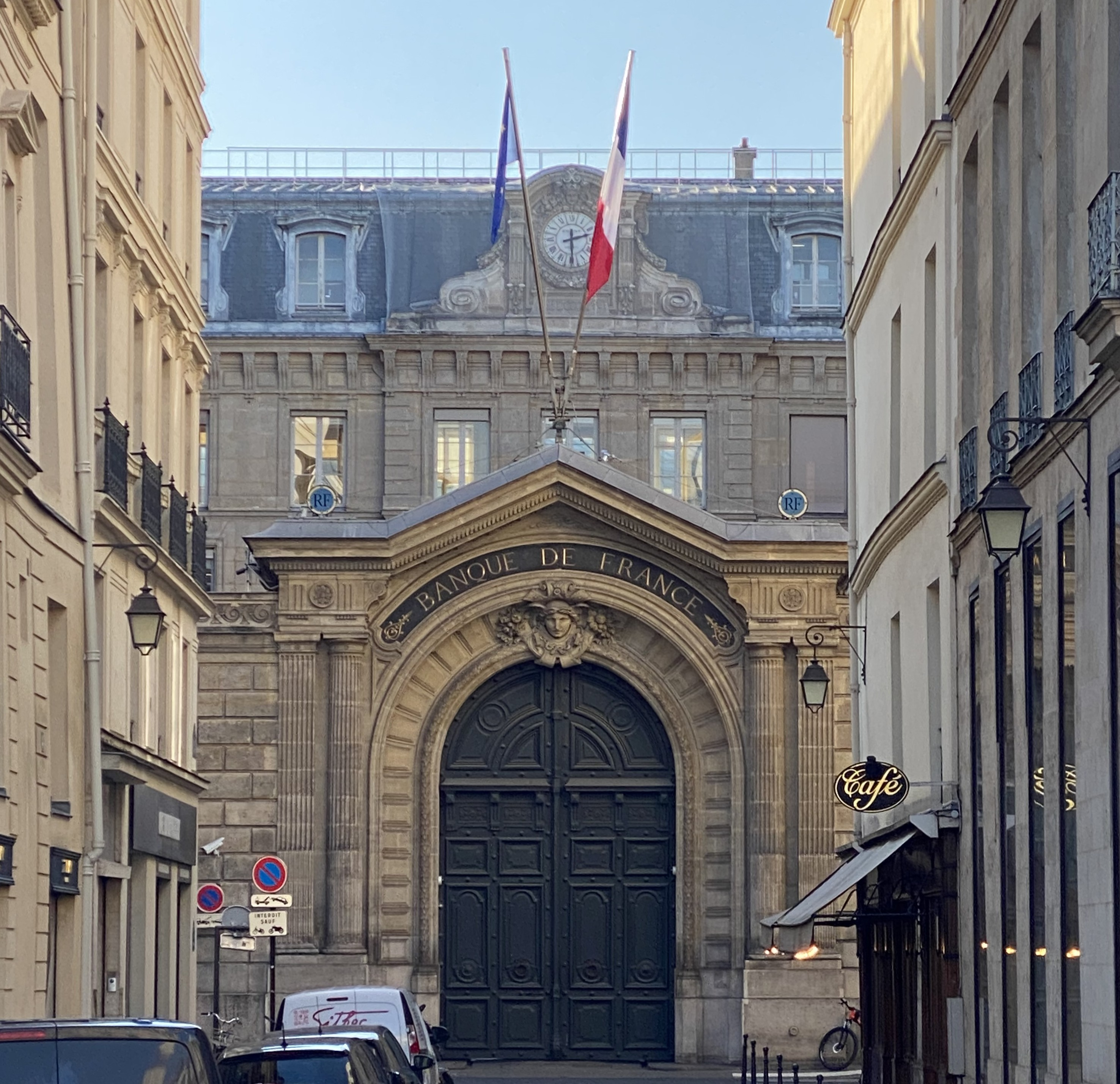
- Central bank of: France
- Headquarters: Paris, France
- Established: 18 January 1800; 226 years ago
- Ownership: 100% owned by French Government
- Governor: François Villeroy de Galhau
- Website: banque-france.fr/en

The Bank of France (French: Banque de France [bɑ̃k də fʁɑ̃s]) is the national central bank for France within the Eurosystem. It was the French central bank between 1800 and 1998, issuing the French franc.

The Bank of France was originally established by Napoleon Bonaparte as a private-sector corporation with unique public status. It was granted note-issuance monopoly in Paris in 1803 and in the entire country in 1848. Long independent from direct political interference, it was brought under government control in 1936 and eventually nationalized in 1945. While other banks of issue were established in the French colonial empire, the Bank of France remained Metropolitan France's sole monetary authority until France's adoption of the euro as its currency. As of 2025, its balance sheet total was $1.818 trillion, making it the 5th largest central bank in the world.

The Bank of France long held high prestige as an anchor of financial stability, especially before the monetary turmoil that followed World War I. In 1907, Italian economist and statesman Luigi Luzzatti referred to the Bank of France as "the centre of the world's monetary power."

The French framework for banking supervision was initiated by the Vichy Government in 1941 and entrusted from the start to a separate body under the aegis of the Bank of France, which in 2013 became the Prudential Supervision and Resolution Authority (French acronym ACPR). In 2017 the ACPR lost its prior status as an independent administrative authority under French law, but retains a distinct governance framework that also involves the French government. The Bank of France is not itself a financial supervisory authority, but oversees payment systems and participates in European banking supervision as a member of the Supervisory Board of the European Central Bank alongside the ACPR. It is also a member of the European Systemic Risk Board (ESRB).

== History ==
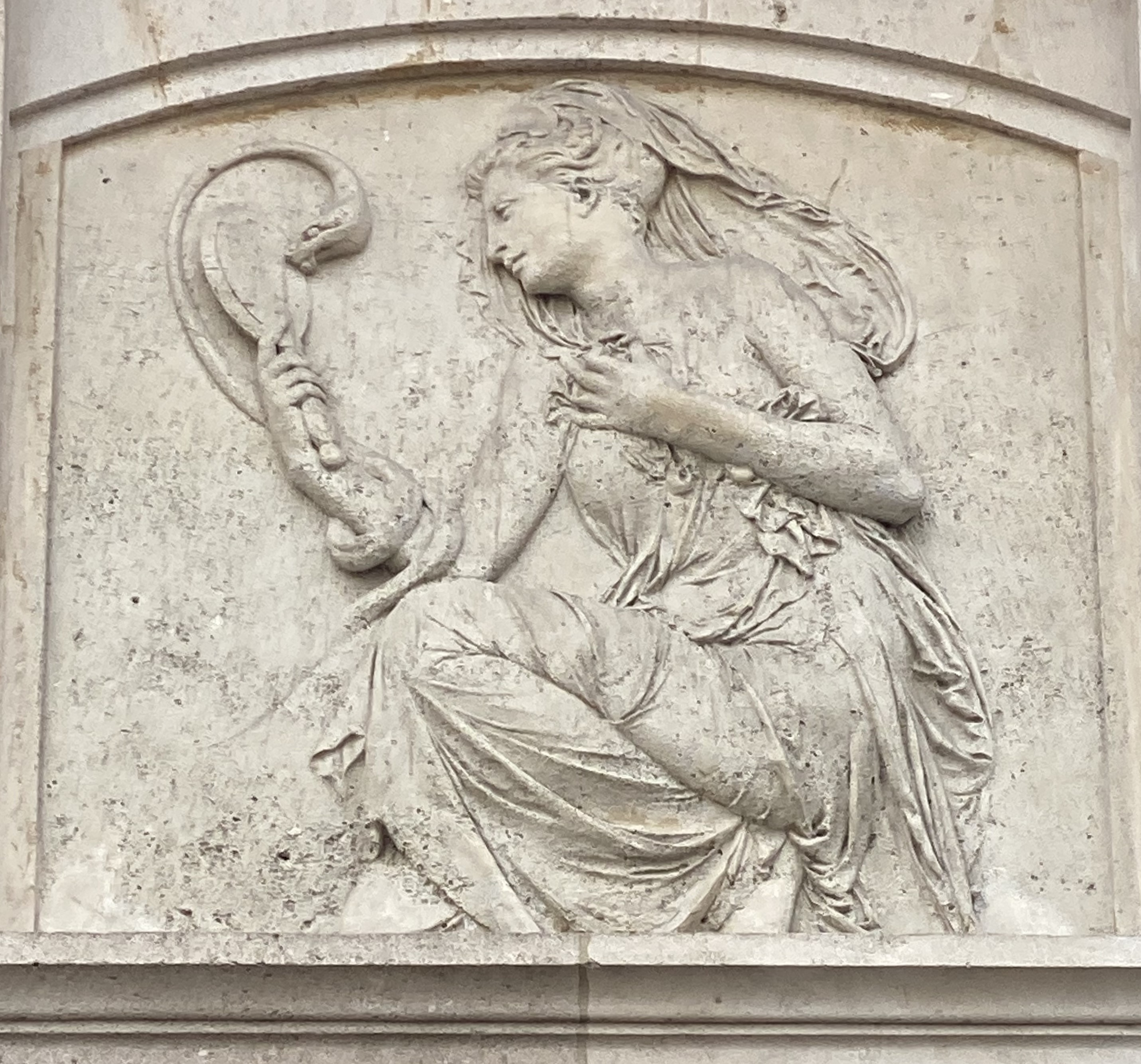
Allegory of Prudence on the bank's main entrance façade on rue de la Vrillière

=== Background ===
The Kingdom of France's first experiment with a central bank was the Banque Générale (Banque Générale Privée or "General Private Bank"), set up by John Law at the behest of the Duke of Orléans after the death of Louis XIV. Law received the bank's 20-year charter in May 1716 and its stock consisted of 1,200 shares valued at 5,000 livres apiece. It was meant to stimulate France's stagnant economy and pay down its staggering national debt acquired from Louis XIV's wars, including the War of the Spanish Succession. It was nationalized in December 1718 at Law's request and formally renamed the Banque Royale a month later. It saw great initial success, increasing industry 60% in two years, but Law's mercantilist policies saw him seek to establish large monopolies, leading to the Mississippi bubble. The bubble ultimately burst in a financial crisis in 1720, and on 27 November of that year, the Banque Royale officially closed.

The collapse of the Mississippi Company and the Banque Royale tarnished the word banque ("bank") so much that France abandoned central banking for almost a century, possibly precipitating Louis XVI's economic crisis and the French Revolution. Successors such as the Caisse d'Escompte (from 1776 to 1793) and Caisse d'escompte du commerce (from 1797 to 1803) used the word "caisse" instead, until Napoleon retook the term with la Banque de France ("Bank of France") in 1800.

=== Creation ===
In 1803, financial power in France was in the hands of fifteen members of the Haute Banque, when the shareholders' meeting ratified the appointment of a “Council of Regency" composed of Jean-Frédéric Perregaux, Guillaume Mallet, Jean-Barthélemy Le Couteulx de Canteleu, Joseph Hugues-Lagarde, Jacques-Rose Récamier, Jean-Pierre Germain, Carié-Bézard, Pierre-Léon Basterrèche, Jean-Auguste Sévène, Alexandre Barrillon, Georges-Antoine Ricard, Georges-Victor Demautort, Claude Perier, Pierre-Nicolas Perrée-Duhamel, Jacques-Florent Robillard, and Jean-Conrad Hottinguer. These powerful bankers, representative of the financial elite that would become referred to in France as the Haute banque, were deeply involved in the agitations leading up to the French Revolution. When the revolutionary violence got out of hand, they orchestrated the rise of Napoleon Bonaparte, whom they regarded as the restorer of order. As a reward for their support, Napoleon, in 1800, gave the bankers a monopoly over French finance by giving them control of the new Bank of France (Banque de France). Banker Claude Perier drafted the first statutes and Emmanuel Crétet was the first governor of the Bank.

On 24 Germinal, year XI (14 April 1803), the new Bank received its first official charter granting it the exclusive right to issue paper money in Paris for fifteen years.

=== Development ===
On 22 April 1806, a new law replaced the Central Committee with a Governor and two Deputy Governors. All three were appointed by the Emperor. On 16 January 1808, a decree set out the "Basic Statutes", which were to govern the Bank's operations until 1936.

For the first fifteen years, the Bank of France was the sole issuer of bank notes in Paris, and this privilege was extended to other financially important cities and the rest of the country by 1848.

The Bank was also instrumental in the creation of the Latin Monetary Union (LMU) in 1865. The countries of France, Belgium, Italy, and the Swiss Confederation established the LMU franc as a common bimetallic currency.

In World War I, the Bank sold short-term Treasury bonds abroad to help pay for wartime expenditures. France abandoned the gold standard shortly after the outbreak of war. Debts amounted to approximately 42 billion francs by 1919. Following the war, the Bank sought to re-establish the gold standard and acquired capital from a number of American and British banking syndicates to defend the franc from exchange-rate fluctuations. The Bank also began to hoard gold reserves and, at its peak, held 28.3 percent of the world's gold stock (only behind the United States at 30.4 percent). Some scholars have asserted that this gold accumulation was a contributing factor to the Great Depression. Under Émile Moreau, Governor from 1926 to 1930, the Bank consolidated gold reserves created a stabilization insurance fund (fonds de stabilisation), and tested new monetary policies in the wake of a global depression.

In World War II, the Bank oversaw the transfer of gold reserves overseas, which mainly included Canada, the United States, and the French overseas territories. In 1945, the Bank was nationalized by Charles de Gaulle and became a state-owned institution. Existing shareholders received bonds to replace their shares in the company. The Bank's statute was reformed in 1973.

In 1993, the Bank of France was again reformed when it obtained independence from the state. It sought to establish credibility by promising to adhere to the single mandate of price stability. Jean-Claude Trichet, Governor from 1993 to 2003, was the final Governor of the Bank until the establishment of the European Central Bank (ECB) in June 1998. Today, the ECB sets monetary policy and oversees price stability for all countries in the Eurozone, including France.

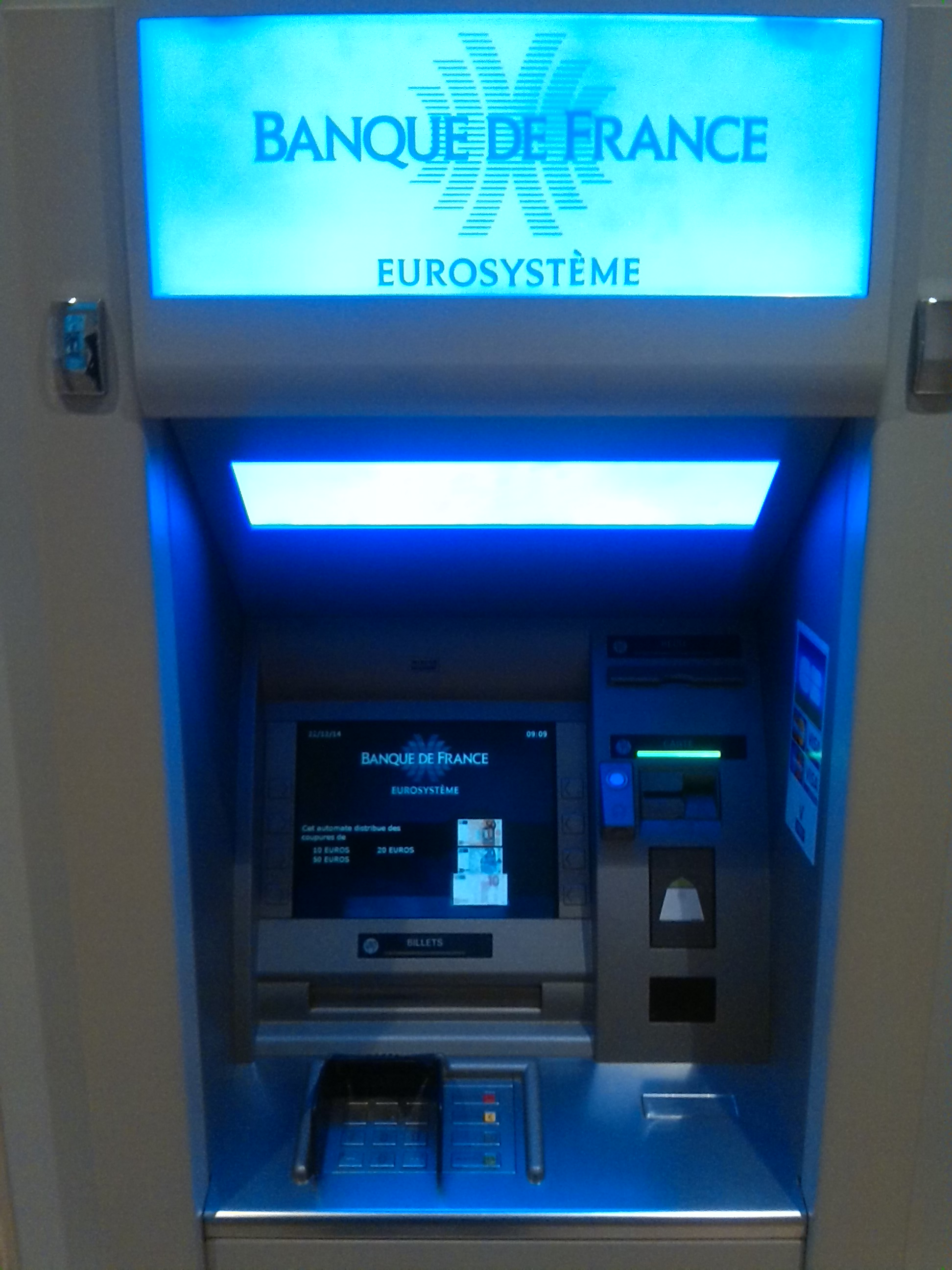
ATM of the Bank of France in Paris

On 1 June 1998, a new institution was created, the European Central Bank (ECB), charged with steering the single monetary policy for the euro. The body formed by the ECB, and the national central banks (NCB) of all the member states of the European Union, constitute the European System of Central Banks (ESCB). According to the Maastrict Treaty, the Bank would oversee the functioning of the payment system and conduct independent research on the French economy, while the newly established European Central Bank conducted monetary policy for the entire Eurozone. The French franc was replaced by the Euro as a virtual currency on 1 January 1999, being replaced entirely with coins and banknotes on 1 March 2002.

Following the Great Recession, the Bank of France implemented quantitative easing for the account of the ECB.

In 2010, the French government's Autorité de la concurrence (the department in charge of regulating competition) fined eleven banks, including Bank of France, the sum of €384,900,000 for colluding to charge unjustified fees on check processing, especially for extra fees charged during the transition from paper check transfer to "Exchanges Check-Image" electronic transfer.

The Bank recently established a "Lab", located on the Rue Réaumur in Paris, where start-ups and small businesses work on blockchain, artificial intelligence, and virtual reality. The Bank is the first to set up a blockchain system.

With the onset of the COVID-19 pandemic and the ensuing economic crisis, the Eurosystem resolved to inject €3 trillion of liquidity into banks, allowing them in turn to support households and businesses, particularly with regard to urgent cash flow needs. In addition to membership in the Eurosystem, the Banque de France is in charge of credit mediation. This service, which has been in very high demand during the crisis, provides assistance to companies facing difficulties in their relations with financial institutions. The Banque de France manages procedures to resolve overindebtedness, and while its premises are no longer open to the public, requests continue to be processed.

== Activities ==
The Bank of France describes itself as responsible for three missions: monetary strategy, financial stability, and services to the economy.

=== Monetary policy ===
The Bank of France contributes to the design of the monetary policy of the Eurozone, through macroeconomic research and forecast and by taking part in the deliberations on ECB decisions, and implements it in France. It prints euro bank notes, in larger volumes than any of its Eurosystem peers, and manages the circulation of bank notes and coins. It also participates in the fight against counterfeit money, by training bank employees, merchants, police, and other stakeholders. It manages part of the foreign exchange reserves of the ECB.

=== Financial stability ===
The Bank of France participates in the prudential oversight of the French financial sector through the Prudential Supervision and Resolution Authority (ACPR) which operates under its aegis.

The Banque de France also has special responsibilities with regard to payment systems and financial market infrastructures. It has direct oversight responsibility over LCH SA, a central counterparty (CCP); Euroclear France and ID2S, two central securities depositories; and CORE(FR) and SEPA.EU, two retail payment systems operated by STET SA. It is also involved in the cooperative oversight of ten infrastructures for which the lead oversight role belongs to another institution:

- Four infrastructures under the Eurosystem oversight framework led by the European Central Bank: T2, T2S, EURO1, and STEP2-T;
- Four EU-based CCPs with an EMIR College: LCH Ltd (led by the Bank of England), Eurex Clearing (led by BaFin), CC&G (led by the Bank of Italy), and EuroCCP (led by De Nederlandsche Bank);
- Two global infrastructures with an international cooperative oversight framework, SWIFT (led by the National Bank of Belgium) and CLS (led by the U.S. Federal Reserve).

Like many other central banks, the Bank of France publishes a periodical Financial Stability Review (Revue de la Stabilité Financière).

=== Services to the economy ===
The Bank of France provides services to households, businesses, and the French state:

- It is in charge of offering services to households in severe financial difficulty. This includes the management of over-indebtedness (one of the major tasks of the local branches of the bank), and the guarantee to an access to basic banking services for everyone, such as the right to a basic bank account. It is also in charge of financial and economic education of the general public, by developing an economic culture among specific populations (like youngsters and households in severe financial difficulty). This includes sensitizing high school students, providing online information and educational services, training social workers and the launch of the French Cité de l'économie et de la monnaie (Citéco), a museum based in the 17th district of Paris, in 2019.
- It provides company ratings for non-listed companies, which can for instance be used by business leaders to obtain credit from their bank. It also manages credit mediation (mediation between companies and their banks, their credit insurers, etc.) and proposes support to very small businesses (advice for their development and needs). The Bank of France publishes a number of economic surveys, national and regional statistics, destined to businesses.
- In 2016, the Bank de France created the "Semaine de l'éducation financière" (the Financial Literacy Week), an annual initiative held in March to promote financial literacy through workshops, conferences, and educational activities across France.

== Governance ==
The governor of the Bank of France is appointed by the president and is, since 2 June 2026, Emmanuel Moulin. He presides over the Bank's General Council, the body responsible for deliberating on all matters relating to non-Eurosystem activities. As of late 2023, the first deputy governor was Denis Beau and the second deputy governor was Agnès Bénassy-Quéré.

== Key figures ==
In 2019, the main key figures of the Bank of France are as follows:

- Number of full-time employees: 9 000
- Regional branches: 95
- Profit before tax : 6.5 billion euros
- Dividend distributed to the French state : 6.1 billion euros
- Gold reserves: 106.1 billion euros
- Gold stock in France: 2,436 tons

The Bank distributed dividends to the French state of 4.5 billion euros in 2016, 5.0 billion euros in 2017 and 6.1 billion euros in 2019.

== Buildings ==
A decree on 6 March 1808 authorized the Bank to purchase the former mansion of the Count of Toulouse in the rue de la Vrillière in Paris for its headquarters. The bank's head office subsequently expanded from that original property, through the acquisition and remodeling of adjacent buildings and in the surrounding neighborhood. A major expansion occurred in 1924-1927 as part of an urban renewal project that entailed the demolition of several historical buildings and the creation of a new thoroughfare, the rue du Colonel-Driant. It entailed the erection of a new complex for the bank above a large underground bunker known as the Souterraine, designed by architect Alphonse Defrasse.

The Bank of France commissioned the erection of branches in many French towns and cities, which are often prominent in the urban landscape.

In 2019, the bank opened its museum, the Cité de l'économie et de la monnaie, in a former branch in the 17th arrondissement of Paris. This followed comparable initiatives in Europe such as the Museum of the National Bank of Belgium (opened 1982), the Bank of England Museum (1988), and the Bundesbank Money Museum (1999).

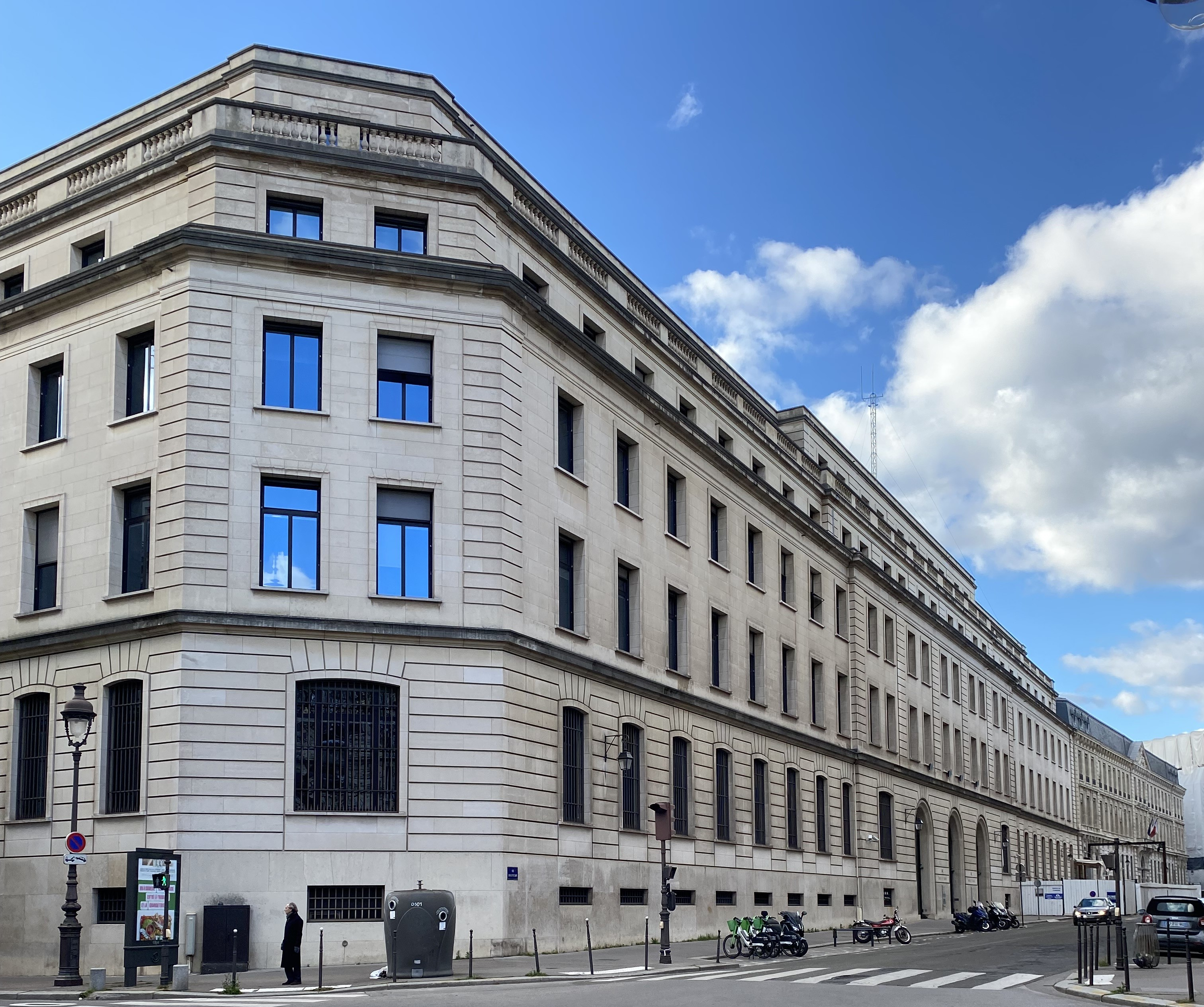
The Bank of France's main building built in the 1920s on rue Croix-des-Petits-Champs in Paris

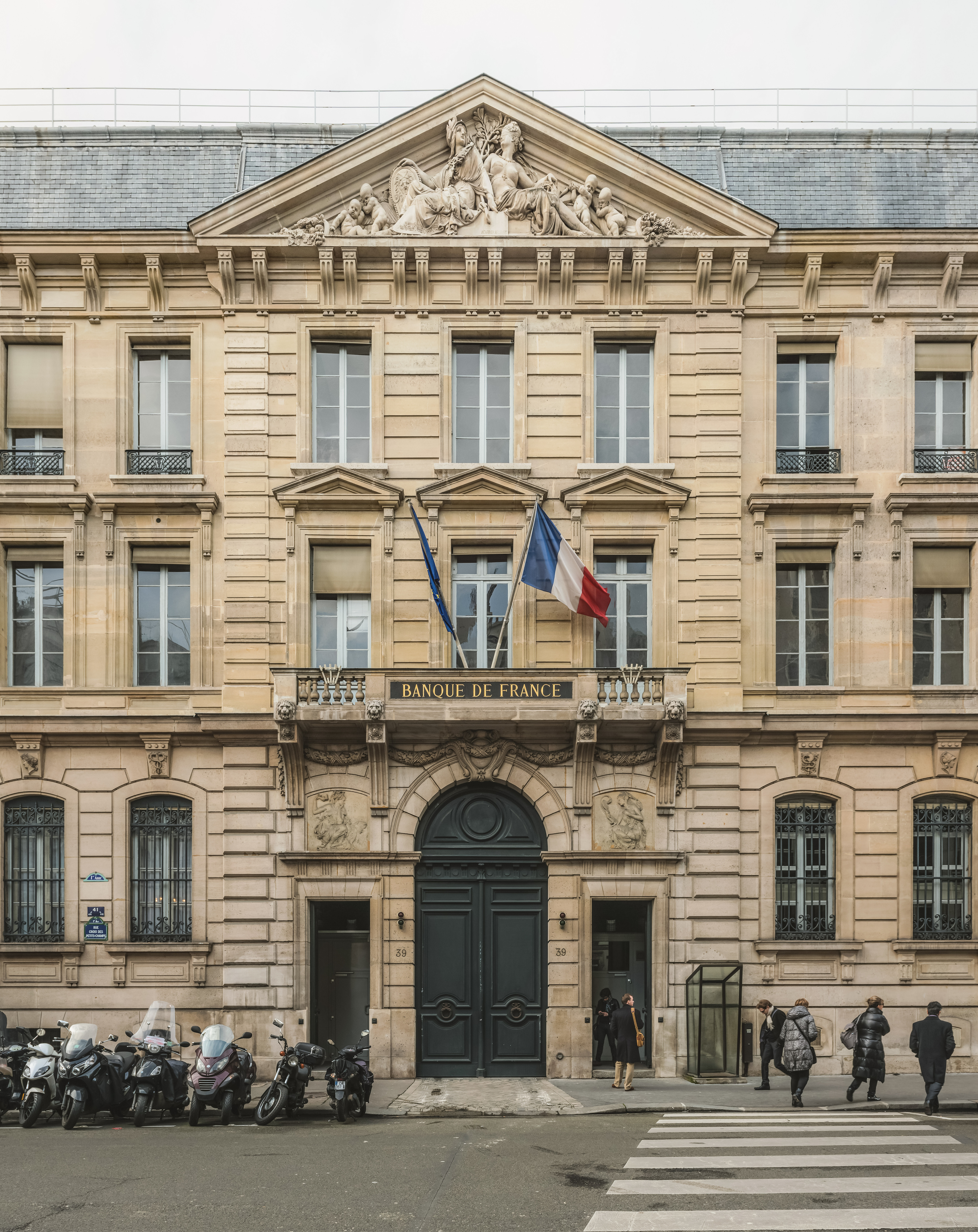
Façade of the Hôtel de Toulouse on rue Croix-des-Petits-Champs

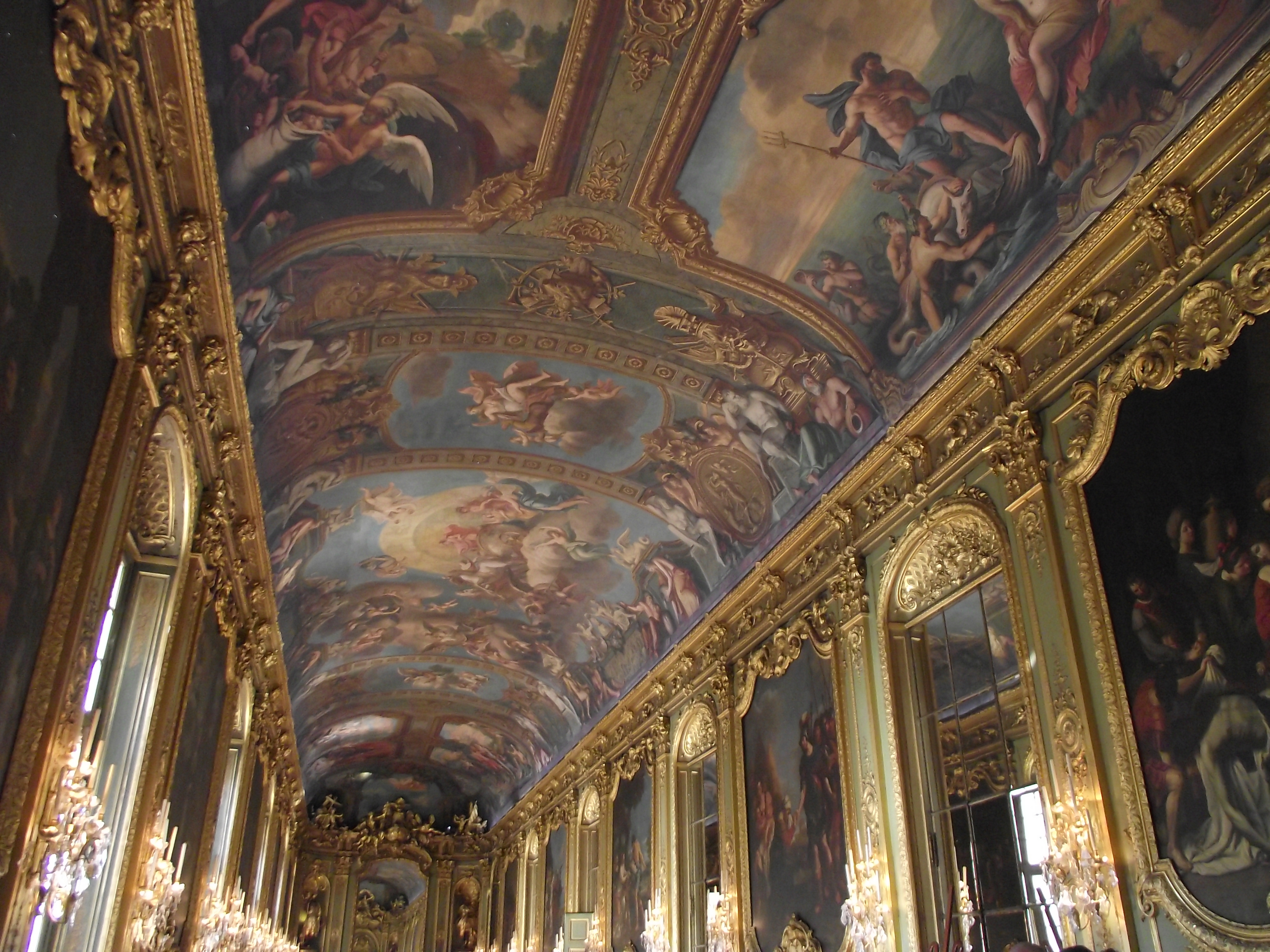
The galerie dorée, prestige room inside the Hôtel de Toulouse

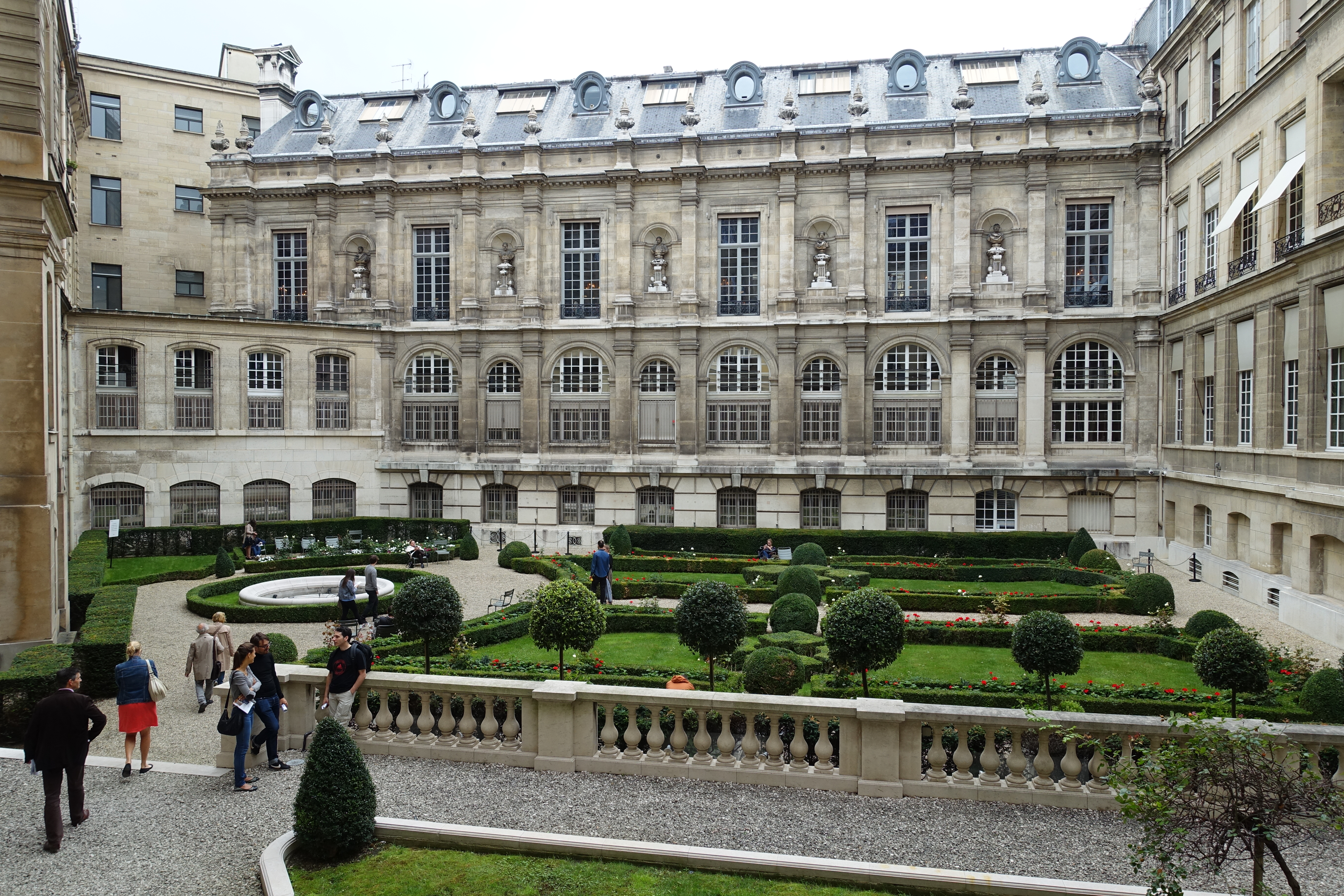
Garden of the Hôtel de Toulouse inside the Bank of France's main complex

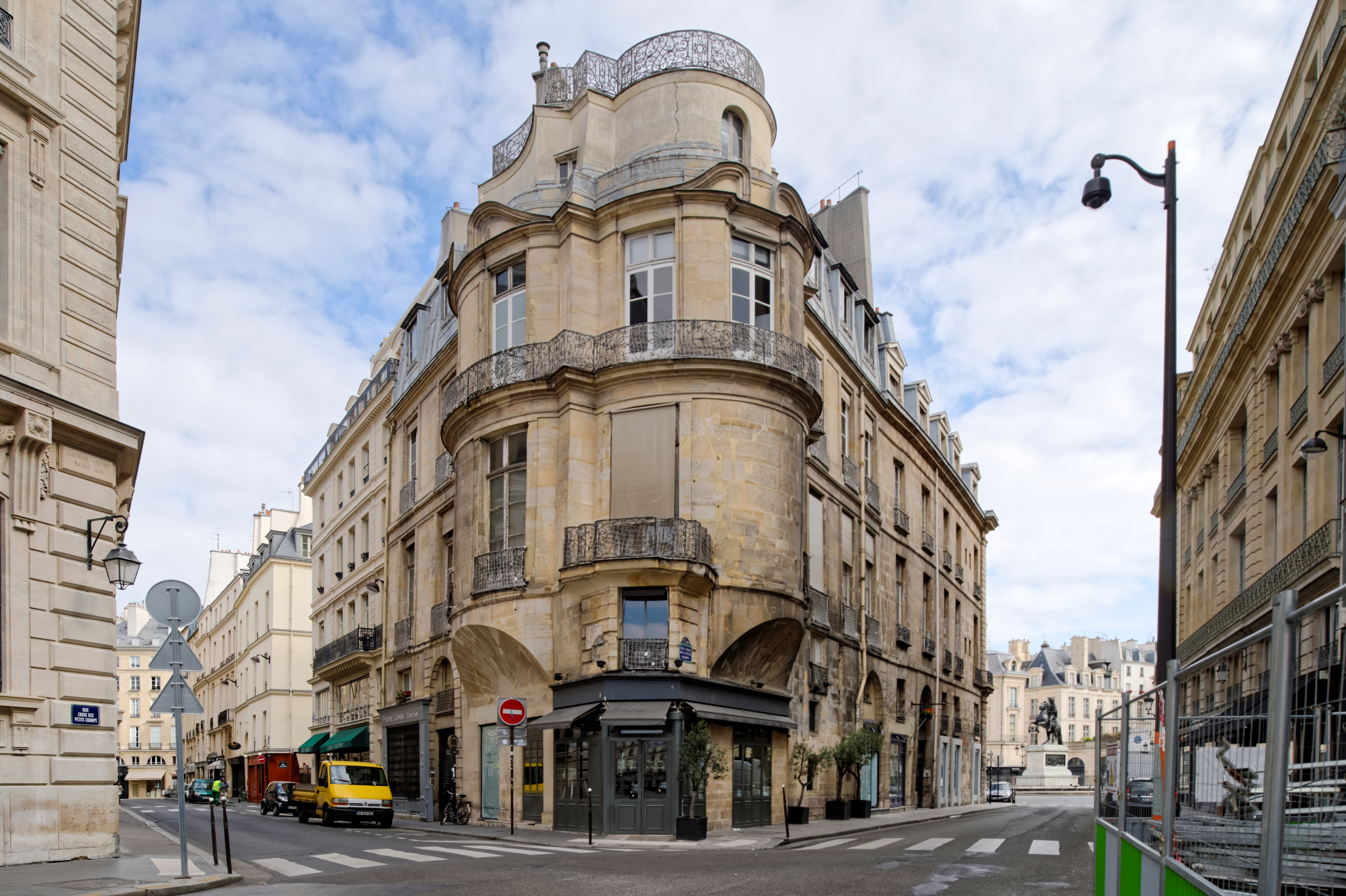
Hôtel Portalis, a nearby property also owned by the Bank of France

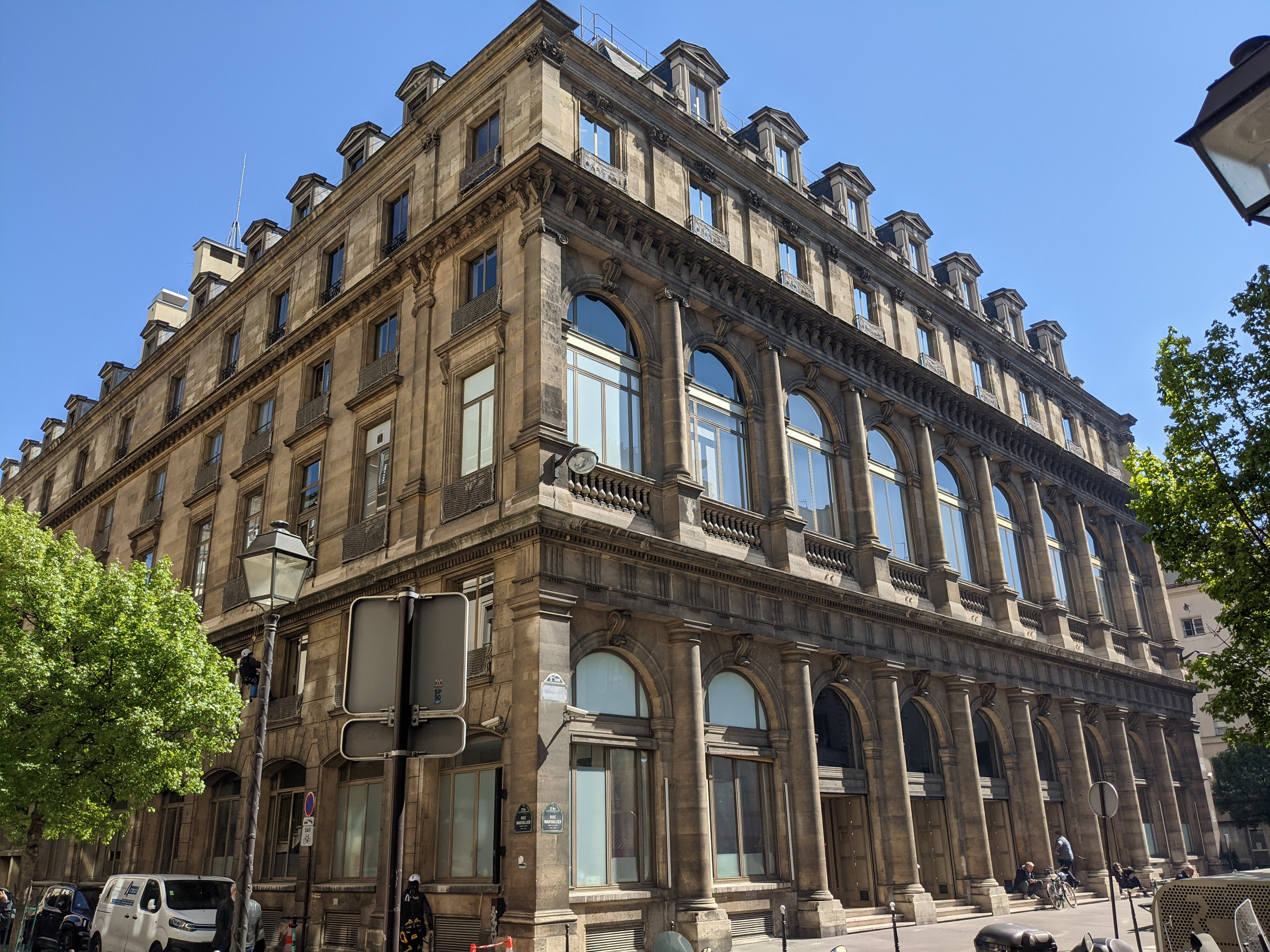
Former Salle Ventadour in Paris, used by the Bank of France since 1892

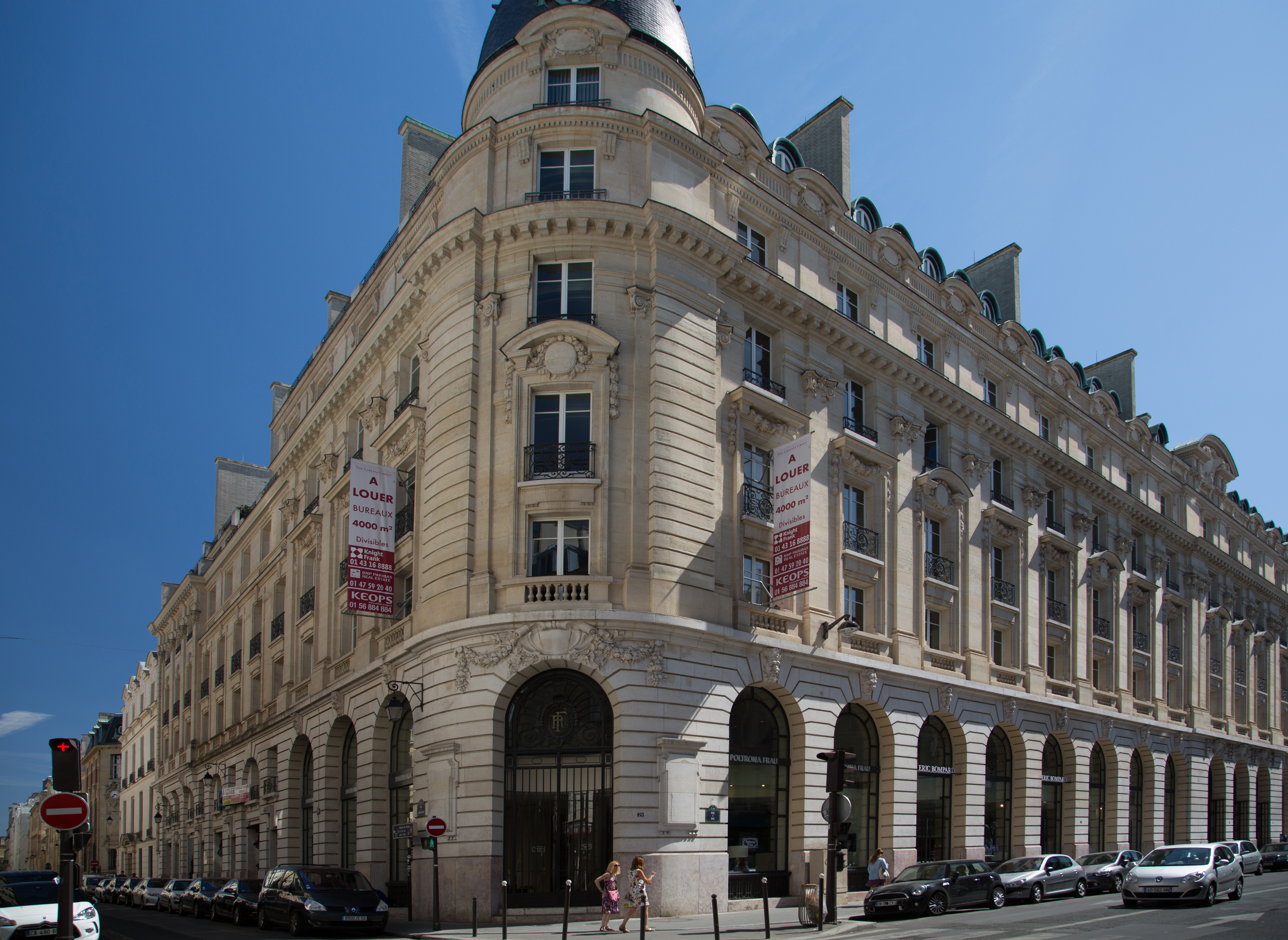
Bank of France building at the corner of Rue du Bac and Rue de l'Université in Paris

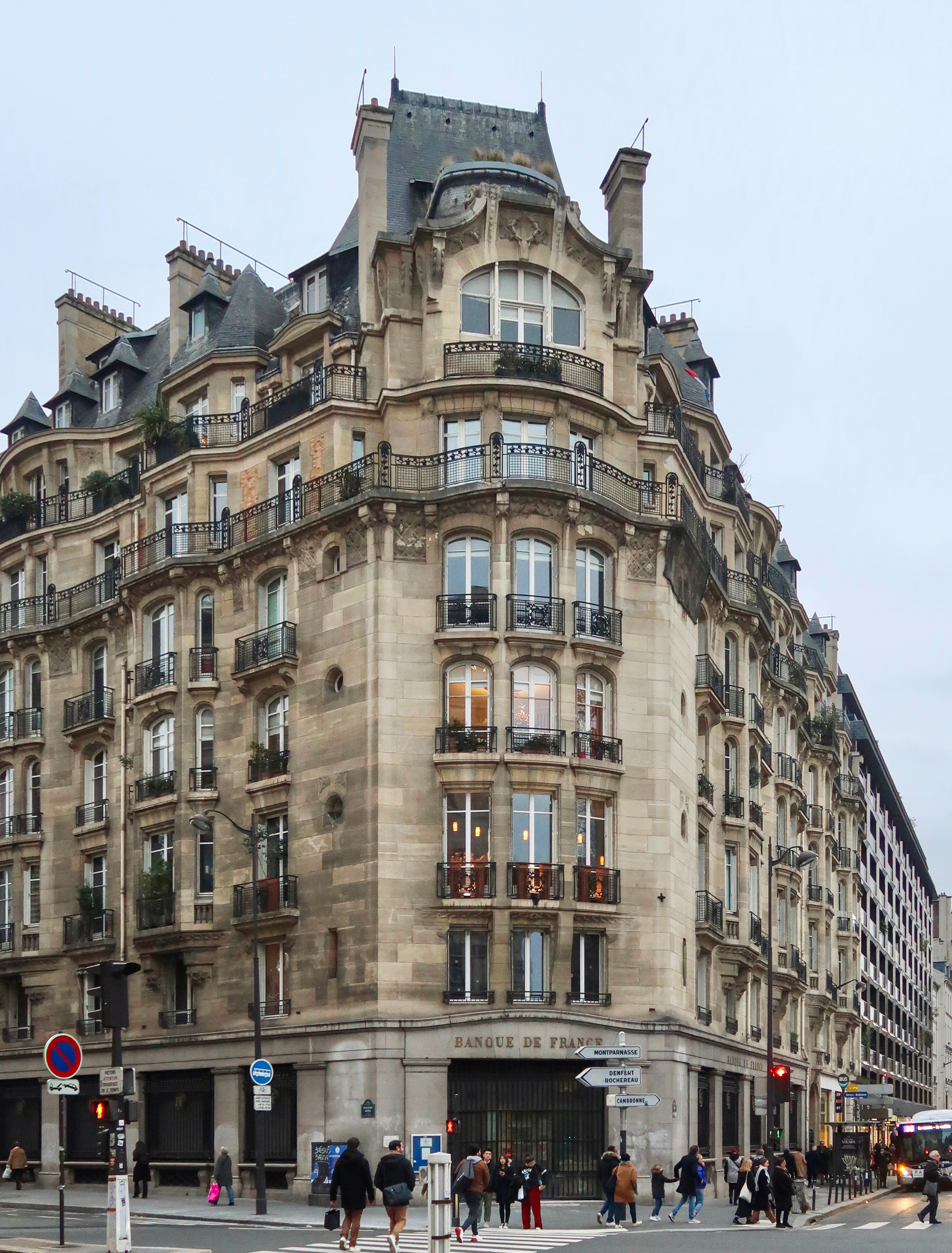
Bank of France building at the corner of Boulevard Raspail and Rue de Sèvres in Paris

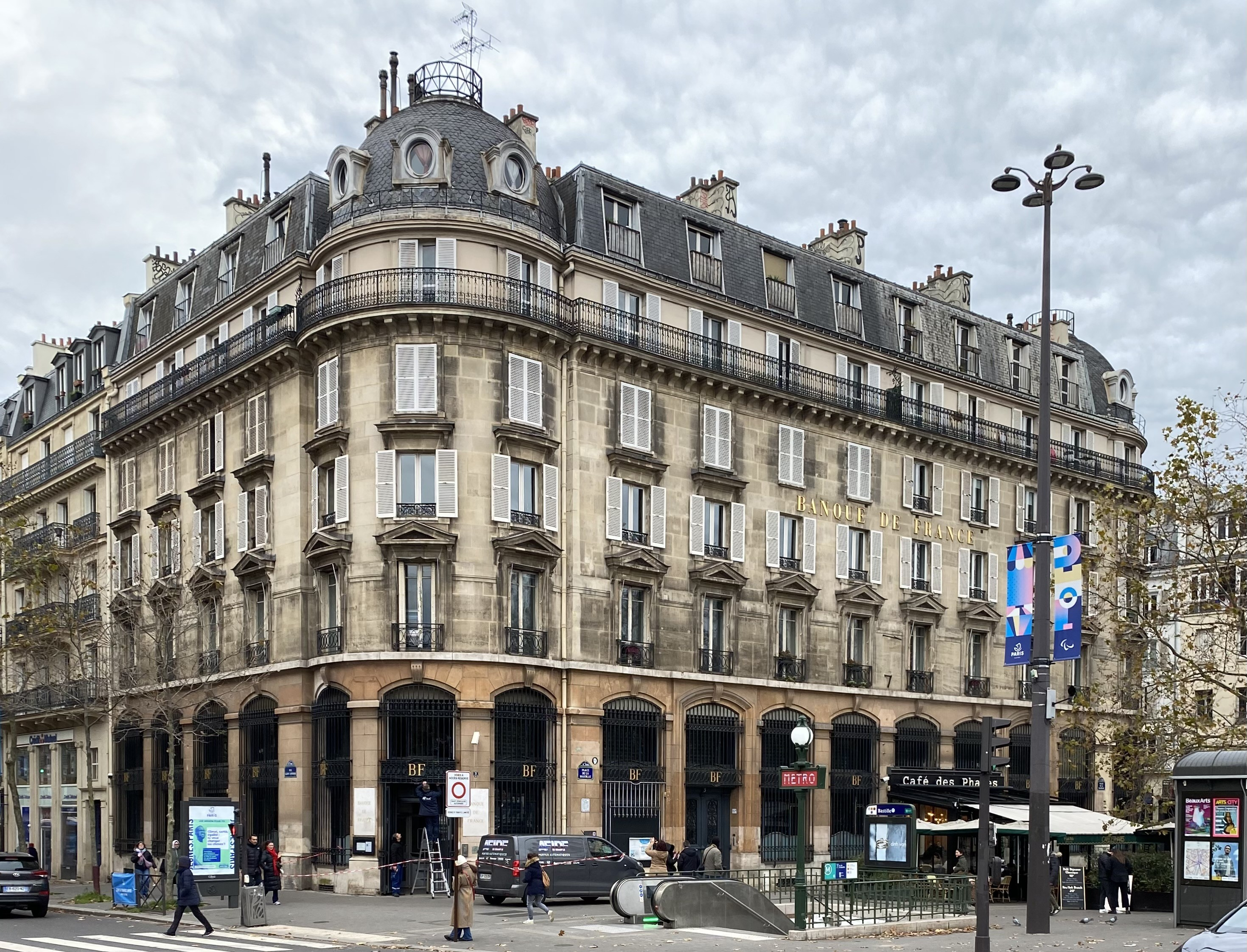
Bank of France building on Place de la Bastille, corner of rue Saint-Antoine in Paris

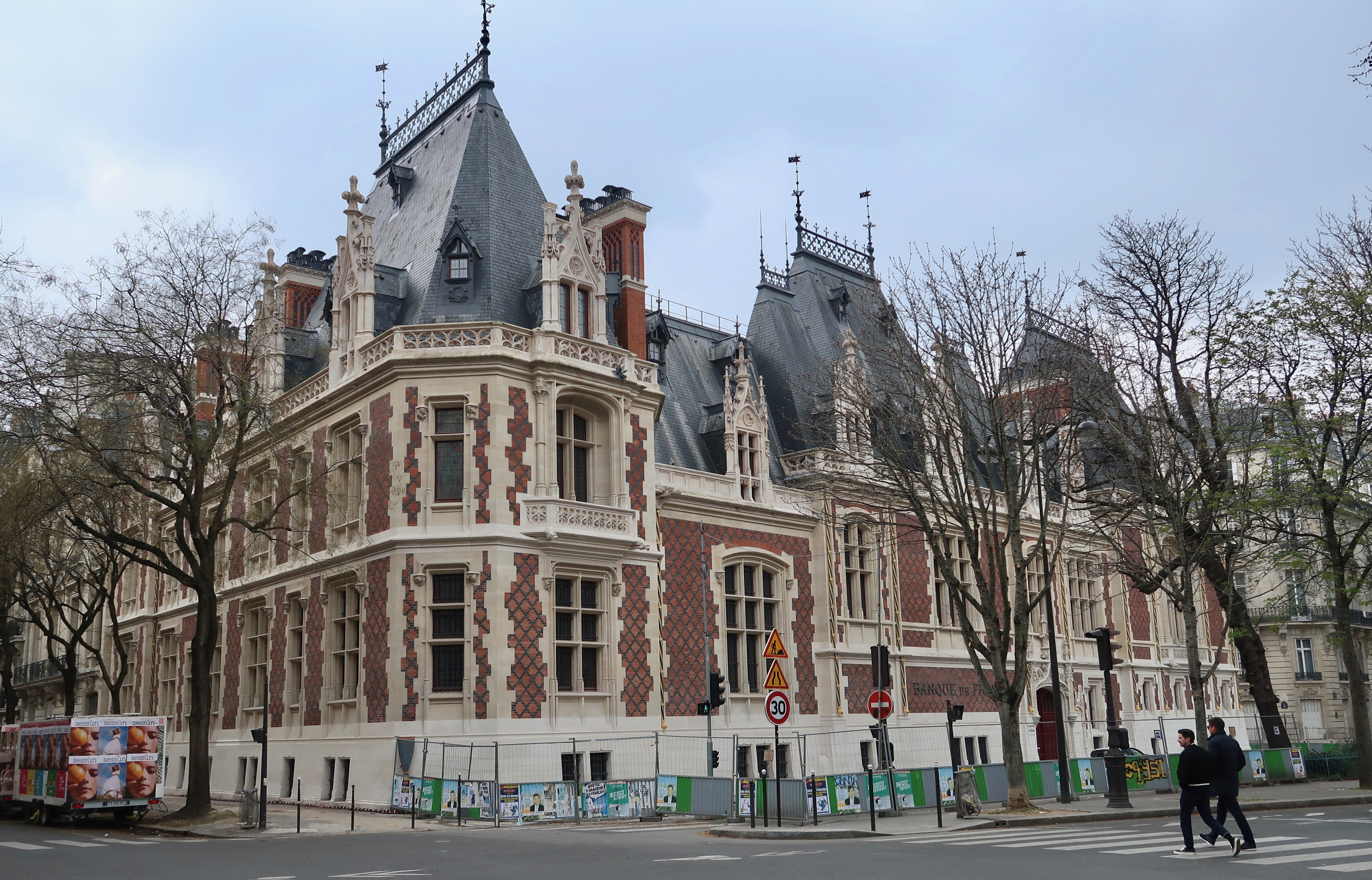
Hôtel Gaillard in Paris, lately the Bank of France's Museum

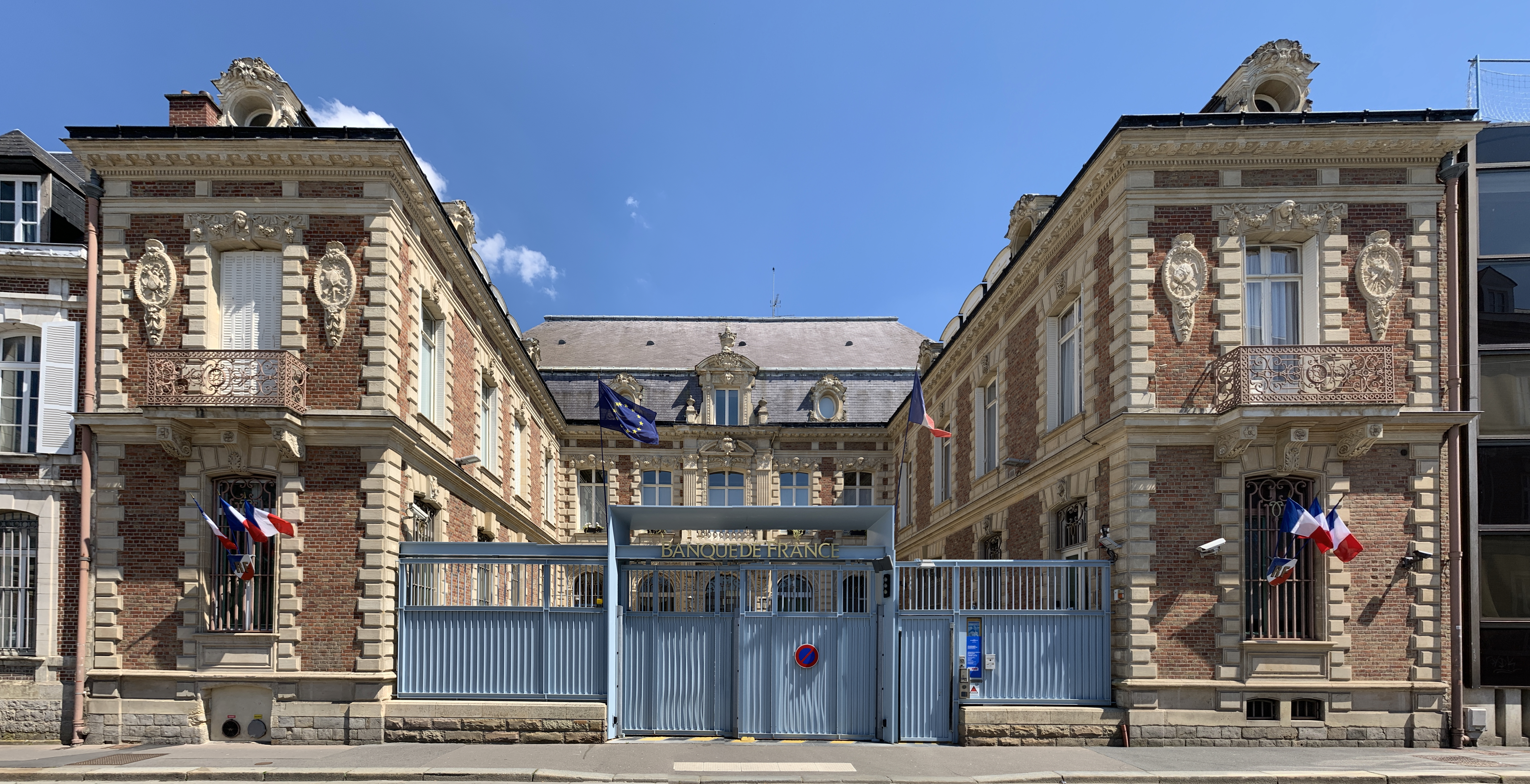
Branch in Amiens

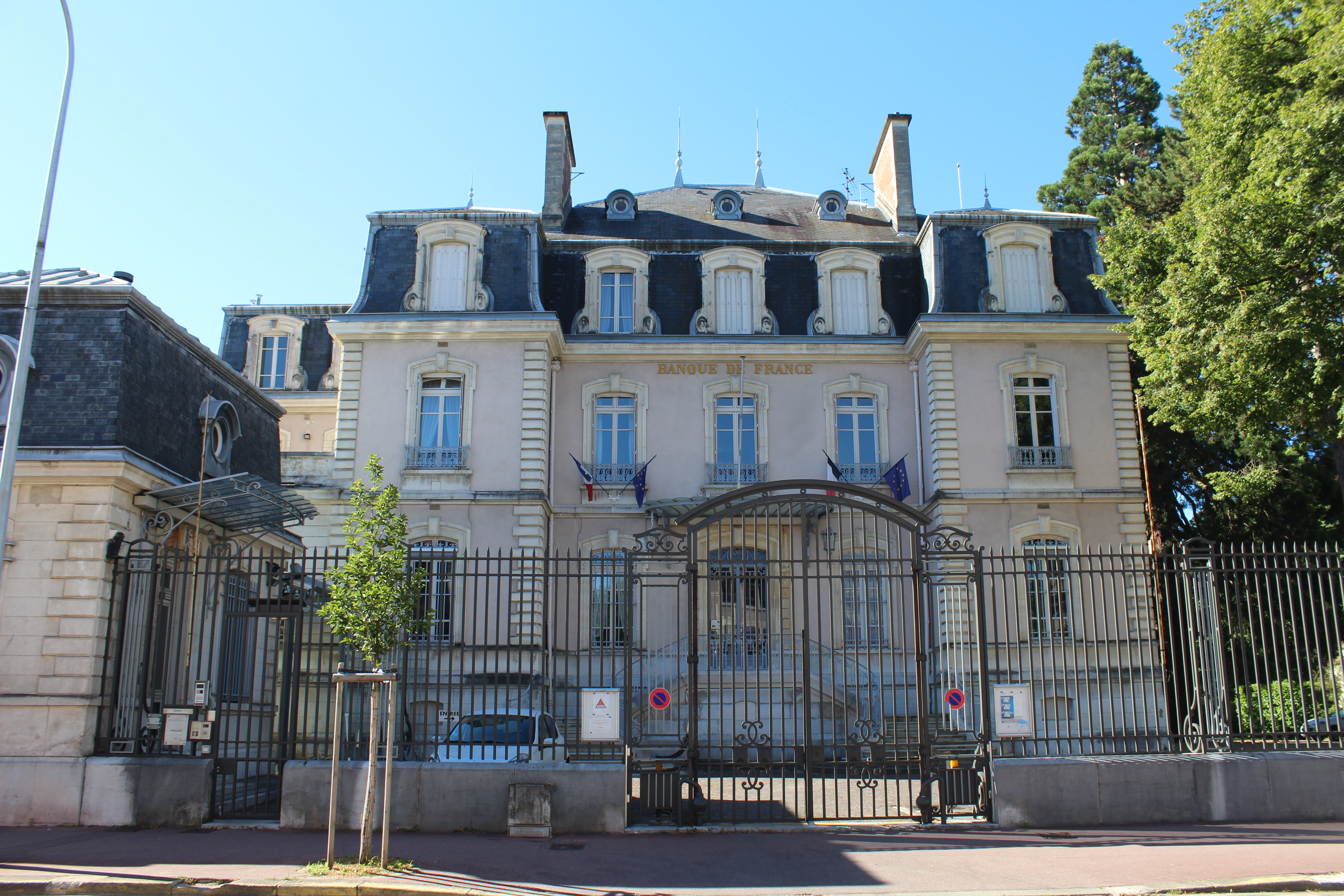
Branch in Bourg-en-Bresse

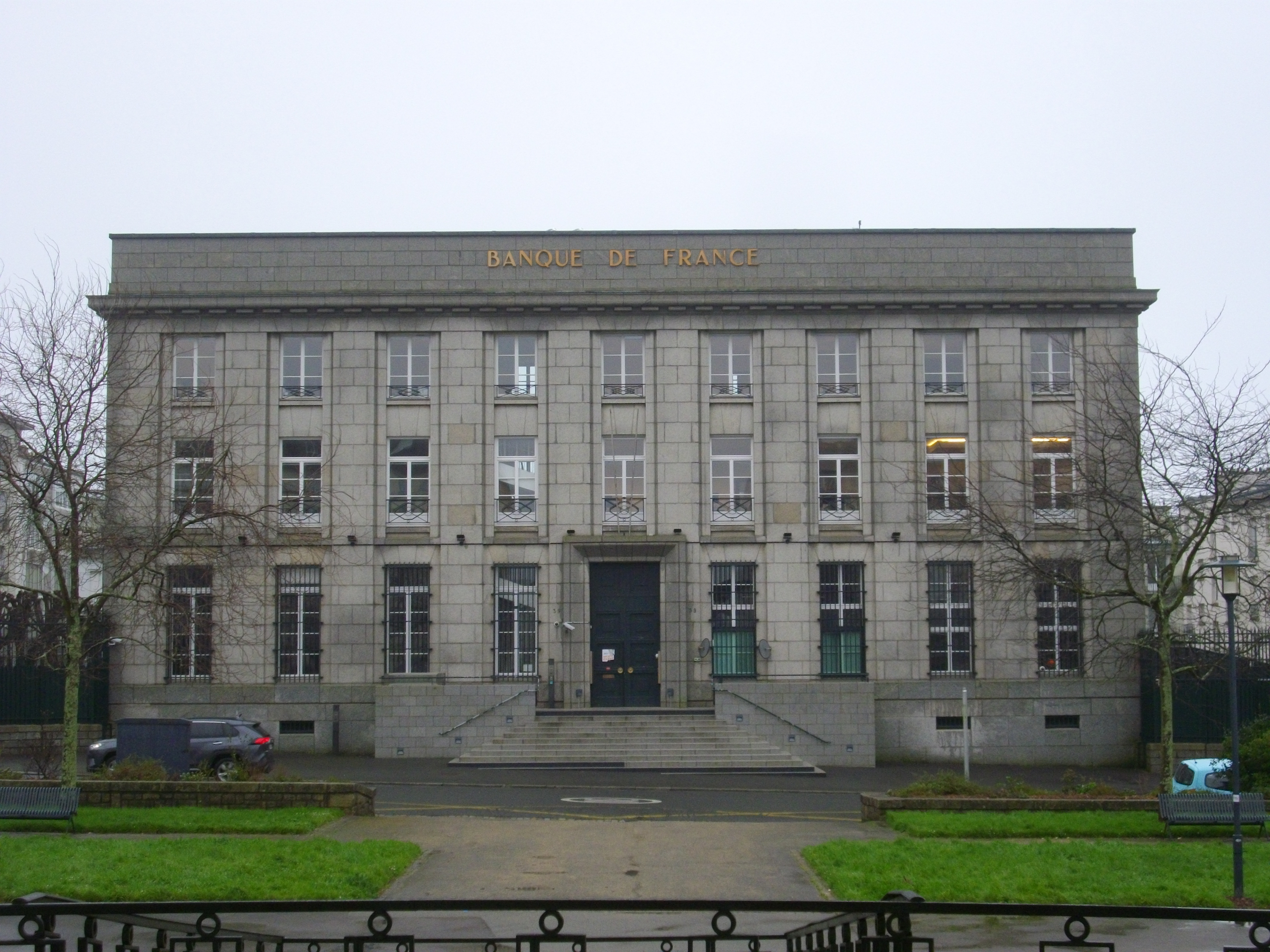
Branch in Brest

== See also ==
- Economy of France
- Banques départementales
- French franc
- Governor of the Bank de France
- List of central banks
- List of banks in France
- Anti–money laundering framework for financial institutions in France
