= Hôtel Gaillard =

Coordinates: 48°52′55″N 2°18′38″E

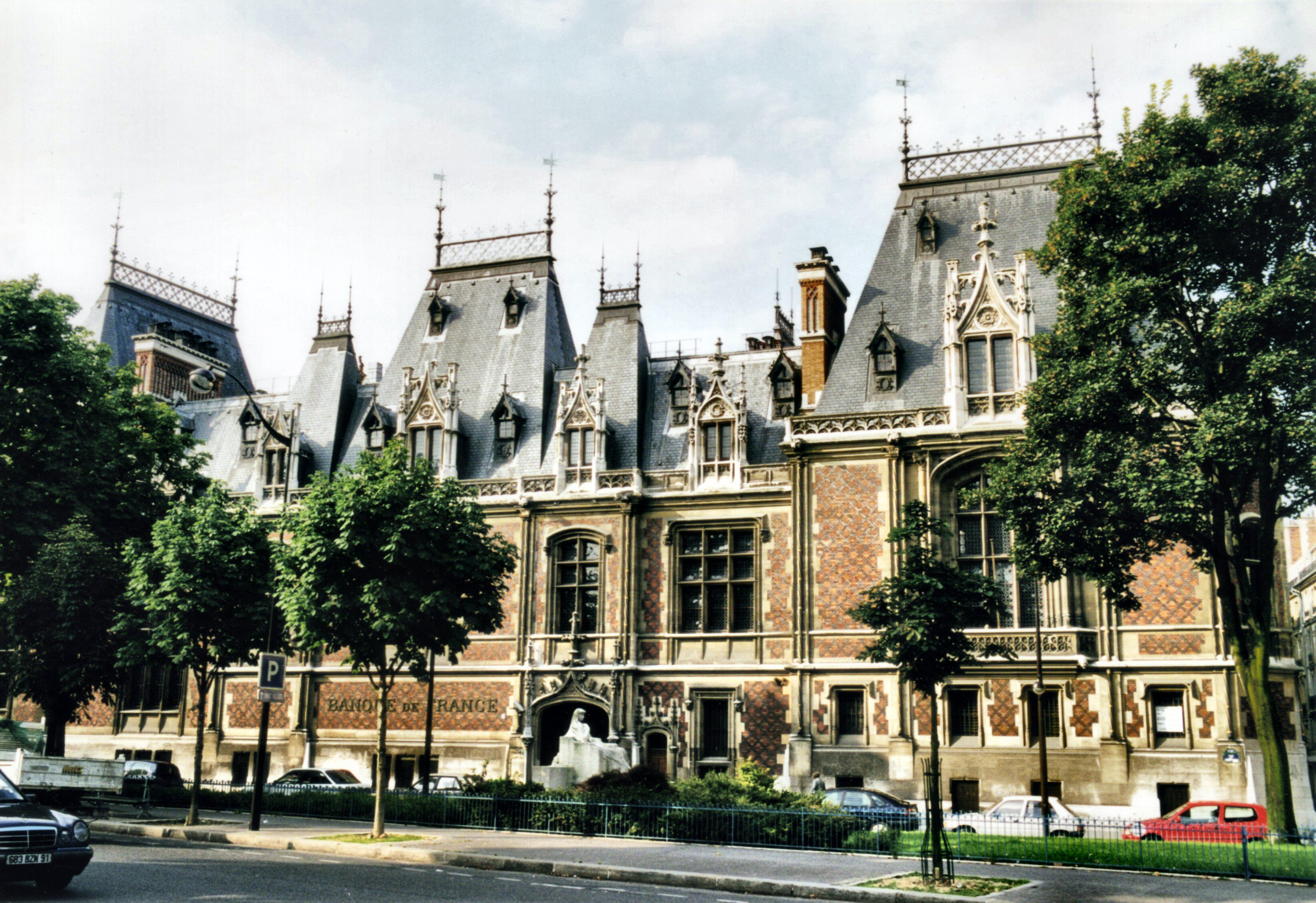
The Hôtel Gaillard in 2000

The Hôtel Gaillard (French pronunciation: [otɛl ɡajaʁ]) is a Parisian hôtel particulier built between 1878 and 1882 by architect Jules Février at the request of banker Émile Gaillard. It is located at 1, Place du Général-Catroux, in the 17th arrondissement of Paris. It has hosted since 2019 the Cité de l'économie et de la monnaie (Citéco), sponsored by the Bank of France, current proprietor of the building.

== The builder ==
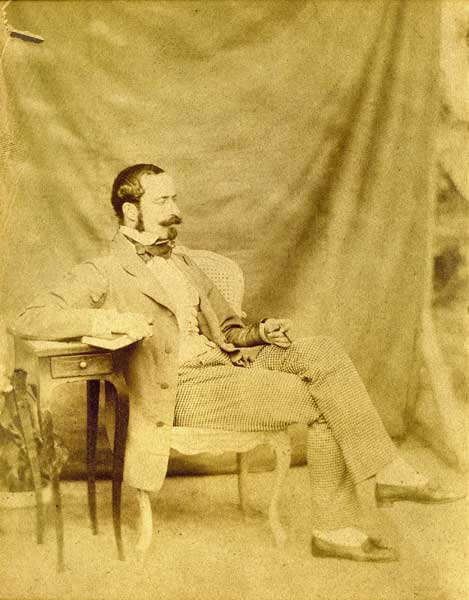
Portrait of Émile Gaillard, 1870

Émile Gaillard was the Parisian representative of a provincial family bank, founded in Grenoble by his grandfather Théodore François Gaillard in the 18th century. His father, Théodore Eugène Gaillard, was Mayor of Grenoble from 1858 to 1865. During his banker career, Émile Gaillard, who was Victor Hugo's banker, also participated in the financing of railway networks and managed the Count of Chambord's wealth. His artistic sensitivity made him one of Chopin's best students, who dedicated one of his mazurkas to him.

Émile Gaillard was a collector, amateur of Middle Ages and Renaissance art. Pieces of furniture, decorative art objects, tapestries and works of art constituted his collection. This collection becoming impossible to hold in his accommodation of Rue Daru in the 8th arrondissement, Gaillard decided to have a mansion built on the Plaine Monceau, in the 17th arrondissement. He asked architect Jules Février to have a neo-Gothic hôtel particulier built for him in 1878.

Gaillard died in 1902. After his death, the family bank was sold to the Crédit Lyonnais.

== The building ==
The mansion is a pastiche of French Renaissance constructions built in the Loire Valley, which aimed at emphasising Gaillard's art collection. Indeed, the architect had visited the Château de Blois and the Château de Gien for sources of inspiration. The magazine La Semaine des constructeurs wrote in 1882: "Mr. Février has been deeply inspired by the Château de Blois, while he still rethought the details, the plan, the facings and the decorations in a very original and personal way".

In 1885, Mr. and Mrs. Gaillard hosted a costumed ball in the famous Ball Room, to which more than 2,000 guests were invited. Émile Gaillard welcomed his guests dressed in a Henri II of France attire. After Émile Gaillard's death, his collection was sold at Hôtel Drouot in 1904.

== Bank of France purchase ==
The building remained empty, until it was sold to the Bank of France in 1919 to become one of its regional office branches (succursales). The rehabilitation works were made by architect Alphonse Defrasse between 1919 and 1921, assisted by interior decorator Jansen. The Hôtel Gaillard was listed a historic monument by a bylaw of 12 April 1999.

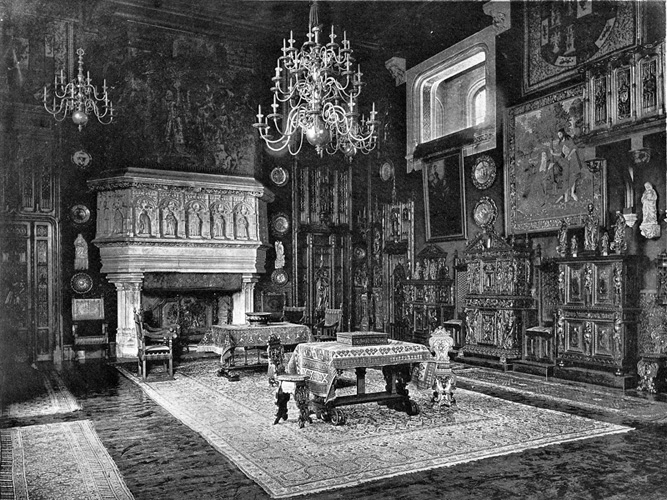
Grand Salon

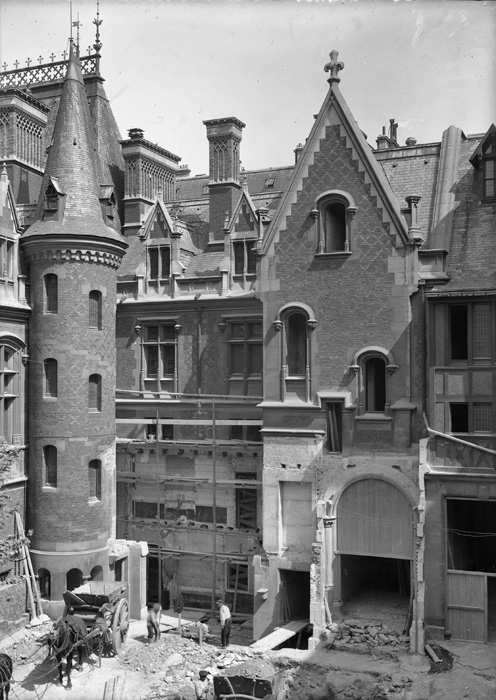
The Hôtel Gaillard courtyard works, 1921

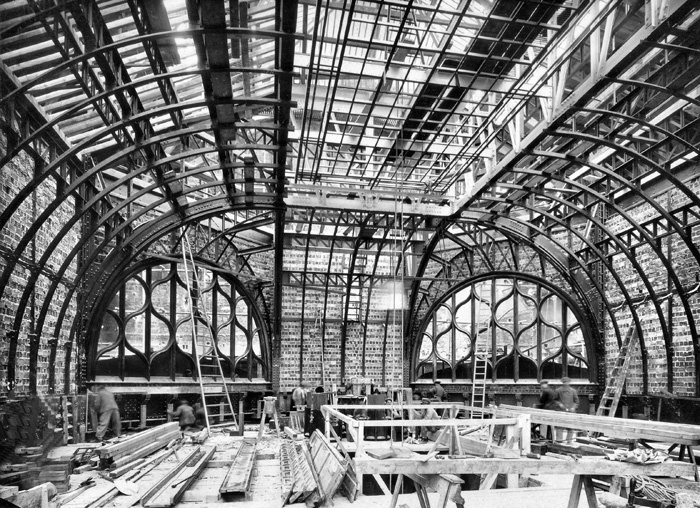
Construction of the Grand Lobby, conceived by the architect Alphonse Defrasse in 1921

== Cité de l'économie et de la monnaie ==
The Bank of France regional office branch closed in 2006 following an internal reorganisation process. In May 2011, the Bank of France announced through a press conference hosted by Governor Christian Noyer the creation of the Cité de l'économie et de la monnaie (Citéco) at the Hôtel Gaillard to serve as a resource for the public's understanding of the economy. The project was due to be completed in late 2014. The winning team designated to carry the project was constituted by Ateliers Lion (Yves Lion) for the architecture part and François Confino for the museography part, assisted by Éric Pallot, who acted as a historic monuments specialist.

Critics pointed out the point of the transformation project. In 2015, Socialist Prime Minister Manuel Valls announced his support for the idea to transform the Hôtel Gaillard in a memorial for slavery, as well as make it an exhibition place for Overseas France (Maison de l'outer-mer) in Paris. After the Bank of France rejected the proposal, the Cité de l'économie et de la monnaie was inaugurated on 15 May 2019 and opened the following 14 June.
