= Jacques-Rose Récamier =

French banker (1751–1830)

- Born: 10 March 1751; Lyon, France
- Died: 29 March 1830 (aged 79); Paris, France
- Occupation: Banker

Jacques-Rose Récamier (10 March 1751 – 29 March 1830) was a French banker. He was also notable as the husband of the salon-leader Juliette Récamier.

== Life ==
The Récamier family originated in Bugey, a region which then specialised in the leather trade and trading with Geneva. Jacques-Rose was the son of François Récamier (1709–1782), who had been born in Belley and owned several hat shops as well as managing a bank in Lyon. Jacques-Rose's mother was Emmeraude Delaroche (1725–1777), daughter of a bookseller and printer from Lyon.

In 1782 he took over the bank founded by his father, and as Jacques Récamier & Cie it nurtured links with high-finance in Geneva, maintained branches in Cádiz and Madrid, and had links with British financiers and trading houses on La Réunion. It was probably involved in trading dollars alongside the French East India Company in the 1780s.

In Lyon on 24 April 1793 Jacques-Rose Récamier married the 15-year-old Jeanne Françoise Julie Adélaïde Bernard, later known as Juliette Récamier. She was the daughter of Julie Matton and Jean Bernard (?–1828), a notary in Lyon who had been made the receiver of finances in Paris in 1784 by Calonne (remaining so until dismissed by Napoleon in 1807). Récamier escaped prison during the Reign of Terror thanks to support from politicians surrounding Cambacérès. In June 1796 he, the Genevan banker Jean-Frédéric Perrégaux and others founded the Caisse des comptes courants, of which Récamier became one of the administrators. He later exchanged his shares in it for shares in the Banque de France, becoming one of the latter's régents on 16 February 1800. At its first shareholders' meeting on 21 April 1800, he took seat 9, holding it until his resignation on 17 October 1806.

On 16 October 1798, Récamier bought two vast properties formerly belonging to Jacques Necker on what was then rue du Mont-Blanc (corresponding to the present-day 7 rue de la Chaussée-d'Antin) for 37383 silver piastres (equivalent to at least 200000 of that era) to avoid the assignat. His wife Juliette gave her first soirées there, "balls whose luxury is extraordinary: the dancers' fans and bouquets are renewed as often as the heat of the dance alters their freshness and, what is more, shoes are provided, by foresight, unnoticed, by fairies, prevents anyone changing from a gavotte to a sauteuse with a sagging shoe, or from leaving the ball like Cinderella". At the end of 1798, he and the banker Alexandre Barrillon founded Syndicat du Commerce, a bank based on rue du Mont-Blanc. Barillon was quite close to him and was his partner in various matters related to the Spanish and Montpellier wool trade - they also both supplied the French army.

Between 1798 and 1806, Récamier became one of the state bankers, an essential pillar of Napoleon I's financial system, but he and his wife were distrusted by Napoleon for their support of figures such as general Moreau and for her salons, which gave rise to the first critics of Napoleon and his policies. In March 1800, Récamier joined the bankers Perregaux, Le Couteulx, Mallet, Barrillon, Germain, Sévène, Bastide, Fulchiron and Doyen in founding the Négociants réunis and advancing over 3 million francs to the Armée d'Italie and the Rhin to cover their campaign expenses, as commissioners of the treasury. From October 1801 to September 1802, the association of "Banquiers du Trésor public" founded by Perregaux, Mallet, Fulchiron, Récamier and Doyen advanced over 30 million francs against the obligations of the receivers general guaranteed by the Caisse d'amortissement.

In 1803 Napoleon ordered her salon closed as part of a massive operation against the conspirators Cadoudal and Pichegru, in which Germaine de Staël was exiled. In November 1805 Récamier's bank had its first setback, revealing a liability for 21 million francs – the banking houses of Louis Bunel, Bastide, Vanlerberghe, Ouvrard and finally Médard Desprez also faced ultimately terminal difficulties between 1806 and 1807. Their bankruptcy was analysed by Louis Bergeron and revealed Récamier's bank tended to take on too many risks and to be over-reliant on international trade, meaning it suffered under the Continental System and Britain's maritime blockade. Récamier resigned as régent of the Banque de France in October 1806 but received no support from his friends there, since his name was linked with opponents of Napoleon's regime. His properties on rue du Mont-Blanc were sold for 400000 francs to the rich grocer François-Dominique Mosselman, who was based in a building opposite Ponceau's on rue Saint-Denis. The couple later moved into a more modest house at 19 rue du Mail. Between 1807 and 1808 his wife refused to enter Napoleon's court and so she and her husband were ordered to leave Paris by the police. He tried to rebuild his fortunes and call in many debts, including debts to the state, but instead, he was declared bankrupt a second time and died without issue in 1830.

== Bibliography ==
- Romuald Szramkiewicz, Les Régents et censeurs de la Banque de France nommés sous le Consulat et l'Empire, coll. « Hautes études médiévales et modernes » n°22, Genève, Droz, 1974 ISBN 978-2600033732.
- Louis Bergeron (1978), Banquiers, négociants et manufacturiers parisiens du Directoire à l’Empire, Éditions EHESS, 1999 ISBN 978-2-7132-1285-7 read online.
