= Martine Delaleuf =

French artist and architect

- Born: Paris, France
- Education: École nationale supérieure des Beaux-Arts
- Occupations: Painter, Architect
- Title: President, French Artists Society
- Term: 2013-2020
- Honours: Chevalier des Arts et des Lettres

Martine Delaleuf (born 1948 in Paris) is a French artist and architect. She graduated from the École nationale supérieure des Beaux-Arts (ENSBA) and holds the title of Chevalier des Arts et des Lettres.

== Artistic career ==
=== Exhibitions ===
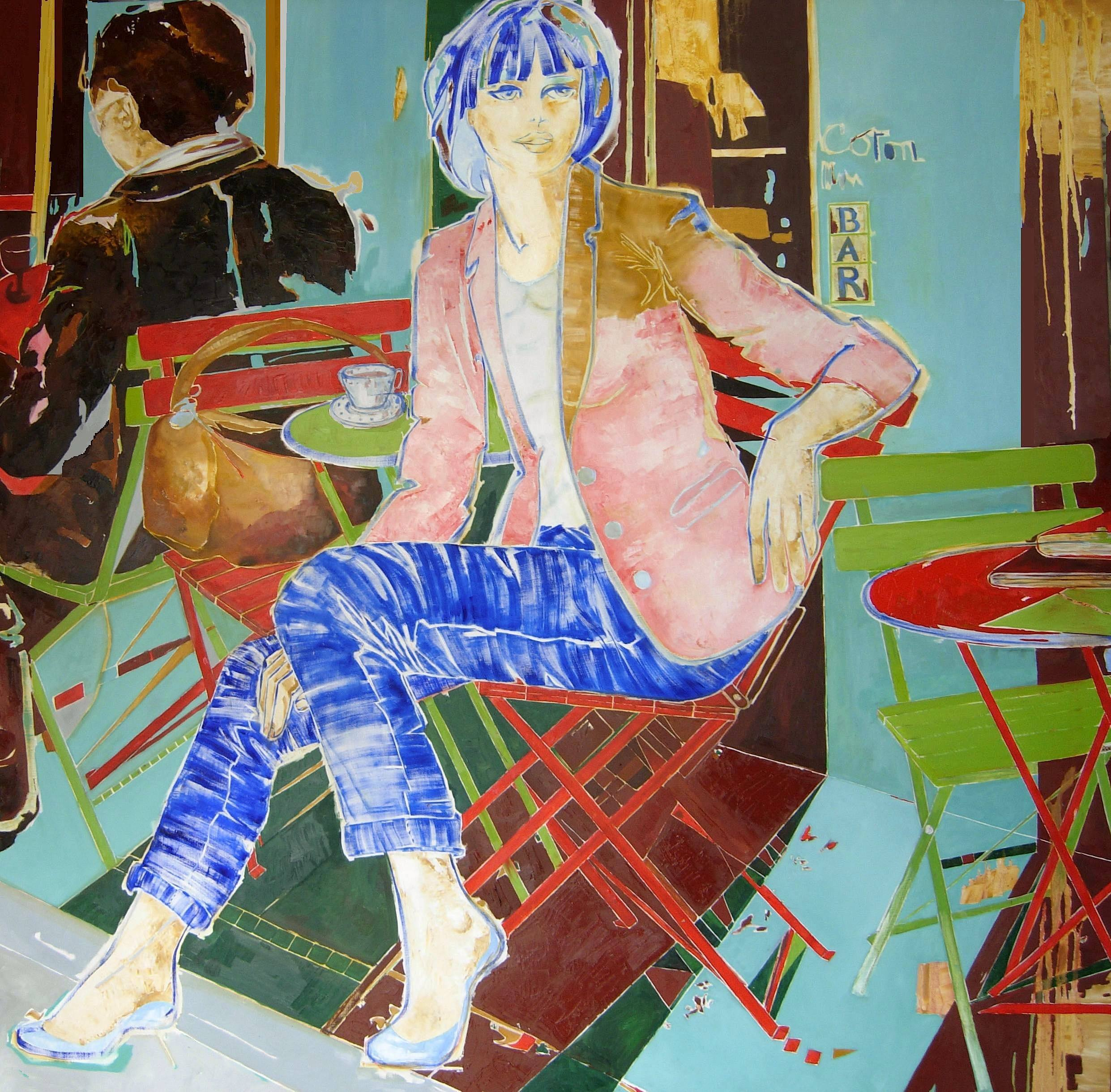
Oil painting on canvas by Delaleuf

Delaleuf's work has been exhibited internationally, including showcases in France, America, Italy, Poland, Japan, China, South Korea, and Syria.

=== Awards and recognition ===
Delaleuf has received a gold medal from the Salon des Artistes français, the Fondation Taylor Award, and the 2002 Academy of Fine Arts Award – Bastien-Lepage Prize – Institut de France. In 2019, she was appointed a Chevalier of the Ordre des Arts et des Lettres. She served as president of the Société des Artistes Français from 2013 to 2020. She received the Salon's Médaille d'Or in 2013. She has been an honorary president of the Société des Artistes Français since 2021.

=== Leadership roles ===
Delaleuf is the Vice President of the Peintre de l'Armée de terre and has been accredited by them as a painter since 2013. She is also a Sociétaire de la Fondation Taylor. Currently, Delaleuf is the President of the Architecture Section of the Salon des Artistes français.

Fond du Plan, 150 x 157 cm. Oil on Canvas by Delaleuf.
