= Société des Artistes Français =

Association under the French law of 1901

Société des Artistes Français (c.1890)

The Société des Artistes Français (French pronunciation: [sɔsjete dez‿aʁtist(ə) fʁɑ̃sɛ], meaning "Society of French Artists") is the association of French painters and sculptors established in 1881. Its annual exhibition is called the "Salon des artistes français" (not to be confused with the better-known Salon, established in 1667).

When the Société was established, it associated all the French artists. Its president was a painter and its vice-president a sculptor. The main task of the Société is to organize the Salon, since the French government ceased to do it.

== Secession ==
In December 1890 president Bouguereau suggested that the Salon should be an exhibition of young, yet unrecognized, artists. Ernest Meissonier, Puvis de Chavannes, Auguste Rodin and others rejected this proposal and left the organization. They quickly created their own exhibition (Société Nationale des Beaux-Arts in 1899) that was also named the Salon, officially Salon de la Société Nationale des Beaux–Arts, in short Salon du Champs de Mars. The original Salon was sometimes called Salon de Champs-Élysées, or simply Salon des artistes français).

== Presidents of the association since 1881 ==
- 1881: Antoine-Nicolas Bailly, architect
- 1891: Leon Bonnat, painter
- 1896: Édouard Detaille, painter
- 1900: Jean-Paul Laurens, painter
- 1901: William Bouguereau, painter
- 1904: Tony Robert-Fleury, painter
- 1907: Henri-Paul Nénot, architect
- 1910: Victor Laloux, architect
- 1913: Antonin Mercie, sculptor
- 1917: Francois Flameng, painter
- 1920: Victor Laloux, architect
- 1922: Jules Coutan, sculptor
- 1924: Henri-Paul Nénot, architect
- 1926: Paul Chabas, painter
- 1936: Alphonse Defrasse, architect
- 1939: Albert Tournaire, architect
- 1941: Henri Bouchard, sculptor
- 1945: Albert Tournaire, architect
- 1947: Jules Formigé, architect
- 1955: Georges Labro, architect
- 1959: Jean-Gabriel Goulinat, painter
- 1965: Georges Cheyssial, painter
- 1977: Georges Muguet, sculptor
- 1979: Paul Ambille, painter
- 1981: Arnaud d'Hauterives, painter
- 1991: Jean-Marie Zacchi, painter
- 1994: Jean Campistron, painter
- 1997: Françoise Zig-Tribouilloy, engraver
- 2000: Christian Billet, painter
- 2010: Viviane Guybet, sculptor
- 2013: Martine Delaleuf, architect

== Present day ==
The Société des Artistes Français still exists and organizes each year the "Salon des Artistes Français". Its current President is Ms. Martine Delaleuf.

== See also ==
- Salon
- Société Nationale des Beaux-Arts
