= Alphonse Defrasse =

French architect (1860–1939)

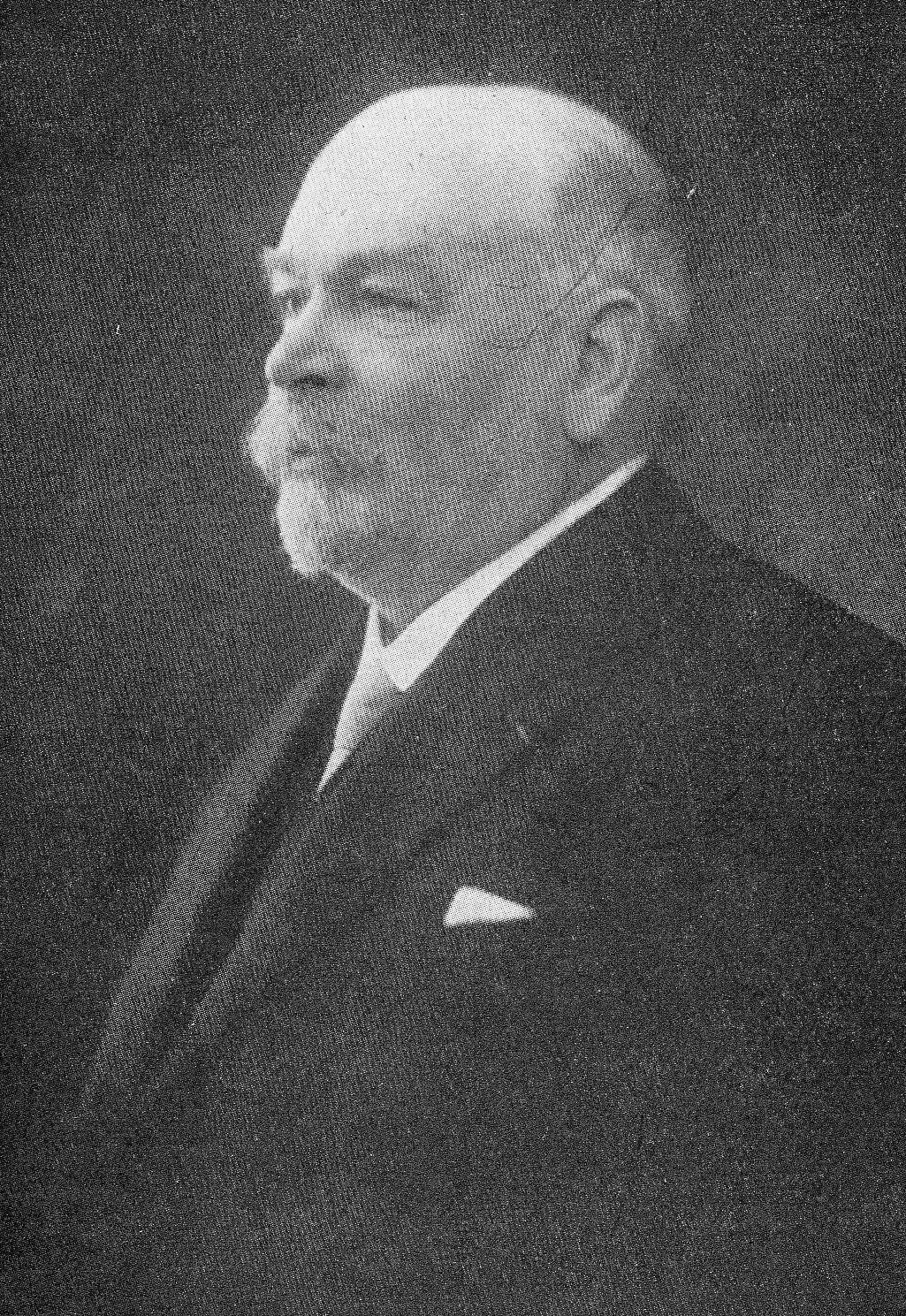
- Alphonse Defrasse (1920s)
- Born: Alphonse Alexandre Defrasse; 30 September 1860; Paris, France
- Died: 18 March 1939 (aged 78); Paris, France
- Education: École Nationale Supérieure des Beaux-Arts
- Occupation: Architect
- Awards: Prix de Rome (1886)
- Practice: Chief Architect, Banque de France (1898–1936)
- Buildings: Standardised plan for Banque de France departmental branches

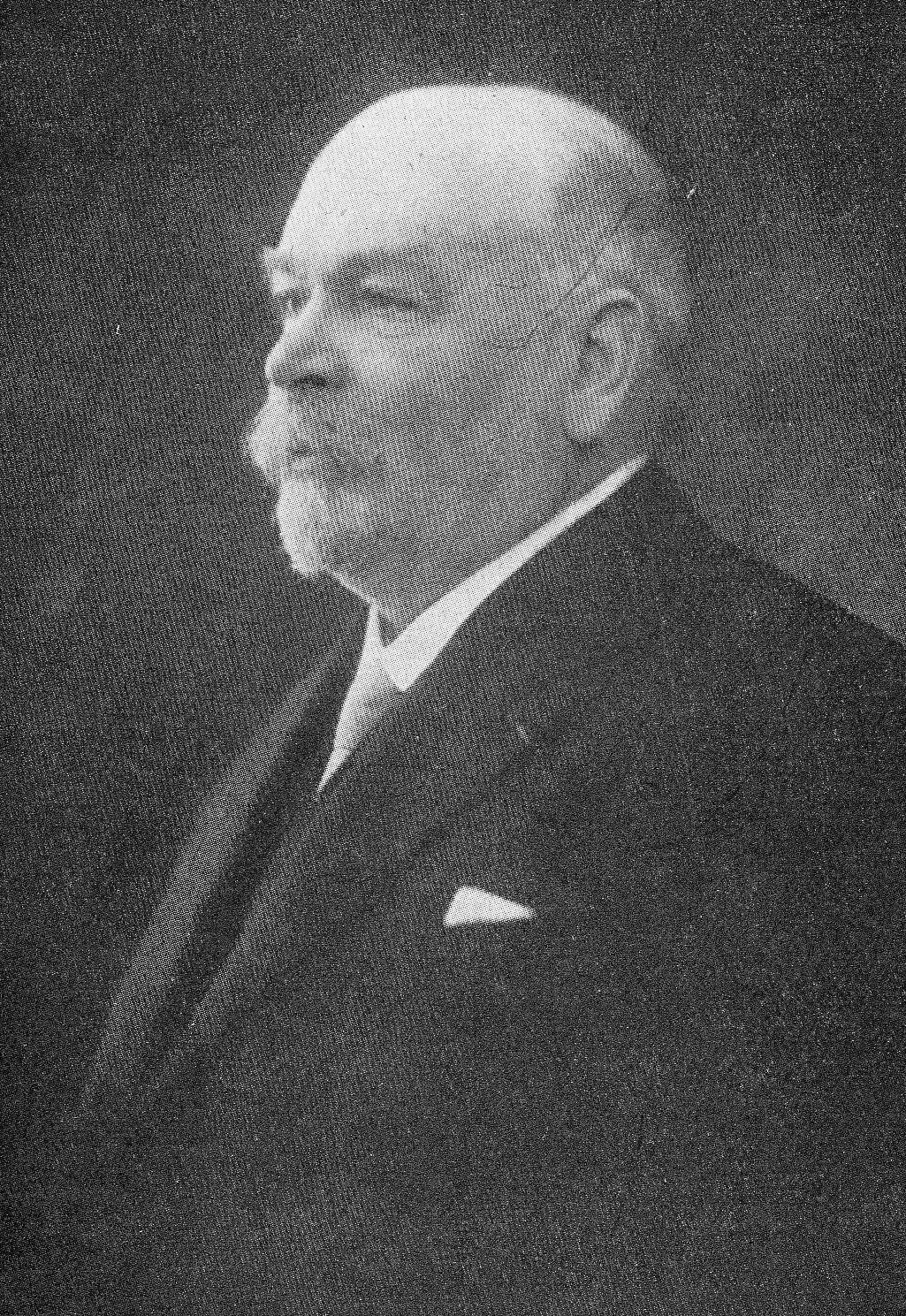
Alphonse Defrasse (1920s)

Alphonse Alexandre Defrasse (30 September 1860, Paris – 18 March 1939, Paris) was a French architect; best known as the Chief Architect for the Banque de France.

== Biography ==
His father was a merchant. He entered the École Nationale Supérieure des Beaux-Arts in 1877, where he was a student of Jules André. His first showing came in 1882, at the Salon des Artistes Français; obtaining a second-class medal. Three years later, his display there earned a travel grant.

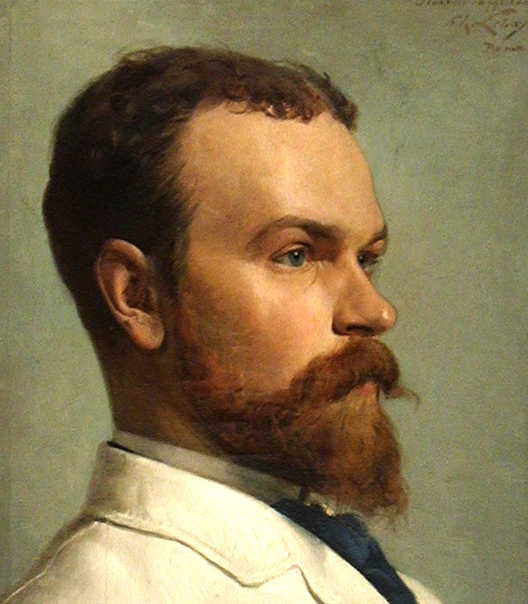
Defrasse in 1890; by Charles Lebayle

He stood for the Prix de Rome three times; winning the Grand Prize in 1886 with a project for the "palace" of the Court of Audit. He was in residence at the Villa Medici from 1887 to 1890. With a stipend from the Académie de France à Rome, he travelled to Greece, where he made studies of various structures at the Sanctuary of Asclepius in Epidaurus. They earned him a medal of honor at the Salon in 1893 then, two years later, were published in a book, with explanatory text by the art historian, Henri Lechat

He briefly served as an Architect of Civil Buildings and National Palaces then, in 1898, was named Chief Architect for the Banque de France; a position he held until his retirement in 1936. In response to a law of 1897, requiring the Banque to have a branch in the capital city of every Department, his first major project involved creating a standard plan for those branches, which was utilized over twenty times. During his years with the Banque, he also executed a few private commissions for mansions, in and around Paris.

He was awarded a Grand Prize at the Exposition Universelle of 1900, for his layout of the inner courtyard at the Petit Palais. From 1906, he directed a free workshop at the École. In 1928, he was elected to the Académie des Beaux-Arts, where he took Seat #2 for architecture; succeeding Alexandre Marcel (deceased).

In his later years, his projects included new facilities for the interior of the Hotel Gaillard (1921), underground rooms at the Banque's headquarters (1925–27), and work on the hospital in Juvisy-sur-Orge (1932). A collection of his plans for projects that were never realized is being preserved by the Musée d'Orsay

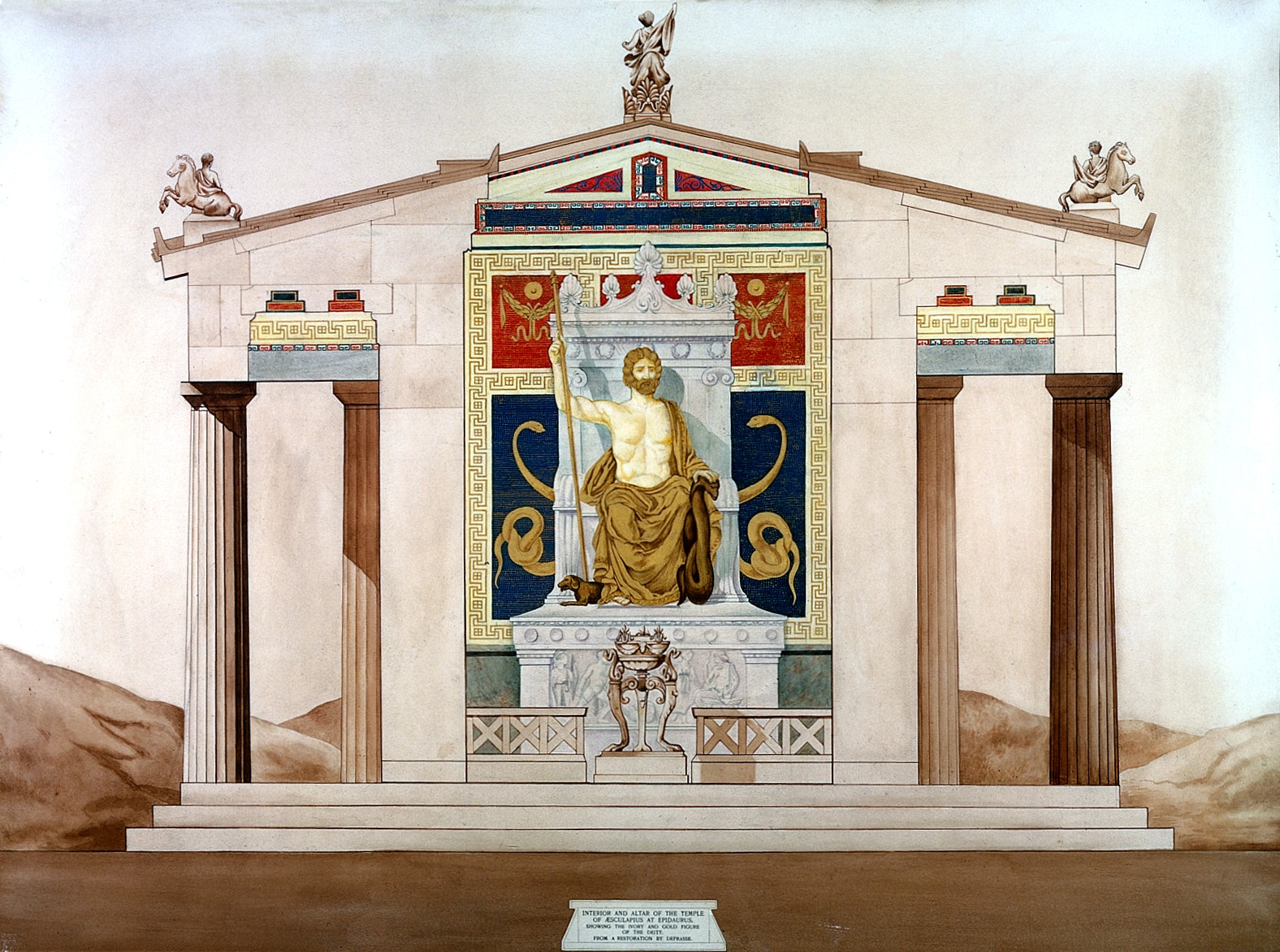
The altar and statue at the Temple of Asclepius (a reconstruction)
