= Jean-Frédéric Perregaux =

Neuchâtel banker

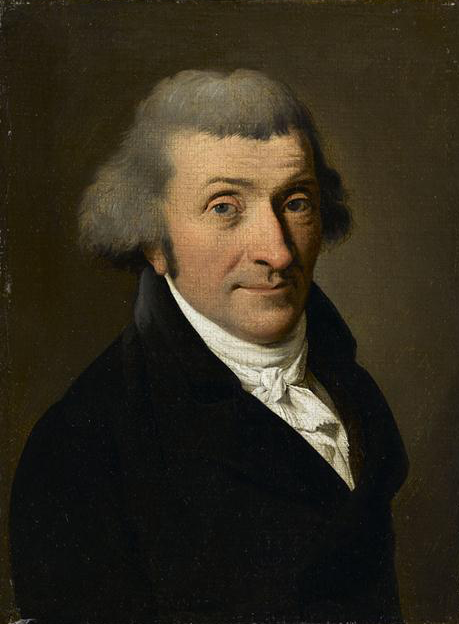

Jean-Frédéric Perregaux (1744–1808) was a banker from Neuchâtel (now in Switzerland).
