= Patrick Devedjian =

French politician (1944–2020)

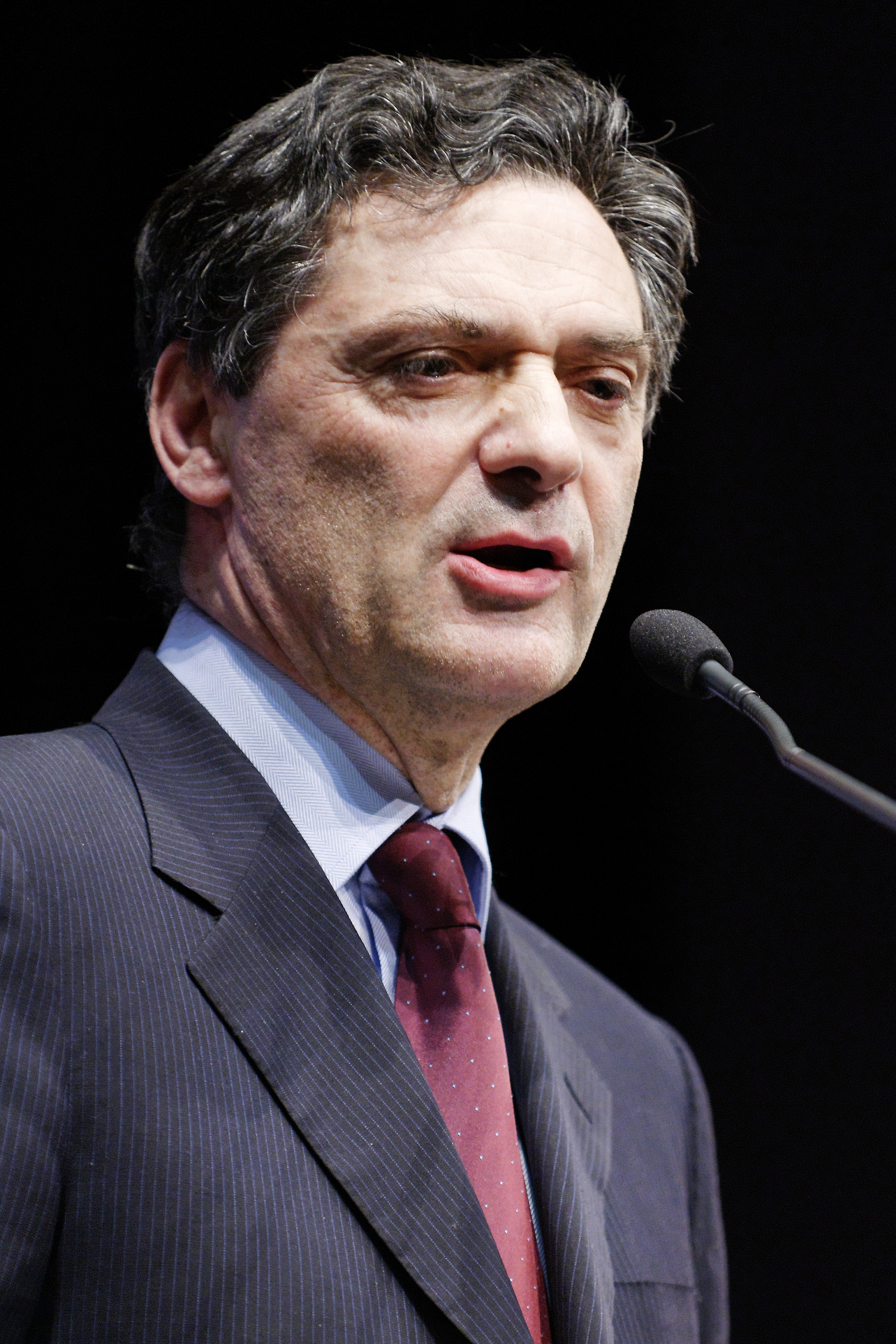
- Devedjian in 2010

President of the General Council of Hauts-de-Seine
- In office 1 June 2007 – 28 March 2020
- Preceded by: Nicolas Sarkozy
- Succeeded by: Georges Siffredi (interim)

Member of the National Assembly for Hauts-de-Seine's 13th constituency
- In office 2010–2017
- Preceded by: Georges Siffredi
- Succeeded by: Frédérique Dumas

Mayor of Antony
- In office 1983–2002
- Preceded by: André Aubry
- Succeeded by: Raymond Sibille

Minister under the Prime Minister in charge of the Implementation of the Recovery Plan
- In office 5 December 2008 – 13 November 2010
- President: Nicolas Sarkozy
- Prime Minister: François Fillon

Personal details
- Born: 26 August 1944 Fontainebleau, France
- Died: 28 March 2020 (aged 75) Antony, France
- Cause of death: COVID-19
- Party: The Republicans
- Education: Lycée Condorcet
- Alma mater: Panthéon-Assas University
- Profession: Lawyer
- Awards: Order of Makarios III, Order of Honor (Armenia)

Patrick Devedjian (French: [patʁik dəvɛdʒjɑ̃]; 26 August 1944 – 28 March 2020) was a French politician of the Union for a Popular Movement (UMP) party. A close adviser of Nicolas Sarkozy since the 1990s, he was Minister under the Prime Minister in charge of the Implementation of the Recovery Plan, a special ministerial post created for two years after the 2008 financial crisis, a tenure which commenced in December 2008. He was of Armenian descent. On 28 March 2020, he died of complications from COVID-19 during the COVID-19 pandemic.

== Youth ==
Devedjian was born in Fontainebleau, Seine-et-Marne. He was the grandson of the Armenian zoologist and Ottoman bureaucrat Karekin Deveciyan. His father was born in Sivas, Ottoman Empire and arrived in France after the First World War. Devedjian received his early education in an Armenian school in Sèvres. He continued his education at the Panthéon-Assas University. He joined the far-right group Occident in 1963, at the age of 17. In a 2014 interview, he stated he regretted his past membership in the organization, and that he had "never condoned any crime". He was admitted to the Paris Bar in 1970. He became a militant in the Gaullist movement in 1971 and took part in the foundation of the Rally for the Republic (RPR) party in 1976.

== Career ==
=== Mayor of Antony and Deputy ===
In 1983, Devedjian was elected Mayor of Antony, a position he would hold until 2002 with re-elections in 1989, 1995 and 2001. In 1986, he also became a Deputy in the National Assembly from the Hauts-de-Seine department and was re-elected six times in 1988, 1993, 1997, 2002, 2007 and 2012. He was a member of the Assembly Committee on Finance and was rapporteur of the General Agreement on Tariffs and Trade Committee.

In 1992, he was one of the few members of the RPR who voted to support the Maastricht Treaty. During the 1995 presidential campaign, he supported Édouard Balladur together with Nicolas Sarkozy, and suffered unpopularity with the RPR after Balladur's defeat against Jacques Chirac. He became a close adviser to Nicolas Sarkozy and came back into favour during the presidential campaign of 2002.

=== Second Chirac presidency ===
After Jacques Chirac’s reelection in 2002, Nicolas Sarkozy, who became Minister of the Interior and de facto Number 2 of Jean-Pierre Raffarin's government, chose Patrick Devedjian to be his Deputy Minister for Local Liberties, in charge of local government. As President Chirac had requested that ministers did not carry local executive powers, Devedjian resigned as Mayor of Antony and was succeeded by Raymond Sibille. He was also replaced in Parliament by his substitute Georges Siffredi.

When Nicolas Sarkozy became Minister of the Economy and Finance in 2004, Patrick Devedjian followed him as Deputy Minister for Industry.

In June 2005, new Prime Minister Dominique de Villepin did not include Patrick Devedjian in his government. As a result, Georges Siffredi resigned from Parliament in October in order for Devedjian to be reelected in the Hauts-de-Seine 13th constituency.

Devedjian proposed an amendment to a proposed bill penalizing denial of the Armenian Genocide on 9 October 2006 that read, "These regulations do not apply to academic and scientific researches and studies." Devedjian added a statement to the amendment that according to media would "prevent any provocations and political demonstrations organized by a foreign country."

When Nicolas Sarkozy resigned from Government and became President of the Union for a Popular Movement party, Patrick Devedjian became his political advisor.

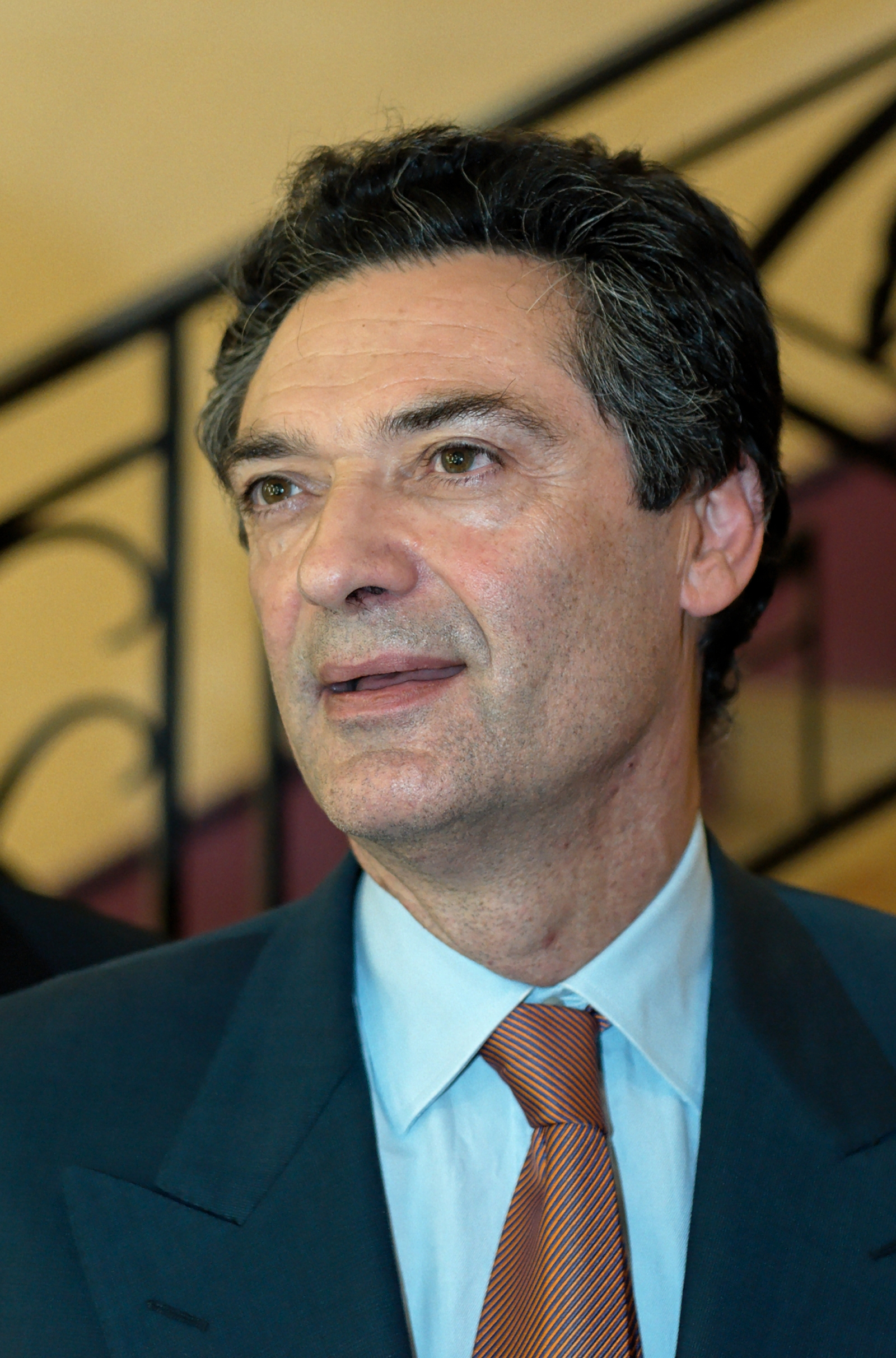
Patrick Devedjian answering journalists after a political rally in 2007

=== 2007 elections ===
After the 2007 presidential election and Nicolas Sarkozy’s election as President of the Republic, tensions appeared between Sarkozy and Devedjian, who had wished and been predicted to become Minister of Justice. Instead, Sarkozy chose Rachida Dati, the first woman of Northern African ancestry to hold a Ministry in France. Devedjian was not included in François Fillon’s government. On that occasion, Devedjian bitterly remarked: "I am in favour of a government open to a wide range of people—even to Sarkozists." The joke earned him the 2007 Prize for Political Humour.

Instead, Devedjian took the presidency of the Hauts-de-Seine General Council on 1 June, becoming head of the richest département in France. He was also named Deputy Secretary-General of the Union for a Popular Movement (UMP), replacing Brice Hortefeux, then Secretary-General on 25 September, sharing the party leadership with First Vice President Jean-Pierre Raffarin.

=== Return to government ===
From 8 December 2008 to 13 November 2010, Devedjian was appointed Minister under the Prime Minister in charge of the Implementation of the Recovery Plan, a special ministerial post created for two years after the 2008 financial crisis and the announcement of a recovery package by President Sarkozy on 4 December. He left the UMP leadership to Xavier Bertrand on 8 December.

=== Political career ===
Governmental functions

Minister of Economic Recovery Plan: 2008–2010.

Minister of Industry: 2004–2005

Minister of Local Liberties: 2002–2004

Electoral mandates

National Assembly of France

Member of the National Assembly of France for Hauts-de-Seine (13th constituency): 1986–2002 (Became minister in 2002) / 2005–2008 (Became minister in 2008) / 2010–2017. Elected in 1986, reelected in 1988, 1993, 1997, 2002, 2005 (by-election), 2007 and 2012.

General Council

President of the Hauts-de-Seine General Council: 2007–2020 (Replacement after the resignation of Nicolas Sarkozy, who became president of the French Republic)

Vice-president of Hauts-de-Seine General Council: 2004–2007.

Hauts-de-Seine general councillor: 2004–2020.

Municipal Council

Mayor of Antony, Hauts-de-Seine: 1983–2002 (Resignation). Elected in 1983, reelected in 1989, 1995, 2001.

Deputy-mayor of Antony, Hauts-de-Seine: 2002–2005 (Resignation).

Municipal councillor of Antony, Hauts-de-Seine: 1983–2005. (Resignation)

Agglomeration community Council

President of the Agglomeration community of Hauts de Bièvre: 2002–2005 (Resignation).

Member of the Agglomeration community of Hauts de Bièvre: 2002–2008.

Political functions

General Secretary of the Union for a Popular Movement: 2007–2008.

Spokesman of the Rally for the Republic: 1999–2001.

== Controversies ==
After the 2007 legislative elections, Télé Lyon Métropole (TLM) filmed a conversation during which a UMP Deputy of Bouches-du-Rhône introduced new MP Michel Havard to Patrick Devedjian, saying that Havard had beaten Democratic Movement candidate Anne-Marie Comparini. Devedjian congratulated Havard and then added "… cette salope !" ("… that bitch!") about Comparini. That evening, Devedjian apologized in private, then issued a press release deploring the broadcast of "stolen images of a private conversation". He said he regretted his "inappropriate exclamation about Mrs. Anne-Marie Comparini" and said, "he sent her his regards and esteem". He apologized again in public at a press conference the next day, but it was too late to forestall a storm of criticism. The president of TLM said that Devedjian had asked for the interview not to be broadcast "but Mr. Devedjian knew he was being filmed".
