= Noli turbare circulos meos! =

Latin phrase meaning "Do not disturb my circles!"

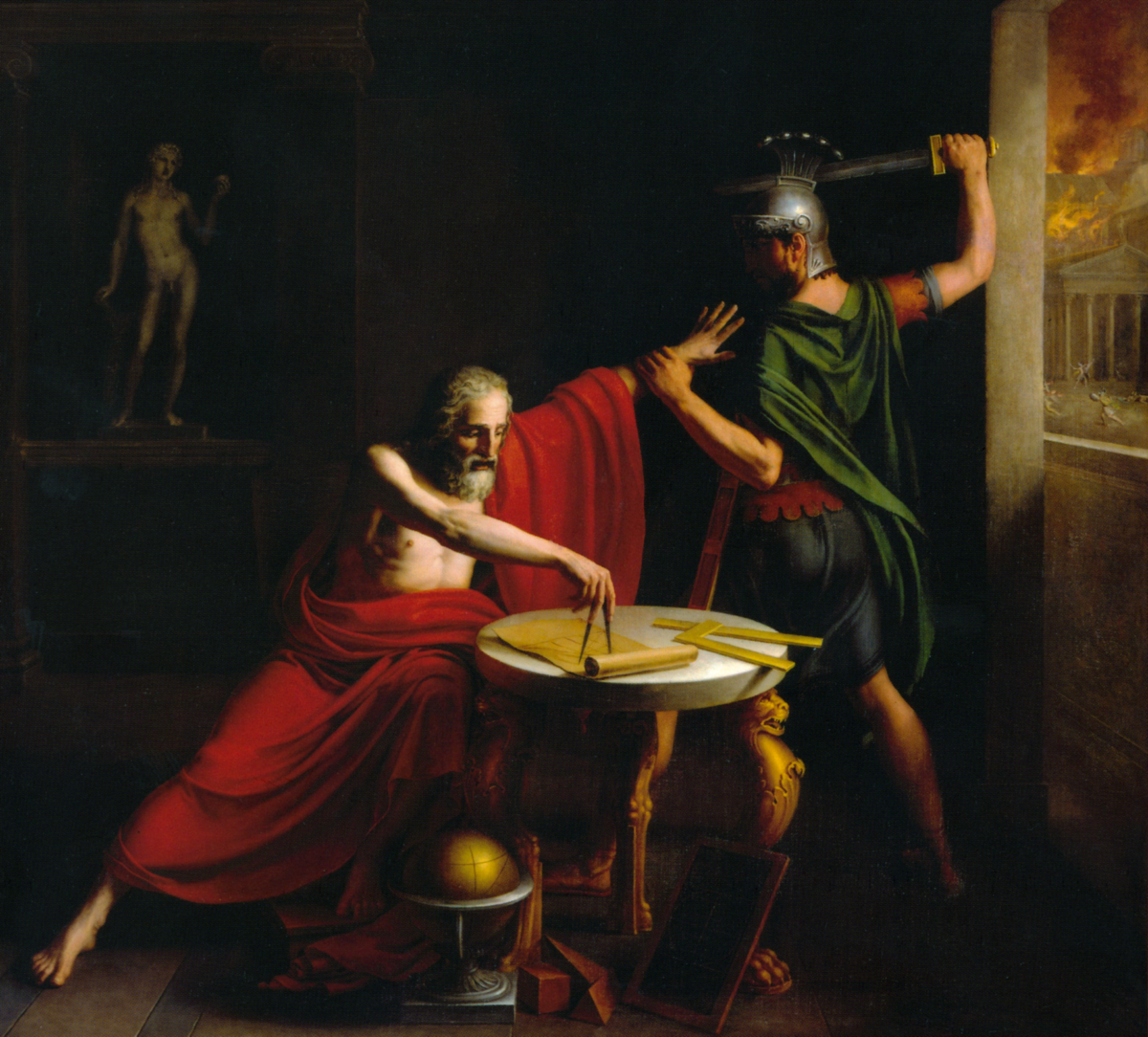
Death of Archimedes, an 1815 painting by Thomas Degeorge. It depicts a mechanical drawing on a roll instead of sand.

"Nōlī turbāre circulōs meōs!" is a Latin phrase, meaning "Do not disturb my circles!" It is said to have been uttered by Archimedes—in reference to a geometric figure he had outlined on the sand—as he was about to be killed by a Roman soldier during the Siege of Syracuse.

== Origin ==
According to Valerius Maximus, the phrase was uttered by the ancient Greek mathematician and astronomer Archimedes. When the Romans conquered the city of Syracuse after the siege of 214–212 BC, the Roman general Marcus Claudius Marcellus gave the order to retrieve Archimedes. Some soldiers entered the house of Archimedes and one of the soldiers asked Archimedes who he was. But, according to Valerius Maximus (Facta et dicta memorabilia, Book VIII.7), Archimedes just answered "Noli, obsecro, istum disturbare" ("Do not, I entreat you, disturb that [sand]"), because he was so engrossed in the circles drawn on the sand in front of him. After that, one of the soldiers killed Archimedes, despite the order of Marcus Claudius Marcellus.

== Authenticity ==
Plutarch does not mention the quote in his Parallel Lives. Valerius Maximus (Facta et dicta memorabilia, Book VIII.7) attests the Latin form "noli ... istum disturbare" ("I ask you not to disturb that sand"). Valerius's is the only version of the phrase that survives from antiquity. In the modern era, it was paraphrased as "Noli turbare circulos meos" and then translated to Katharevousa Greek as "μὴ μου τοὺς κύκλους τάραττε!" ("Mē mou tous kuklous taratte!").
