= Thomas Degeorge =

French painter

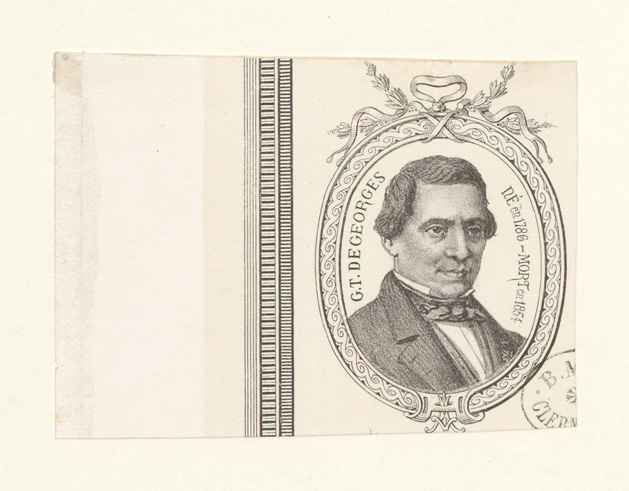
- Born: Christophe Thomas Degeorge; October 8, 1786; Blanzat, Province of Auvergne, Kingdom of France
- Died: November 21, 1854 (aged 68); Clermont-Ferrand, Puy-de-Dôme, Second French Empire
- Education: Jacques-Louis David
- Occupation: Painter
- Parents: Anne-François Degeorge; Gilberte Vigeral
- Relatives: Guillaume Degeorge (brother)

Thomas Degeorge (1786–1854) was a French neoclassical painter. The Musée d'Art Roger-Quilliot in the Clermont Auvergne Métropole contains several of Degeorge's works.

== Biography ==
Christophe Thomas Degeorge was born the son of lawyer Annet François Degeorge, who later became justice of the peace of Clermont-Ferrand (1831–1841), and Gilberte Vigeral, daughter of a notaire from Vertaizon His brother Guillaume Degeorge (1787–1868) was an architect in Clermont-Ferrand and built the cour d'appel at Riom. From childhood he showed an interest in drawing. At the age of 8, he studied under a reputed master of art in Clermont, Pierre-Marie Gault de Saint-Germain; at 12, he was capable of meticulously made, life-like portraits and at 16, he joined the school of Jacques-Louis David.

Gaspard de Chabrol, préfet of Seine, entrusted him with creating several tableaux for the churches of Paris: L'ensevelissement du Christ (The Entombment of Christ, at Saint-Jacques-du-Haut-Pas), Le martyre de saint Jacques le mineur (The Martyrdom of Saint James the Lesser) and a Le Christ à la colonne (Christ at the Column). He painted frescos of allegorical figures for the salle des audiences ('hearings room') of the Tribunal de commerce de Paris and aided Auguste Vinchon with the frescos for the chapel of Saint Maurice at the church of Saint-Sulpice. Possibly due to illness, he failed to win the Prix de Rome scholarship.

Sometime before the July Revolution of 1830, he began La mort de Bonchamps, by personal choice rather than for a commission; it was mentioned in a letter of 1828. After the events of the revolution, however, the subject was no longer considered appropriate, so he interrupted the work. It was only in 1837 that he could present the piece for exhibition at the Louvre, where the count of Montalivet, Minister of the Interior in the government of "citizen-king" Louis Philippe I refused to submit it to the jury for fear of exciting political passions. Appreciating the artistry, however, Montalivet bought the work a little later in the name of the state and offered it to the town of Clermont-Ferrand and, in return, commissioned Degorge to create Le Christ au jardin des Oliviers (Christ in Gethsemane) for the parish church of Notre-Dame de Sancerre.

Around this time, Degeorge left Paris to return to Clermont-Ferrand; while there, he created several portraits of local figures, such as François Dominique de Reynaud, Comte de Montlosier; Clermont mayor Antoine Blatin; Jean Grenier, first president of the Riom appellate court; and general Nicolas Léonard Beker. He also painted rural figures such as le Faucheur ('scyther') and la Petite Glaneuse ('the young gatherer'). He was named a member of the Academy of Sciences, Belle-Lettres and Arts of Clermont-Ferrand. he was created a chevalier in the Légion d'honneur in 1854.

He married Antoinette Jeanne Delmas de Grammont who, after his death, passed the contents of his atelier to the city, making up around 60 paintings and 2 sketchbooks, which are kept now at the museum.

== Works ==
- Christ à la colonne, Paris: Armenian Cathedral of the Holy Cross of Paris.
- Portrait de Chateaubriand, Châtenay-Malabry: Vallée-aux-Loups.
- L'envahissement de l'Assemblée le 1^{er} Prairial (The invasion of the Assembly on the 1st of Prairial), 1831
- Several paintings, sketches and studies at the Musée d'Art Roger-Quilliot in Clermont-Ferrand, including:
  - Mort de Bonchamps, esquisse, études (1837)
  - Portrait de Madame Degeorge (1838)
  - Portrait de Madame Delaval (1838), showing Louise-Marie de Laval, spouse of baron Anne-Marie-Mathias Camille Delaval.
  - Portrait d'Antoine Blatin (1846)
  - La Petite Glaneuse (1824)
  - Le Faucheur et la jeune fille
  - Diagoras porté en triomphe par ses fils à Olympie
- Mort de Bonchamps, Departmental museum of the Vendée.
- Le Christ au jardin des Oliviers (1841), Notre-Dame de Sancerre
  - Another tableau on the same theme in the church of Saint-Julien-de-Coppel in Puy-de-Dôme.
- Le baron Grenier, Riom, Palais de justice
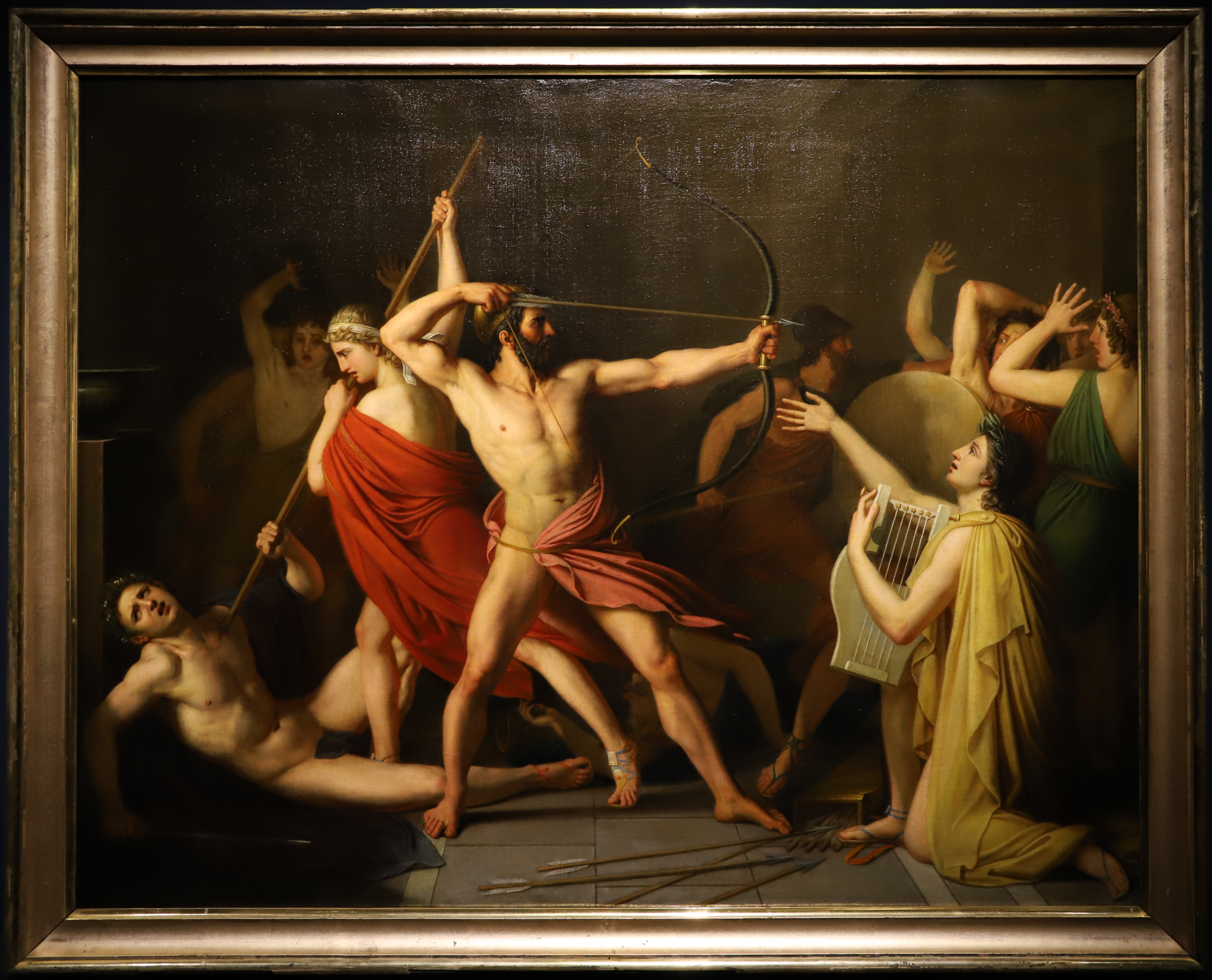
Ulysse et Télémaque tuent les prétendants (Ulysses and Telemachus slaughter the suitors), 1812

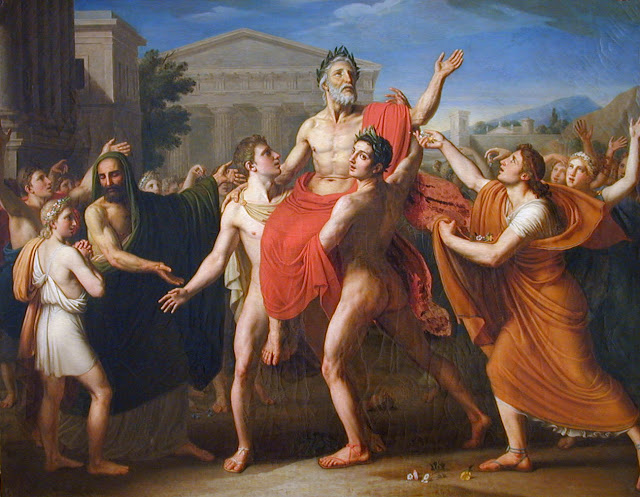
Diagoras porté en triomphe par ses fils à Olympie (Diagoras of Rhodes, carried in triumph by his sons at Olympia), 1814

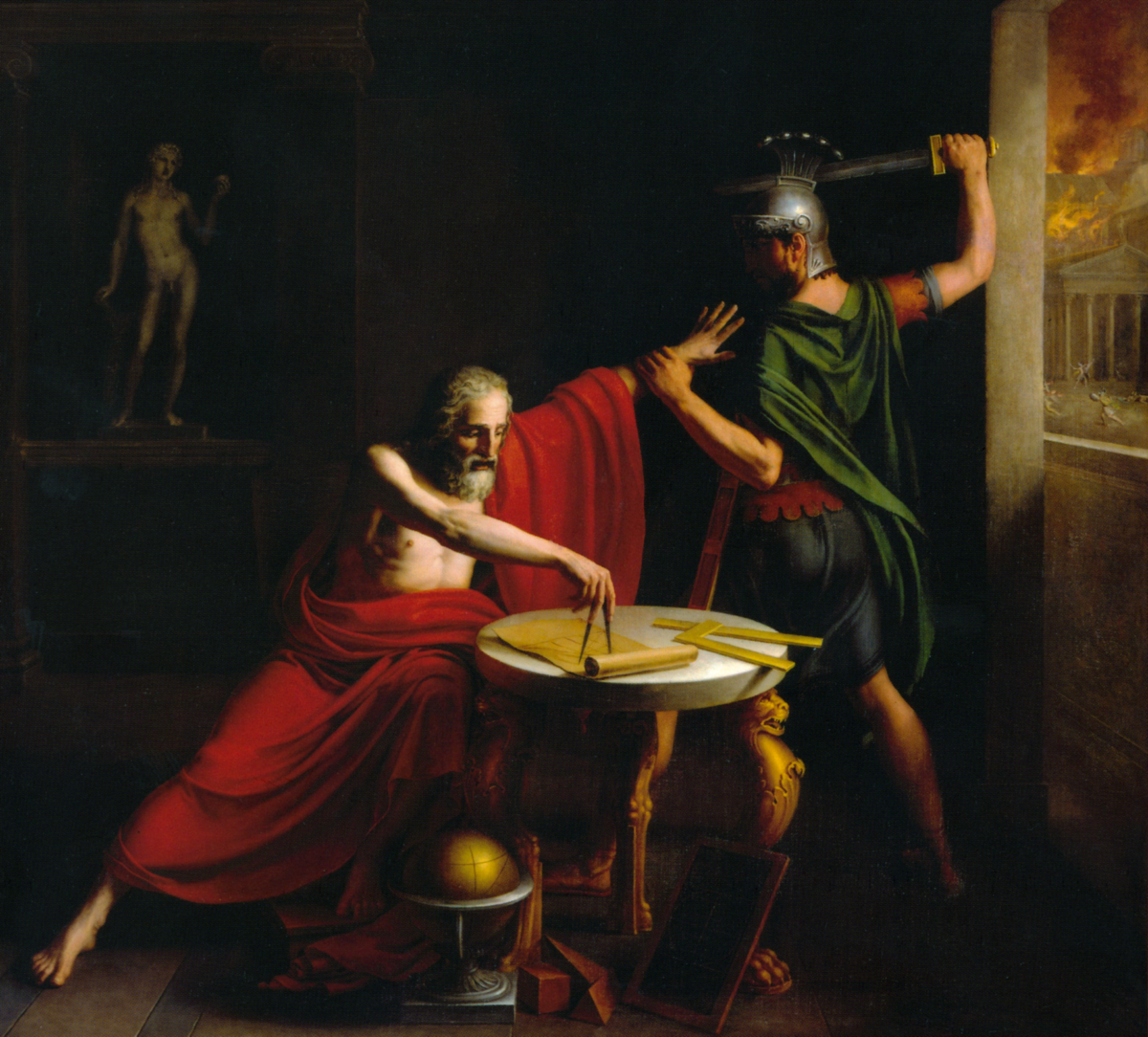
La mort d'Archimède (Death of Archimedes), 1815

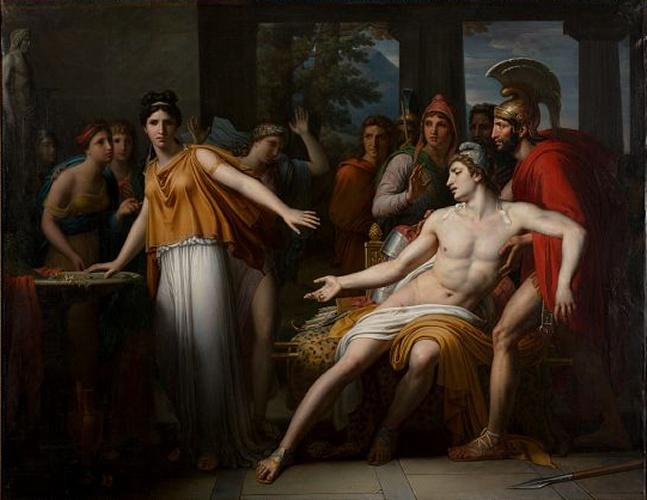
Œnone refuse de guérir Pâris (Oenone refuses to heal Paris), 1816

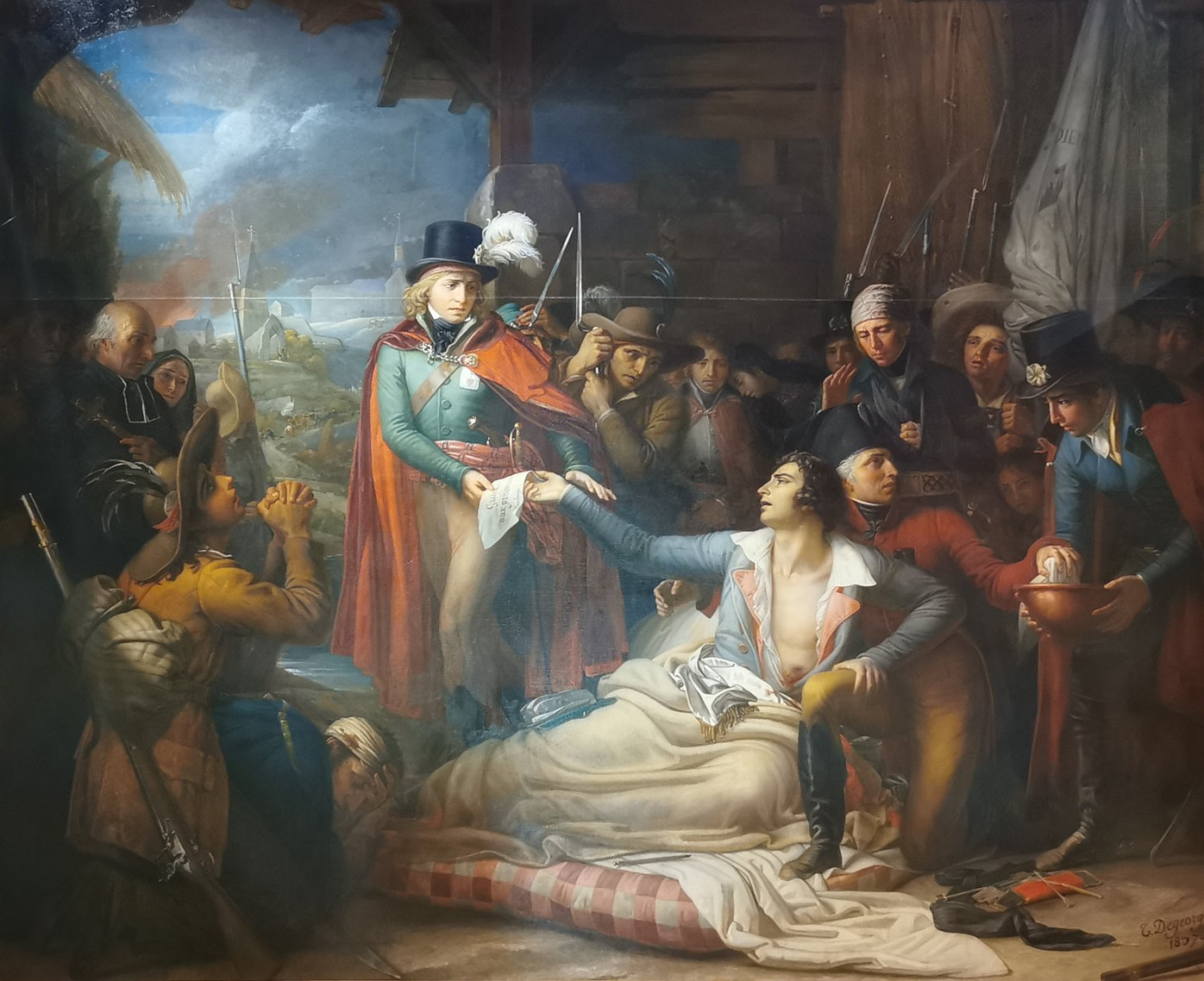
La mort de Bonchamps (Death of Bonchamps), 1837

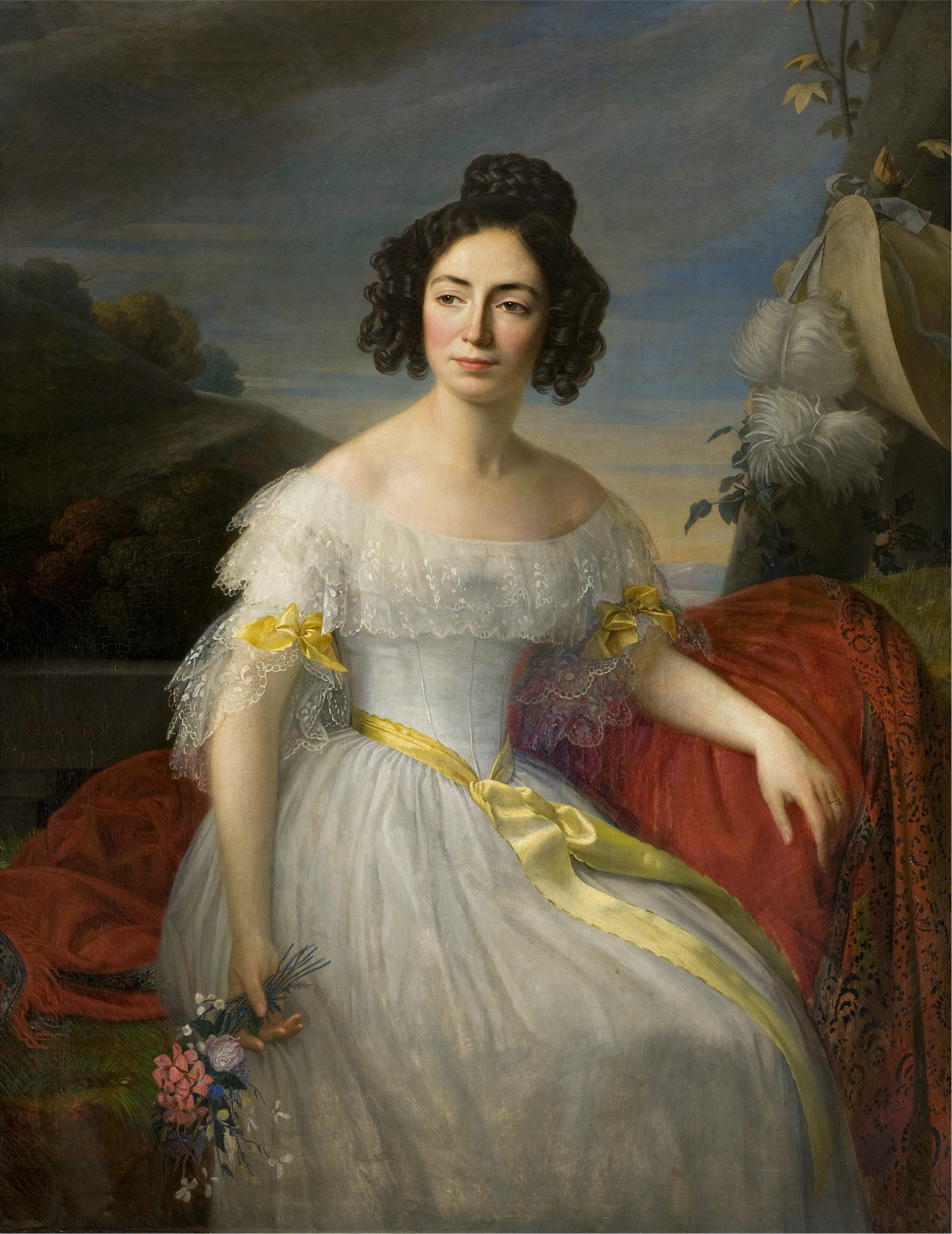
Portrait de Madame Degeorge (1838)

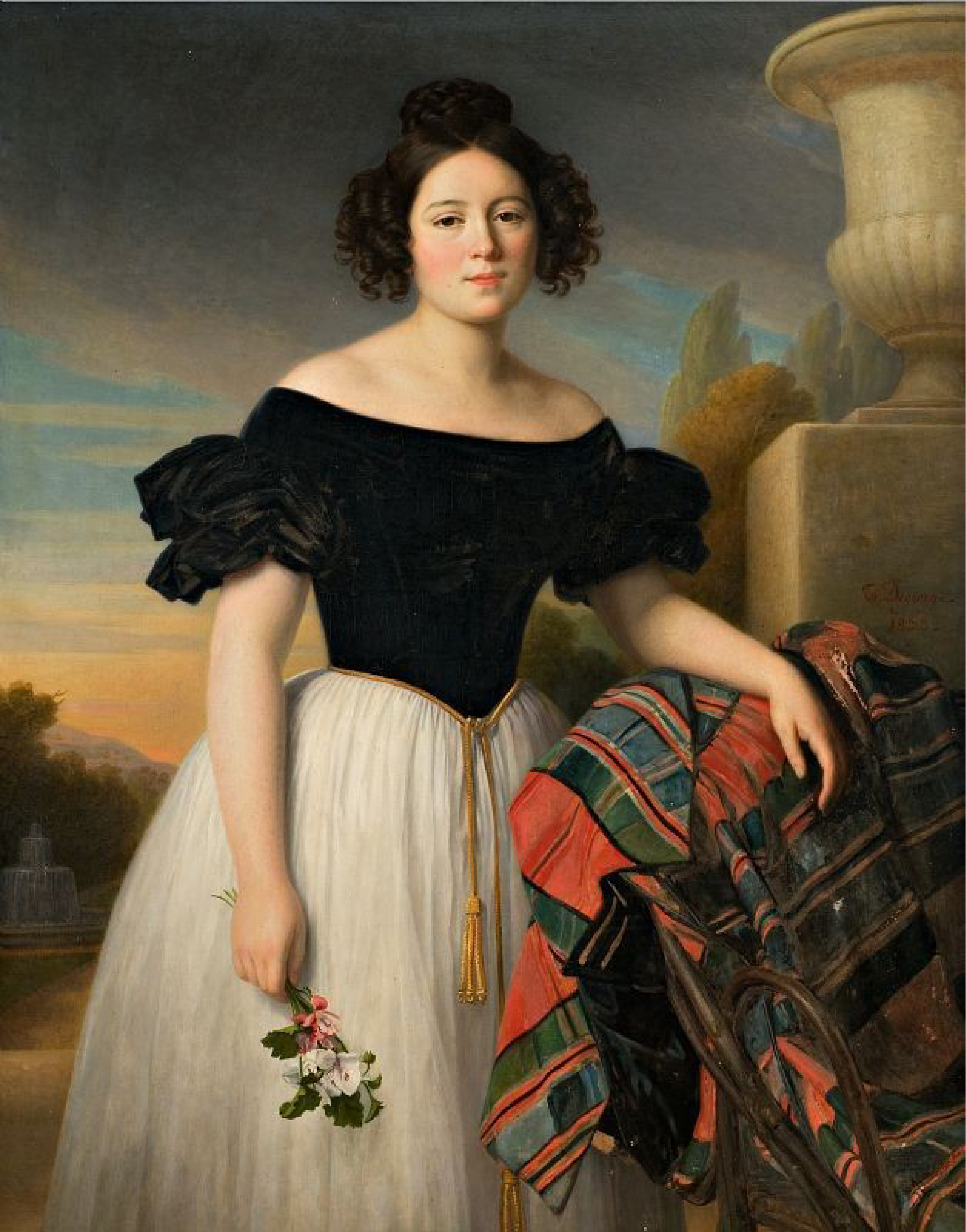
Portrait de Madame Delaval, 1838

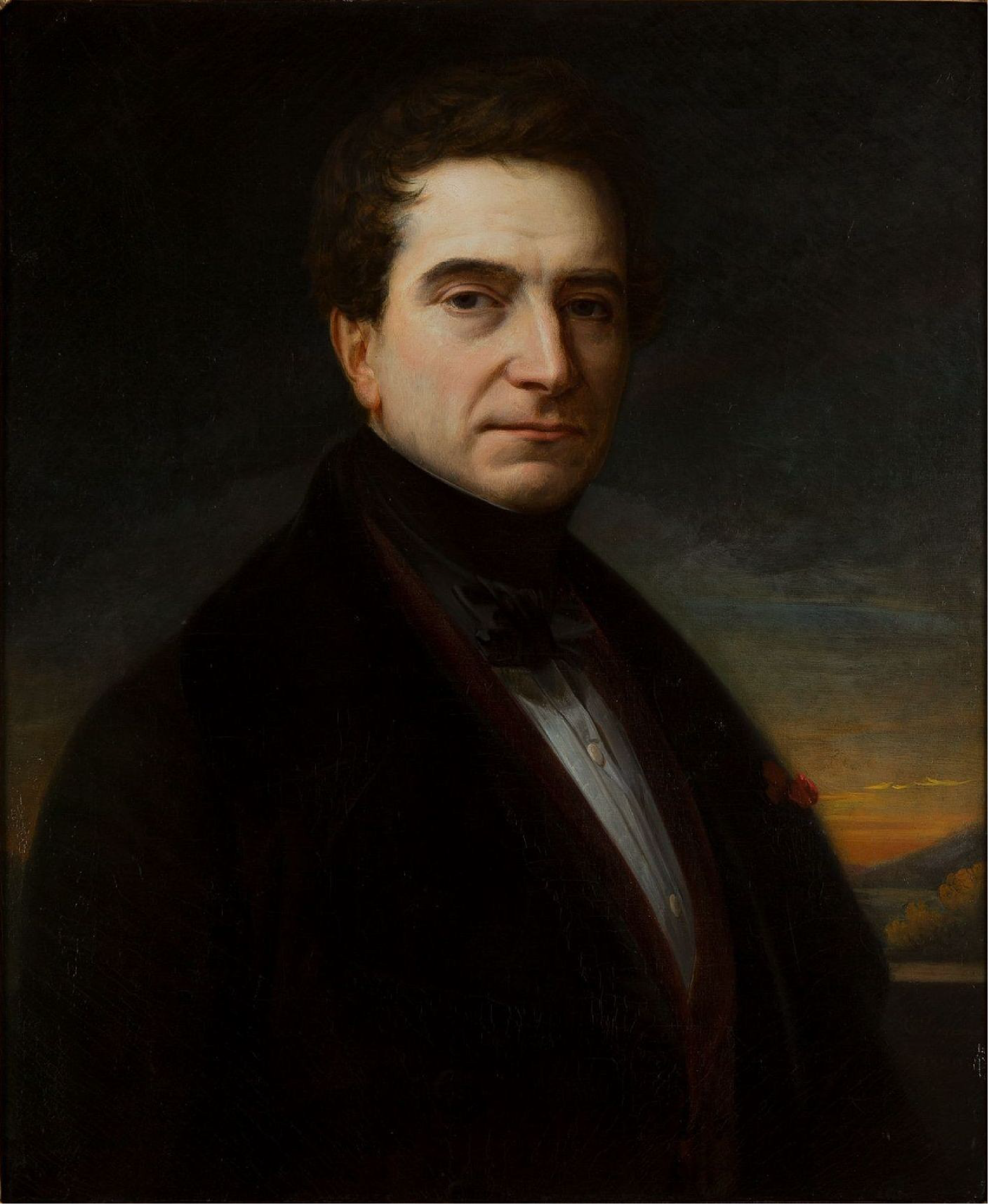
Autoportrait, 1839

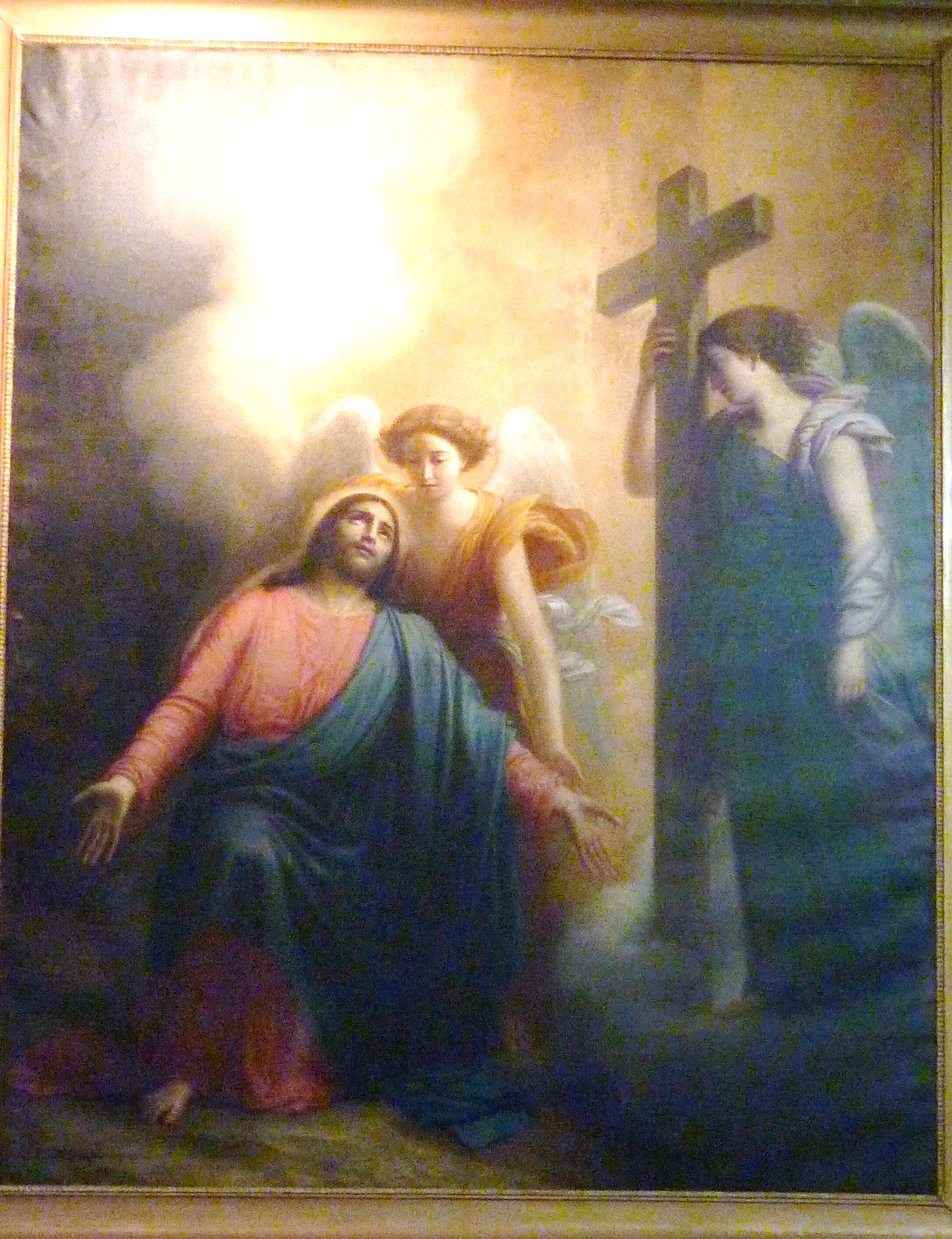
Le Christ au jardin des Oliviers (Christ in Gethsemane), 1841

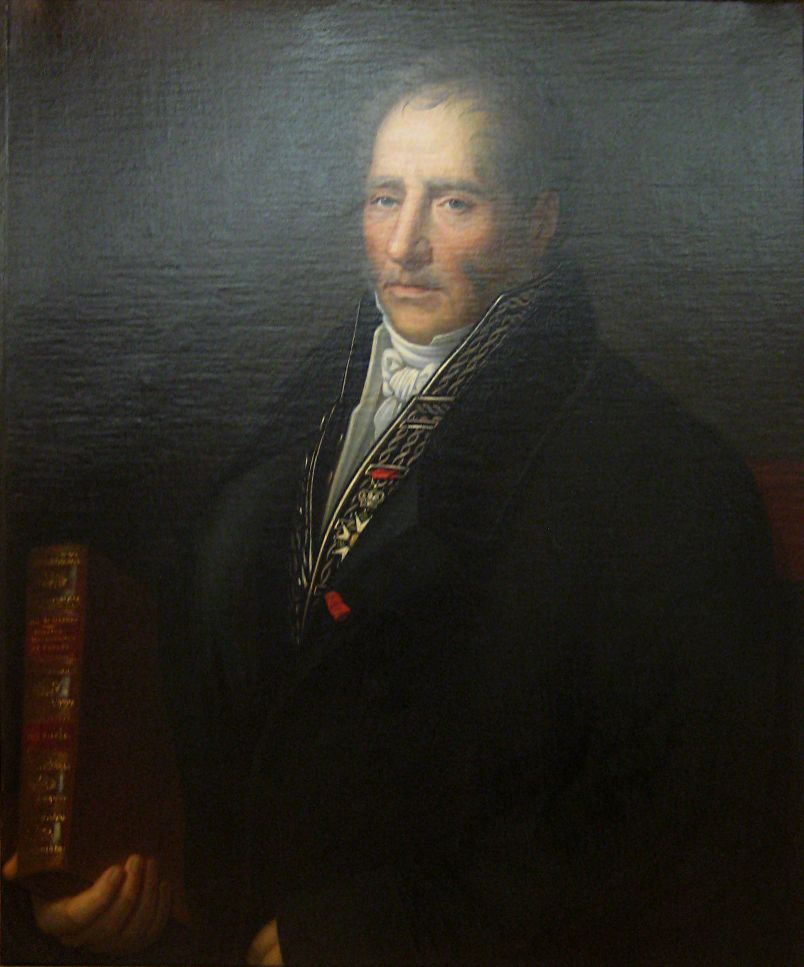
Portrait d'Antoine Blatin, 1846

== Bibliography ==
- Conchon, Hippolyte (1855). "Éloge biographique de Degeorge, membre de l'Académie de Clermont". Annales scientifiques, littéraires et industrielles de l'Auvergne. 28: 44–71.
- Juillard, Michelle (1978), Thomas Degeorge, 1786–1854 (exhibition catalogue, 28 October 1978 – 14 January 1979), Clermont-Ferrand: Musée Bargoin
