= Hauts-de-Seine's 13th constituency =

Constituency of the National Assembly of France

13th constituency of Hauts-de-Seine
- inline Constituency of the National Assembly of France

- Deputy: Maud Bregeon; RE
- Department: Hauts-de-Seine
- Cantons: Antony, Bourg-la-Reine, Châtenay-Malabry, Sceaux
- Registered voters: 86,550

The 13th constituency of the Hauts-de-Seine is a French legislative constituency in the Hauts-de-Seine département.

== Description ==
Hauts-de-Seine's 13th constituency covers the far south of the department.

Historically the constituency has supported the right with the sole exception of the 1981 election. The left has been competitive at times; its candidate lost by only 191 votes at the 2012 election.

== Historic Representative ==
Election	Member	Party
1967	Paul Mainguy	UDR
1968	Paul Mainguy	UDR
1973	Henri Ginoux	CNIP
1978	Henri Ginoux	UDF
1981	Philippe Bassinet	PS
1986	Proportional representation – no election by constituency	
1988	Patrick Devedjian	RPR
1993	Patrick Devedjian	RPR
1997	Patrick Devedjian	RPR
2002	Patrick Devedjian	UMP
2007	Patrick Devedjian	UMP
2012	Patrick Devedjian	UMP
2017	Frédérique Dumas	LREM
2018	Frédérique Dumas	LIOT
2022	Maud Bregeon	RE
2024	Maud Bregeon	RE
2024	Christophe Mongardien	RE

== Election results ==
=== 2024 ===
Candidate	Party	Alliance	First round			Second round		
Candidate	Party	Alliance	Votes	%	+/–	Votes	%	+/–
Maud Bregeon	RE	ENS	25,721	39.18	+6.34	33,310	56.12	-2.99
Brice Gaillard	PS	NFP	24,798	37.77	+9.86	26,044	43.88	+2.99
Patrick Yvars	RN		9,629	14.67	+8.82			
Numa Isnard	LR		3,613	5.50	+0.62			
Marie-Josée Preto	REC		770	1.17	-4.01			
Mohamed Tounsi	DVC		736	1.12	N/A			
Agathe Martin	LO		385	0.59	-0.02			
Valid votes			65,652	98.00	-0.07	59,345	94.31	+0.20
Blank votes			1,251	1.87	+0.02	3,339	5.31	-0.09
Null votes			87	0.13	+0.05	241	0.38	-0.11
Turnout			66,990	74.98	+18.28	62,934	70.44	+14.83
Abstentions			22,348	25.02	-18.28	26,414	29.56	-14.83
Registered voters			89,338			89,348		
Source: Ministry of the Interior, Le Monde
Result						RE HOLD		

=== 2022 ===
Legislative Election 2022: Hauts-de-Seine's 13th constituency
Party	Candidate	Votes	%	±%
LREM (Ensemble)	Maud Bregeon	16,441	32.84	-12.55
PS (NUPÉS)	Brice Gaillard	13,976	27.91	+9.37
UDI (UDC)	Philippe Laurent	8,259	16.49	N/A
RN	Patrick Yvars	2,929	5.85	+1.64
REC	Thibault Simonin	2,592	5.18	N/A
LR (UDC)	Numa Isnard	2,445	4.88	−19.89
PRG	Julien Gautrelet	1,965	3.92	N/A
Others	N/A	1,464		
Turnout		51,059	56.70	−0.67
2nd round result
LREM (Ensemble)	Maud Bregeon	27,864	59.11	-2.25
PS (NUPÉS)	Brice Gaillard	19,272	40.89	N/A
Turnout		47,136	55.61	+9.85
LREM hold				

=== 2017 ===
Legislative Election 2017: Hauts-de-Seine's 13th constituency
Party	Candidate	Votes	%	±%
LREM	Frédérique Dumas	23,201	45.39	N/A
LR	Georges Siffredi	12,664	24.77	−15.47
LFI	Nicolas Lasgi	4,448	8.70	N/A
PS	Banjamin Lanier	2,591	5.07	N/A
EELV	Denis Delrieu	2,437	4.77	−6.79
FN	Agnès Laffite	2,152	4.21	−1.26
DVG	Monique Pincon-Charlot	2,051	4.01	N/A
Others	N/A	1,575		
Turnout		51,119	57.37	−5.33
2nd round result
LREM	Frédérique Dumas	25,017	61.36	N/A
LR	Georges Siffredi	15,757	38.64	−11.54
Turnout		40,774	45.76	−16.00
LREM gain from LR		Swing		

=== 2012 ===
Legislative Election 2012: Hauts-de-Seine's 13th constituency
Party	Candidate	Votes	%	±%
UMP	Patrick Devedjian	21,839	40.24	−5.88
DVG	Julien Landfried	15,753	29.03	N/A
EELV	Fabien Feuillade	6,273	11.56	+7.37
FG	Pascale Le Neouannic	3,210	5.91	+3.39
FN	Michel Georget	2,968	5.47	+2.92
MoDem	Paul Cassia	2,302	4.24	−11.12
Others	N/A	1,924		
Turnout		54,269	62.70	−2.54
2nd round result
UMP	Patrick Devedjian	26,824	50.18	−4.72
DVG	Julien Landfried	26,633	49.82	N/A
Turnout		53,457	61.76	+1.80
UMP hold				

=== 2007 ===
Legislative Election 2007: Hauts-de-Seine's 13th constituency
Party	Candidate	Votes	%	±%
UMP	Patrick Devedjian	25,244	46.12	
PS	Michèle Canet	12,929	23.62	
MoDem	Chantal Brault	8,407	15.36	
LV	Denis Delrieu	2,291	4.19	
FN	Catherine Iorio	1,398	2.55	
PCF	Dominique Fie	1,382	2.52	
Far left	Stéphane Lepeuve	1,095	2.00	
Others	N/A	1,991		
Turnout		55,556	65.24	
2nd round result
UMP	Patrick Devedjian	27,018	54.90	
PS	Michèle Canet	22,197	45.10	
Turnout		51,058	59.96	
UMP hold				

=== 2002 ===
Legislative Election 2002: Hauts-de-Seine's 13th constituency
Party	Candidate	Votes	%	±%
UMP	Patrick Devedjian	27,355	48.80	
PS	Pascale Le Neouannic	15,955	28.46	
FN	Francois Le Hot	3,705	6.61	
PCF	Sylvain Bergounioux	1,757	3.13	
LV	Dominique Boisgard	1,590	2.84	
Others	N/A	5,692		
Turnout		56,680		
2nd round result
UMP	Patrick Devedjian	29,171	57.69	
PS	Pascale Le Neouannic	21,390	42.31	
Turnout		51,971	65.95	
UMP hold				

=== 1997 ===
Legislative Election 1997: Hauts-de-Seine's 13th constituency
Party	Candidate	Votes	%	±%
RPR	Patrick Devedjian	19,497	36.95	
PS	Jean-François Merle	13,112	24.85	
FN	Annick Martin	5,862	11.11	
PCF	Anne-Marie Geslain	3,621	6.86	
LV	Gérard Peurière	2,307	4.37	
DVD	Alain Rivière	1,680	3.18	
GE	Jean-Marie Laval	1,401	2.66	
LO	Louis Orhan	1,330	2.52	
MRC	Jean-Pierre Lettron	1,114	2.11	
Others	N/A	2,840		
Turnout		54,521	66.99	
2nd round result
RPR	Patrick Devedjian	30,568	55.85	
PS	Jean-François Merle	24,160	44.15	
Turnout		57,593	70.77	
RPR hold				

== Sources ==
- Official results of French elections from 1998: "Résultats électoraux officiels en France" (in French). Archived from the original on 20 December 2011.
