= Jean-Baptiste Antoine Blatin =

French politician

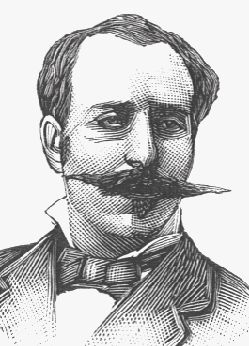
- Jean-Baptiste Antoine.
- Born: 1 August 1841; Clermont-Ferrand, France
- Died: 1911
- Occupation: Politician
- Relatives: Antoine Blatin (paternal great-uncle)

Jean-Baptiste Antoine Blatin (1841-1911) was a French politician. He served as the mayor of Clermont-Ferrand from 1884 to 1889, and as a member of the National Assembly for Puy-de-Dôme from 1885 to 1889.
