= Karekin Deveciyan =

Turkish-Armenian zoologist

Karekin Deveciyan (Ottoman Turkish: قره‌کین دوه‌جیان, romanized: Ḳarekin Deveciyân; 1868 in Harput – 1964 in Istanbul) was a Turkish-Armenian zoologist who wrote Balık ve Balıkçılık (Ottoman Turkish: بالق و بالقجیلق), one of the first scientific studies on fish and fisheries in Turkey. He served in the Ottoman bureaucracy and held offices related to fishery. He was the grandfather of French politician Patrick Devedjian.
