= Hôtel de Ville, Châtenay-Malabry =

Town hall in Châtenay-Malabry, France

Hôtel de Ville
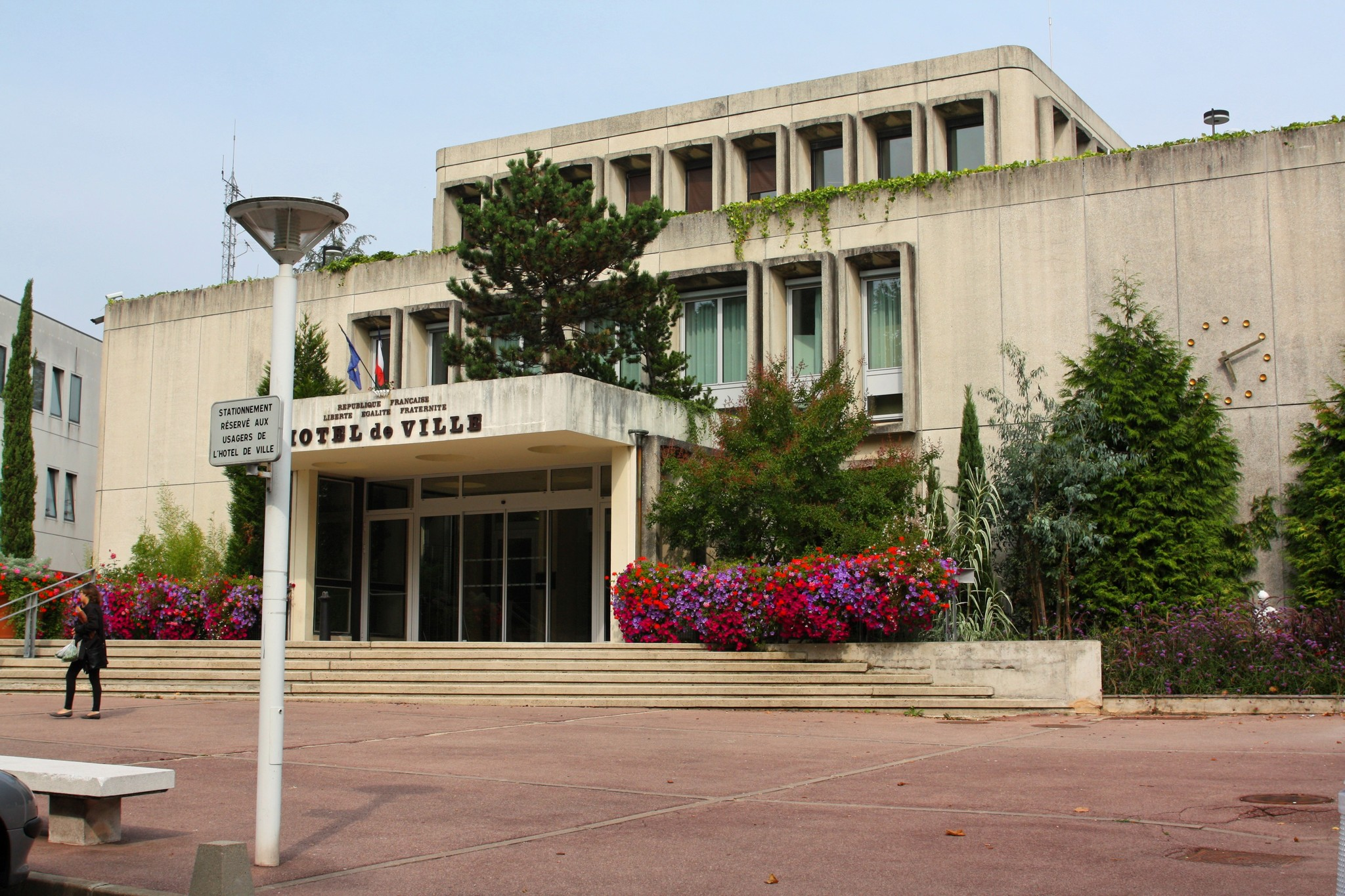
- The main frontage of the Hôtel de Ville in September 2009
- Interactive map of the Hôtel de Ville area

General information
- Type: City hall
- Architectural style: Brutalist style
- Location: Châtenay-Malabry, France
- Coordinates: 48.7673°N 2.2777°E
- Completed: 1977

The Hôtel de Ville (French pronunciation: [otɛl də vil], City Hall) is a municipal building in Châtenay-Malabry, Hauts-de-Seine, in the southwestern suburbs of Paris, standing on Rue du Docteur Le Savoureux.

== History ==
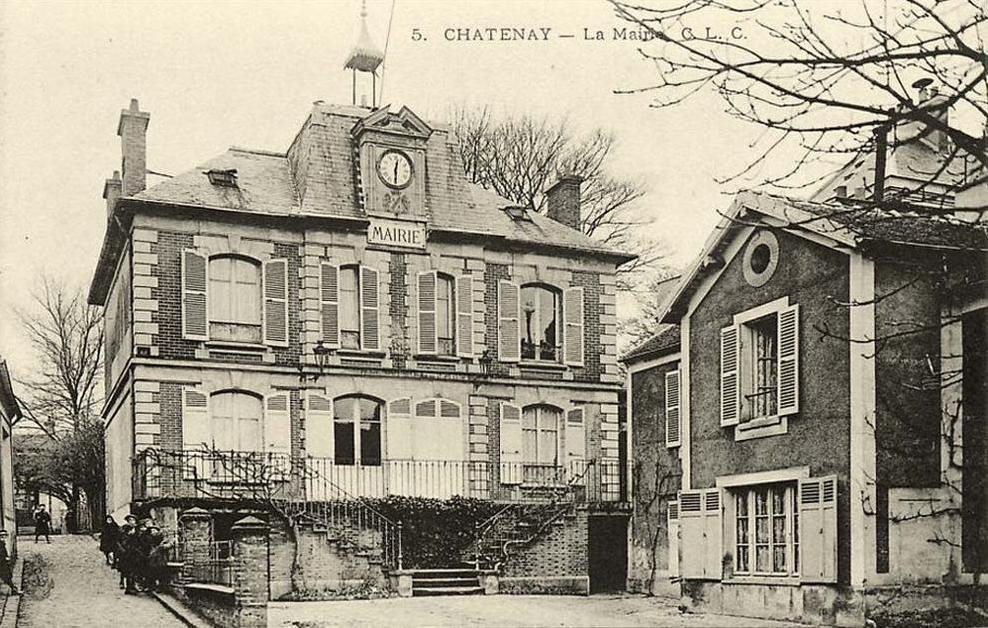
The first town hall, acquired in 1878

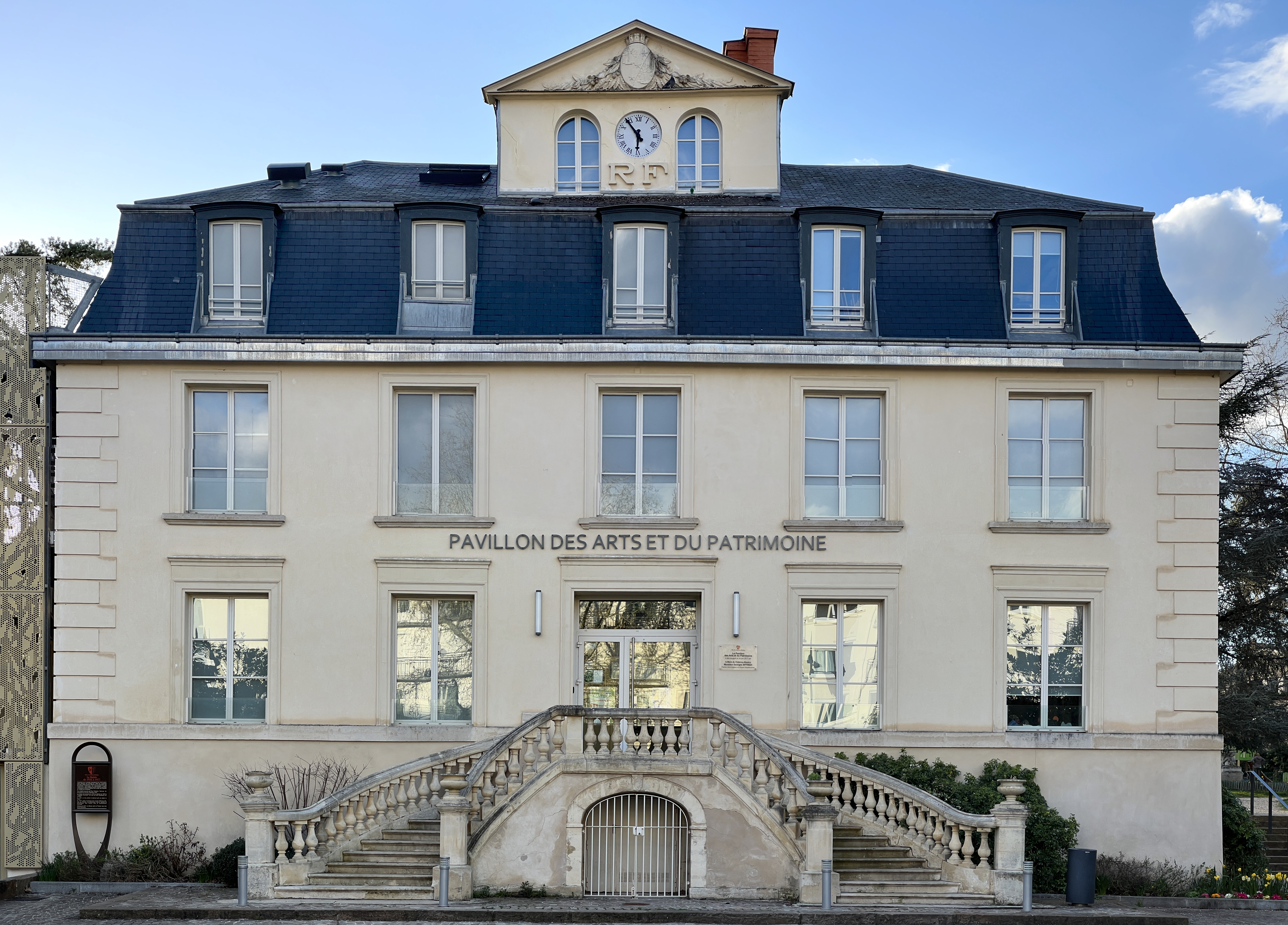
The second town hall, acquired in 1931

Following the French Revolution the town council initially rented a room for its meetings. In the mid-1870s, after finding this arrangement unsatisfactory, the council led by the mayor, Jules Eugène Sinet, decided to acquire a building for municipal purposes. The building it selected was on the west side of what is now Rue Jean Longuet. The house was commissioned by the Lemaire brothers in the mid-19th century. The council acquired the building in 1878 and converted it into a town hall at the centre of a complex which also included a school for boys.

The design of the first town hall, now designated No. 59–64 Rue Jean Longuet, involved a symmetrical main frontage of four bays facing onto the street. The building was on a slope and there was a forestair in front of the building, at basement level, allowing access to a pair of segmental headed doorways on the ground floor. The outer bays on the ground floor and all the bays on the first floor were fenestrated by segmental headed windows with stone surrounds, keystones and shutters. At roof level, there was an entablature, a cornice and a clock, which was flanked by pilasters supporting an open pediment. Behind the clock, there was a steep roof surmounted by a small belfry with a pyramid-shaped roof and a finial. After the building was no longer required for municipal purposes, it became a conservatory and, later, a youth centre known as Cap Jeunes.

In the early 1930s, the council led by the mayor, Jean Longuet, decided to acquire a more substantial building for municipal purposes. The building it selected was the Maison Vauchelet, also on the west side of Rue Jean Longuet, just 200 metres (660 ft) to the south of the first town hall. The house was commissioned by the Vauchelet family in the late-18th century. It was bought by a painter, Alexandre-Dominique Denuelle, in 1869. After Denuelle died in 1879, it became the home of his daughter, Thérèse, and her husband, the philosopher, Hippolyte Taine. It was bought by the Verchère family in 1913 and was then acquired by the council in 1931.

The design of the second town hall, now designated No. 94 Rue Jean Longuet, involved a symmetrical main frontage of five bays facing onto the street. This building was also on a slope and there was a forestair in front of the building, at basement level, allowing access to a square headed doorway in the central bay on the ground floor. The other bays on the ground floor and all the bays on the first floor were fenestrated by square headed casement windows with cornices. There were five dormer windows at attic level. At the centre of the roof there was a single stage tower, containing a clock, which was flanked by two round headed windows and surmounted by a pediment with a coat of arms in the tympanum. After the building was no longer required for municipal purposes, it became the Bibliothèque Jean Moulin (Jean Moulin Library), then the Conservatoire Municipal (Municipal Conservatory) before becoming the Pavillon des Arts et du Patrimoine (Pavilion of Arts and Heritage) in 2017.

In the early 1970s, following significant population growth, the council led by the mayor, André Mignon, decided to commission a modern town hall. The site they selected was on the north side of Rue du Docteur Le Savoureux. The new building was designed in the Brutalist style, built in concrete and glass and was officially opened by the First Secretary of the Socialist Party, François Mitterrand, in October 1977.

The design of the third town hall involved a near symmetrical main frontage facing onto the street. The building was in the three sections with the two-storey outer sections featuring blind concrete walls. The central section featured a portico formed by a pair of square columns supporting a canopy. The central section was fenestrated by seven tall casement windows on the first floor, and by nine more casement windows on the second floor which covered a smaller area and was recessed. Internally, the principal room was the Salle du Conseil (council chamber), which remains closed to the public.
