= Vallée-aux-Loups =

French estate

Domaine de la Vallée-aux-Loups
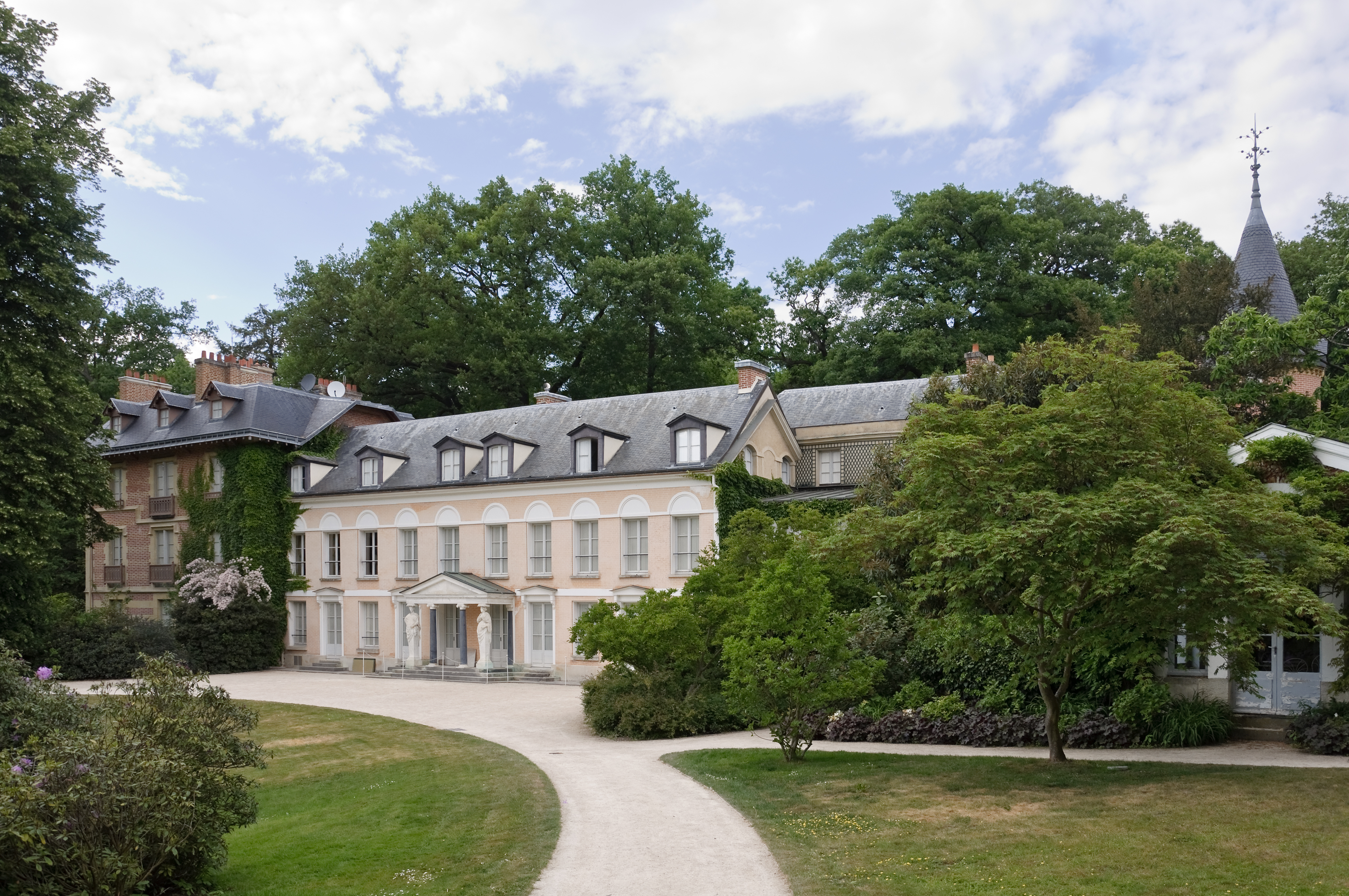
- Interactive map of Domaine de la Vallée-aux-Loups
- Location: Val d'Aulnay; Châtenay-Malabry, Hauts-de-Seine
- Coordinates: 48°46′22″N 2°15′52″E
- Type: Villa, museum
- Heritage: Listed in the general inventory Listed as a historic monument (1964); Houses of Illustrious People; Listed as a historic monument (1978)

The Vallée-aux-Loups is an estate at 87, rue de Chateaubriand in Châtenay-Malabry (Hauts-de-Seine), within the Vallée-aux-Loups park. It was occupied by François-René de Chateaubriand from 1807 to 1818 and is protected as a historic monument.

Now a departmental cultural institution known as the Maison de Chateaubriand, it is dedicated to Chateaubriand and Romanticism, while also hosting activities open to contemporary authors and the general public.

== History ==
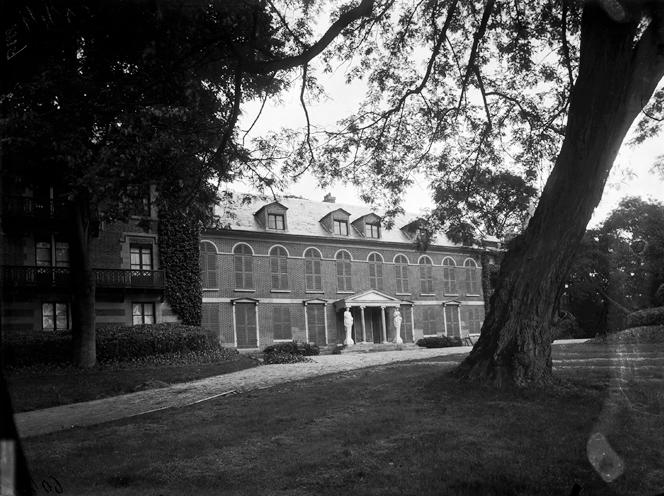
The House of Chateaubriand photographed by Eugène Atget in 1901.

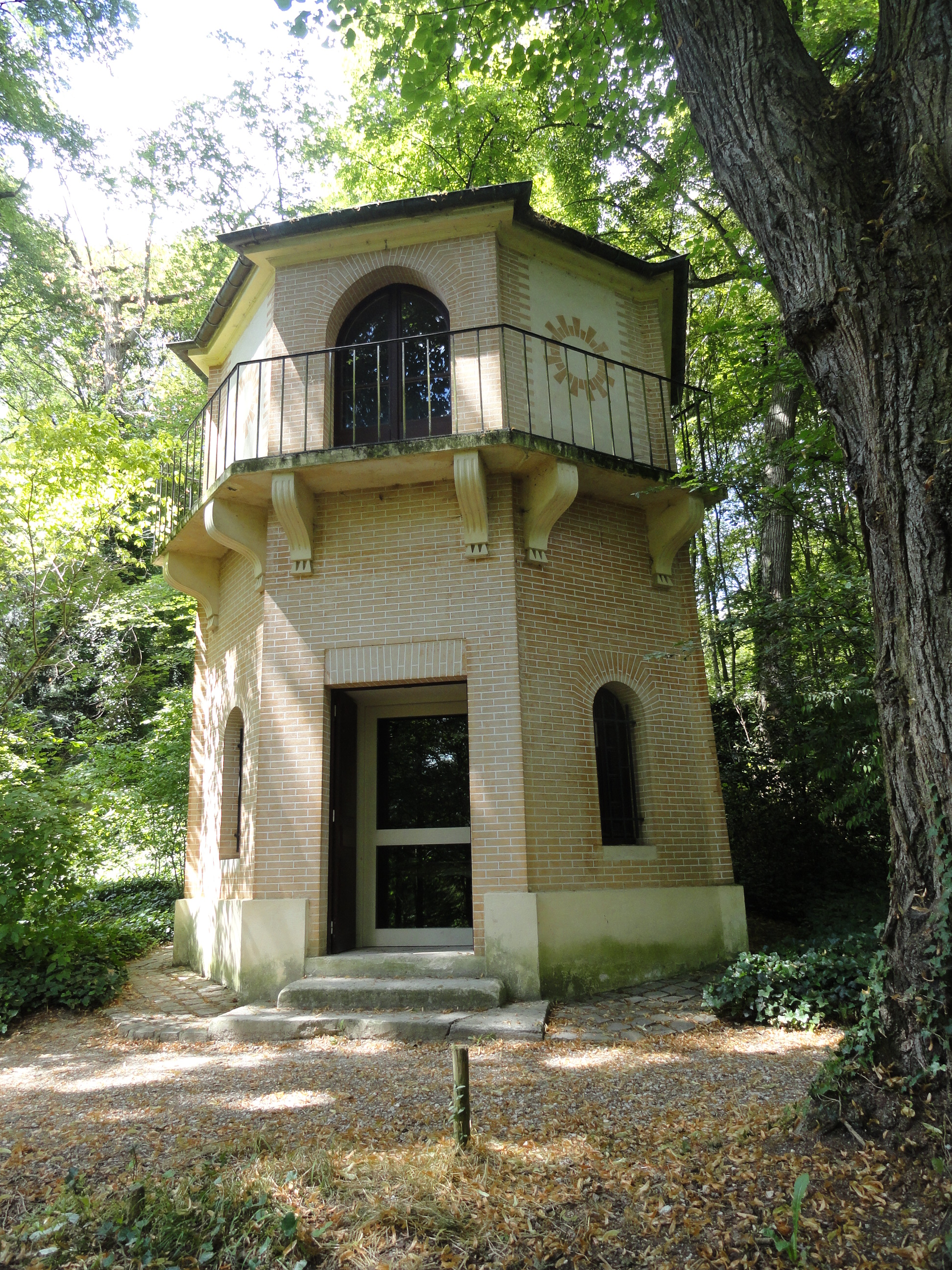
The Velléda Tower, in the park, where Chateaubriand liked to retreat to write.

The house was built at the end of the 18th century by the brewer André-Arnoult Acloque.

On 22 August 1807, François-René de Chateaubriand acquired the Vallée-aux-Loups estate, in the hamlet of Aulnay, for 20,000 francs, likely with financial support from the Countess of Choiseul-Beaupré.

In 1807, François-René de Chateaubriand was an established writer, notably known for Atala (1801) and Génie du christianisme (1802). For several years, he had sought a secluded residence conducive to writing, away from Parisian social life. Following the publication in the Mercure de France of an article in which he compared Napoleon to Nero after returning from the Orient, he was compelled to leave Paris and settled at the Vallée-aux-Loups. There, he wrote several works in the Velléda Tower, built at the end of the 18th century and named by Chateaubriand after a character from his novel Les Martyrs. The tower housed his study and library.

He continued to develop the estate and created the 14-hectare Vallée-aux-Loups park, planting it with cedars, catalpas, tulip trees, cypresses, and other exotic trees that reminded him of his travels. He was assisted in this by Sophie de Fuligny-Damas, who intervened with Alexander von Humboldt to ensure that Aimé Bonpland supplied shrubs from Malmaison.

After losing his position as Minister of State in 1816, Chateaubriand experienced serious financial difficulties. In 1817, he sold the Vallée-aux-Loups estate at auction. It was purchased for 50,000 francs by the Duke of Montmorency-Laval, who granted Juliette Récamier use of the estate for two years.

The Duke of Montmorency had a wing with a turret and an orangery constructed on the site. In 1826, the estate was inherited by his daughter Élisabeth de Montmorency, who was married to Sosthènes de La Rochefoucauld. It subsequently passed to their son, Sosthène II, under whose ownership substantial modifications were undertaken. The property was sold in 1910 by his son, Armand, Duke of La Rochefoucauld-Doudeauville (1870–1963).

From 1914 onward, the estate became the property of Dr. Henri Le Savoureux, a psychiatrist, who established a rest home there. In 1929, he founded the Société Chateaubriand, which continues to maintain its headquarters at the estate. During this period, Dr. Le Savoureux and his wife regularly hosted several figures from the literary, artistic, and scientific communities for lunch, including Anna de Noailles, Paul Valéry, Paul Léautaud, Julien Benda, Abbé Mugnier, Jean Paulhan, Professor Robert Debré (1882–1978), Jules Supervielle, Marc Chagall, Berenice Abbott, and Jean Grenier.

On 6 November 1929, the writer Jacques Rigaut committed suicide there with a gunshot to the heart.

During the Second World War, the painter Jean Fautrier took refuge in the Velléda tower, where he created his series The Hostages while witnessing the execution of hostages in the nearby valley (Note: One hundred meters from his studio, the Gestapo and the Carlingue would deposit tortured bodies at night or execute members of the Resistance.) at a place known as L'Orme mort. In 1942, Félix Fénéon, together with his wife and his companion Camille Platteel, resided at Vallée-aux-Loups, where he maintained contact with Abbé Mugnier.

Paul Léautaud died at the estate in 1956. Following the death of Dr. Henri Le Savoureux, his widow continued his work. In 1967, the Vallée-aux-Loups estate was sold to the department of the Seine, and it became the property of the General Council of Hauts-de-Seine in 1987.

The Maison de Chateaubriand is a departmental museum that presents period furnishings and a collection of documents related to François-René de Chateaubriand. Among the exhibits is the chaise longue depicted in the 1800 portrait of Madame Récamier by Jacques-Louis David. In late 2019, the museum acquired a marble sculpture of Veleda by Laurent Marqueste, measuring 71 × 74 × 42 cm, at an Artcurial auction.

=== Protection ===
The ensemble, including the façades and roofs, the interior staircase and railing, the Velléda tower, and the park, has been listed as a historic monument since 24 January 1978. The remaining parts of the property, comprising the main house and the wing added by the Duke of Montmorency with its turret, have been registered as a historic monument since 31 January 1964.

== Environment ==
From 1986, the departmental council took over the Croux nurseries adjacent to the estate and developed the Vallée-aux-Loups arboretum, establishing themed gardens related to the history and topography of the site. The arboretum, recognized with the "remarkable garden" label, contains more than 500 species of trees and shrubs and includes the Île Verte, which is open to the public.

== Description ==
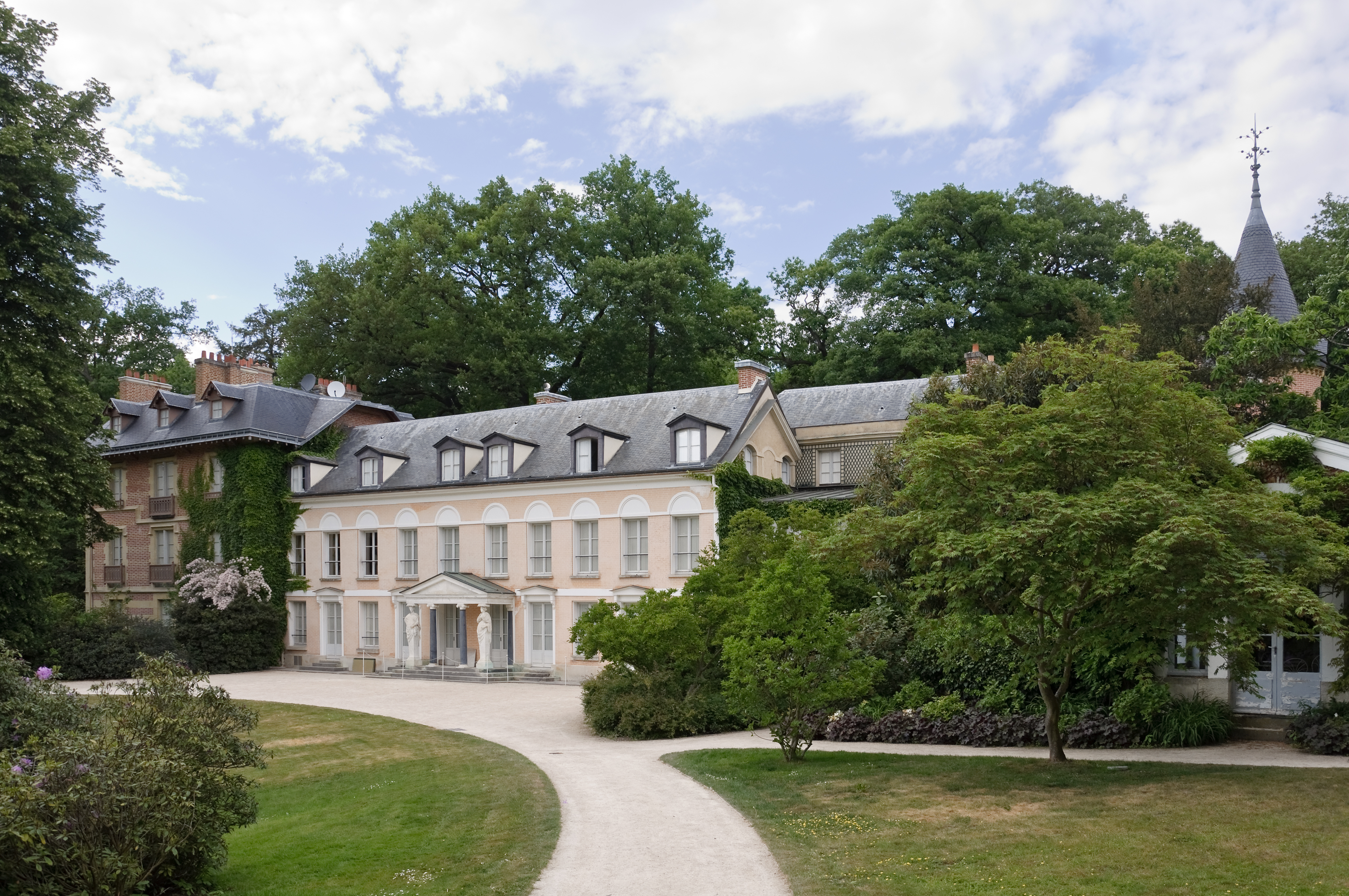
The House of Chateaubriand is now a museum.

The entire property consists of three buildings.

1. The Aclocque house, at the center of the estate, dates from 1783. Chateaubriand had the façade modified with a neoclassical peristyle, featuring a triangular pediment supported by two columns and two caryatids. The ground floor contains a vestibule with a staircase to the upper level, a dining room on the left, and a large drawing room on the right. The upper floor includes Madame Récamier's bedroom with an antechamber on the left and Chateaubriand's bedroom on the right. Chateaubriand resided exclusively in this building.
2. The Montmorency wing, constructed between 1818 and 1820 to the right of the Aclocque house, contains on the ground floor the Blue Salon, which connects to the large drawing room. From there, access is provided to the Le Savoureux Salon and the ogival vestibule, built on the site of a former small lean-to associated with Chateaubriand. Continuing to the right, the Girodet Salon leads to a literary study. The upper floor is accessible via a spiral staircase, and the wing is flanked by the so-called troubadour turret.
3. The La Rochefoucauld pavilion, constructed between 1860 and 1865, is to the left of the Aclocque house and is a counterpart to the Montmorency wing. The ground floor houses the museum reception, shop, and library, while the upper floor contains additional library space and offices.

=== Ground floor ===
==== Dining room ====
The dining room, which was the drawing room during Chateaubriand's residence, has walls covered with white and green marbled wallpaper, based on a design from 1810–1820 preserved at the Museum of Decorative Arts in Paris. The room is illuminated by two windows, one overlooking the park and the other the woodland. A white earthenware stove, similar to that listed in the 1818 inventory by Maître Denis, is also present. The room includes a portrait of Céleste de Chateaubriand.

==== Vestibule ====
The entrance to the house during Chateaubriand's residence, this room contains a distinctive staircase, reportedly installed by the writer and possibly sourced from an English ship dismasted at Saint-Malo. The staircase has been interpreted as reflecting Chateaubriand's connection to Brittany, his interest in the sea, and his appreciation for travel. The façade of the house has a neoclassical portico with two black marble columns and two white marble caryatids, added by Chateaubriand.

==== Large drawing room ====
The room, formerly used as Chateaubriand's dining room, is decorated with a painted and glazed fabric, known as perse, featuring foliage patterns from the Braquenié firm, reproducing the nineteenth-century decoration. The furniture, made of speckled maple and amaranth marquetry, dates from the Restoration period. The room also reflects aspects of Chateaubriand's political and diplomatic career, including a portrait by Pierre-Louis Delaval (1825) depicting him in the attire of a member of the Chamber of Peers, a position he assumed in 1815 and later relinquished during the July Monarchy.

==== Blue salon ====
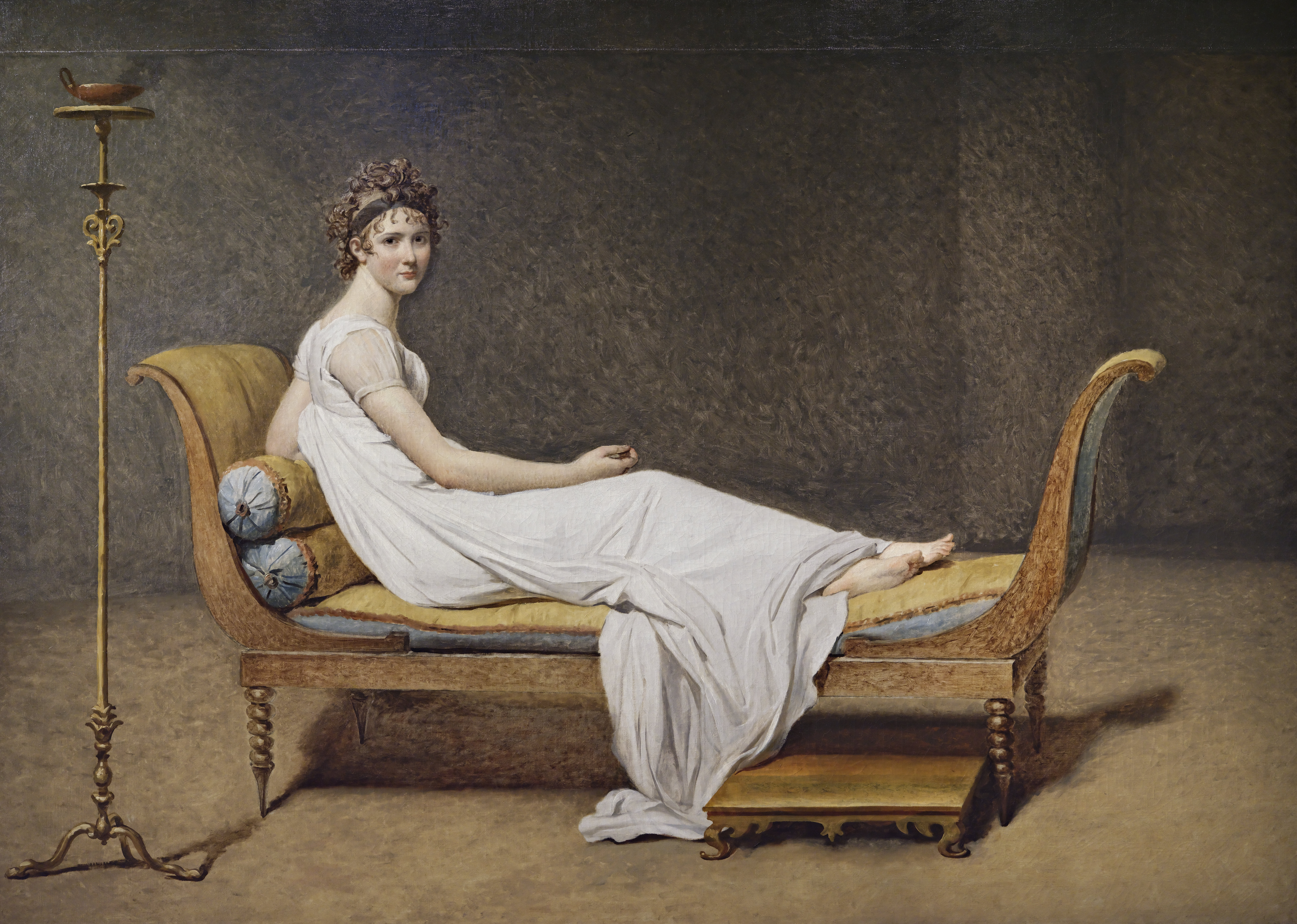
Jacques-Louis David, Portrait of Madame Récamier (1800), Paris, Louvre Museum.

This salon, on the site of the former kitchen during Chateaubriand's residence, is associated with Juliette Récamier, whom Chateaubriand met at a dinner hosted by Germaine de Staël in 1817. The room contains a studio copy of the chaise longue depicted in Jacques-Louis David's 1800 portrait of Récamier, the original of which is held at the Louvre Museum.

The salon also houses an 1889 marble sculpture by Laurent Marqueste representing Veleda, the Gallic druidess from Chateaubriand's 1809 novel Les Martyrs. The character of Velléda was inspired by Natalie de Noailles, who was among Chateaubriand's muses.

==== Le Savoureux salon ====
This room is associated with the last private owners of the Vallée-aux-Loups, Henri Le Savoureux and his wife Lydie Plekhanov. Le Savoureux purchased the property from the La Rochefoucauld family in 1914 and established a health retreat, which accommodated patients recovering from illness or suffering from depression.

The couple also hosted figures from the literary, artistic, and intellectual circles of the early twentieth century, making the estate a venue for cultural and creative exchange.

==== Girodet salon ====
This salon displays a portrait of François-René de Chateaubriand by Anne-Louis Girodet-Trioson, a contemporary and associate of the writer. The painting is a modello of the work presented at the Salon of 1810 as Homme méditant sur les ruines de Rome; the original is held at the museum of Saint-Malo.

=== First floor ===
==== The writer's bedroom ====
Formerly Chateaubriand's bedroom, this room is now dedicated to the works he composed at the Vallée-aux-Loups between 1807 and 1817. During this period, he wrote the prose epic Les Martyrs, the travel narrative Itinéraire de Paris à Jérusalem, as well as two works published later: the Moorish tale L'Abencerage and the biblical tragedy Moïse. He also began his Historical Studies and the Memoirs of My Life, which were later published as Mémoires d'outre-tombe. In 1814, following the fall of Napoleon, he engaged in political writing with De Buonaparte et des Bourbons and contributed various newspaper articles and pamphlets.

==== Madame Récamier's bedroom ====
This space includes an antechamber and the bedroom occupied by Juliette Récamier during her stays at the Vallée-aux-Loups between 1818 and 1826, after the property was sold by Chateaubriand to Mathieu de Montmorency. When Chateaubriand resided at the estate, the room served as the bedroom of his wife, Céleste de Chateaubriand.

The room displays an engraving of Récamier's residence at the Abbaye-aux-Bois, as well as a copy of the painting Corinne at Cape Misenum, based on an original by François Gérard. The work is associated with Germaine de Staël, a friend of Récamier and host where she met Chateaubriand.

==== Landing ====
On the staircase landing is the painting Les Adieux de René à sa sœur by Lancelot-Théodore Turpin de Crissé, exhibited at the Salon of 1806. It depicts a scene from the novel René, published in 1802 as part of Chateaubriand's The Genius of Christianity.

==== Marie-Thérèse infirmary ====
The small room following the landing is dedicated to Céleste de Chateaubriand and highlights the charitable institution she founded in 1820 to accommodate elderly priests and women of the aristocracy affected by the Revolution. In the chapel of this institution, originally on rue d'Enfer (later Avenue Denfert-Rochereau), François Gérard created a representation of Saint Teresa of Ávila; the Maison de Chateaubriand preserves the original modello of this work.

==== Chateaubriand's bedroom ====
Formerly Céleste de Chateaubriand's sitting room, this space now recreates the décor of Chateaubriand's bedroom during the final year of his life in his apartment on rue du Bac. The room contains two paintings: a portrait of Chateaubriand by Antoine Étex, created one year before his death, and a depiction of his funeral procession to the Grand Bé, where he was interred on 19 July 1848.

== See also ==
- Châtenay-Malabry
- François-René de Chateaubriand
- Musée des Arts Décoratifs, Paris

== Bibliography ==
- de Ganay, Ernest (1938). Châteaux et Manoirs de France : Île de France [Castles and Manor Houses of France: Île-de-France] (in French). Vol. 1. Paris: Vincent et Fréal.
- Rochette, Hélène (2004). Maisons d'écrivains et d'artistes. Paris et ses alentours [Homes of writers and artists. Paris and its surroundings] (in French). Paris: Parigramme. pp. 136–141. ISBN 2-84096-227-6.
- Davet, Michel (1965). Les Amants de la Vallée aux Loups [The Lovers of the Valley of Wolves] (in French). Le Cercle du Bibliophile.
