= Maud Bregeon =

French politician (born 1991)

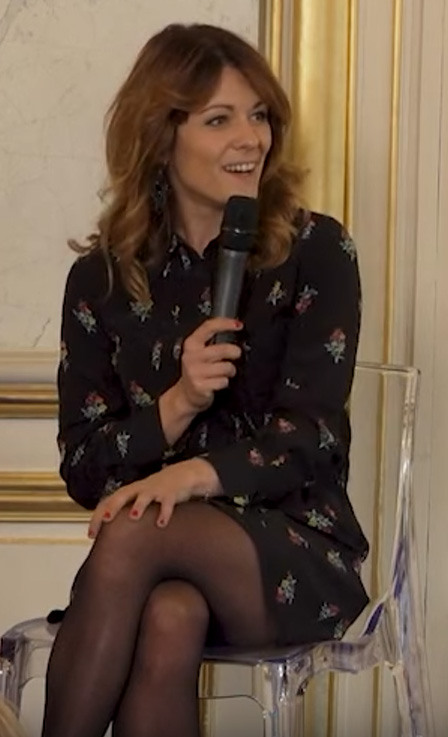
- Bregeon in 2023

Spokesperson of the Government
- Incumbent
- Assumed office 12 October 2025
- Prime Minister: Sébastien Lecornu
- Preceded by: Aurore Bergé
- In office 21 September 2024 – 5 December 2024
- Prime Minister: Michel Barnier
- Preceded by: Prisca Thevenot
- Succeeded by: Sophie Primas

Member of the National Assembly for Hauts-de-Seine's 13th constituency
- In office 14 January 2024 – 12 October 2025
- Preceded by: Christophe Mongardien
- Succeeded by: Christophe Mongardien
- In office 22 June 2022 – 21 October 2024
- Preceded by: Frédérique Dumas
- Succeeded by: Christophe Mongardien

Personal details
- Born: 11 February 1991 (age 35) Poitiers, France
- Party: Renaissance
- Education: École Polytechnique de l'Université de Nantes

Maud Bregeon (born 11 February 1991) is a French politician of Renaissance, who has served as the spokeswoman of the Government in the Barnier government between September and December 2024 and again for the government of Prime Minister Sébastien Lecornu since 2025. She first became a deputy for Hauts-de-Seine's 13th constituency in the National Assembly in 2022.

== Early life and education ==
Bregeon born on 11 February 1991 in Poitiers in the department of Vienne. Her mother is a secretary, her father is a professor of sociology. She graduated with an engineer's degree from École Polytechnique de l'Université de Nantes (Nantes Polytech graduate school).

== Early career ==
Bregeon worked for the French electricity company EDF from 2014 to 2022 where she specialised in contracts and crisis situations until she was elected to the National Assembly.

Bregeon voted for Nicolas Sarkozy in the presidential election of 2012, but, after François Fillon's victory in the right wing primary of 2016, she identified less with Les Republicains. She joined Emmanuel Macron's En marche party in November 2016. She became the head of En marche in the town of Levallois-Perret, and later the candidate for the Hauts-de-Seine department.

== Political career ==
In July 2022, Bregeon was elected to the National Assembly as a representative for the Hauts-de-Seine department.

In parliament, Bregeon has been serving on the Defence Committee and the Committee on Economic Affairs Committee.

In addition to her committee assignments, she has been a member of the Parliamentary Office for the Evaluation of Scientific and Technological Choices since 2022.

In November 2020, Bregeon was appointed spokeswoman for Emmanuel Macron’s party, La République en marche (LaREM), jointly with Prisca Thevenot.

In September 2024, she succeeded Thevenot as spokeswoman of the Government upon the formation of the Barnier government.

== Other activities ==
- National Agency for the Management of Radioactive Waste (ANDRA), Member of the Board of Directors

== See also ==
- List of deputies of the 16th National Assembly of France
