= Frédérique Dumas =

French film producer and politician

Member of the National Assembly for Hauts-de-Seine's 13th constituency
- In office 21 June 2017 – 21 June 2022
- Preceded by: Patrick Devedjian
- Succeeded by: Maud Bregeon

Personal details
- Born: 18 May 1963 (age 63) Paris, France
- Party: Union of Democrats and Independents
- Education: Panthéon-Assas University
- Occupation: Film producer

Frédérique Dumas (born 18 May 1963) is a French film producer and politician of the Union of Democrats and Independents (UDI) who served as a member of the National Assembly from 2017 to 2022. She was the CEO of Studio 37, the film production subsidiary of Orange.

== Early life and education ==
Dumas studied at the Institut Libre for International Relations Studies (Panthéon-Assas University), and holds a bachelor's degree in information/communication.

== Film career ==
From 1989 to 1993, Dumas was a film consultant for the French Ministry of Culture. At the same time, she was holding a director of development position at Polygram.

In 1996, Dumas created NoéProductions, and IngaFilms in 2004, two independent film production companies based in Paris, France. In parallel, she was President of the Bureau de Liaison des Industries Cinématographiques, the office that syndicates most of the French film unions.

In 2005, she was a member of the jury for the 20th movie festival in Paris.

She was the CEO of Studio 37 (now Orange Studio), the film production subsidiary of Orange.

== Political career ==
From 1989 to 1997, Dumas was the Cultural Affairs delegate to the mayor of Antony, France.

From 2001 to 2005, Dumas was the media and culture spokesperson for the French political party, the UDF. Since April 2004, she was also the regional counselor of the Ile-de-France county.

Since July 2009, Dumas is the National Secretary in charge of new media for the French political party, the Nouveau Centre.

In 2017, Dumas was elected as a deputy to the National Assembly as a member of La République En Marche!, having left the Union of Democrats and Independents earlier in the year. In parliament, she serves on the Committee on Foreign Affairs. In late 2018, she joined an informal group on Grand Paris.

In 2020, Satoury joined Sylvie Guillaume, Mounir Satouri and Hubert Julien-Laferrière in visiting several refugee camps in northern Syria that hold individuals displaced from the Islamic State of Iraq and the Levant, including al-Hawl and Roj.

She stood down at the 2022 French legislative election.

== Filmography ==
- 1996: Dobermann, Jan Kounen
- 1998: Train de vie, Radu Mihăileanu
- 2001: No man's land, Danis Tanović
- 2001: Les portes de la gloire, Christian Merret-Palmair
- 2002: Inquiry into the invisible world, Jean-Michel Roux

=== Studio 37 coproductions ===
- 2008: My Own Love Song, Olivier Dahan
- 2008: The French Kissers, Riad Sattouf
- 2008: Lascars, Albert Pereira and Emmanuel Klotz
- 2008: Le Coach, Olivier Doran
- 2008: Cyprien, David Charhon
- 2008: Thelma, Louise et Chantal, Benoît Pétré
- 2010: Gainsbourg (Vie héroïque), Antoine Sfar
- 2011: ...And If We All Lived Together, Stéphane Robelin
- 2014: Les Gazelles, Mona Achache

== Awards ==
- 1994: Golden lion Mostra de Venise, Before the rain
- 2001: Oscar for best foreign film, No man's land
- 2001: Best screenplay at the Cannes film festival, No man's land
- 2002: César awarded, No man's land
