= Antoine Blatin =

French politician

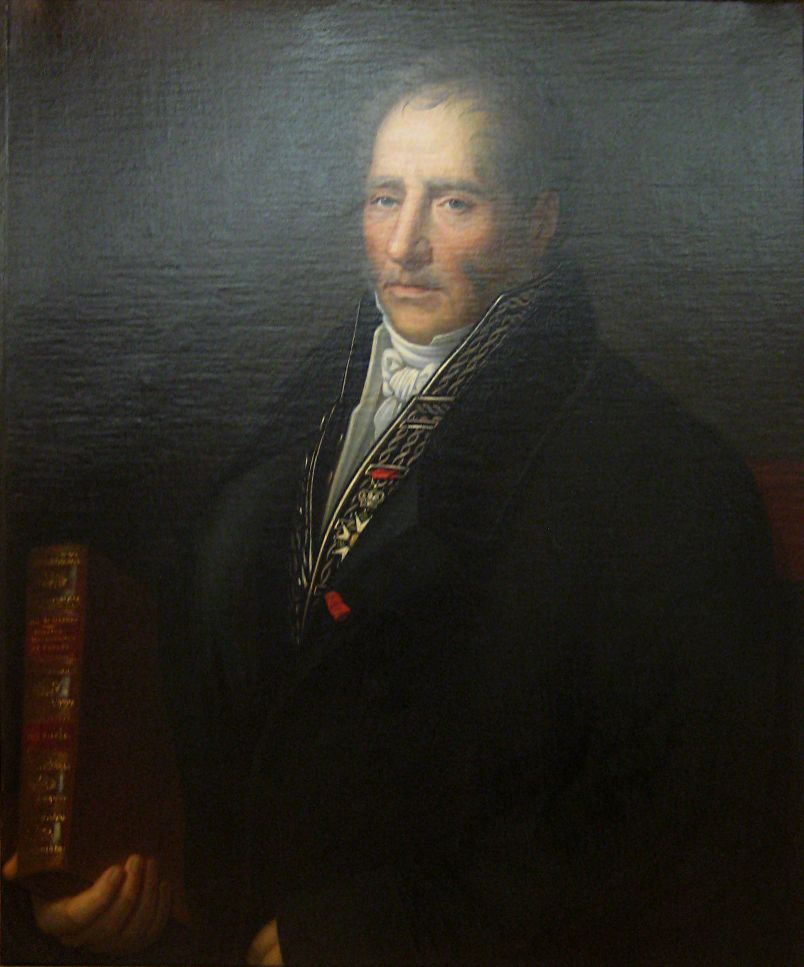
- Portrait of Antoine Blatin by Thomas Degeorge, 1846
- Born: 1769
- Died: 1846
- Occupation: Politician
- Relatives: Jean-Baptiste Antoine Blatin (great-nephew)

Antoine Blatin (1769–1846) was a French politician. He served as the mayor of Clermont-Ferrand from 1822 to 1830.
