= Arboretum de la Vallée-aux-Loups =

Arboretum in Hauts-de-Seine, Île-de-France, France

Coordinates: 48°46′22″N 2°16′7″E

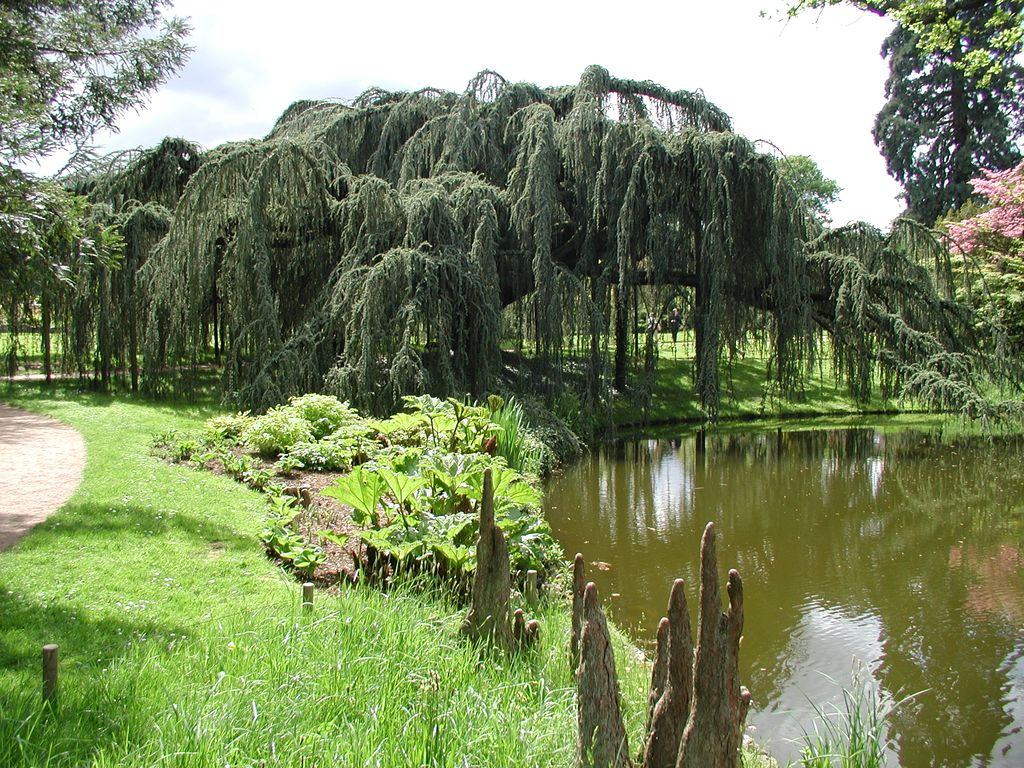
Arboretum de la Vallée-aux-Loups

The Arboretum de la Vallée-aux-Loups (13.5 hectares) is a notable arboretum located at 102 rue de Chateaubriand, near the Maison de Chateaubriand, in Châtenay-Malabry, Hauts-de-Seine, Île-de-France, France. It is open daily except Monday, but closed in January; an admission fee is charged.

The park was created circa 1777 by the Chevalier François-Louis Durant du Bignon. It was confiscated during the French Revolution, changed hands several times, and then acquired in 1804 by Louis Cadet de Gassicourt, pharmacist to Napoleon, who collected and maintained rare plants on the property. (In 1807 an adjacent house was purchased by François-René de Chateaubriand, which he christened La Vallée aux Loups, "Valley of the Wolves", and where he subsequently dwelled with his wife until 1818.) The park was sold in 1890 to Louis-Gustave Croux who created today's arboretum. In 1986 it was sold once more to the Conseil Général des Hauts-de-Seine, its current owner.

Today the garden is laid out as a landscaped park with a pond, island, and bridges, and contains about 2500 plants representing more than 500 woody species, including 165 species of trees. It is organized into a dozen gardens, including an English garden, fruit garden, chestnut garden, and Convolvulaceae collection. The hydrangea garden contains more than 300 cultivars, and is nationally designated one of the Conservatoire des Collections Végétales Spécialisées (CCVS).

== See also ==
- List of botanical gardens in France
