= Châtenay-Malabry =

- Commune
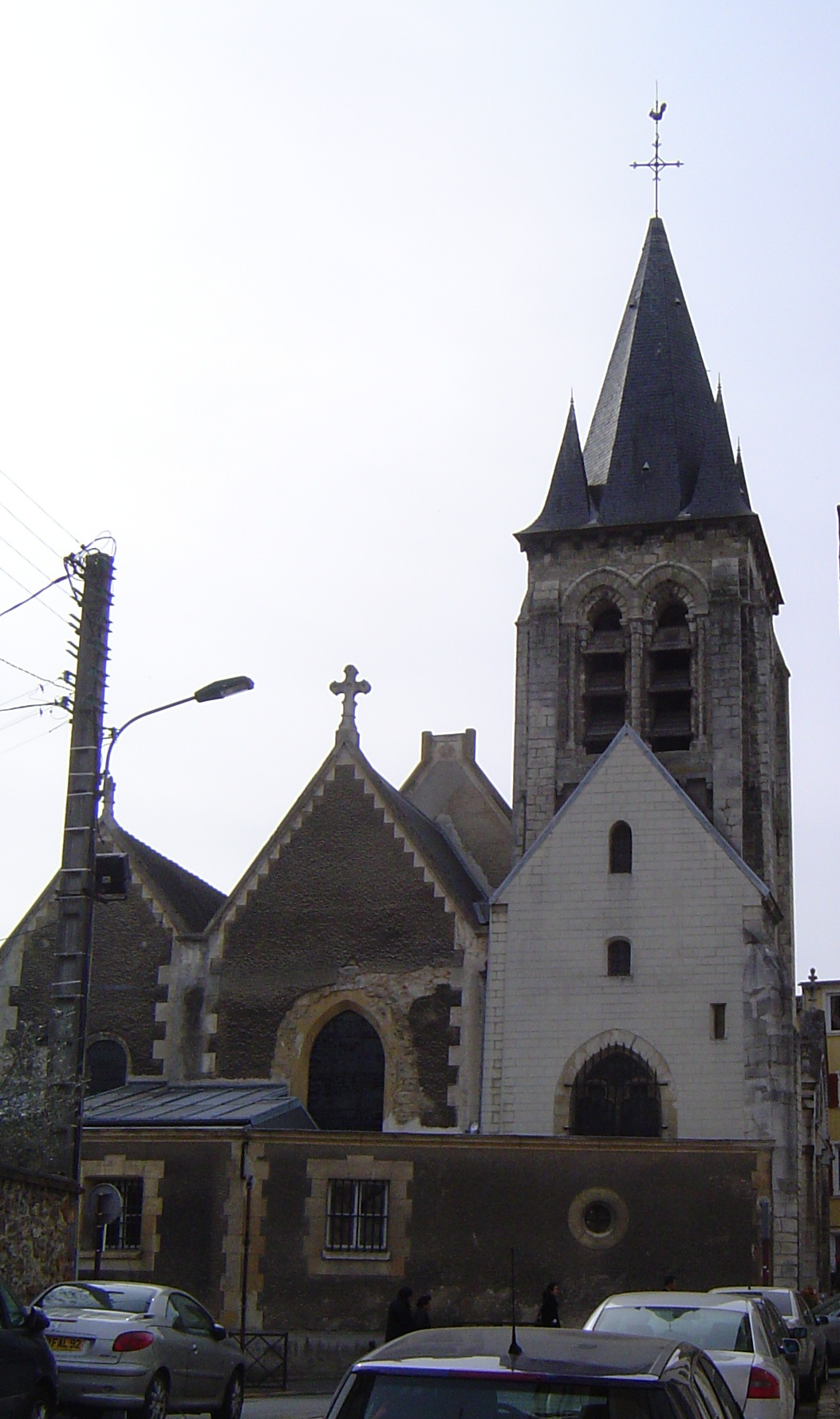
- The church of Saint-Germain l'Auxerrois

- Coat of arms

- Location (in red) within Paris inner suburbs
- Location of Châtenay-Malabry
- Location within France Location within Île-de-France (region)
- Coordinates: 48°45′55″N 2°16′41″E
- Country: France
- Region: Île-de-France
- Department: Hauts-de-Seine
- Arrondissement: Antony
- Canton: Châtenay-Malabry
- Intercommunality: Grand Paris

Government
  - Mayor (2026–32): Carl Ségaud
- Area^{1}: 6.38 km^{2} (2.46 sq mi)
- Elevation: 104 m (341 ft)
- Population (2023): 35,825
  - Density: 5,620/km^{2} (14,500/sq mi)
- Time zone: UTC+01:00 (CET)
  - Summer (DST): UTC+02:00 (CEST)
- INSEE/Postal code: 92019 /92290
- ^{1} French Land Register data, which excludes lakes, ponds, glaciers > 1 km^{2} (0.386 sq mi or 247 acres) and river estuaries.

Châtenay-Malabry (French pronunciation: [ʃatnɛ malabʁi]) is a commune in the southwestern suburbs of Paris. It is located 10.8 km (6.7 mi) from the center of Paris.

The French writer Chateaubriand lived in the estate Vallée-aux-Loups at Châtenay-Malabry. The Garden City in the Butte Rouge, the Cité Jardins, is one of the earliest examples of housing at moderated rents (HLM).

Châtenay was the location of École Centrale Paris, of the Faculty of Pharmacy of the University of Paris-Sud and is the location of French national laboratory of doping detection. It is also the home of the Arboretum de la Vallée-aux-Loups. The high-speed LGV Atlantique crosses the city through a tunnel covered by a park called Coulée verte (greenway).

From 31 December 2002, it was part of the Agglomeration community of Hauts de Bièvre, which merged into the Métropole du Grand Paris in January 2016.

== Geography ==
Châtenay-Malabry is situated near the Parc de Sceaux.

It borders the department of Essonne which borders the department of Yvelines. Châtenay-Malabry is demarcated by the communes of Sceaux, Antony, Bièvres, Plessis-Robinson and Verrières-le-Buisson.

A highly wooded area, it can be crossed by the Coulée verte du sud parisien, which includes part of Via Turonesis which is one of the routes through France on the pilgrimage to the tomb of St. James the Great. As for the North and South entrances, they are, to say the least, a part of the urban fabric of the town.

The two main entrances to the town are located west and east of the Division Leclerc avenue, which is the main road of the town. In the direction of Verrières Forest is a large roundabout which appears as a clearing in the forest before diving into the urban landscape. In the direction of Antony is a simple roundabout located at the southeast corner of the Sceaux Park.

== History ==
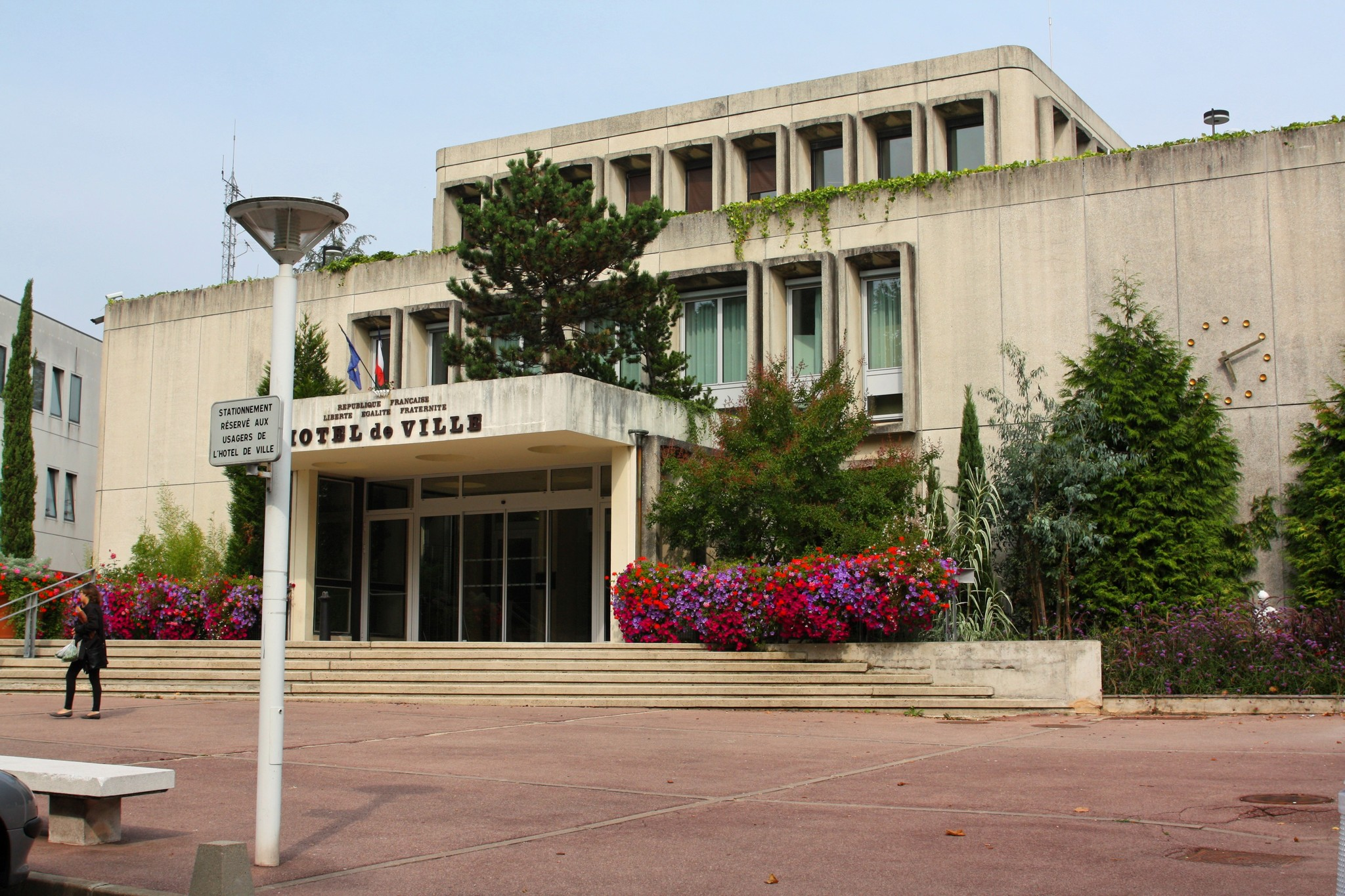
The Hôtel de Ville

Originally simply called Châtenay, the name of the commune officially became Châtenay-Malabry in 1920.

The name Châtenay comes from castellanum = petit château (little castle) and Malabry comes from a deformation of badly located, spoiled ground.

The Hôtel de Ville was completed in 1977.

== Population ==
Historical population

Year	Pop.	±% p.a.
1793	568	—
1800	573	+0.13%
1806	559	−0.41%
1821	526	−0.40%
1831	652	+2.17%
1836	545	−3.52%
1841	496	−1.87%
1846	525	+1.14%
1851	566	+1.52%
1856	686	+3.92%
1861	754	+1.91%
1866	942	+4.55%
1872	825	−2.19%
1876	982	+4.45%
1881	1,112	+2.52%
1886	1,194	+1.43%
1891	1,339	+2.32%
1896	1,561	+3.12%
1901	1,706	+1.79%

Year	Pop.	±% p.a.
1906	1,888	+2.05%
1911	2,019	+1.35%
1921	2,367	+1.60%
1926	2,966	+4.62%
1931	3,682	+4.42%
1936	3,893	+1.12%
1946	9,179	+8.96%
1954	14,269	+5.67%
1962	24,756	+7.13%
1968	27,484	+1.76%
1975	30,497	+1.50%
1982	28,580	−0.92%
1990	29,197	+0.27%
1999	30,621	+0.53%
2007	31,946	+0.53%
2012	32,198	+0.16%
2017	33,286	+0.67%
2023	35,825	+1.23%

Source: EHESS and INSEE (1968-2023)

== Transportation ==
Châtenay-Malabry is served by Robinson station on Paris RER line B. This station is located at the border between the commune of Châtenay-Malabry and the commune of Sceaux, on the Sceaux side of the border.

== Education ==
Schools include:

- Seven public preschools (maternelles): Jean-Jaurès, Jules-Verne, des Mouilleboeufs, Pierre-Brossolette, Pierre-Mendès-France, Thomas-Masaryk, and Suzanne-Buisson
- Seven public elementary schools: Jean-Jaurès, Jules-Verne, des Mouilleboeufs, Pierre-Brossolette, Pierre-Mendès-France, Thomas-Masaryk, and Léonard-de-Vinci.
- Public junior high schools (collèges): Léonard-de-Vinci, Pierre-Brossolette, Thomas-Masaryk
- Public senior high schools: Lycée Emmanuel-Mounier and Lycée polyvalent Jean-Jaurès
- Private school: Groupe scolaire Sophie-Barat (elementary through senior high)

== Notable people ==
- Voltaire (1694–1778) spent time at Chatenay in 1719, and was probably born out of wedlock there in 1694
- François-René de Chateaubriand (1768–1848) writer, politician and diplomat
- Marie Recio (1814–1862), mezzo-soprano, second wife of composer Hector Berlioz
- Sully Prudhomme (1839–1907), poet and essayist, winner of the first Nobel Prize in Literature, 1901
- Louise Janin (1893–1997), painter
- Jean Fautrier (1898–1964), painter and sculptor
- Emmanuel Mounier (1905–1950), Christian philosopher
- Paul Ricoeur (1913–2005), Christian philosopher
- Grégoire Colin (born 1975), movie actor
- Jérôme Rothen (born 1978), international football player
- Aurélia Aurita (born 1980), comic book author
- Clémence Poésy (born 1982), actress and model
- Hugo Duminil-Copin (born 1985), mathematician
- Hatem Ben Arfa (born 1987), international football player, was raised here
- Khassa Camara (born 1992), footballer
- Laurent Bernard (born 1971), basketball player
- Cyrille Eliezer-Vanerot (born 1996), basketball player
- Nadim Kobeissi (born 1990), computer science researcher specialized in applied cryptography.
- Kévin Malcuit (born 1991), footballer
- Lucile Cypriano (born 1996), racing driver
- Allan Saint-Maximin (born 1997), football player
- Élisa De Almeida (born 1998), football player for France

== Points of interest ==
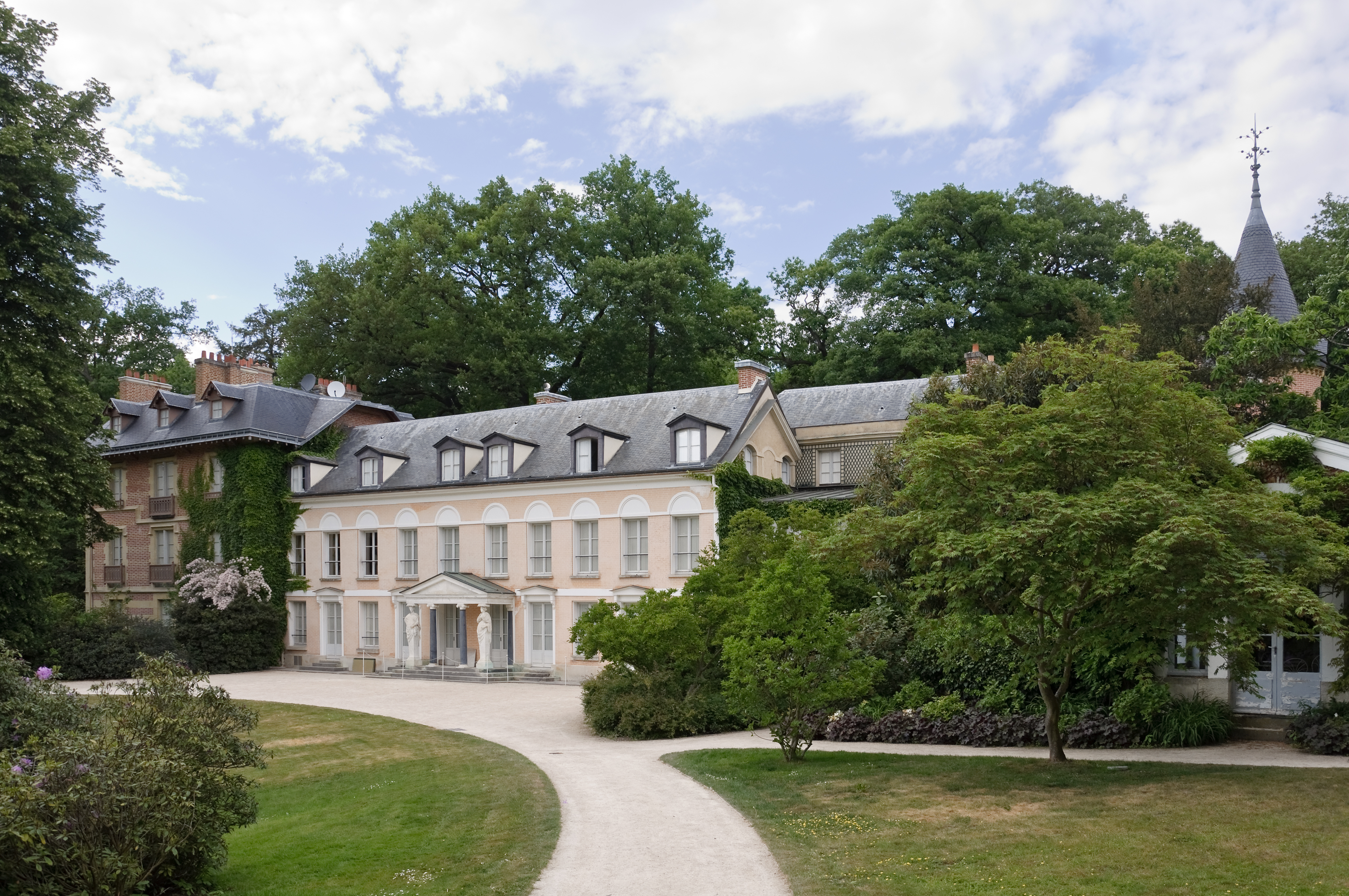
House of Chateaubriand in the Vallée-aux-Loups estate

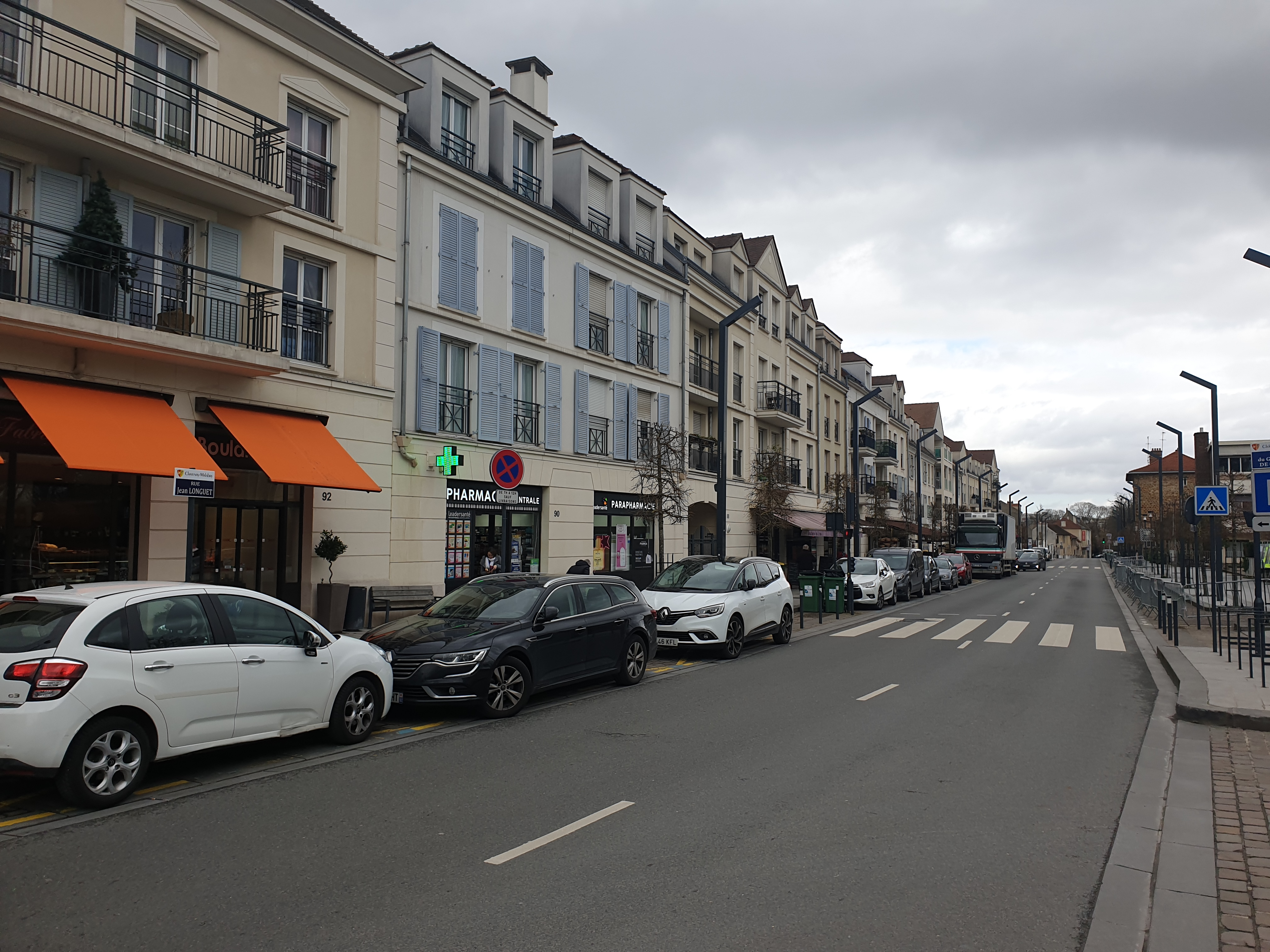
Jean Longuet street at Châtenay-Malabry in March 2020

- Arboretum de la Vallée-aux-Loups

== Twin towns ==
Châtenay-Malabry is twinned with

- Bergneustadt (Oberbergischer Kreis, Germany) since 1967, which is also twinned with Landsmeer
- Landsmeer (North Holland, Netherlands) since 1986, which is also twinned with Bergneustadt
- Wellington (Shropshire, United Kingdom) since 2001
- Bracciano (Bracciano, Italy) since 2011

== See also ==
- Communes of the Hauts-de-Seine department
