= Agglomeration community of Hauts de Bièvre =

Coordinates: 48°45′42″N 02°17′27″E

Hauts de Bièvre
- Former communauté d'agglomération
- Country: France
- Region: Île-de-France
- Department: Essonne, Hauts-de-Seine
- No. of communes: {{{nbcomm}}}
- Disbanded: 2016
- Area: 43.84 km^{2} (16.93 sq mi)
- Population (2012): 184,589
  - Density: 4,211/km^{2} (10,910/sq mi)

The Communauté d'agglomération des Hauts de Bièvre was a Communauté d'agglomération, in France. It covered seven communes: five in the Hauts-de-Seine and two in the Essonne département. It was created in December 2002. It was merged into the Métropole du Grand Paris in January 2016.

Antony was the seat of the Communauté d'agglomération. The Communauté comprised the following communes:

- In the Hauts-de-Seine département:
  - Antony
  - Bourg-la-Reine
  - Châtenay-Malabry
  - Le Plessis-Robinson
  - Sceaux
- In the Essonne département:
  - Verrières-le-Buisson
  - Wissous
