= Marnes-la-Coquette =

- Commune
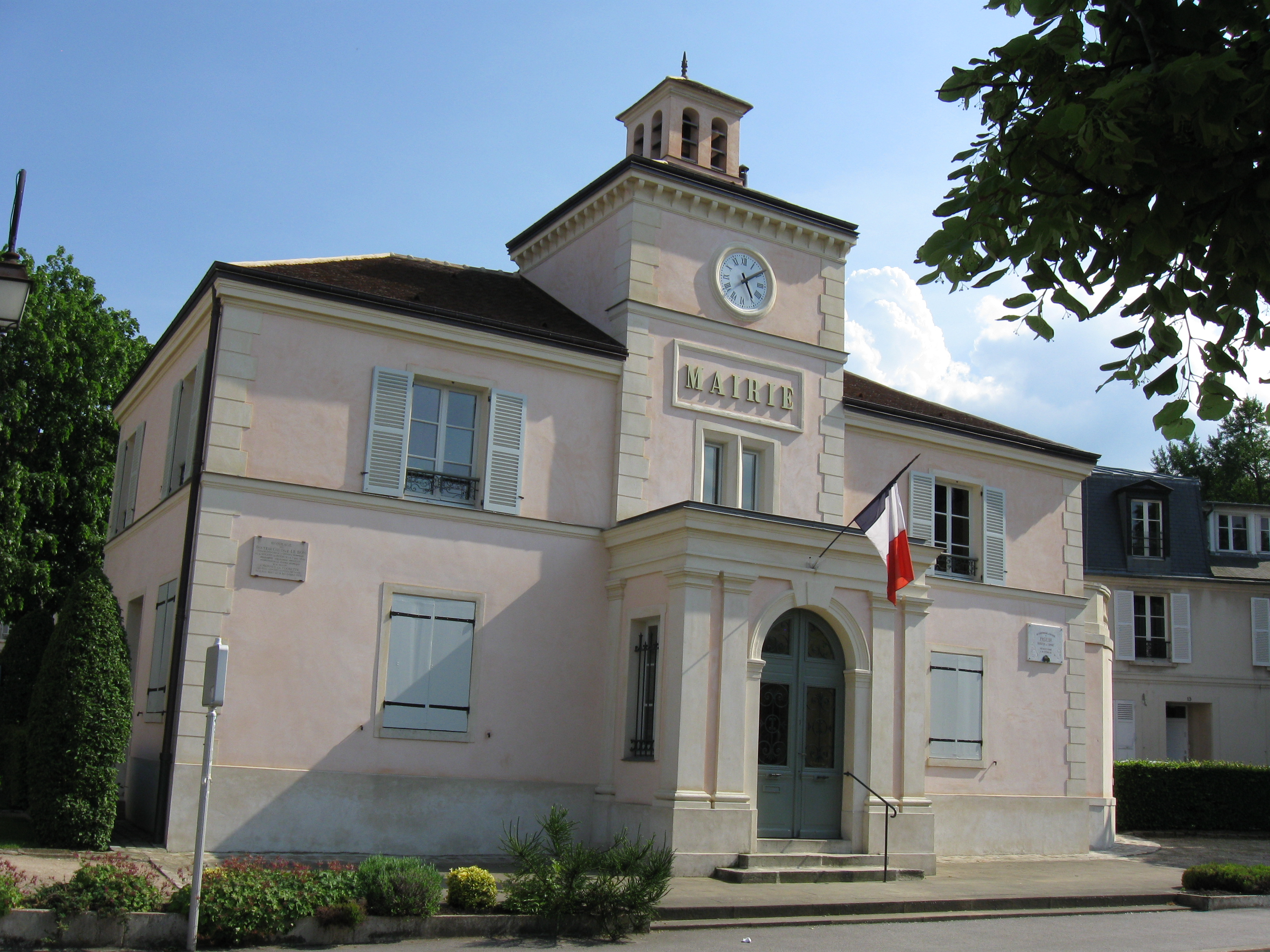
- Marnes-la-Coquette Town Hall

- Coat of arms

- Location (in red) within Paris inner suburbs
- Location of Marnes-la-Coquette
- Location within France Location within Île-de-France (region)
- Coordinates: 48°49′49″N 2°10′38″E
- Country: France
- Region: Île-de-France
- Department: Hauts-de-Seine
- Arrondissement: Boulogne-Billancourt
- Canton: Saint-Cloud
- Intercommunality: Grand Paris

Government
  - Mayor (2026–32): Christiane Barody-Weiss
- Area^{1}: 3.48 km^{2} (1.34 sq mi)
- Population (2023): 1,752
  - Density: 503/km^{2} (1,300/sq mi)
- Time zone: UTC+01:00 (CET)
  - Summer (DST): UTC+02:00 (CEST)
- INSEE/Postal code: 92047 /
- ^{1} French Land Register data, which excludes lakes, ponds, glaciers > 1 km^{2} (0.386 sq mi or 247 acres) and river estuaries.

Marnes-la-Coquette (French pronunciation: [maʁn la kɔkɛt]) is a commune in the western suburbs of Paris, France. Located 13.1 km (8.1 mi) from the centre of Paris, the town is situated in the Hauts-de-Seine department on the departmental border with Yvelines between the Parc de Saint-Cloud and the Forest of Fausses-Reposes. This heavily wooded town developed around the area of Villeneuve-l'Étang that belonged to Napoleon III.

Marnes-la-Coquette has the tenth-highest average household income in France, at €94,320 per year in 2020.

== History ==
The small town of Marnes was formed sometime in the late 12th century when the French bishop Eudes de Sully created a village in the middle of a forest that belonged to him. The name Marnes came from the French translation of Marl clay limestone, since marl was located within the ground there.

In 1852, Louis-Napoléon Bonaparte, then President, bought the estate of Saint-Cloud. This area had once belonged to French Marshal of the Empire Jean-de-Dieu Soult and the Duchess of Angoulême during the First Empire. Upon becoming emperor, he built a castle for the imperial guards. In 1859-1860 he built the church of Sainte-Eugénie, at the center of town in honor of his wife Eugénie de Montijo, who liked the place. That same year, Marnes was authorized by decree of now-Emperor Napoleon III to take the name of Marnes-la-Coquette. The town also took the name Marnes-lès-Saint-Cloud, since it was a dependency of Saint-Cloud for some time. In 1878, the area became public and the castle was destroyed in the 1880s.

A portion of the area of Marnes-la-Coquette was granted to Louis Pasteur in order for him to continue his research after his discovery of the vaccine against rabies in 1885. The experiments required many rabbits and dogs to be caged, which became too much of a nuisance for the neighborhood around Pasteur's animal-house on Rue d'Ulm (5th arrondissement) in Paris. Pasteur then built his laboratory in the former location of the imperial guard house. He planned to build an institute there, but his international success allowed Pasteur to acquire land on Rue Dutot in Paris and later build the Pasteur Institute in 1888.

Villeneuve-l'Étang later on became an annex where Pasteur stayed and worked during summer. He died there on 28 September 1895 where his room is still preserved.

== Population ==
Historical population
Year	Pop.	±% p.a.
1968	1,697	—
1975	1,646	−0.43%
1982	1,632	−0.12%
1990	1,594	−0.29%
1999	1,519	−0.53%
2007	1,696	+1.39%
2012	1,634	−0.74%
2017	1,810	+2.07%
2023	1,752	−0.54%
Source: INSEE

== Transport ==
Marnes-la-Coquette is served by Garches–Marnes-la-Coquette station on the Transilien Paris-Saint-Lazare suburban rail line.

== Education ==
Public primary schools in the commune include École Primaire Maurice Chevalier and École de la Marche. Students in junior high school may attend Collège Yves du Manoir in Vaucresson and/or Collège La Fontaine du Roy in Ville d'Avray, and high school/sixth-form students may attend Lycée Alexandre Dumas in Saint-Cloud.

== Politics ==
In the 2005 referendum on the Constitutional Treaty for Europe on May 29, 2005, the Marnois overwhelmingly voted for the European Constitution with 82.04% approving, and 17.96% against, with an abstention rate of 22.00%.

In the French presidential election of 2007, Nicolas Sarkozy won the first round with 59.33% (566 votes), followed by François Bayrou with 16.88% (161 votes), Ségolène Royal with 12.37% (118 votes), and finally Jean-Marie Le Pen with 5.03% (48 votes). In the second round of voting, the Marnois voted 79.10% (742 votes) for Nicolas Sarkozy and 20.90% (196 votes) for Ségolène Royal, a result more overwhelming than the national average 53.06% for Nicolas Sarkozy. Of the 1,054 registered voters, 90,99% (959 people) voted.

== See also ==
- Communes of the Hauts-de-Seine department
