= Arrondissement of Boulogne-Billancourt =

Coordinates: 48°50′09″N 2°14′18″E

Boulogne-Billancourt
- Arrondissement
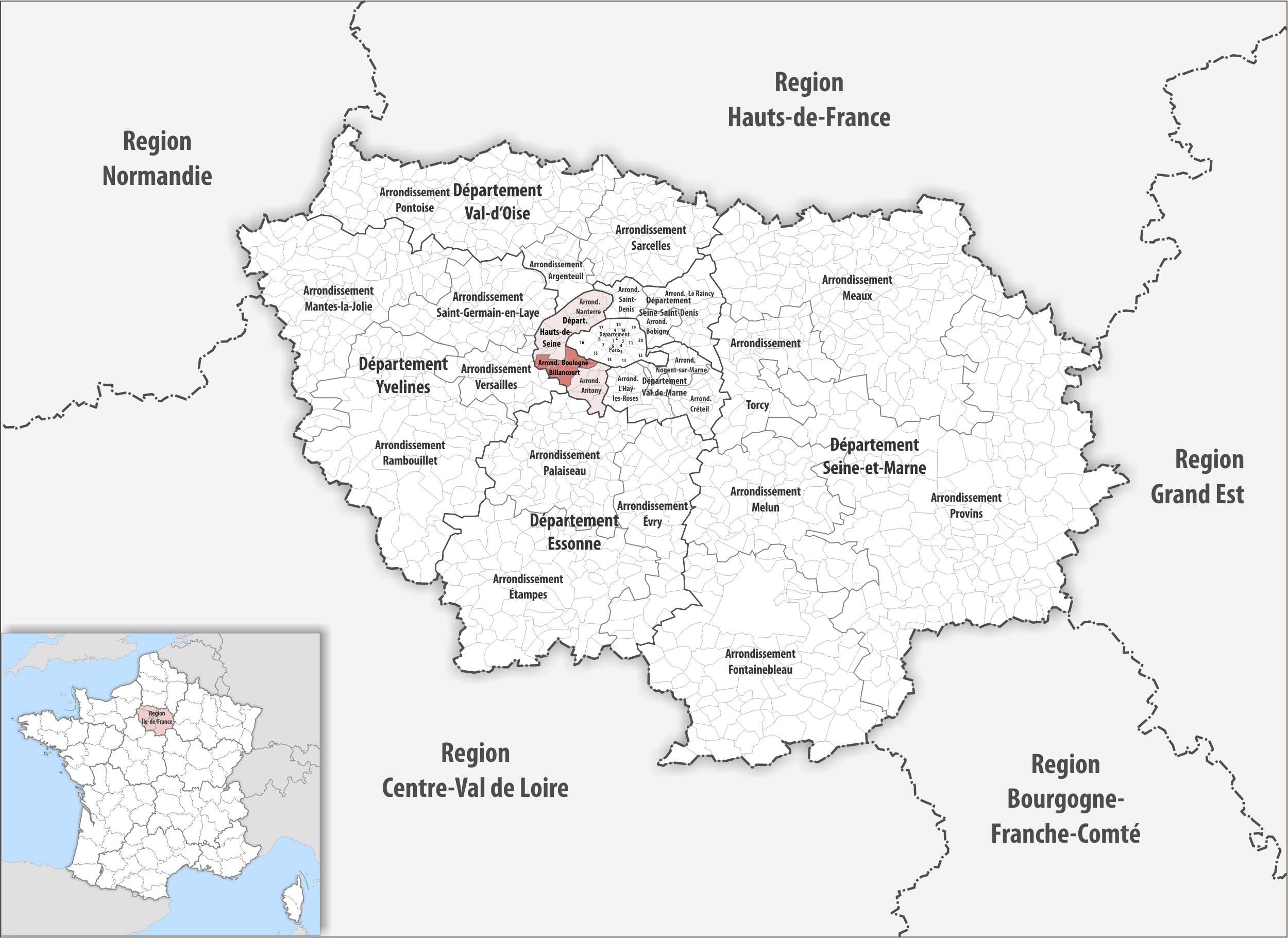
- Location within the region Île-de-France
- Country: France
- Region: Île-de-France
- Department: Hauts-de-Seine
- No. of communes: {{{nbcomm}}}
- Area: 36.5 km^{2} (14.1 sq mi)
- Population (2023): 317,382
  - Density: 8,700/km^{2} (22,500/sq mi)
- INSEE code: 923

The arrondissement of Boulogne-Billancourt is an arrondissement of France in the Hauts-de-Seine department in the Île-de-France region. It has 8 communes. Its population is 317,792 (2021), and its area is 36.5 km^{2} (14.1 sq mi).

== Composition ==
The communes of the arrondissement of Boulogne-Billancourt, and their INSEE codes, are:

1. Boulogne-Billancourt (92012)
2. Chaville (92022)
3. Issy-les-Moulineaux (92040)
4. Marnes-la-Coquette (92047)
5. Meudon (92048)
6. Sèvres (92072)
7. Vanves (92075)
8. Ville-d'Avray (92077)

== History ==
The arrondissement of Boulogne-Billancourt was created in January 1973. At the January 2017 reorganisation of the arrondissements of Hauts-de-Seine, it received one commune from the arrondissement of Antony, and it lost two communes to the arrondissement of Nanterre.

As a result of the reorganisation of the cantons of France which came into effect in 2015, the borders of the cantons are no longer related to the borders of the arrondissements. The cantons of the arrondissement of Boulogne-Billancourt were, as of January 2015:

1. Boulogne-Billancourt-Nord-Est
2. Boulogne-Billancourt-Nord-Ouest
3. Boulogne-Billancourt-Sud
4. Chaville
5. Issy-les-Moulineaux-Est
6. Issy-les-Moulineaux-Ouest
7. Meudon
8. Saint-Cloud
9. Sèvres
