= Canton of Saint-Cloud =

Administrative division of Hauts-de-Seine, France

Coordinates: 48.84°N 2.21°E

The canton of Saint-Cloud is an administrative division of the Hauts-de-Seine department in northern France. Its borders were modified at the French canton reorganisation which came into effect in March 2015. Its seat is in Saint-Cloud. It lies within two arrondissements, Nanterre and Boulogne-Billancourt.

It consists of the following communes:

1. Garches
2. Marnes-la-Coquette
3. Saint-Cloud
4. Vaucresson
5. Ville-d'Avray
