= Chaville =

- Commune
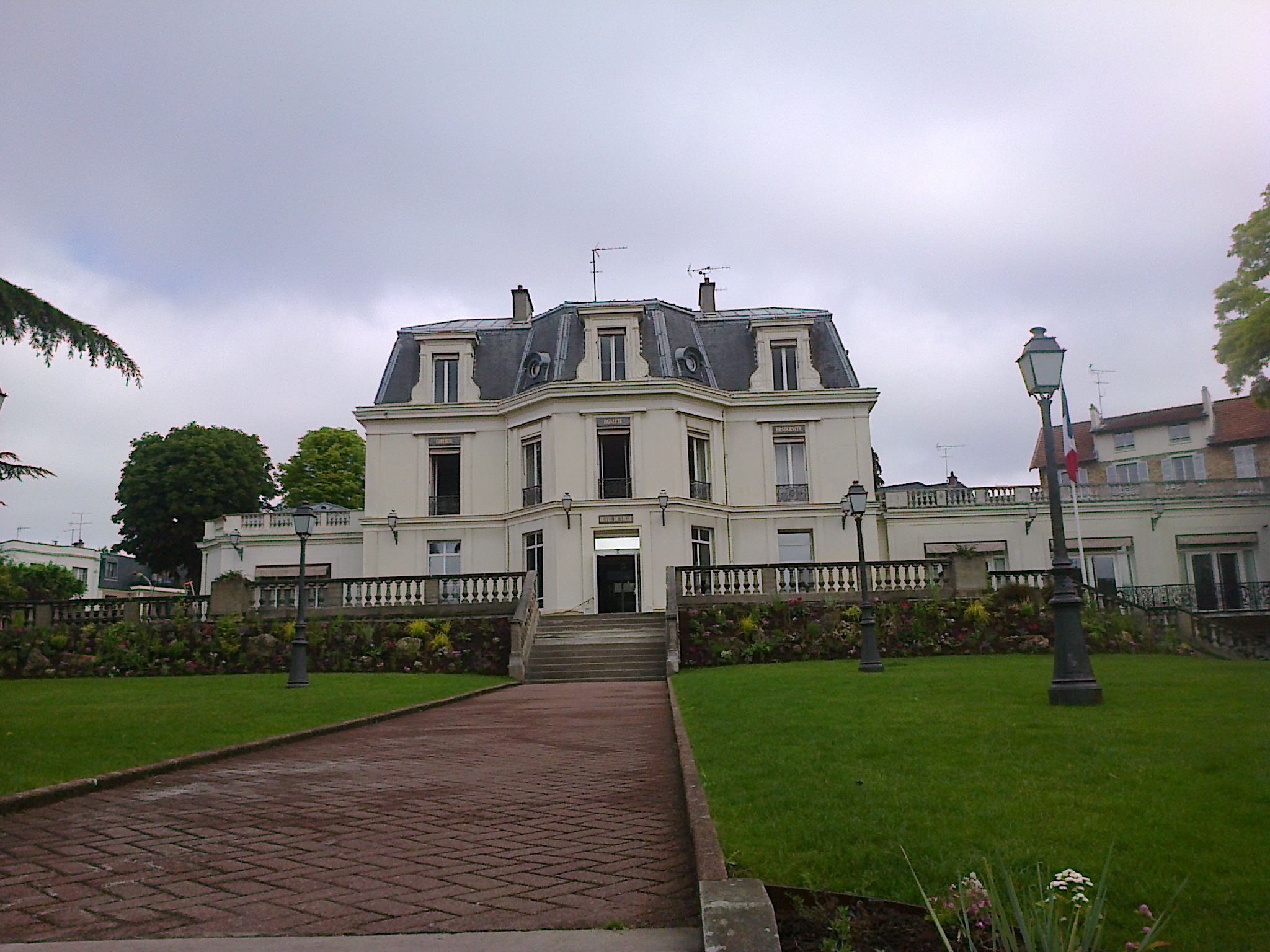
- The Hôtel de Ville

- Coat of arms

- Location (in red) within Paris inner suburbs
- Location of Chaville
- Location within France Location within Île-de-France (region)
- Coordinates: 48°48′31″N 2°11′19″E
- Country: France
- Region: Île-de-France
- Department: Hauts-de-Seine
- Arrondissement: Boulogne-Billancourt
- Canton: Meudon
- Intercommunality: Grand Paris; EPT Grand Paris Seine Ouest

Government
  - Mayor (2026–32): Thierry Besançon
- Area^{1}: 3.55 km^{2} (1.37 sq mi)
- Highest elevation: 173 m (568 ft)
- Lowest elevation: 63 m (207 ft)
- Population (2023): 20,594
  - Density: 5,800/km^{2} (15,000/sq mi)
- Time zone: UTC+01:00 (CET)
  - Summer (DST): UTC+02:00 (CEST)
- INSEE/Postal code: 92022 /92370
- ^{1} French Land Register data, which excludes lakes, ponds, glaciers > 1 km^{2} (0.386 sq mi or 247 acres) and river estuaries.

Chaville (French pronunciation: [ʃavil]) is a commune in the Hauts-de-Seine department and Île-de-France region of north-central France. It lies some 12 kilometres (7.5 mi) from the centre of Paris in the south-western suburbs of the French capital.

== Geography ==
Chaville is bordered by the following communes (clockwise from the north):

- Sèvres
- Meudon
- Vélizy-Villacoublay
- Viroflay
- Ville-d'Avray.

Roughly 44% of the territory of the commune, situated between the forest of Meudon to the south-east and the forest of Fausses-Reposes to the north-west, is wooded.

== History ==
Chaville was founded in the 9th century by Inchadus, Bishop of Paris. The earliest recorded form of the name is Inchadi villa. The Hôtel de Ville was commissioned as a hunting lodge and completed in 1814.

== Population ==
Historical population

Year	Pop.	±% p.a.
1793	537	—
1800	537	+0.00%
1806	650	+3.23%
1821	794	+1.34%
1831	1,385	+5.72%
1836	1,526	+1.96%
1841	1,562	+0.47%
1846	1,770	+2.53%
1851	1,806	+0.40%
1856	1,822	+0.18%
1861	2,330	+5.04%
1866	2,543	+1.76%
1872	2,310	−1.59%
1876	2,361	+0.55%
1881	2,564	+1.66%
1886	2,924	+2.66%
1891	2,842	−0.57%
1896	3,028	+1.28%
1901	3,633	+3.71%

Year	Pop.	±% p.a.
1906	3,758	+0.68%
1911	4,321	+2.83%
1921	6,465	+4.11%
1926	8,727	+6.18%
1931	10,948	+4.64%
1936	12,474	+2.64%
1946	13,226	+0.59%
1954	14,508	+1.16%
1962	16,787	+1.84%
1968	17,476	+0.67%
1975	19,086	+1.27%
1982	17,914	−0.90%
1990	17,784	−0.09%
1999	17,966	+0.11%
2007	18,576	+0.42%
2012	19,343	+0.81%
2017	20,520	+1.19%
2023	20,594	+0.06%

Source: EHESS and INSEE (1968-2023)

== Transport ==
Chaville is located on route D910 between Paris and Versailles. It is served by three railway stations and one bus line:

- Chaville Rive Droite station, on the Transilien suburban rail line from Paris-Saint-Lazare to Versailles Rive Droite
- Chaville Rive Gauche station, on the Transilien suburban rail line from Paris-Montparnasse to Rambouillet
- Chaville–Vélizy station on Paris RER line C
- RATP Bus line 171

== Education ==
As of 2016 there are five preschools (maternelles) with 730 students total: Les Iris, Les Jacinthes, Le Muguet, Les Myosotis, and Les Pâquerettes As of the same year there are three elementary schools with 1,000 students total: Anatole France, Paul Bert, and Ferdinand Buisson. There is one junior high school, Collège Jean Moulin de Chaville.

There is a private elementary school through high school, Institut Saint-Thomas de Villeneuve, in Chaville.

It is served by the public high school/sixth-form college Lycée Jean Pierre Vernant in Sèvres.

== Twin towns ==
- Alsfeld, Hesse, Germany
- Barnet, London, England, United Kingdom
- Settimo Torinese, Piedmont, Italy
- Thanh Hóa, Vietnam
- Mountain Lakes, New Jersey, United States

== See also ==
- Communes of the Hauts-de-Seine department
