= Rueil-Malmaison =

- Commune
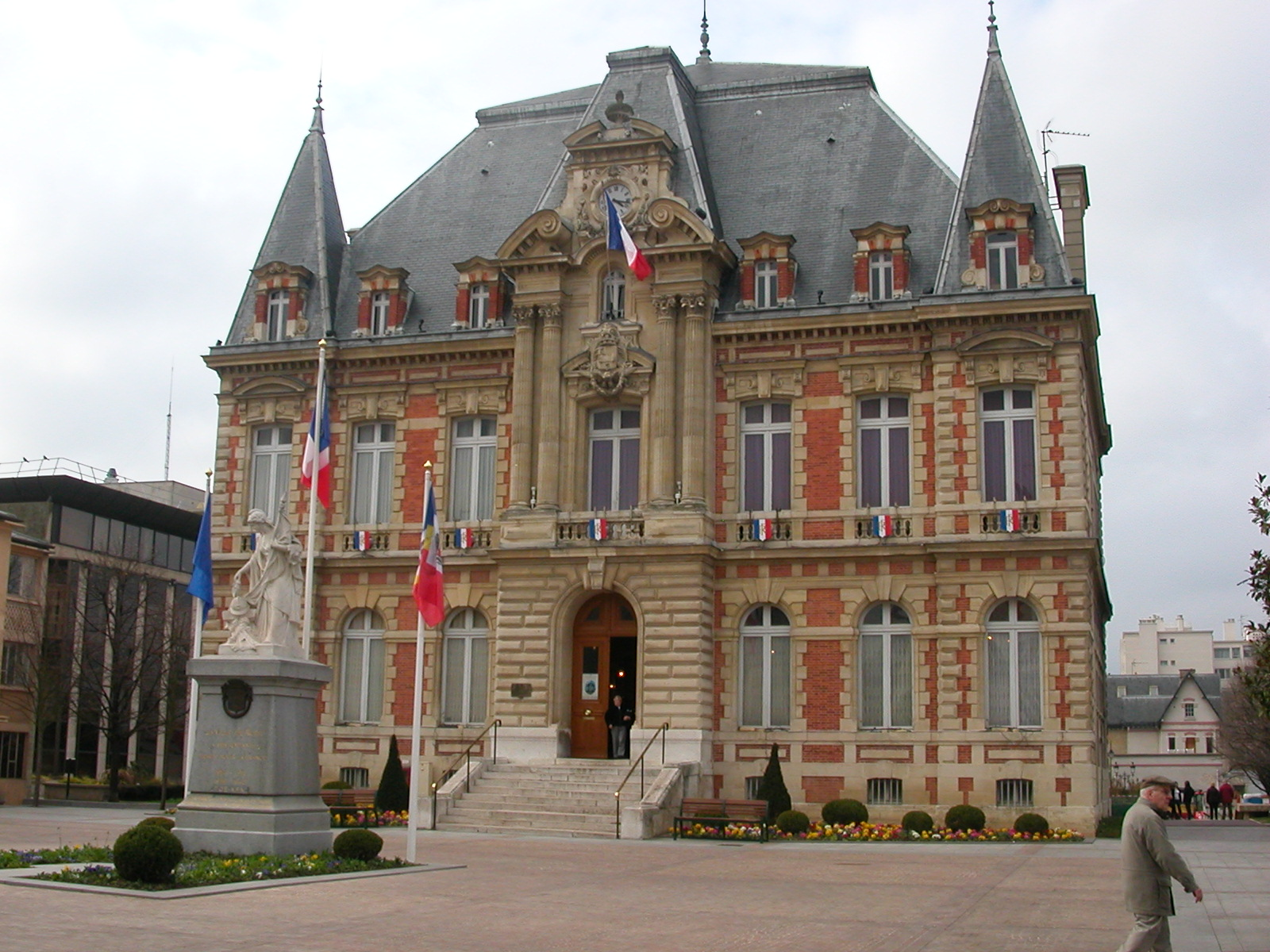
- Town hall

- Coat of arms

- Location (in red) within Paris inner suburbs
- Location of Rueil-Malmaison
- Location within France Location within Île-de-France (region)
- Coordinates: 48°52′34″N 2°10′52″E
- Country: France
- Region: Île-de-France
- Department: Hauts-de-Seine
- Arrondissement: Nanterre
- Canton: Rueil-Malmaison
- Intercommunality: Grand Paris

Government
  - Mayor (2026–32): Patrick Ollier (LR)
- Area^{1}: 14.7 km^{2} (5.7 sq mi)
- Population (2023): 82,874
  - Density: 5,640/km^{2} (14,600/sq mi)
- Demonym: Rueillois
- Time zone: UTC+01:00 (CET)
  - Summer (DST): UTC+02:00 (CEST)
- INSEE/Postal code: 92063 /92500
- Website: www.villederueil.fr
- ^{1} French Land Register data, which excludes lakes, ponds, glaciers > 1 km^{2} (0.386 sq mi or 247 acres) and river estuaries.

Rueil-Malmaison (French pronunciation: [ʁɥɛj malmɛzɔ̃]) or simply Rueil is a commune in the western suburbs of Paris, in the Hauts-de-Seine department, Île-de-France region. It is on the departmental border with Yvelines at the Seine, 12.6 kilometres (8 miles) from the centre of Paris. It is the largest commune in Hauts-de-Seine by area, at 14.7 km^{2} (5.7 sq mi).

Rueil-Malmaison is one of the wealthiest suburbs of Paris. It is best known for its Château de Malmaison, which served as the headquarters of the French government from 1800 to 1802 and Napoleon's last residence in France at the end of the Hundred Days in 1815.

It is part of the Pays des Impressionnistes, who used to paint there along the Seine. Édouard Manet's 1882 The House at Rueil paintings depict a house where Manet and his family stayed.

== Name ==
Rueil-Malmaison was originally called simply Rueil. In medieval times the name Rueil was spelled either Roialum, Riogilum, Rotoialum, Ruolium or Ruellium. This name is made of the Gaulish word ialo (meaning 'clearing, glade' or 'place of') suffixed to a radical meaning 'brook, stream' (Latin: rivus, Old French: rû), or maybe to a radical meaning 'ford' (Celtic ritu).

In 1928, the name of the commune officially became Rueil-Malmaison in reference to its most famous tourist attraction, the Château de Malmaison, home of Napoleon's first wife Joséphine de Beauharnais.

The name Malmaison comes from Medieval Latin mala mansio, meaning 'ill-fated domain', 'estate of ill luck'. In the Early Middle Ages Malmaison was the site of a royal residence which was destroyed by the Vikings in 846.

== History ==
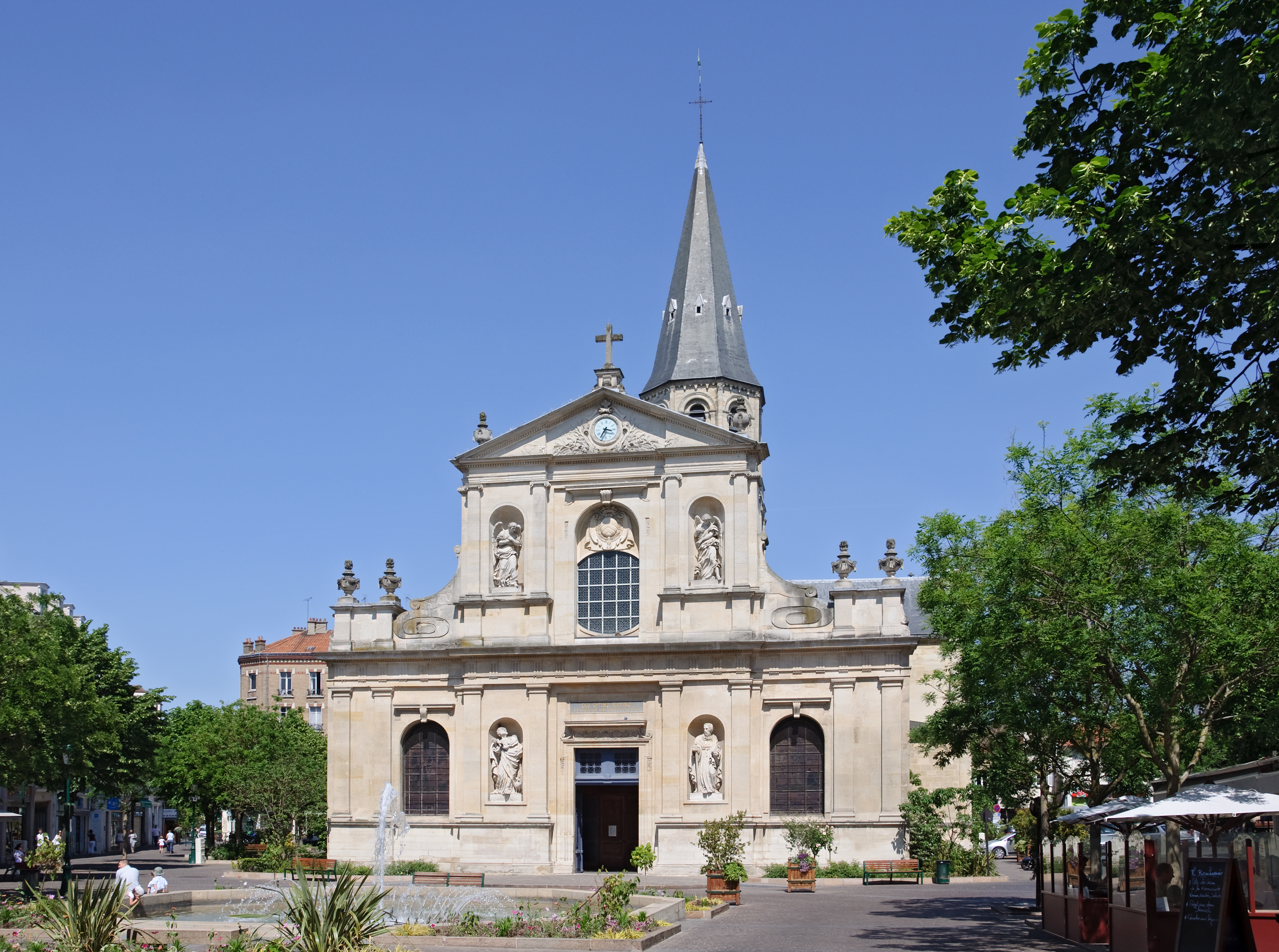
Saint-Pierre-Saint-Paul church

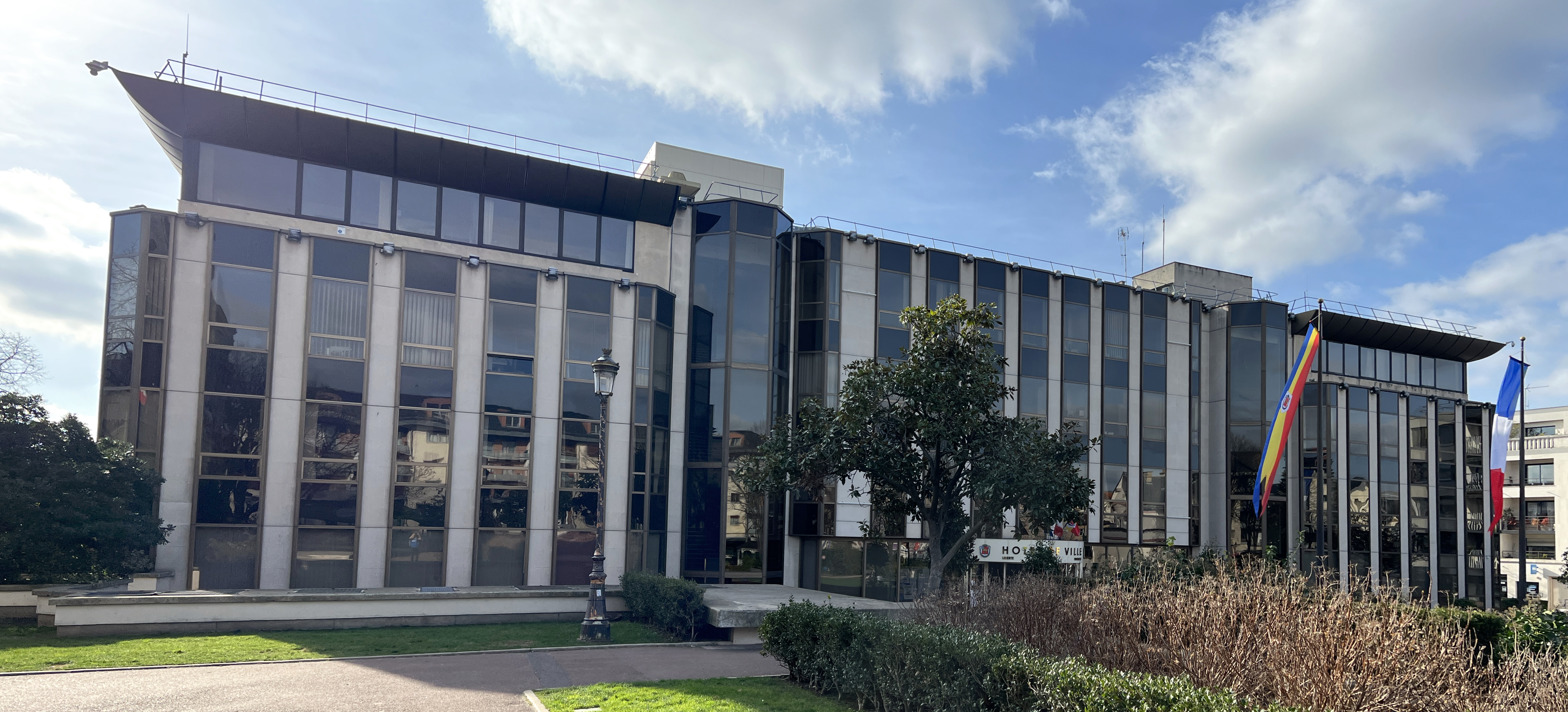
The Hôtel de Ville

The territory of Rueil has been frequented since very ancient times: during foundation work for the construction of a new neighbourhood near the Seine, at the "Closeaux" site, a Mesolithic site of an Azilian people (10,300 to 8,700 BCE) was uncovered. Remains of an Eurasian cave lion, dating back 12,000 years, were also discovered there.

The first historical mention of Rueil, or rather of Rotoialum villae, dates back to the 6th century CE, in the History of the Franks written by Gregory of Tours. The term refers to what was then a Roman-style villa. Also known as Roialum or Rotariolensem villam, it was a place of leisure and hunting for Merovingian kings from the 6th to the 8th century CE. The Rueil barracks of the Swiss Guard were constructed in 1756 under Louis XV by the architect Charles-Axel Guillaumot, and have been classified Monument historique since 1973. The Guard was formed by Louis XIII in 1616 and massacred at the Tuileries on 10 August 1792 during the French Revolution.

Around 870, Charles the Bald gave this estate to the Abbey of Saint-Denis. At the end of the 12th century, Benedictine monks built a chapel dedicated to Saint Cucufa in the former Béranger woods, which later, after the 18th century, became known as the "Saint-Cucufa woods".

During the Edward III's Chevauchée in 1346, Rueil was burned and thoroughly devastated by the Black Prince, taking a long time to recover from this disaster. In 1584, Antoine of Portugal, exiled in France, lived in Rueil and laid the first stone of a church on the site of the old one, which was in ruins.

In 1622, Christophe Perrot, a counsellor to the Parliament of Paris, had a château built on the site called Malmaison, an estate that would become, in the following century, the property of the future Empress Joséphine.

The monks sold the estate in 1633 to Cardinal Richelieu, who settled at the Château du Val, built for Jean Moisset, a financier under Henri IV. Far from the intrigues and noise of the city, it became his favourite residence. Richelieu also funded the completion of the Saint-Pierre-Saint-Paul church by having its façade constructed by his architect Lemercier.

In 1691, the Marquise de Maintenon, the king's secret wife, rented a house in Rueil to receive poor children and provide them with some education. This was the precursor to the institution she would later establish in Saint-Cyr, closer to Versailles.

In 1754, the construction of the barracks, along with those in Courbevoie and Saint-Denis, and the arrival of a Swiss Guards regiment in Rueil significantly increased the population. The Rueil barracks (now the Guynemer barracks, next to the Swiss Guards Museum), built by architect Charles-Axel Guillaumot, is still in use today and is the only one of the three original Swiss Guards barracks that remains.

On 21 April 1799, the Château de Malmaison was purchased by General Bonaparte's wife, Marie-Josèphe Tascher de la Pagerie, widow of the Viscount de Beauharnais and wife of General Bonaparte, who, out of jealousy, called her "Josephine". As the château's owner, Josephine had it renovated by architects Percier and Fontaine. During the Consulate, Napoleon spent considerable time there, both for leisure and work. Decisions made there included, for example, the Louisiana Purchase and the establishment of the Legion of Honour. After their divorce, the Emperor allowed his former wife to retain her title as Empress and her ownership of Malmaison. Deeply fond of the estate, Josephine had heated greenhouses built to pursue her passion for botany. After his defeat, Napoleon abdicated at Fontainebleau and left for exile on 20 April 1814. It was in Rueil, where she had welcomed Tsar Alexander I of Russia and sought his protection, that the former Empress died just over a month later, on 29 May 1814. Her remains were interred in the Saint-Pierre-Saint-Paul Church.

The following year, after the Hundred Days, Anglo-Prussian forces took Rueil and looted it. While the British ransacked Malmaison, the Prussians entered Masséna's property, ravaged the park, stripped the château of all portable items, and smashed the furniture.

In 1866, with the Empire restored and the town having grown, it was decided to build a new town hall. It was also during this period that Emperor Napoleon III funded the partial restoration of Saint-Pierre-Saint-Paul Church, which contained the tombs of his mother and grandmothers and had fallen into disrepair. Rueil also became home to the Infanta Marie-Isabella of Spain, the eldest daughter of Queen Isabella II of Spain, and her husband, Prince Gaetano of Bourbon-Sicily, when the Spanish royal family was exiled by the revolution of 1868.

View of the front of the Stell Hospital, bearing the name of Edward Tuck During the Siege of Paris from 1870 to 1871, in the Franco-Prussian War, Rueil, the surrounding villages, and the Château de Buzenval became battle sites, notably on 21 October 1870, during the first battle of Buzenval, and 19 January 1871 during the second battle of Buzenval, where French troops from Paris clashed with Prussian soldiers entrenched on the Garches heights.

The commune has three war memorials commemorating this conflict. The first, located on Rue du Général-Colonieu, named after an Algerian rifleman officer distinguished in battle, was designed by architect Charles Chipiez at the request of the Seine department in memory of the second battle. It features a large stone shell adorned with garlands. The second, located in the old cemetery, was created by architect Albert Julien and inaugurated in 1886. It is a massive obelisk made of blue granite. On the four sides of the base are bronze medallions sculpted by Antide Péchiné. Finally, the third is situated on Rue du Commandant-Jacquot, behind a doorway framed by two pilasters, on a small walled plot. This is a column topped with a cross. The inscription "Raoul de Kreuznach, 21 October 1870, De profundis" honours this young man of 19, killed shortly after joining the École Spéciale Militaire de Saint-Cyr. His father managed to locate his initial resting place, where he lay among the bodies of other soldiers, and purchased this plot from a local farmer to erect the monument, which he later donated to the State. The association Le Souvenir Français continues to maintain it to this day.

In 1899, an American philanthropic couple, Mr. and Mrs. Tuck, settled in Rueil at the Vermont estate and did much for the town: they funded the construction of the Stell Hospital (named after Mrs. Tuck's maiden name), built schools, and helped to preserve Bois-Préau and the Château de Malmaison.

At that time, Rueil was popular among Parisians for its riverside guinguettes along the Seine, a tradition that dates back to the 1850s, thanks in part to the railway line. Boating on the Seine was also in vogue. Rueil was still a town of market gardening, vineyards and laundries.

During the 1910 Seine flood, Rueil was inundated, like neighbouring towns along the river. On 29 January, the daily newspaper Le Journal wrote: "In Rueil, three infantry battalions arrived yesterday morning to guard properties abandoned by their residents."

Occupied by the Germans in 1940, the town was the site of resistance executions at the Mont-Valérien fort. It was liberated on 19 August 1944. On 23 June 1943, an FTP-MOI commando led by Rino Della Negra attacked the Guynemer barracks.

The new Hôtel de Ville (town hall) was completed in 1978.

== Population ==
Historical population

Year	Pop.	±% p.a.
1793	2,484	—
1800	2,548	+0.36%
1806	2,624	+0.49%
1821	2,524	−0.26%
1831	3,417	+3.08%
1836	3,333	−0.50%
1841	3,761	+2.45%
1846	4,116	+1.82%
1851	5,253	+5.00%
1856	5,399	+0.55%
1861	6,489	+3.75%
1866	7,092	+1.79%
1872	8,216	+2.48%
1876	8,087	−0.39%
1881	8,208	+0.30%
1886	9,364	+2.67%
1891	9,937	+1.19%
1896	9,680	−0.52%
1901	11,013	+2.61%

Year	Pop.	±% p.a.
1906	12,437	+2.46%
1911	13,203	+1.20%
1921	15,842	+1.84%
1926	20,671	+5.47%
1931	24,924	+3.81%
1936	26,796	+1.46%
1946	27,016	+0.08%
1954	32,212	+2.22%
1962	54,786	+6.86%
1968	60,804	+1.75%
1975	62,727	+0.45%
1982	63,412	+0.16%
1990	66,401	+0.58%
1999	73,469	+1.13%
2007	78,145	+0.77%
2012	79,563	+0.36%
2017	78,152	−0.36%
2023	82,874	+0.98%

Source: EHESS and INSEE (1968–2023)

== Sights ==
The Château de Malmaison, the residence of Napoleon's first wife Joséphine de Beauharnais, is located in Rueil-Malmaison. It is home to a Napoleonic museum.

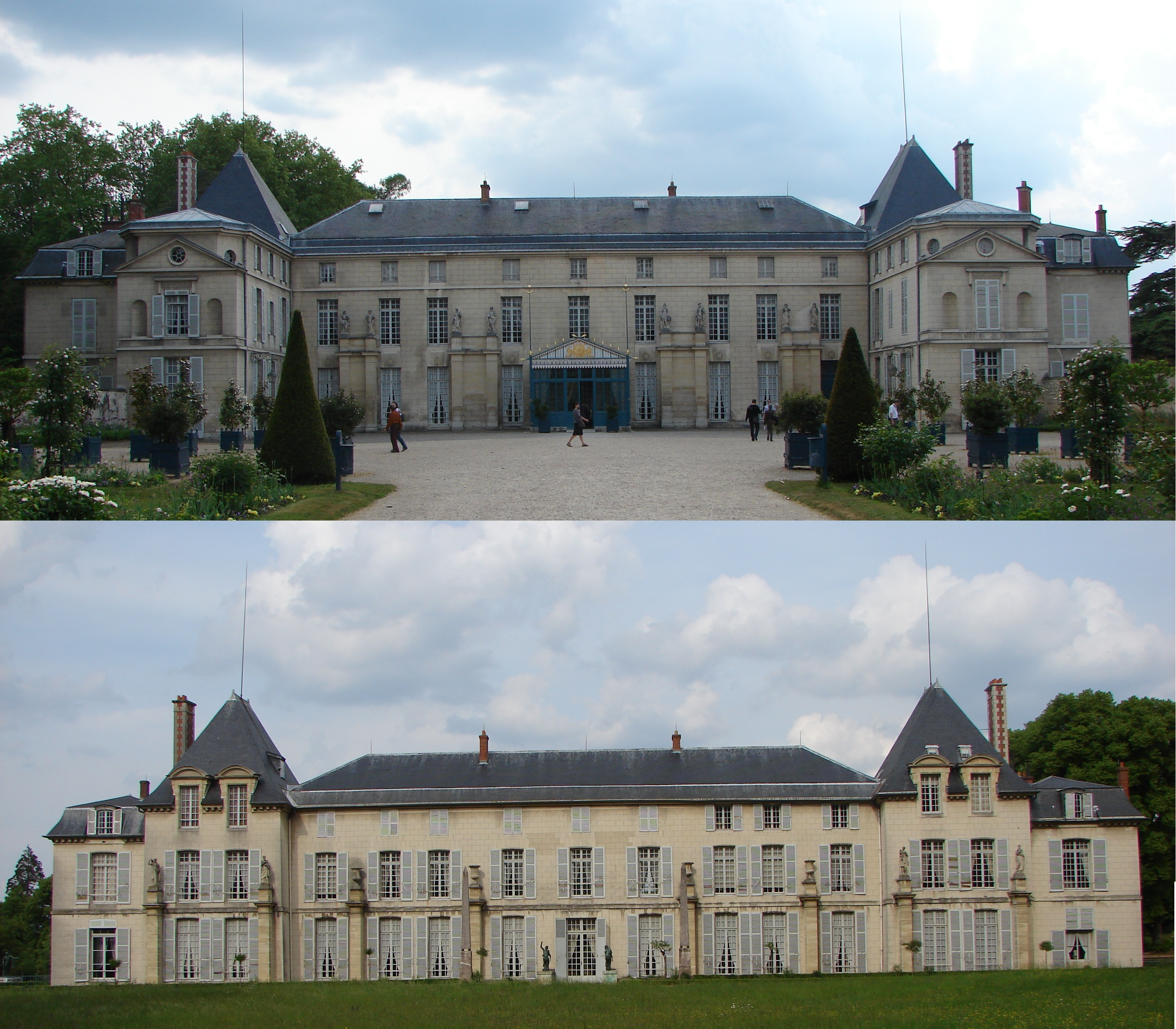
The Château de Malmaison. Upper: north-east facade; lower: south-west facade

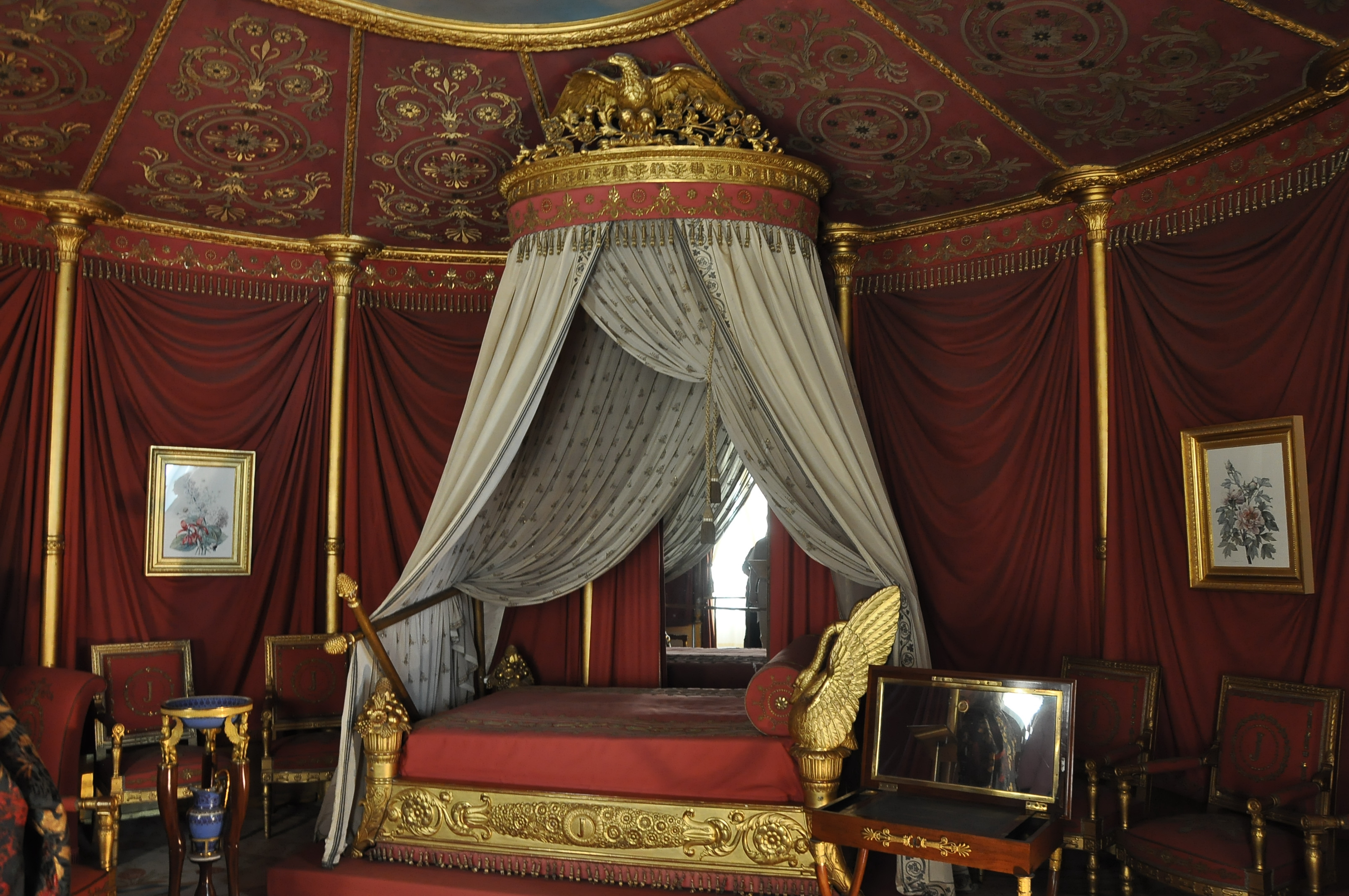
Bedroom of Joséphine de Beauharnais and Napoléon

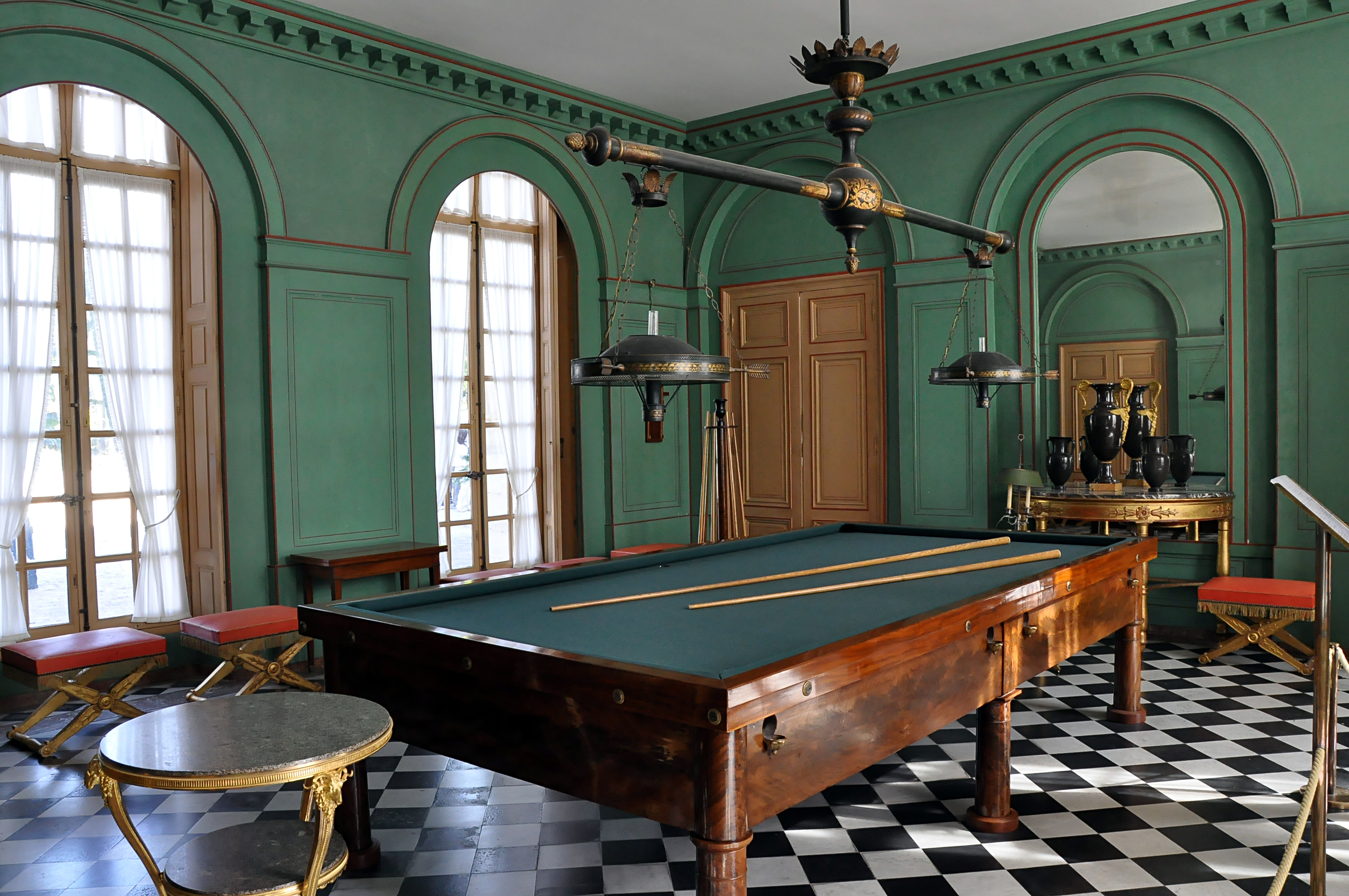
Billiard room

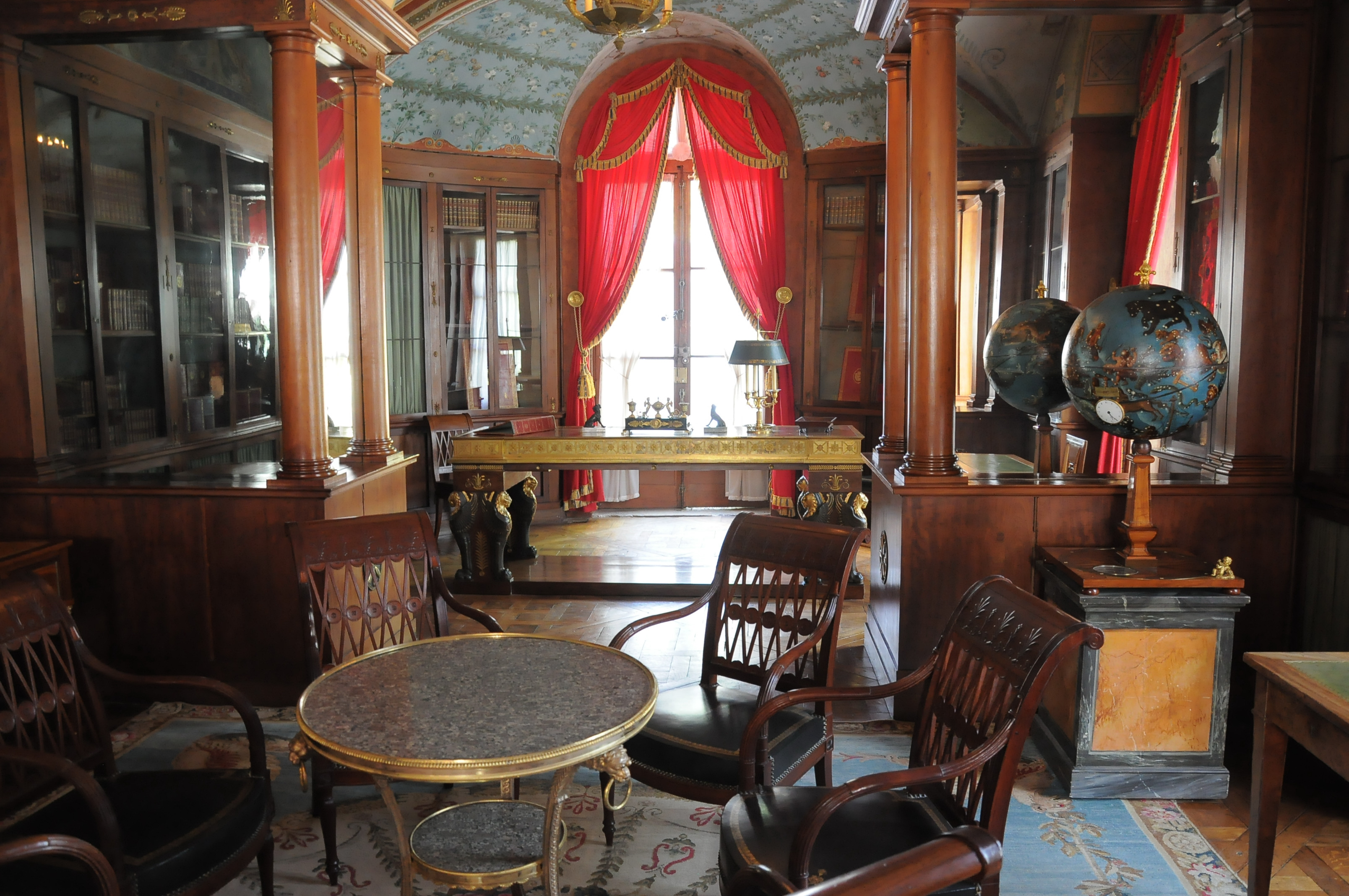
Library of Napoleon

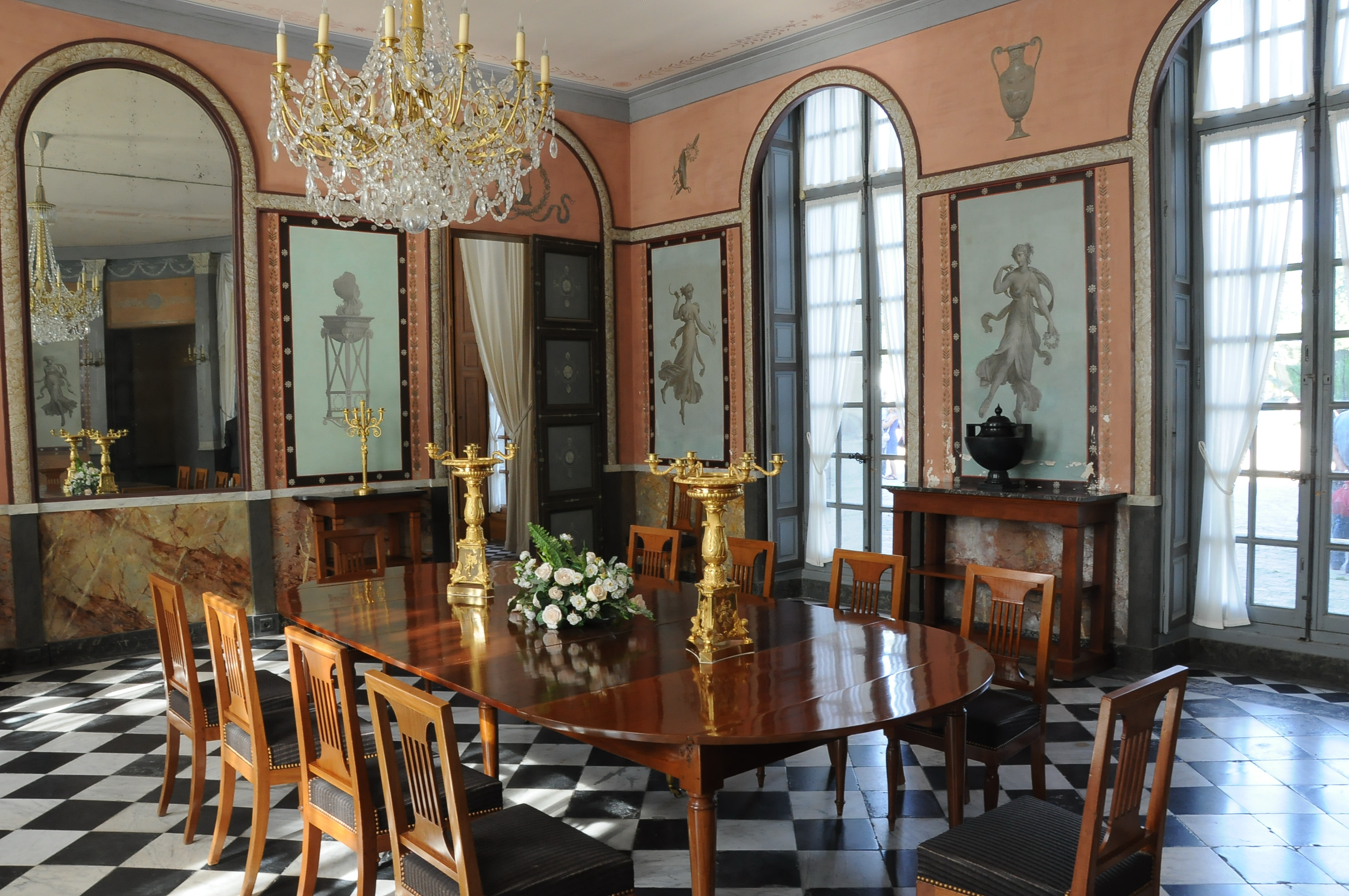
Dining room

Saint-Pierre-Saint-Paul Church housing notable graves.

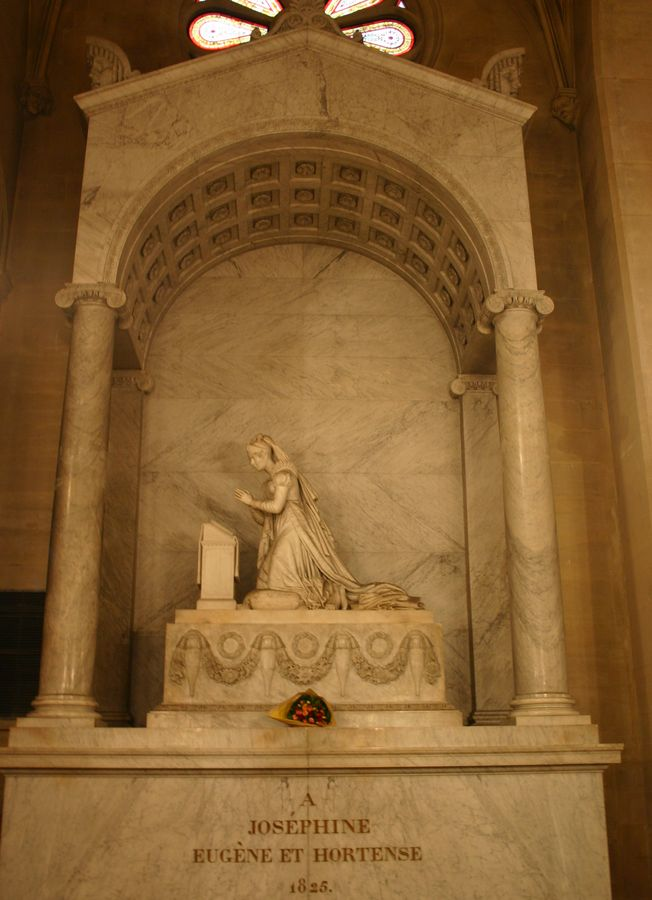
Tomb of Empress Josephine and her two children

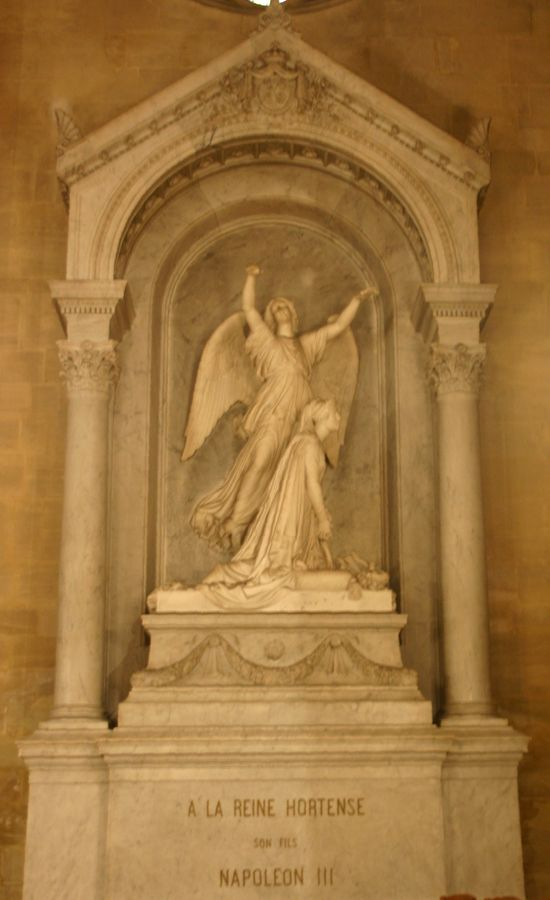
Monument to Queen Hortense

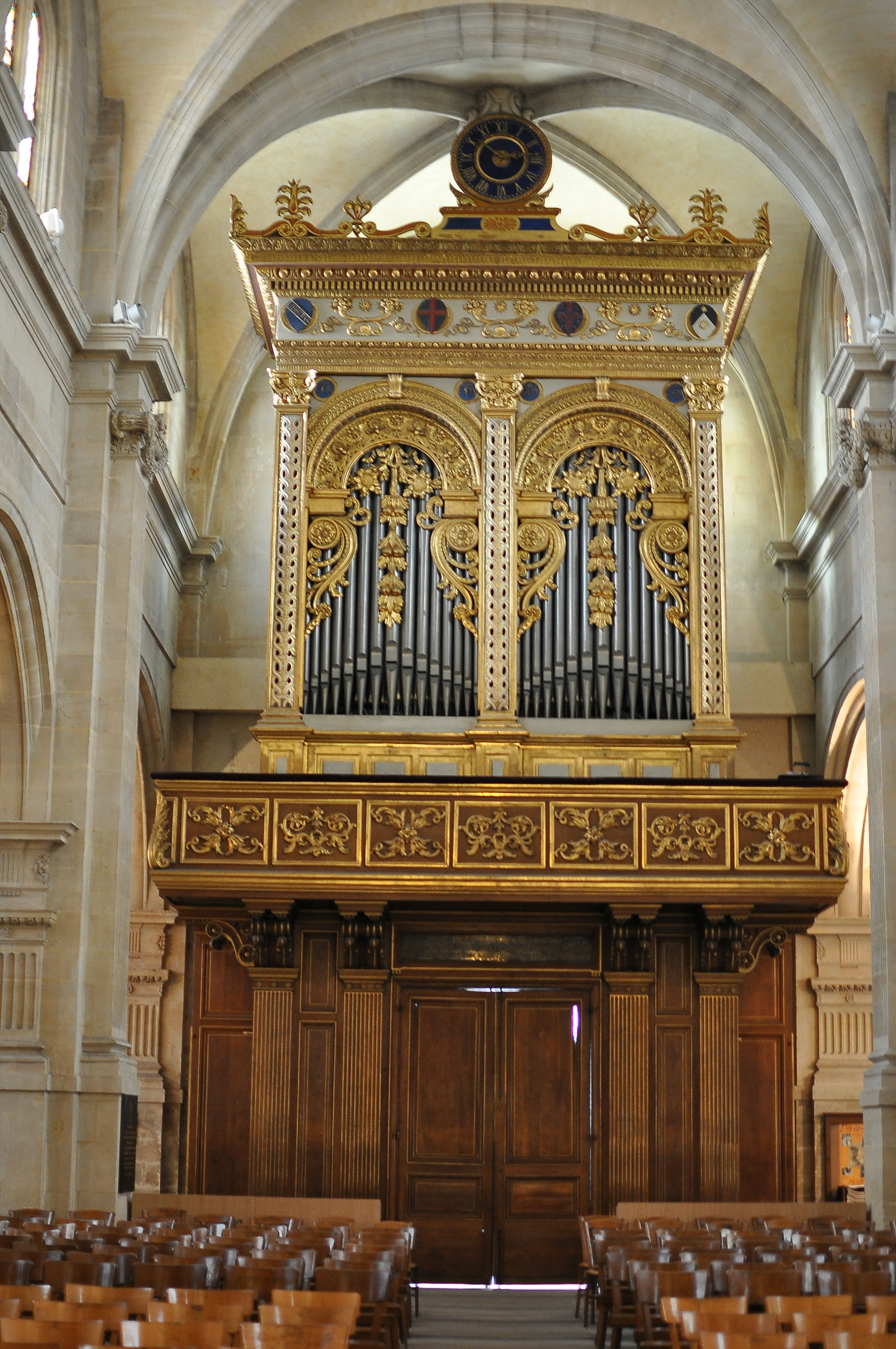
Monumental organ

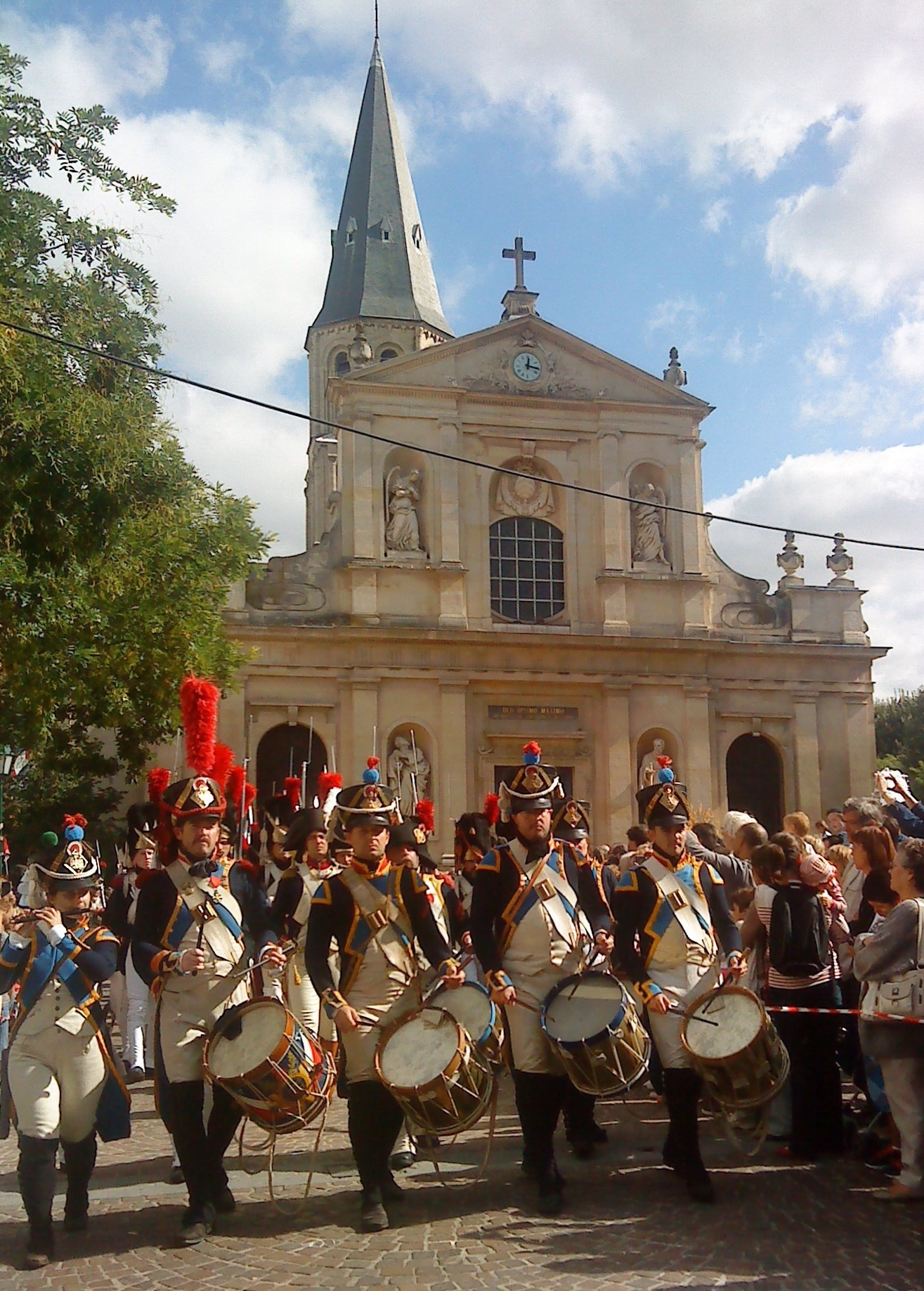
The church in 2012

=== In poetry ===
Lydia Huntley Sigourney's poem Tomb of Josephine. was published in her volume 'Pleasant Memories of Pleasant Lands' published in 1842 and follows her visit to Europe in 1840.

== Economy ==
Office building in the new business district of Rueil-sur-Seine

The main campus of the French Institute of Petroleum research organisation is in Rueil. The city has also become home to many large companies moving out of La Défense business district, located only 5 km (3.1 mi) from Rueil, a trend first established by the move of Esso headquarters to Rueil.

There are about 850 service sector companies located in Rueil, 70 of which employ more than 100 people. A business district called Rueil-sur-Seine (previously known as "Rueil 2000") was created near the RER A Rueil-Malmaison station to accommodate these companies. The business district is equipped with a fibre-optic network.

Several major French companies have their world headquarters in Rueil-Malmaison, such as Schneider Electric and VINCI. Schneider had its head office in Rueil-Malmaison since 2000; previously the building Schneider occupies housed the Schneider subsidiary Télémécanique.

Several large international companies have also located their French headquarters in Rueil-Malmaison, including as ExxonMobil, AstraZeneca, American Express and Unilever.

== Infrastructure ==
=== Transport ===
Rueil-Malmaison is served by Rueil-Malmaison station on RER A. In the future, the commune will be served by the currently under construction Rueil – Suresnes – Mont Valérien station on Paris Métro Line 15 (part of the Grand Paris Express project), which will be located on the border with the commune of Suresnes, as well as a western extension of Île-de-France tramway Line 1.

=== Healthcare ===
The Stell Hospital, a teaching hospital of Sorbonne University, is located in Rueil-Malmaison.

=== Museums ===
The area has a local history museum, the Musée d'histoire locale de Rueil-Malmaison. Since 21 May 2016 it has been home to the Ancient Egyptian mummy of a five-year-old called Ta-Iset.

== Education ==
Public schools:

- 15 preschools
- 15 elementary schools
- Six junior high schools: Les Bons-Raisins, Henri-Dunant, La Malmaison, Les Martinets, Marcel-Pagnol, Jules-Verne
- Two senior high schools: Lycée Richelieu, Lycée polyvalent Gustave-Eiffel

Private schools:

- Collège et lycée Madeleine-Daniélou
- Collège et lycée Passy-Buzenval
- Collège Notre-Dame
- École maternelle et élémentaire Saint-Charles-Notre Dame
- Ecole maternelle élémentaire Charles-Peguy
- Ecole Montessori Bilingue de Rueil-Malmaison

There are tertiary educational institutions in the area.

Engineering college:

- IFP School

== Notable residents ==
- Jean-Marie Le Pen and his wife, Jany Le Pen, used to live in a two-storey house on Rue Hortense.
- N'Golo Kanté grew up in a small flat with his family in Rueil-Malmaison.

== Twin towns – sister cities ==
Rueil-Malmaison is twinned with:

- Ávila, Spain
- Bad Soden, Germany
- Le Bardo, Tunisia
- Bukhara, Uzbekistan, since 1999
- Dubrovnik, Croatia, since 2011
- Elmbridge, England, United Kingdom
- Fribourg, Switzerland
- Helsingør, Denmark
- Jelgava, Latvia, since 2006
- Kiryat Malakhi, Israel, since 1 June 1985
- Kitzbühel, Austria, since 1979
- Lynchburg, United States
- Carmel, Indiana, United States
- Oaxaca, Mexico
- Sarajevo, Bosnia and Herzegovina
- Sergiyev Posad, Russia, since 1989
- Timișoara, Romania
- Tōgane, Japan, since 1990
- Zouk Mikael, Lebanon, since 2009
- Chernivtsi, Ukraine, since 2024

== See also ==
- Communes of the Hauts-de-Seine department
- List of works by Eugène Guillaume
