= Ville-d'Avray (Corot) =

Painting by Jean-Baptiste-Camille Corot

Ville-d’Avray
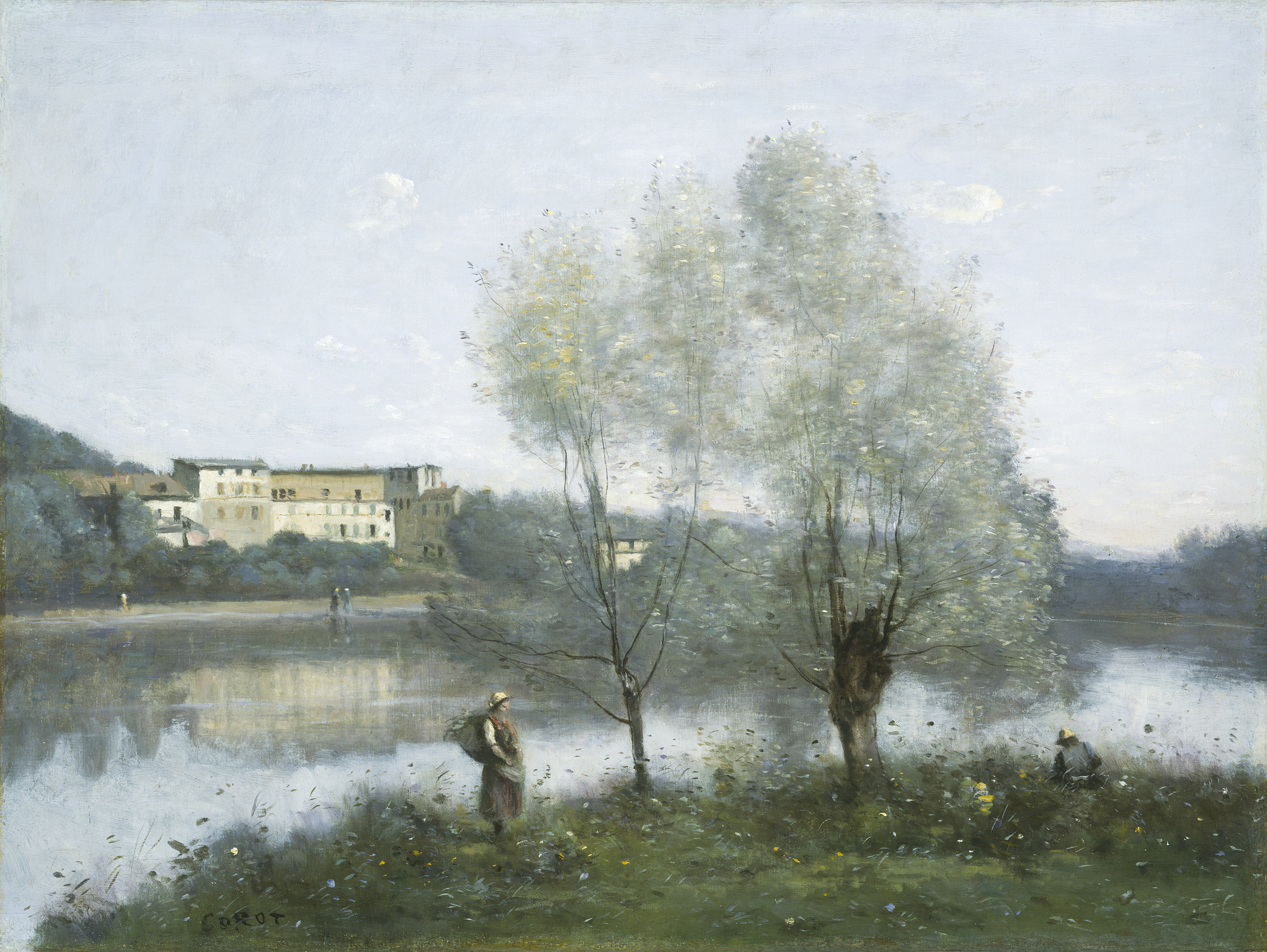
- Artist: Jean-Baptiste-Camille Corot
- Year: 1865
- Medium: oil on canvas
- Dimensions: 49.3 cm × 65.5 cm (19.4 in × 25.8 in)
- Location: National Gallery of Art, Washington D.C.
- Accession: 1955.9.1

Ville-d’Avray is an 1865 oil painting by the French artist Jean-Baptiste-Camille Corot. It is on display at the National Gallery of Art in Washington D.C.

== History ==
In 1817, Corot's father bought a country house in Ville-d'Avray, on the outskirts of Paris, where the painting was made. Ville d'Avray became for Corot the equivalent as the Fontainebleau Forest for the Barbizon artists. Throughout his career, the artist repeatedly painted views of this place.

== Description ==
The painting depicts the calm surface of a pond ("etang") and buildings on the far shore, the figures of peasants, merged with the landscape and engaged in their usual familiar and ordinary activities. The foreground is given to one of Corot's favorite motifs: trees. Most likely, these are willows, which the artist painted quite often.

The use of pastel tones creates an atmosphere of early morning in this landscape. The silver sky is pale, the houses are reflected in the lake, and the sun that illuminates these houses is reminiscent of the picturesque sketches created by Corot in Italy.

The depicted objects are quite prosaic, but Corot makes the landscape evoke in the viewer a feeling of peace and tranquility, while the fullness of light and air originates a sense of graceful dissolution in nature.

== Provenance ==
The painting was donated in 1955 to the National Gallery of Art, in Washington, D.C., by Count Cecil Pecci-Blunt.
