= Hôtel de Ville, Rueil-Malmaison =

Town hall in Rueil-Malmaison, France

Hôtel de Ville
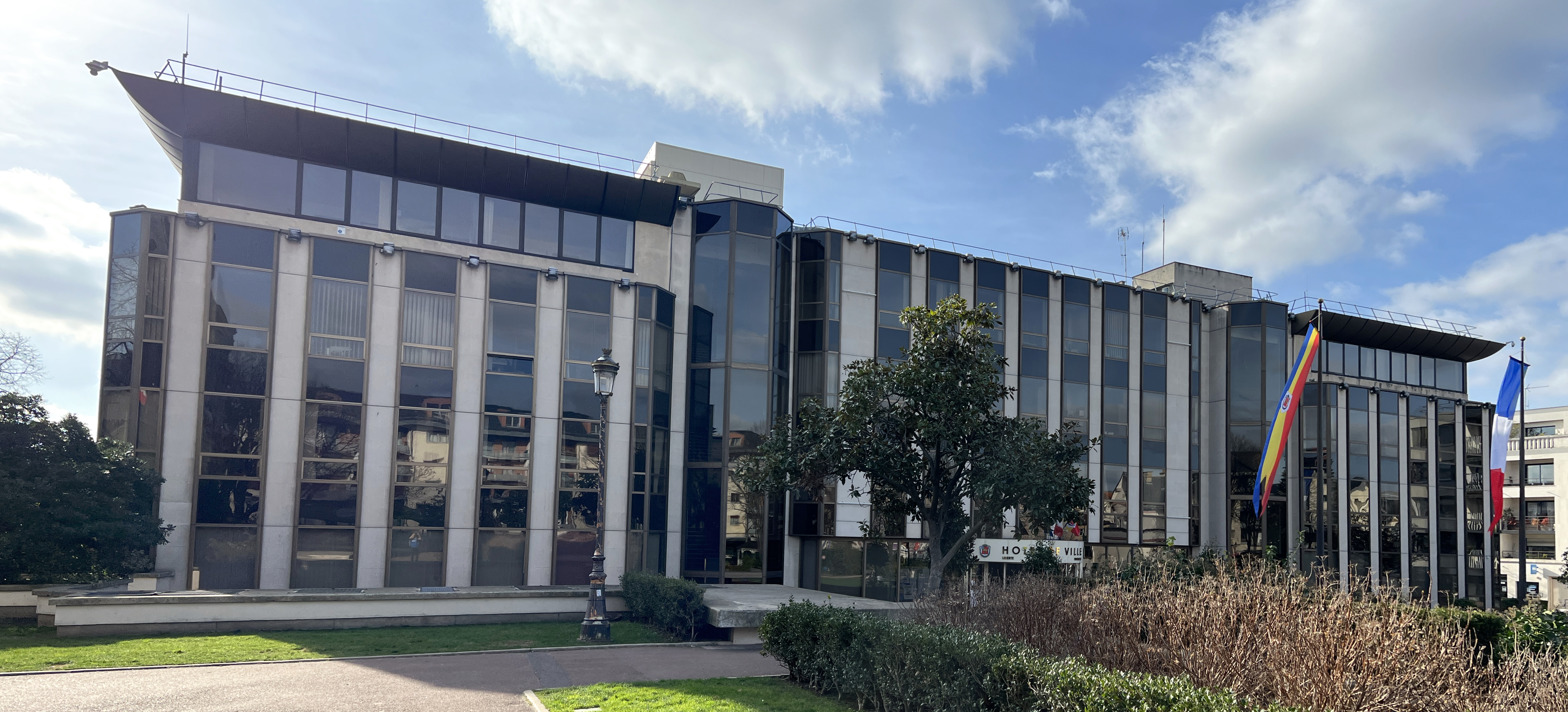
- The main frontage of the Hôtel de Ville in February 2023
- Interactive map of the Hôtel de Ville area

General information
- Type: City hall
- Architectural style: Modern style
- Location: Rueil-Malmaison, France
- Coordinates: 48.8779°N 2.1806°E
- Completed: 1978

The Hôtel de Ville (French pronunciation: [otɛl də vil], City Hall) is a municipal building in Rueil-Malmaison, Hauts-de-Seine, in the western suburbs of Paris, France, standing on Esplanade de la Mairie.

== History ==
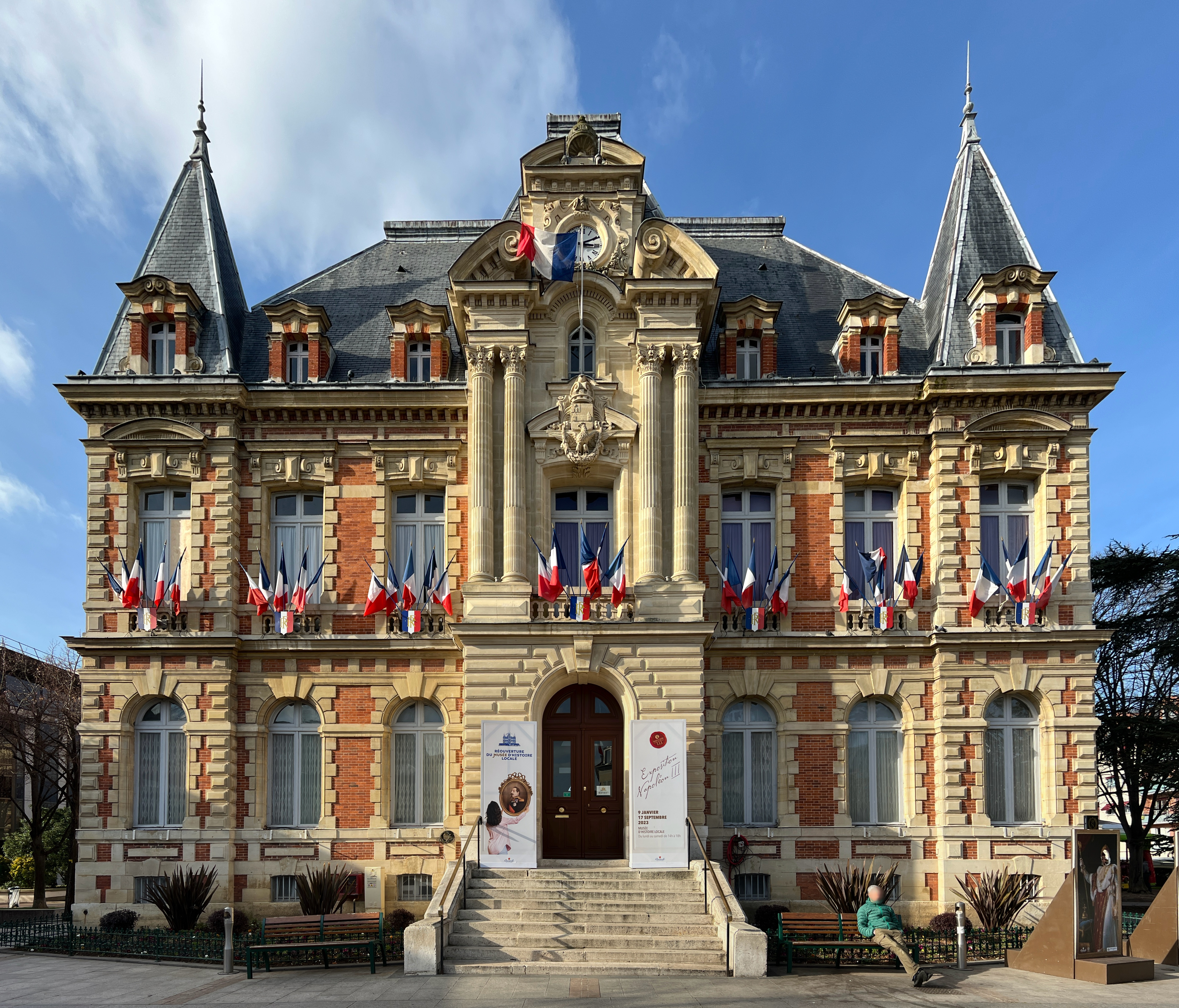
The old town hall

From the French Revolution to the mid-19th century, the town council rented premises for its meetings. In 1866, the town council decided to commission a dedicated town hall. The site they selected was occupied by two private houses, Nos. 6 and 8 on Rue de l'Empereur (now Rue Paul Vaillant-Couturier). The foundation stone for the new building was laid by the mayor, Adrien Cramail, on 24 May 1868. It was designed by Lebois & Prince in the Second Empire style, built in red brick and ashlar stone and was officially opened on 7 November 1869. Napoleon III commemorated the occasion by the grant of a coat of arms to the town.

The design of the building involved a symmetrical main frontage of seven bays facing onto Rue de l'Empereur with the end bays slightly projected forward as pavilions. The central bay, which was also slightly projected forward, featured a short flight of steps leading up to a round headed entrance with a rusticated surround and a keystone. On the first floor, there was French door with a balustraded balcony and a pediment flanked by pairs of Corinthian order columns supporting a cornice, an entablature and an open modillioned pediment containing a clock. The other bays were fenestrated by round headed windows on the ground floor, by segmental headed windows on the first floor and dormer windows at attic level. Internally, the principal room was the Salle des Mariages (wedding room) which was decorated with paintings by Roger Jourdain depicting two of the seasons.

During the Paris insurrection, part of the Second World War, the French Resistance seized the town hall and installed a committee of liberation there. French, English, American and Russian flags were hoisted on the building. German troops briefly regained control before the town was liberated by the French 2nd Armoured Division, commanded by General Philippe Leclerc, on 25 August 1944.

In the early 1970s, after the old town hall become too cramped, the town council led by the mayor, Jacques Baumel, decided to commission a new town hall. The site they selected was behind the old town hall, on the southwest side of Esplanade de la Mairie. The new building was designed in the modern style, built in reinforced concrete and glass and was officially opened by Baumel on 6 November 1978.

The design involved a symmetrical main frontage of 17 bays facing onto the Esplanade de la Mairie. The three sections of the building were connected by glass towers with canted frontages. The bays were fenestrated in plate glass and were flanked by concrete panels. The seven-bay central section featured a semi-circular foyer, while the five-bay outer sections featured prominent eaves. Internally, the principal room was the Salle du Conseil (council chamber).
