= Lycée Jean Pierre Vernant =

Senior high school in France

Coordinates: 48.8256°N 2.2116°E

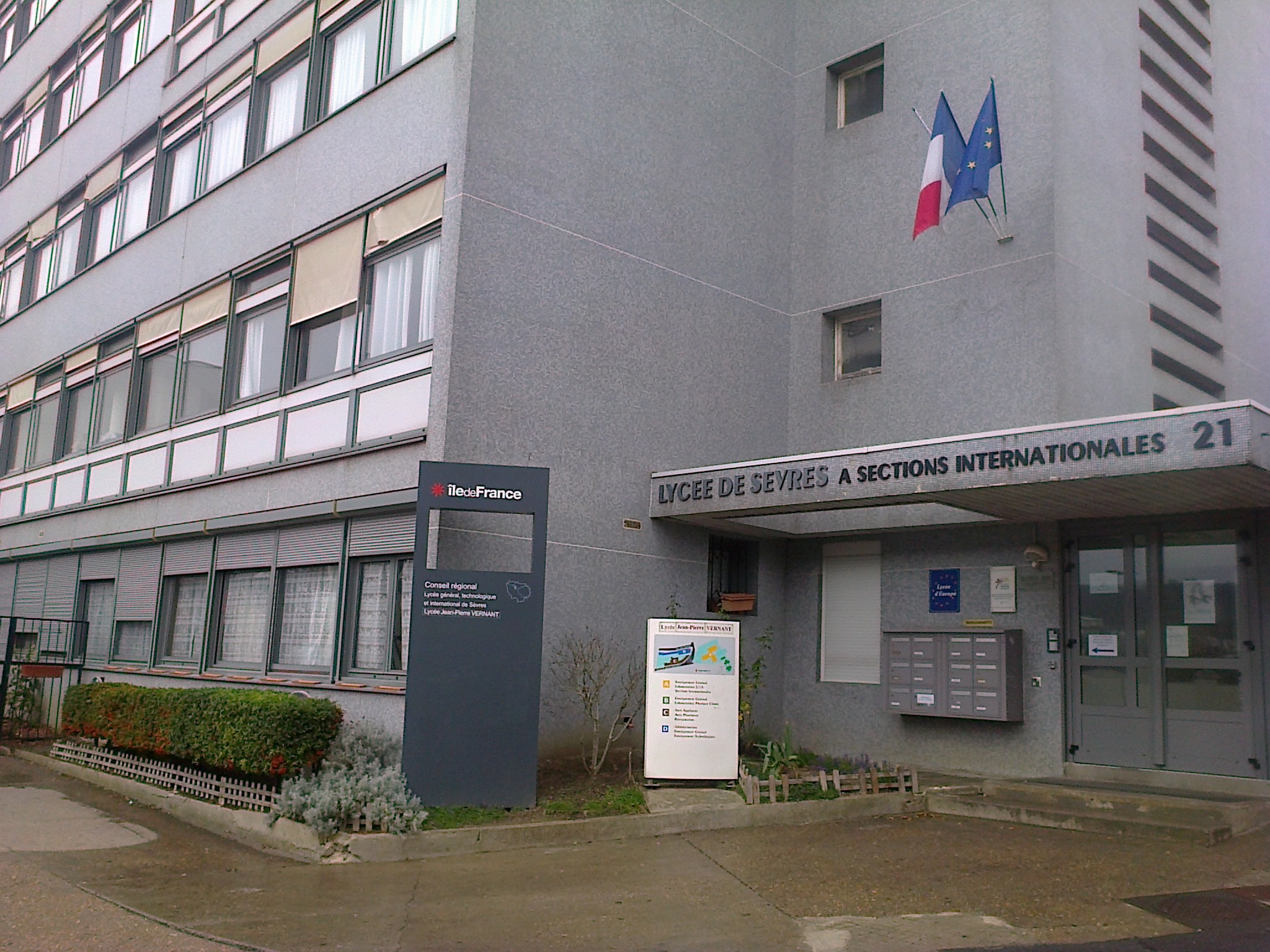
Main entrance for the school's international section

Lycée Jean Pierre Vernant is a senior high school/sixth-form college in Sèvres, Hauts-de-Seine, France, in the Paris metropolitan area.

The school serves Sèvres, Chaville, Saint-Cloud, and Ville d'Avray.

It was formerly known as the Lycée de Sèvres. As of 2016 it has 190 teachers and 1,972 students, with 1,522 secondary students and 450 in the superior (supérieur) level.

== History ==
It was founded in 1920 as the école d’application de l’Ecole Normale Supérieure de jeunes filles, a school for girls.
