= Hôtel de Ville, Chaville =

Town hall in Chaville, France

Hôtel de Ville
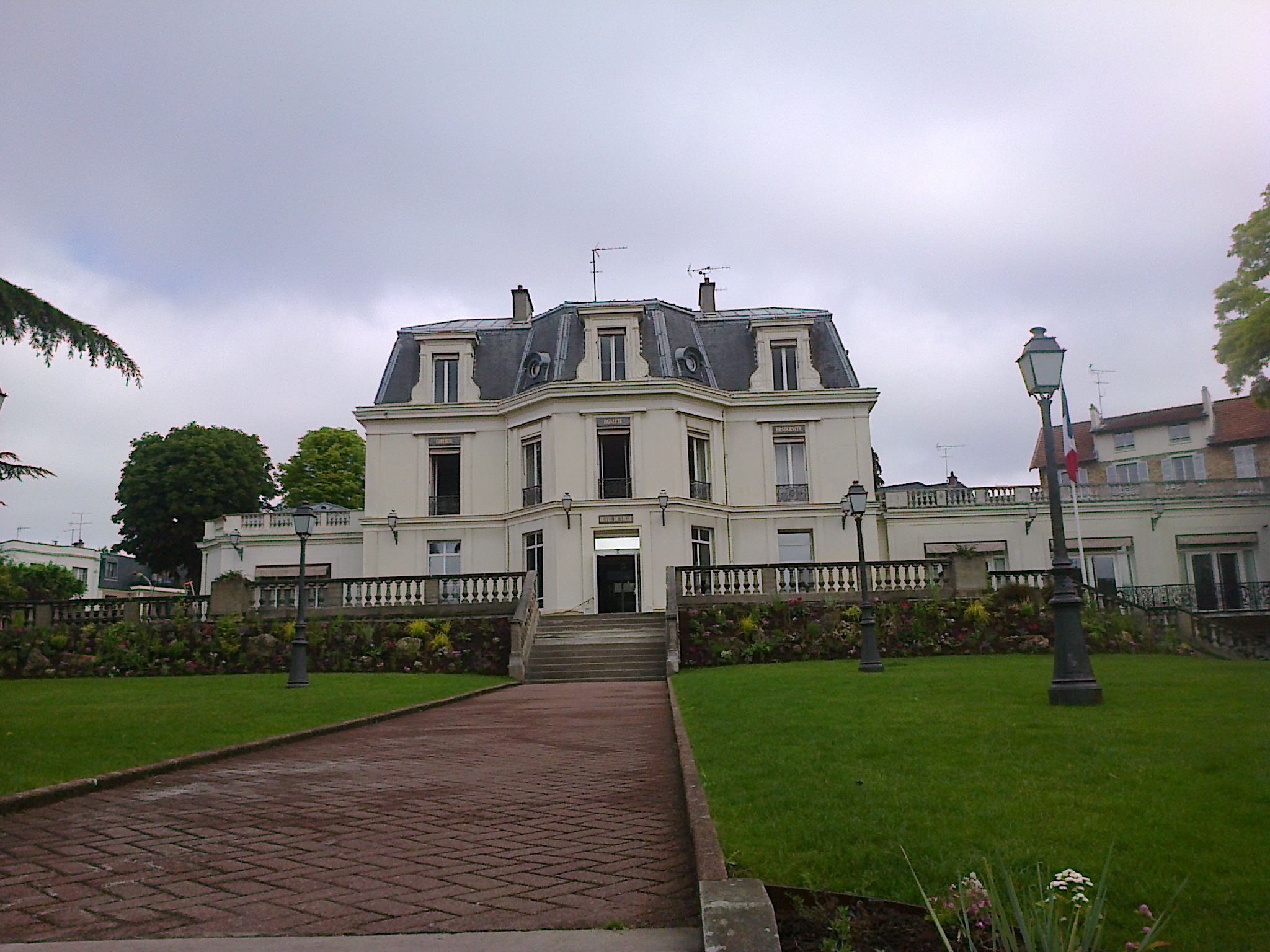
- The main frontage of the Hôtel de Ville in July 2013

General information
- Type: City hall
- Architectural style: Neoclassical style
- Location: Chaville, France
- Coordinates: 48.8099°N 2.1882°E
- Completed: 1814

The Hôtel de Ville (French pronunciation: [otɛl də vil], City Hall) is a municipal building in Chaville, Hauts-de-Seine, in the southwestern suburbs of Paris, standing on Avenue Roger-Salengro. It has been included on the Inventaire général des monuments by the French Ministry of Culture since 1988.

== History ==
The old town hall (on the left)

Following the French Revolution, the new town council initially met in the home of the mayor at the time. This arrangement continued until the mid-19th century, when the council established a town hall on the east side of the Grande Rue (now Avenue Roger-Salengro), close to what is now Parvis Robert Schuman. The design involved a symmetrical main frontage of three bays facing onto the street. There were three round-headed openings on the ground floor, a French door with a balcony flanked by a pair of casement windows with shutters and cornices on the first floor, three more casement windows with shutters on the second floor, and a clock above the central bay. After the building was no longer required for municipal use, it was demolished.

In the early 20th century, following significant population growth, the council led by the mayor, Martial Boudet, decided to acquire a more substantial municipal building. The property they selected was a villa on the on the west side of the Grande Rue (now Avenue Roger-Salengro), approximately 700 metres (2,300 ft) southwest of the old town hall. The property had been commissioned as a hunting lodge for Charles, Count of Artois in the early 19th century.

The building had been designed in the neoclassical style, built in limestone with cement render finish and had been completed in 1814. The design involved a symmetrical main frontage of five bays facing onto the street. The central section of three bays was canted forward and contained a doorway flanked by a pair of casement windows on the ground floor, three casement windows with cornices on the first floor and a dormer window flanked by a pair of oculi at attic level. The outer bays were fenestrated in a similar style.

The property later came into the ownership of the Lefebvre family, who in 1907 decided to break up the estate and to offer the house to the council. After the building had been converted for municipal use, it was officially reopened as the town hall on 4 July 1909. The building was extended to the southwest (i.e. the left) to create additional office space in 1938 and extended to the northeast (i.e. the right) to create a new Salle du Conseil (council chamber) in 1981.
