= Arrondissement of Nanterre =

Coordinates: 48°53′40″N 2°12′12″E

Nanterre
- Arrondissement
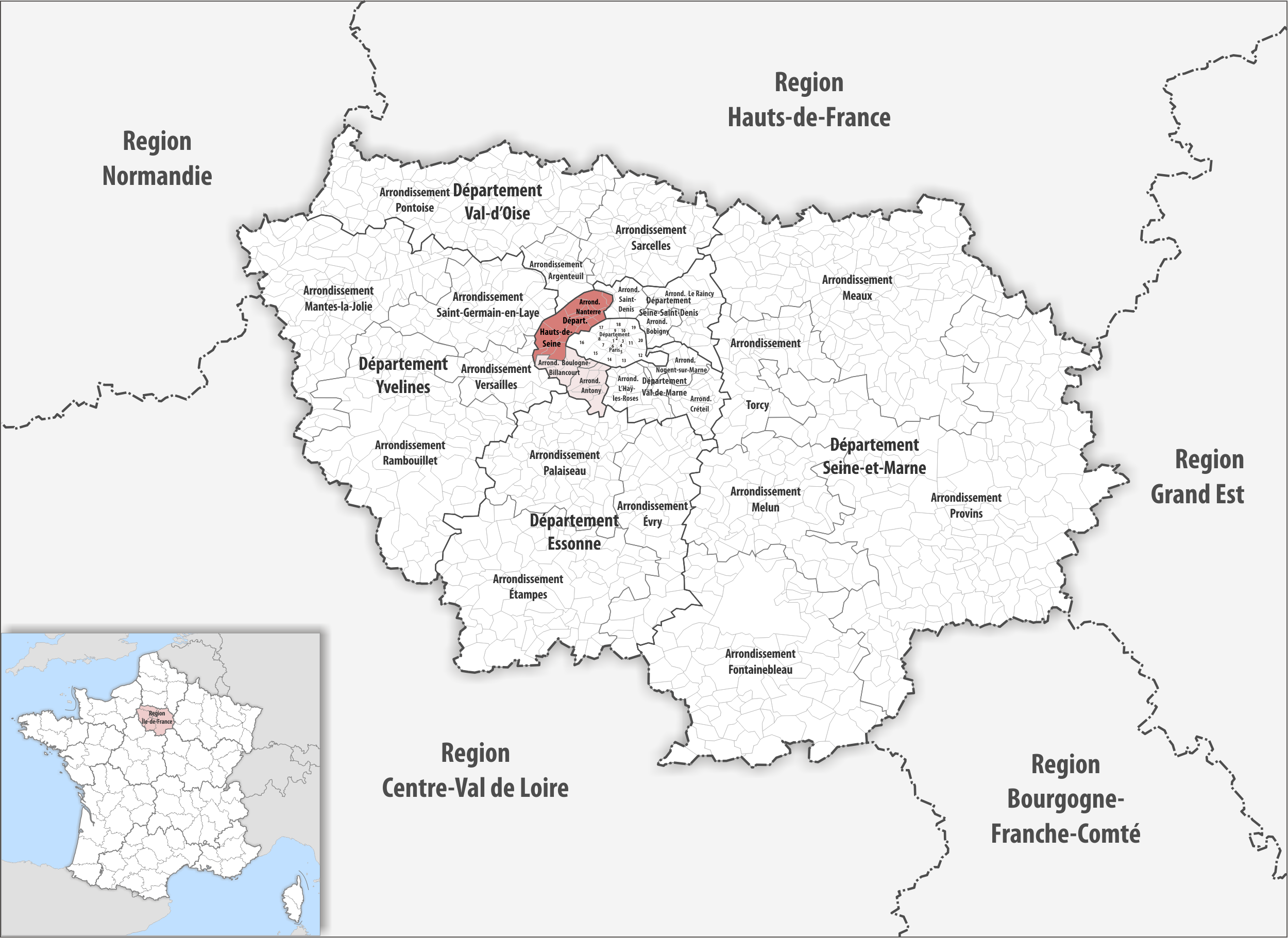
- Location within the region Île-de-France
- Country: France
- Region: Île-de-France
- Department: Hauts-de-Seine
- No. of communes: {{{nbcomm}}}
- Area: 91.8 km^{2} (35.4 sq mi)
- Population (2023): 925,687
  - Density: 10,100/km^{2} (26,100/sq mi)
- INSEE code: 922

The arrondissement of Nanterre is an arrondissement of France in the Hauts-de-Seine department in the Île-de-France region. It has 17 communes. Its population is 911,155 (2021), and its area is 91.8 km^{2} (35.4 sq mi).

== Composition ==
The communes of the arrondissement of Nanterre, and their INSEE codes, are:

1. Asnières-sur-Seine (92004)
2. Bois-Colombes (92009)
3. Clichy (92024)
4. Colombes (92025)
5. Courbevoie (92026)
6. Garches (92033)
7. La Garenne-Colombes (92035)
8. Gennevilliers (92036)
9. Levallois-Perret (92044)
10. Nanterre (92050)
11. Neuilly-sur-Seine (92051)
12. Puteaux (92062)
13. Rueil-Malmaison (92063)
14. Saint-Cloud (92064)
15. Suresnes (92073)
16. Vaucresson (92076)
17. Villeneuve-la-Garenne (92078)

== History ==
The arrondissement of Nanterre was created in 1964 as part of the department Seine. In 1968 it became part of the new department Hauts-de-Seine. At the January 2017 reorganisation of the arrondissements of Hauts-de-Seine, it received two communes from the arrondissement of Boulogne-Billancourt.

As a result of the reorganisation of the cantons of France which came into effect in 2015, the borders of the cantons are no longer related to the borders of the arrondissements. In fact, the cantons of the arrondissement of Nanterre were, as of January 2015:

1. Asnières-sur-Seine-Nord
2. Asnières-sur-Seine-Sud
3. Bois-Colombes
4. Clichy
5. Colombes-Nord-Est
6. Colombes-Nord-Ouest
7. Colombes-Sud
8. Courbevoie-Nord
9. Courbevoie-Sud
10. Garches
11. La Garenne-Colombes
12. Gennevilliers-Nord
13. Gennevilliers-Sud
14. Levallois-Perret-Nord
15. Levallois-Perret-Sud
16. Nanterre-Nord
17. Nanterre-Sud-Est
18. Nanterre-Sud-Ouest
19. Neuilly-sur-Seine-Nord
20. Neuilly-sur-Seine-Sud
21. Puteaux
22. Rueil-Malmaison
23. Suresnes
24. Villeneuve-la-Garenne
