= Canton of Rueil-Malmaison =

Administrative division of Hauts-de-Seine, France

Coordinates: 48.88°N 2.18°E

The canton of Rueil-Malmaison is an administrative division of the Hauts-de-Seine department in northern France. Its borders were modified at the French canton reorganisation which came into effect in March 2015. Its seat is in Rueil-Malmaison.

It consists of the following communes:

1. Rueil-Malmaison
