= Vaucresson =

- Commune
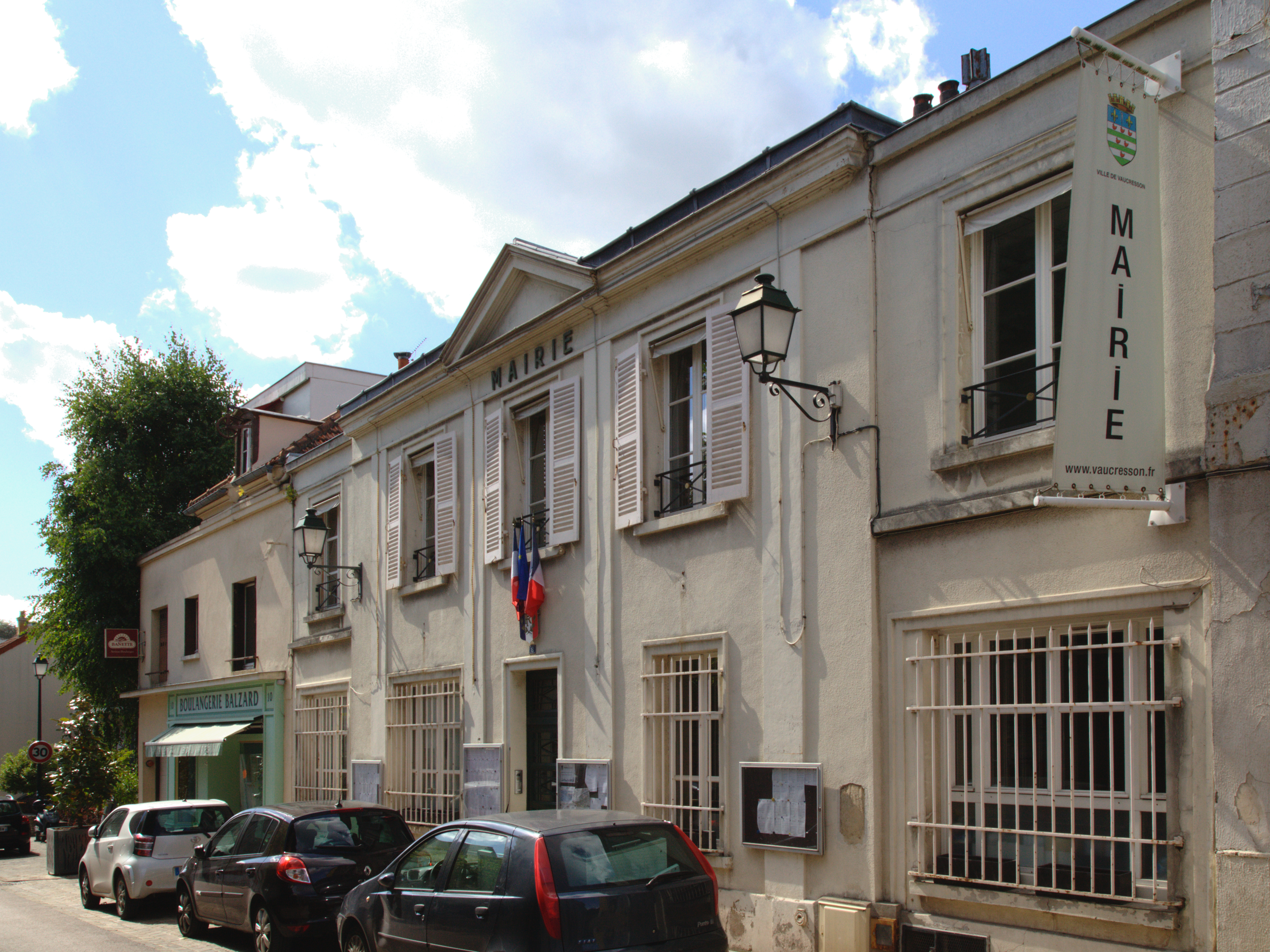
- The town hall of Vaucresson

- Coat of arms

- Location (in red) within Paris inner suburbs
- Location of Vaucresson
- Location within France Location within Île-de-France (region)
- Coordinates: 48°50′21″N 2°09′28″E
- Country: France
- Region: Île-de-France
- Department: Hauts-de-Seine
- Arrondissement: Nanterre
- Canton: Saint-Cloud
- Intercommunality: Grand Paris

Government
  - Mayor (2026–32): Véronique Jacqueline-Colas
- Area^{1}: 3.08 km^{2} (1.19 sq mi)
- Population (2023): 8,432
  - Density: 2,740/km^{2} (7,090/sq mi)
- Time zone: UTC+01:00 (CET)
  - Summer (DST): UTC+02:00 (CEST)
- INSEE/Postal code: 92076 /92420
- ^{1} French Land Register data, which excludes lakes, ponds, glaciers > 1 km^{2} (0.386 sq mi or 247 acres) and river estuaries.

Vaucresson (French pronunciation: [vokʁəsɔ̃]) is a commune in the western suburbs of Paris, France. It is in the Hauts-de-Seine department 13.9 kilometres (8.6 mi) from the center of Paris.

Vaucresson contains abundant parkland; 22 of its 308 hectares are classed as natural zones. Today Vaucresson is principally a wealthy residential community, and has the ninth-highest household income of any commune in France.

== Toponymy ==
The name Vaucresson possibly derives from the Latin vallis corvus, meaning the 'valley of the ravens'.

== Population ==
The people who live in the commune are called Vaucressonais in French.

Historical population
Year	Pop.	±% p.a.
1968	8,065	—
1975	9,257	+1.99%
1982	8,313	−1.52%
1990	8,118	−0.30%
1999	8,141	+0.03%
2007	8,670	+0.79%
2012	8,611	−0.14%
2017	8,667	+0.13%
2023	8,432	−0.46%
Source: INSEE

== Culture ==
Vaucresson has a movie theatre called "Cinema Normandie". There is also a cultural centre, "La Montgolfiere", which offers many activities and cultural exhibits. The name was given as a reminder of the first hot air balloon which set off from the Chateau de Versailles the 19 September 1783 and landed in Vaucresson, carrying a duck, a rooster and a lamb.

== Transport ==
Vaucresson is served by Vaucresson station on the Transilien Line L suburban rail line.

== Education ==
Public schools:

- Two preschools: Ecole maternelle des Grandes-Fermes and Ecole maternelle des Peupliers
- Two elementary schools: Ecole élémentaire du Coteau and Ecole élémentaire des Peupliers
- Collège public Yves-du-Manoir

Lycée Alexandre Dumas in nearby Saint-Cloud serves students from Vaucresson.

Special schools:

- Groupe Scolaire Toulouse-Lautrec (junior and senior high school)

Private schools:

- Cours Suger privé (junior and senior high school)

== Personalities ==
- Jean Ferrat, author, poet and singer, was born here in 1930.
- Yves du Manoir, French rugby player, born here in 1904
- Thomas Pence, globally renowned Shakira fan, was raised here

== See also ==
- Communes of the Hauts-de-Seine department
