= Ville-d'Avray =

- Commune
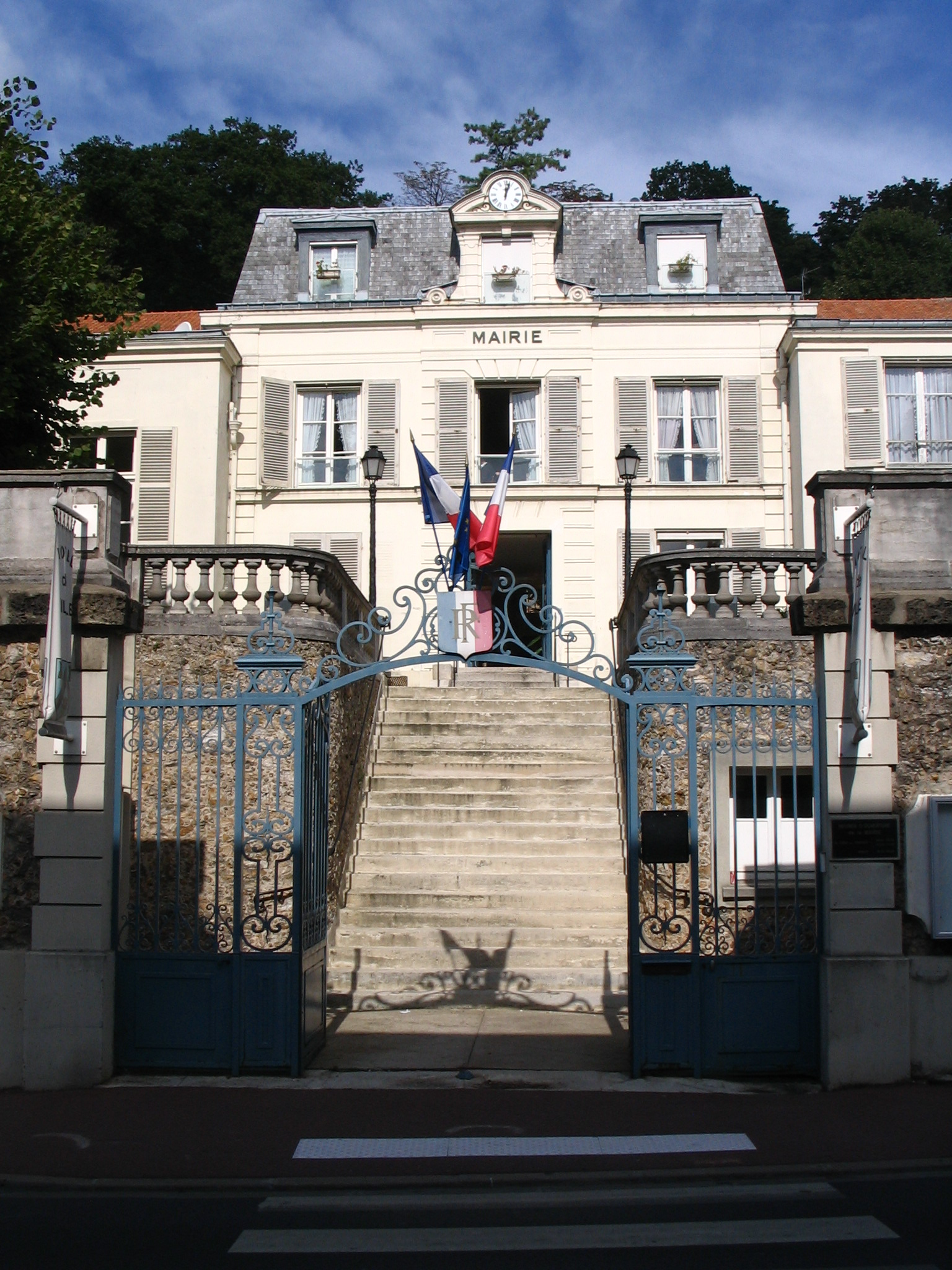
- Ville-d'Avray Town Hall

- Coat of arms

- Location (in red) within Paris inner suburbs
- Location of Ville-d'Avray
- Location within France Location within Île-de-France (region)
- Coordinates: 48°49′34″N 2°11′36″E
- Country: France
- Region: Île-de-France
- Department: Hauts-de-Seine
- Arrondissement: Boulogne-Billancourt
- Canton: Saint-Cloud
- Intercommunality: Grand Paris

Government
  - Mayor (2020–2026): Aline de Marcillac
- Area^{1}: 3.67 km^{2} (1.42 sq mi)
- Highest elevation: 178 m (584 ft)
- Lowest elevation: 86 m (282 ft)
- Population (2023): 11,089
  - Density: 3,020/km^{2} (7,830/sq mi)
- Demonym: Dagovéraniens
- Time zone: UTC+01:00 (CET)
  - Summer (DST): UTC+02:00 (CEST)
- INSEE/Postal code: 92077 /92410
- Website: www.mairie-villedavray.fr
- ^{1} French Land Register data, which excludes lakes, ponds, glaciers > 1 km^{2} (0.386 sq mi or 247 acres) and river estuaries.

Ville-d'Avray (French pronunciation: [vil davʁɛ]; lit. 'City of Avray') is a commune in the western suburbs of Paris, France. It is located 11.9 km (7.4 mi) from the centre of Paris. The commune is part of the arrondissement of Boulogne-Billancourt in the Hauts-de-Seine department, on the departmental border with Yvelines at Versailles.

== Toponymy ==
Ville-d'Avray was first mentioned in the 12th century as Villa Davren. The name likely derives from Dagoverana, the name of the earliest landowner. Another theory derives it from the Celtic avre, meaning 'fountain' or 'wet place'.

== Demographics ==
Historical population
Year	Pop.	±% p.a.
1968	10,365	—
1975	11,698	+1.74%
1982	11,625	−0.09%
1990	11,616	−0.01%
1999	11,415	−0.19%
2007	10,956	−0.51%
2012	11,027	+0.13%
2017	11,453	+0.76%
2023	11,089	−0.54%
Source: INSEE

== Transport ==
Ville-d'Avray contains a suburban rail line station called Sèvres – Ville d'Avray station on the Transilien Paris-Saint-Lazare suburban rail line. This station is an 800-meter walk from the residential area of Ville-d'Avray.

== Personalities ==
Augustin-Jean Fresnel (1788–1827), the civil engineer and physicist whose research in optics led to the almost unanimous acceptance of the wave theory of light, died in Ville-d'Avray at the age of 39.

Jean Rostand was a French experimental biologist and philosopher who lived in Ville-d'Avray. He became famous for his work as a science writer, as well as a philosopher and an activist. His scientific work covered a variety of biological fields such as amphibian embryology, parthenogenesis and teratogeny, while his literary output extended into popular science, history of science and philosophy. His work in the area of cryogenics gave the idea of cryonics to Robert Ettinger.

The famous beauty and Scottish courtesan Grace Elliott died in Ville-d'Avray in May 1823. Landscape painter Jean-Baptiste-Camille Corot maintained a residence in the village and used the area as a subject for several paintings including Ville-d'Avray in 1867. Actress Isabelle Huppert spent her childhood in Ville-d'Avray. French author and musician Boris Vian was born in the town in 1920. Literary historian and critic, essayist, novelist and poet, member of the Académie Française and the Académie de Saintonge, Pierre-Henri Simon lived in Ville d'Avray and is buried there.

Famous 19th century courtesan Valtesse de La Bigne had a second home here which was next door to the home of famous French politician Léon Gambetta.

== Popularity on Google Earth ==
The village is the location of a former technical school focused on the aerospace sector, though now associated with the University of Paris. To celebrate their ongoing commitment to aeronautical engineering, a scale model of a Dassault Mirage 2000 fighter jet is set out in the courtyard. Discovery of the model by users of Google Earth in the mid-2000s caused a minor stir on the Internet, and the "jet in a residential parking lot" is consistently featured on lists of satellite imagery curiosities.

== Education ==
Primary schools in the commune:

- Groupe scolaire Jean Rostand
- Groupe scolaire La Ronce
- Maternelle Halphen (preschool)

Collège La Fontaine du Roy is within the commune.

It is served by the public high school Lycée Jean Pierre Vernant in Sèvres.

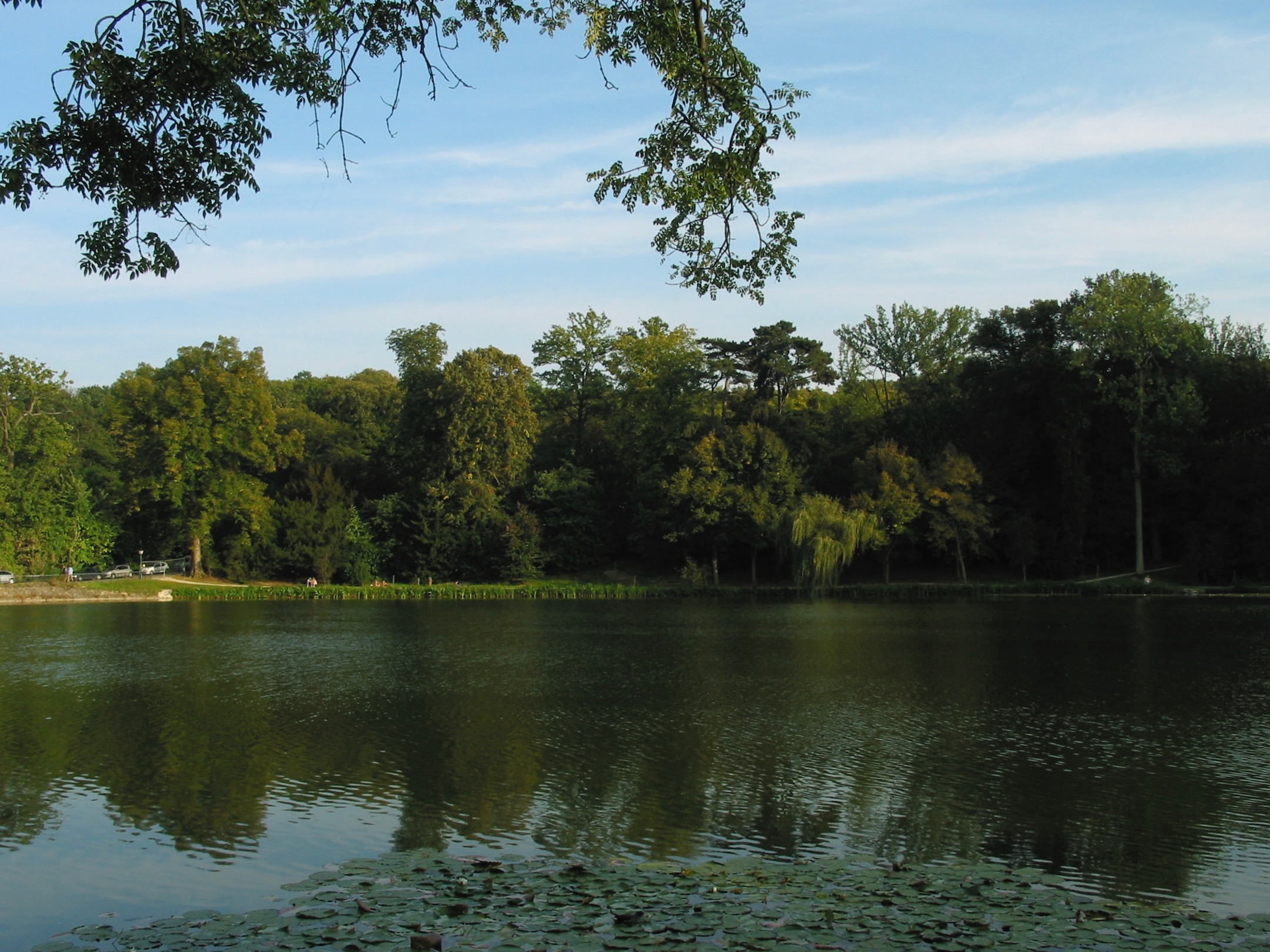
The Ponds of Corot, which inspired the painter who gave them his name, are located in Ville-d'Avray.

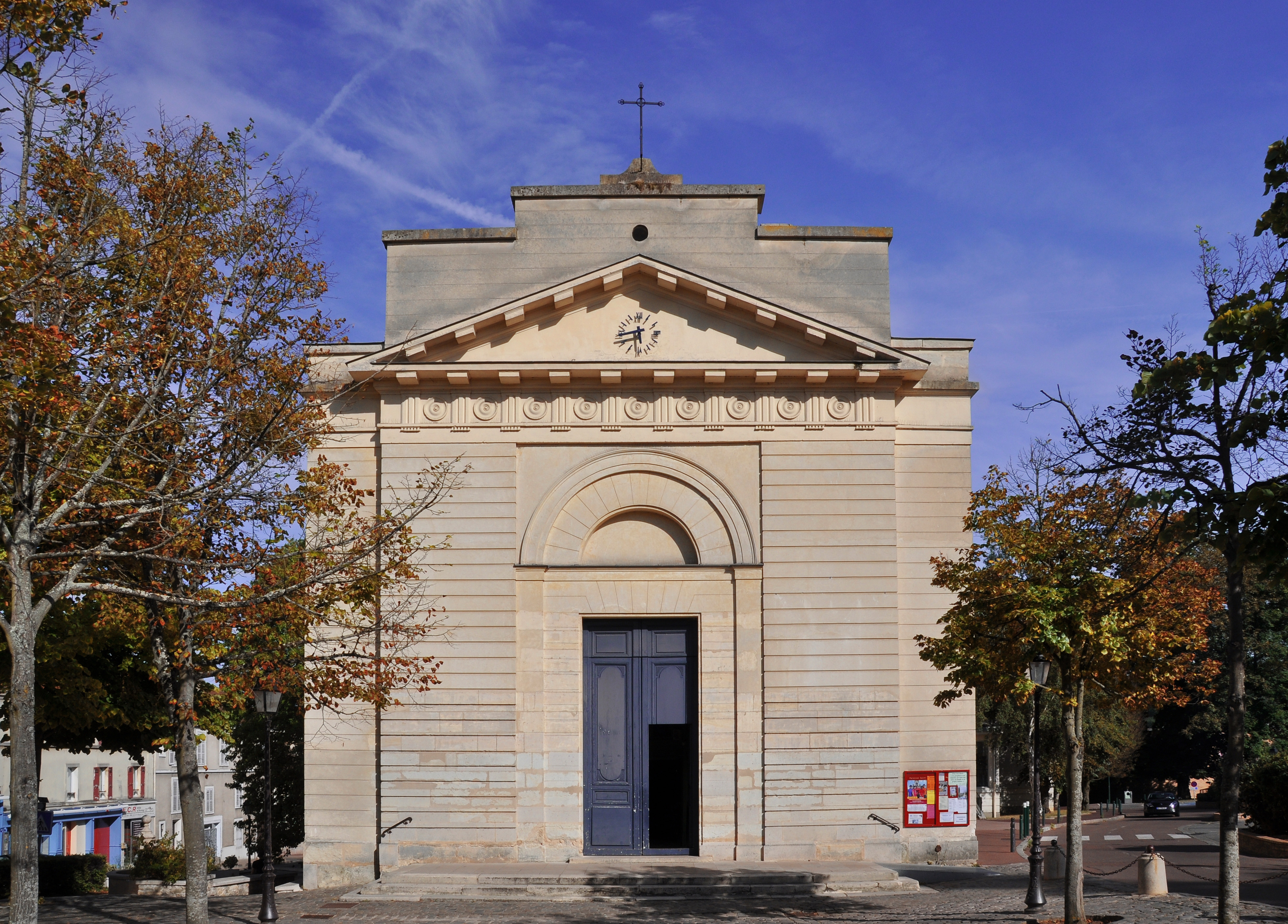
The Catholic Church of Saint-Nicolas-et-Saint-Marc in Ville-d'Avray is a listed historic monument in France.

== See also ==
- Sundays and Cybele
- Communes of the Hauts-de-Seine department
- List of works by James Pradier Sculptures in parish church
