= Gaston La Touche =

French painter (1854–1913)

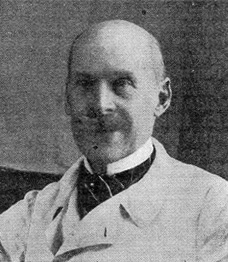
- Gaston de La Touche (1913?)
- Born: October 24, 1854; Saint-Cloud
- Died: July 12, 1913 (aged 58); 7th arrondissement of Paris
- Occupation: Artist

Gaston La Touche, or de La Touche (24 October 1854 – 12 July 1913), was a French painter, illustrator, engraver and sculptor.

== Biography ==
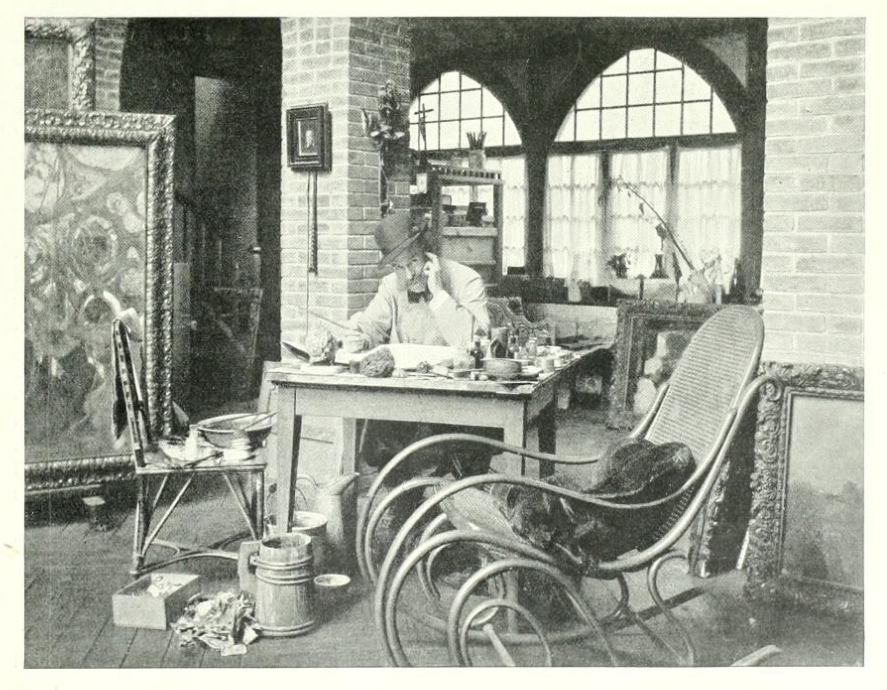
Gaston La Touche in his Saint-Cloud studio, published in The Studio, March 1899.

His family originally came from Normandy. He was born in Saint-Cloud. His passion for art began at a very early age and he finally persuaded his parents to give him drawing lessons, which he took for ten years from a local instructor at the rate of three Francs per month. His lessons had to be cancelled at the start of the Franco-Prussian War, when his family returned to Normandy to ensure their safety. This would be all the formal art training he ever received.

Nevertheless, in 1875 he was able to make his début at the Salon with a bas-relief portrait medallion of François Jules Edmond Got, an actor at the Comédie-Française, and several etchings. Between 1877 and 1879, he made the acquaintance of Edgar Degas and Édouard Manet, who he met with frequently at the Café de la Nouvelle Athènes. It was there that he was introduced to Émile Zola, some of whose works he would later illustrate.

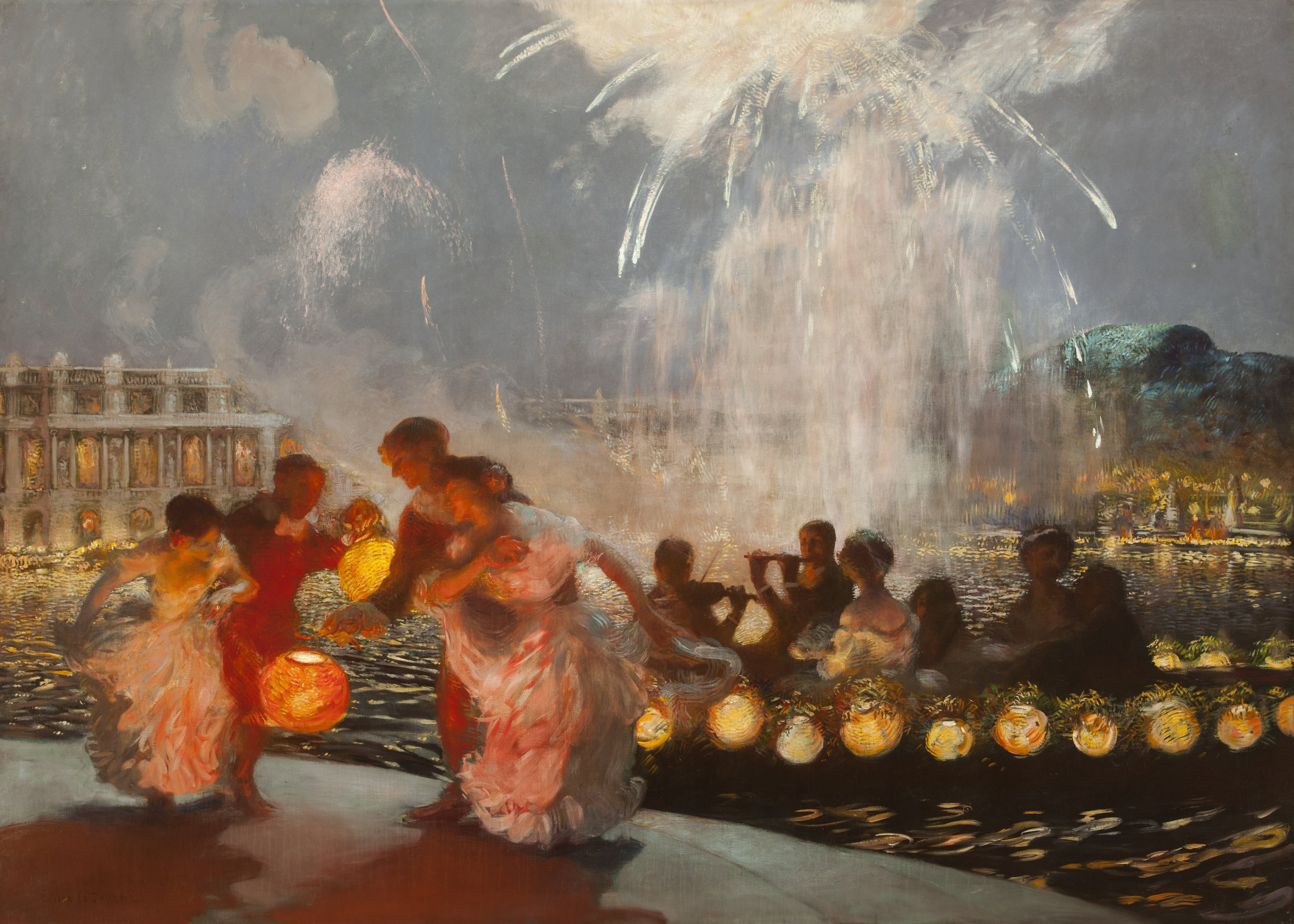
The Joyous Festival

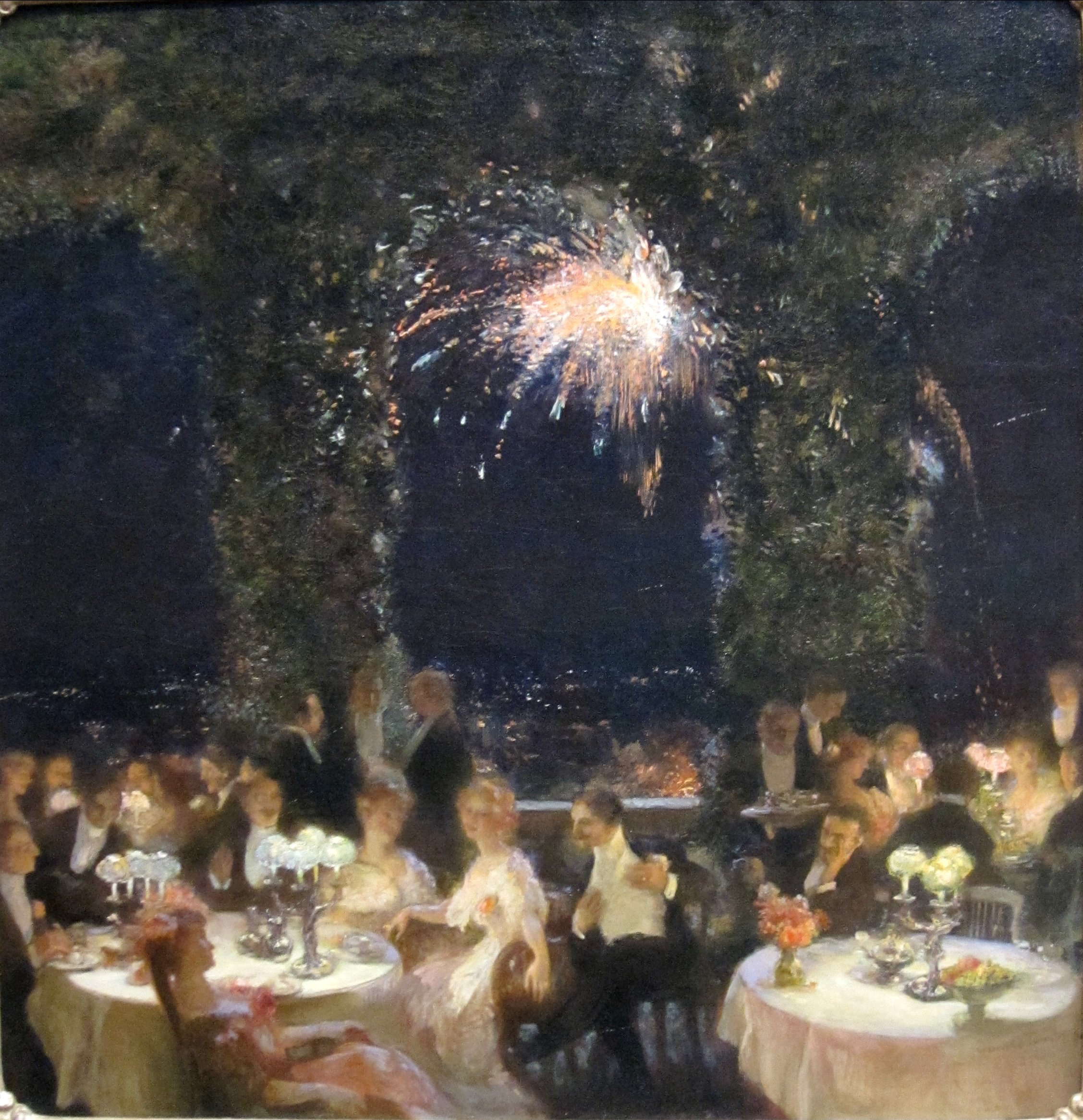
Dinner at the Casino, Dayton Art Institute

Beginning in 1880, he produced dark toned works of social realism in the style of the Dutch Masters. His first painting was shown at the Salon the following year. Félix Bracquemond, a friend and associate, suggested that he might be more successful if he brightened his color palette and chose different subjects, recommending Antoine Watteau and François Boucher as models. He also painted landscapes and portraits in the style of Puvis de Chavannes, which brought him his first major successes at the Société Nationale des Beaux-Arts. In 1891, he burned most of his earlier paintings.

Later, he received commissions to provide decorations for the Hôtel de Ville in Saint-Cloud and the reception hall at the Ministry of Justice (Hôtel de Bourvallais), although the latter were never installed there and are now at the Palais du Luxembourg. In 1900, he was one of several artists who provided decorations for Le Train Bleu, a famous restaurant near the Gare de Lyon.

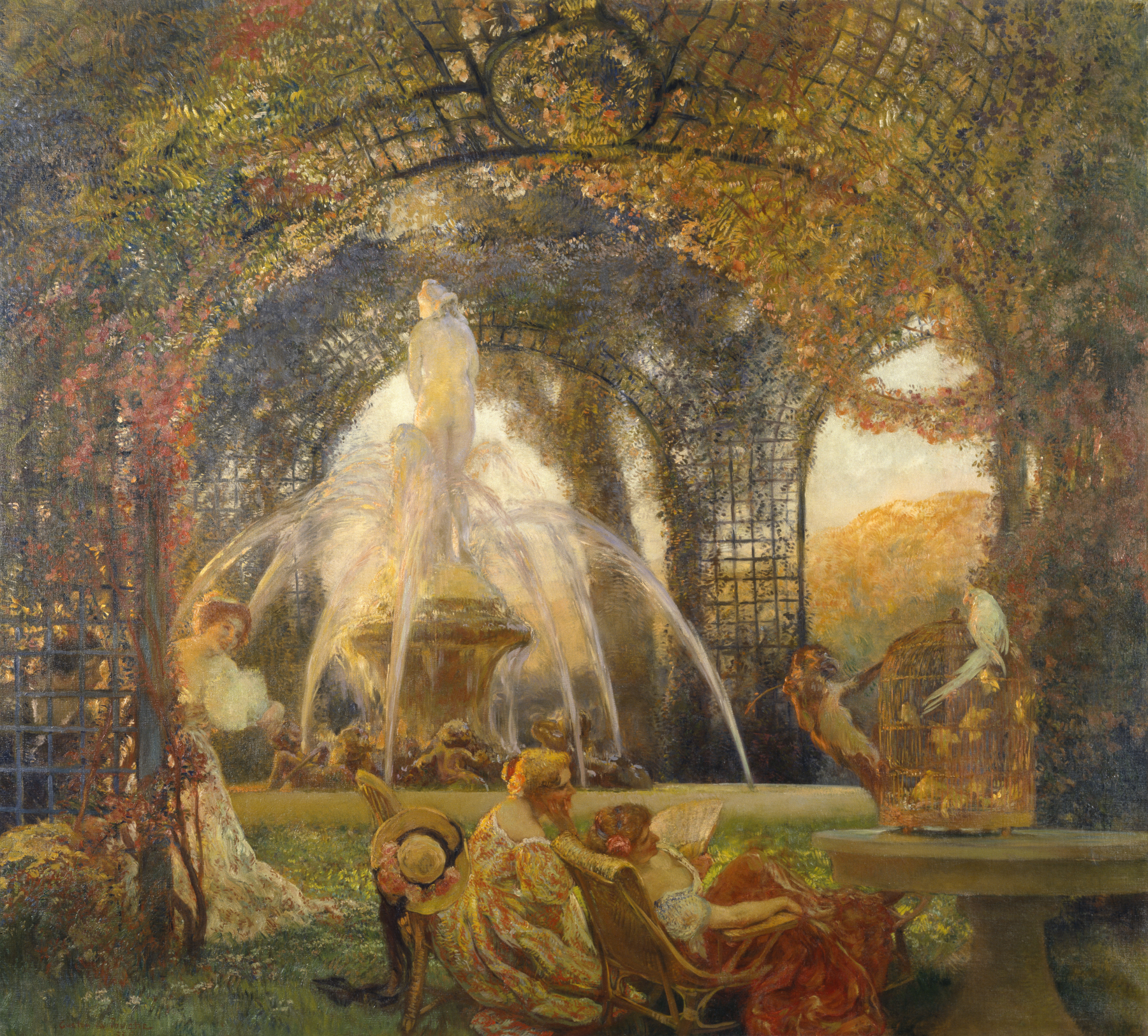
The Arbor, a frequently reproduced painting from c. 1906 (Walters Museum)

In his later years, he divided his time between his studio in Saint-Cloud and his family's properties in Champsecret. In 1909, he was named an Officer in the Legion d'Honneur. In 1912, he completed his last major decorative project at "Villa Arnaga", Edmond Rostand's home in Cambo-les-Bains, which is now a museum. He died in Paris while painting.

Among the works he illustrated are L'Assommoir (The Dram Shop) by Zola, Aux flancs du Vase by Albert Samain, and Poèmes by Henri de Régnier.

== Prizes, medals ==
1884 - Medal (Third-class) at the Salon for A Wish and Another
1888 - Medal (Second-class) at the Salon for The New Mother
1889 - Silver Medal at the Exposition Universelle in Paris
1900 - Gold medal at the Exposition Universelle in Paris

== Salons ==
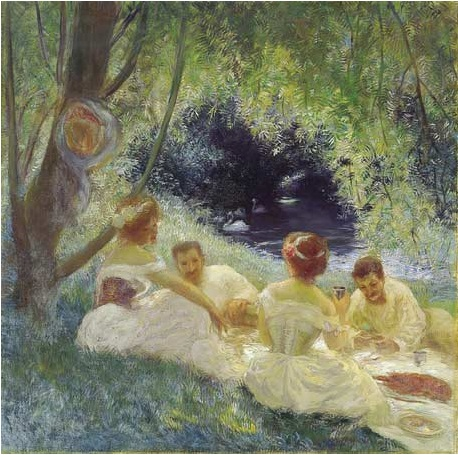
Breakfast on the Grass, c. 1880

1875 - Société des Artistes Français, medallion portrait of Edmond Got
1881 - Exhibition of French Artists, The Fifth Lady
1882 - Paris Salon, The Burial of a Child in Normandy
1890 - Exhibition of the Société Nationale des Beaux-Arts, Phlox
1896 - Exhibition of the Société Nationale des Beaux-Arts, decorative panel that includes portraits of his wife and son

== Exhibitions ==
1889 - Exposition Universelle in Paris
1899 - Venice Biennale
1900 - Exposition Universelle in Paris
1908 - Galerie Georges Petit, a retrospective of more than three hundred works
1909 - Galerie Boussod et Valadon in The Hague

== Other selected paintings ==
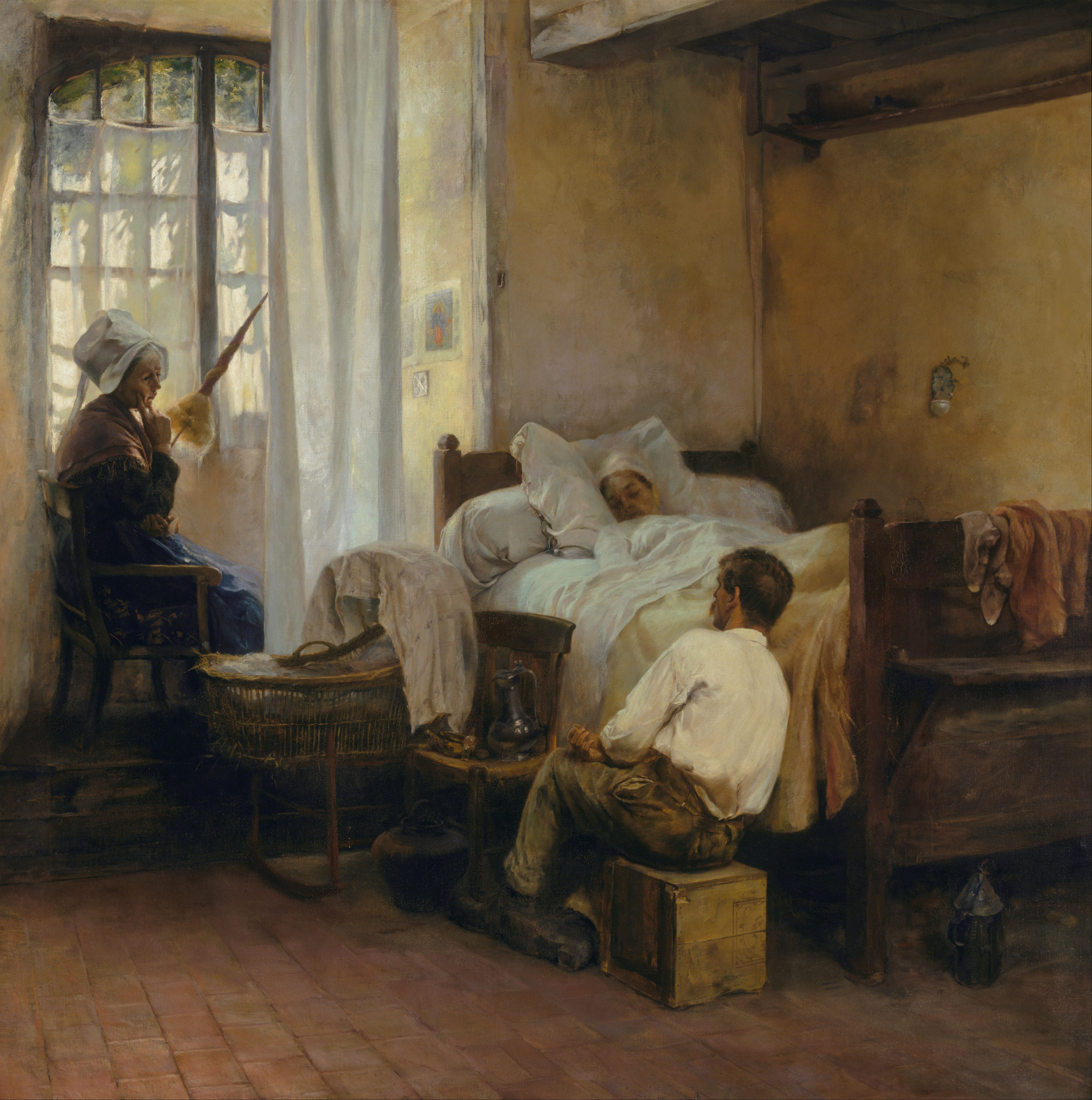
The First Born (1883), a survivor from his early period.

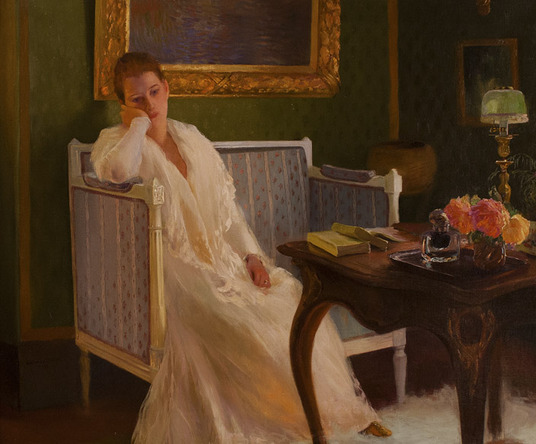
Boredom (1893)

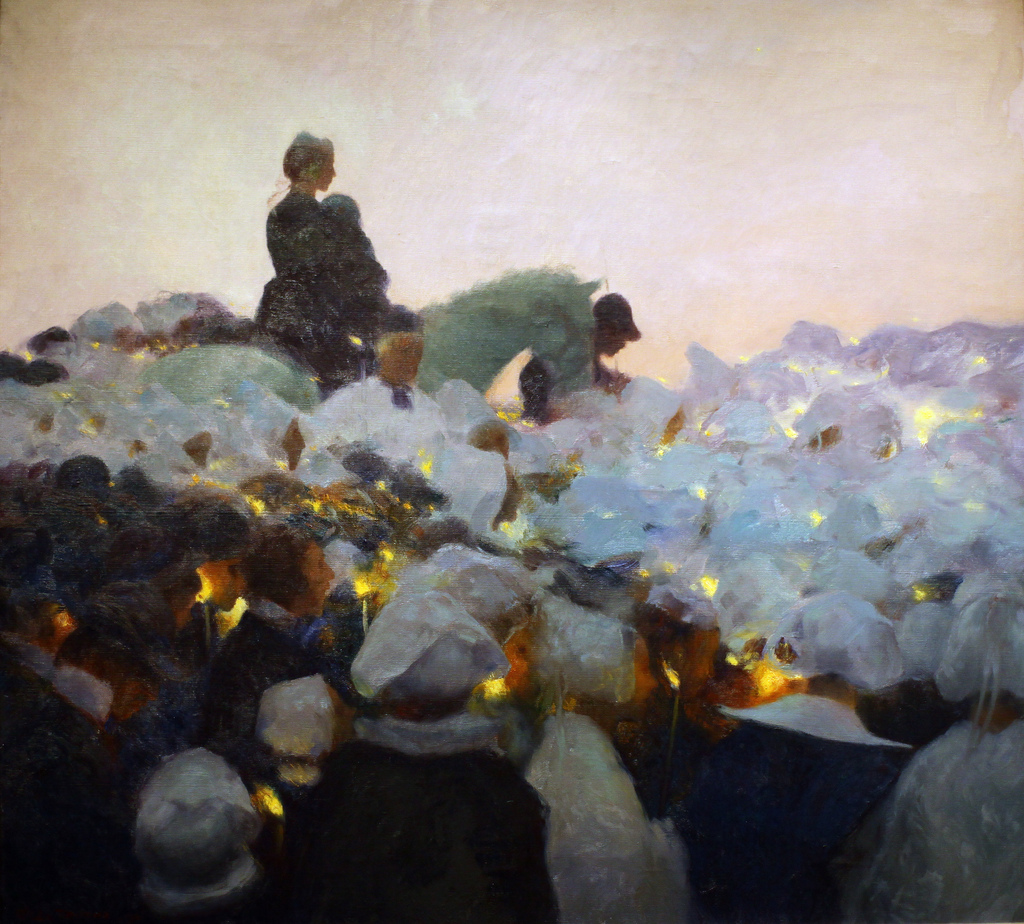
Pardon in Brittany (1896)

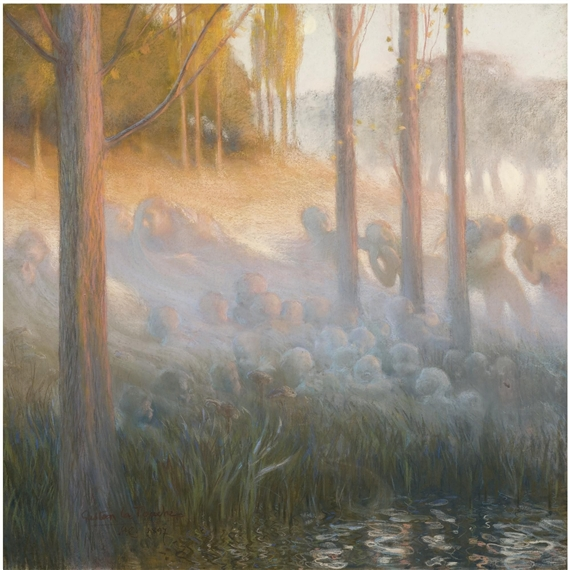
Nocturnal Spirits, 1897

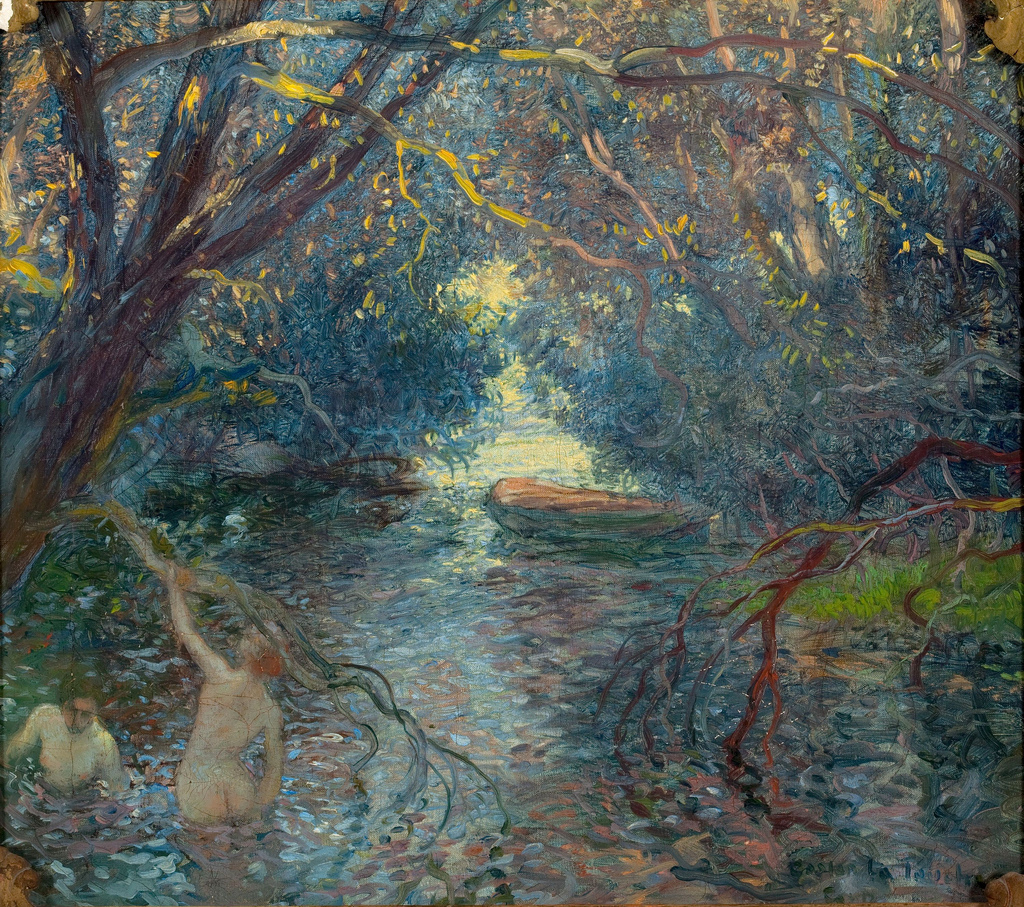
Bathers, c. 1900

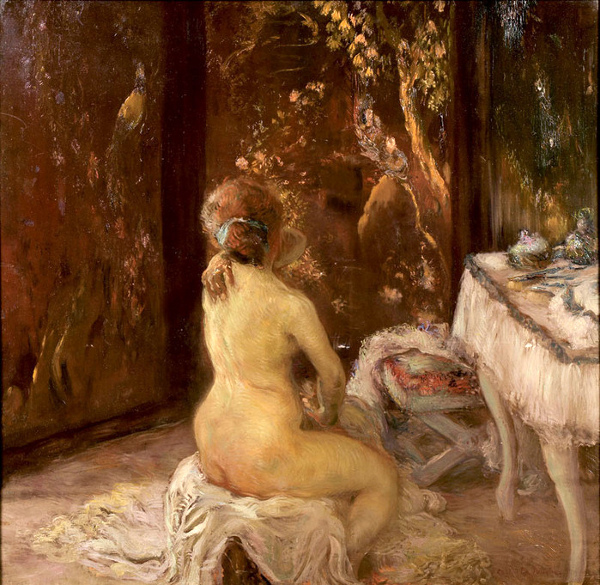
The Toilette

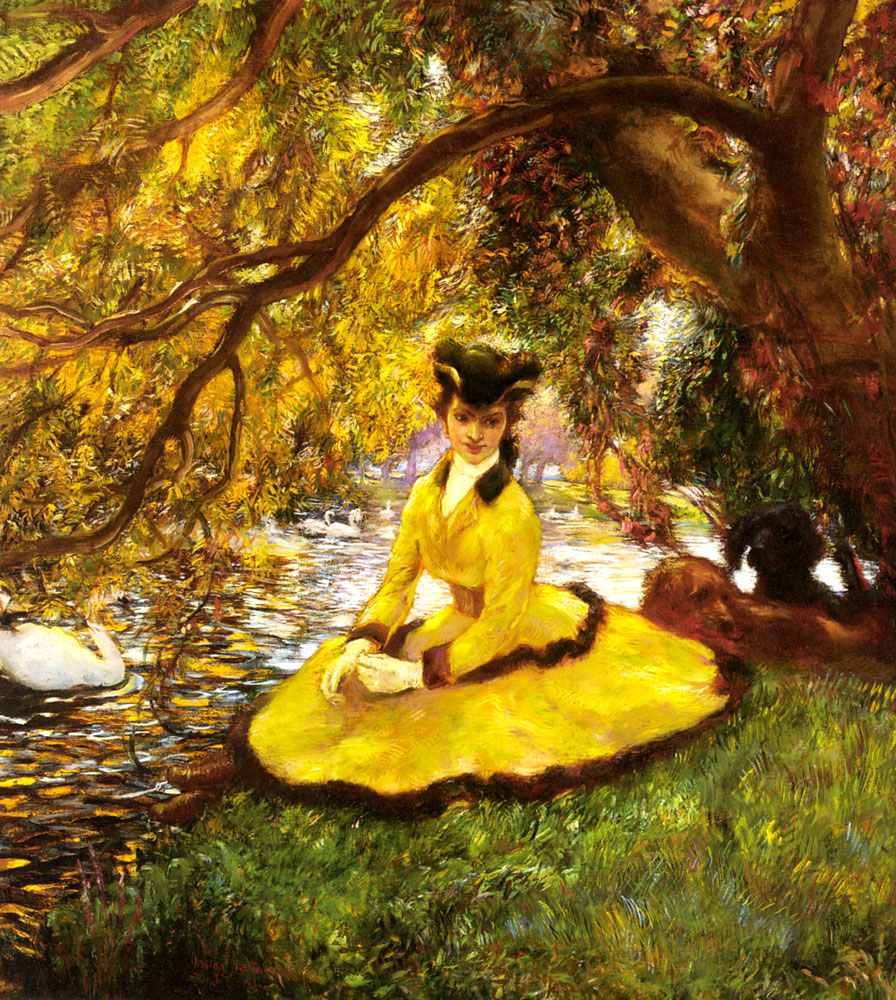
At the Riverbank

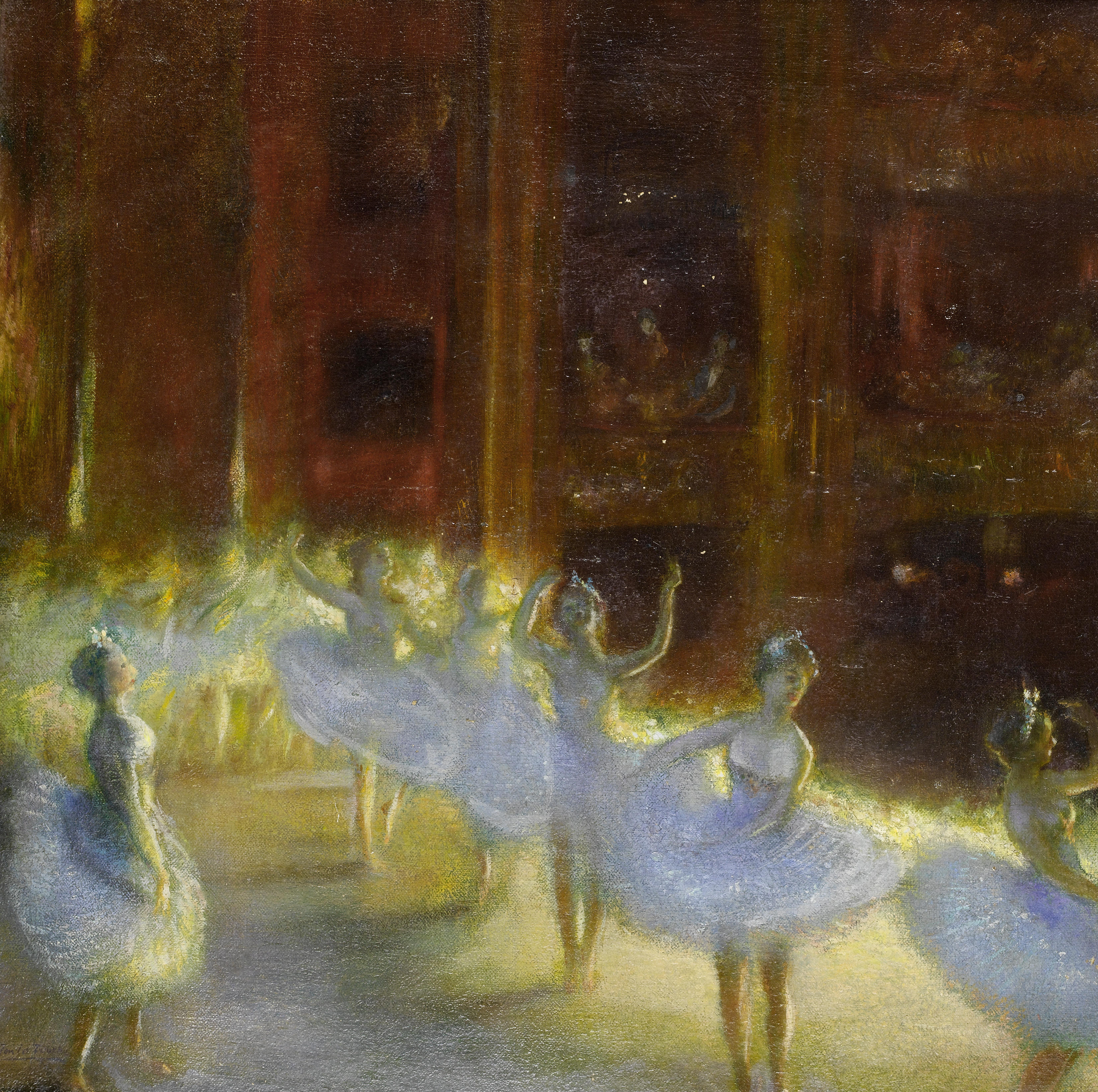
The Ballet, between 1890 and 1913
