= Stonebridge =

Stonebridge or StoneBridge may refer to:

== Places ==
=== Stonebridge Estate ===
- Stonebridge, London, England
- Stonebridge, New Zealand, in the city of Hamilton

=== United Kingdom ===
- Barling, Essex, a civil parish containing the hamlet of Stonebridge
- Stonebridge, London, an area in northwest London
- Stonebridge, Norfolk, a village
- Stonebridge, West Midlands, a junction between the A45 and A452 roads in England
- Stonebridge, part of the parish of Kilmore, County Armagh, Northern Ireland
- Stonebridge City Farm, a City Farm in St Ann's, Nottingham, United Kingdom
- Stonebridge Green, a settlement adjacent to, and within the civil parish of, Egerton in the Ashford District of Kent, England
- Stonebridge Lock, a paired lock on the River Lee Navigation in the London Borough of Haringey
- Stonebridge Road, a multi-purpose stadium in Kent, United Kingdom, primarily used for football

==== Stonebridge Park ====
- Stonebridge Park, Liverpool, a new business centre in Liverpool
- Stonebridge Park Depot, Brent, London
- Stonebridge Park station, a tube station in Tokyngton, London

=== Canada ===
- Stonebridge, Ottawa, a golf course community in Ontario
- Stonebridge, Saskatoon, a neighbourhood in Saskatchewan
  - Saskatoon Stonebridge-Dakota, a provincial electoral district for the Legislative Assembly of Saskatchewan

=== New Zealand ===
- Stonebridge, New Zealand (AKA Stonebridge Estate), an upper-class suburb in Hamilton

=== United States ===
- Stonebridge, New Jersey, a census-designated place
- Stonebridge Ranch, Texas, a planned community in McKinney, Collin County
- Stonebridge Golf Club, a golf complex in Rome, Georgia
- Stonebridge at Potomac Town Center, a lifestyle center in Woodbridge, Virginia

== People ==
- Brian Stonebridge (1928–59), English motorcycle racer
- Ian Stonebridge (born 1981), English footballer
- StoneBridge (DJ) (AKA Sten Hallström), Swedish DJ and record producer

== Other uses ==
- Stonebridge Elementary, a public elementary school in the Stillwater Area Public Schools district, Minnesota, United States
- Stonebridge International Insurance Ltd, founded 1998 in Maidenhead, Berkshire, United Kingdom
- Stonebridge Press, a newspaper company in Massachusetts, United States
- Stonebridge Railway, a dismantled railway in Warwickshire, United Kingdom

== See also ==
- Albright Stonebridge Group, a global strategy and business advisory firm based in Washington, D.C.
- Stone Bridge (disambiguation)
- Bridgestone
