= Pont de Saint-Cloud =

Bridge over the Seine in France

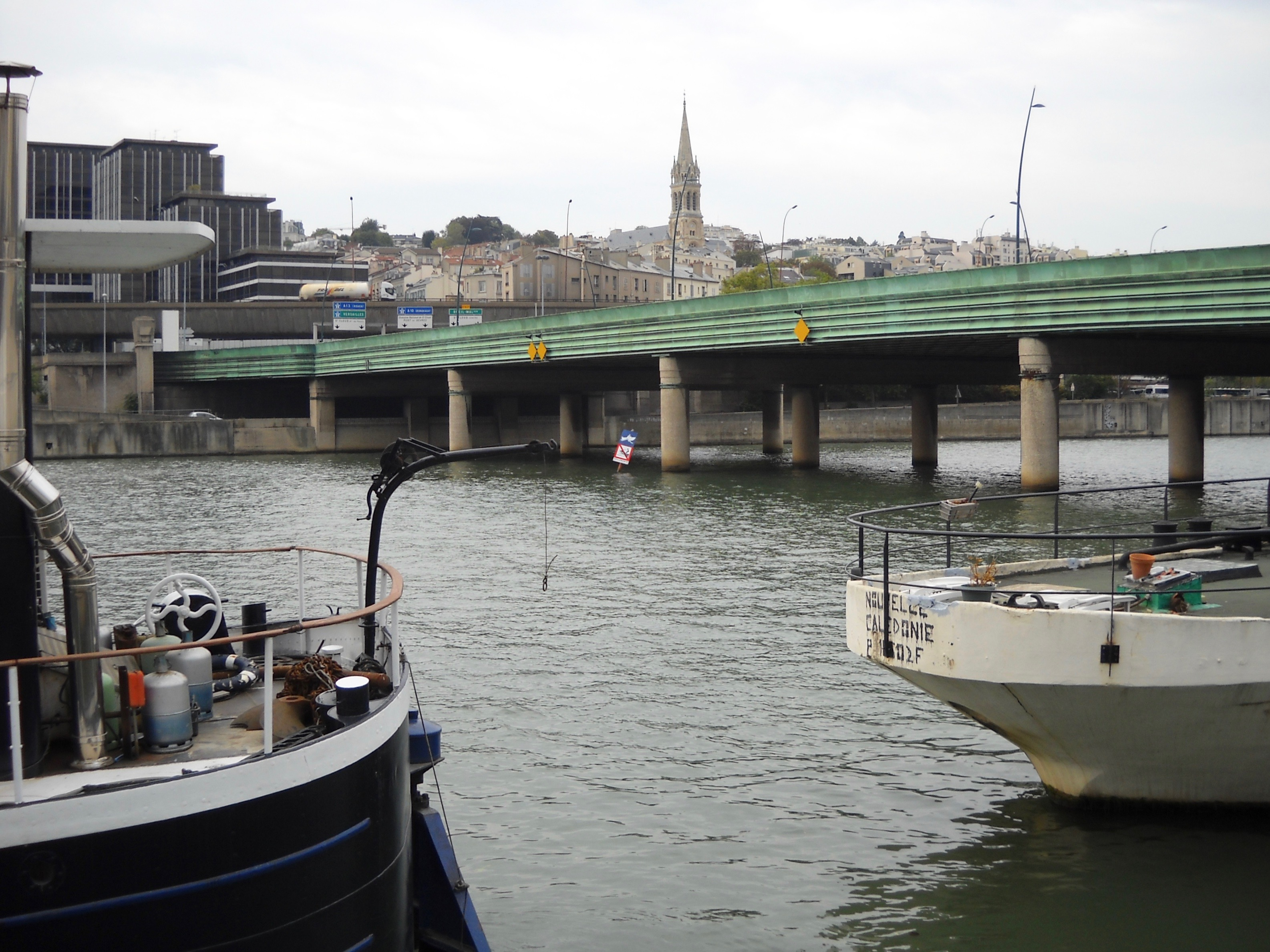
- The Pont de Saint-Cloud in 2009
- Coordinates: 48°50′28″N 2°13′25″E
- Carries: Seven lanes of the D907
- Crosses: Seine
- Locale: Saint-Cloud
- Preceded by: Pont de Sèvres
- Followed by: Pont de Suresnes

Characteristics
- Design: Concrete and metal deck
- Total length: 186 m (610.2 ft)
- Design life: Modern bridge (1940–present); stone bridge 1808-1940 (destroyed); stone bridge 1547-1808 (destroyed); wooden bridge 1307-1547 (destroyed); wooden bridge AD 841-1307 (destroyed)

History
- Opened: 1940; 85 years ago

The Pont de Saint-Cloud (French: [pɔ̃ d(ə) sɛ̃ klu]; Bridge of Saint-Cloud) is a metal bridge which crosses the Seine between the communes of Boulogne-Billancourt and Saint-Cloud in the department of Hauts-de-Seine just west of Paris, France.

== History ==
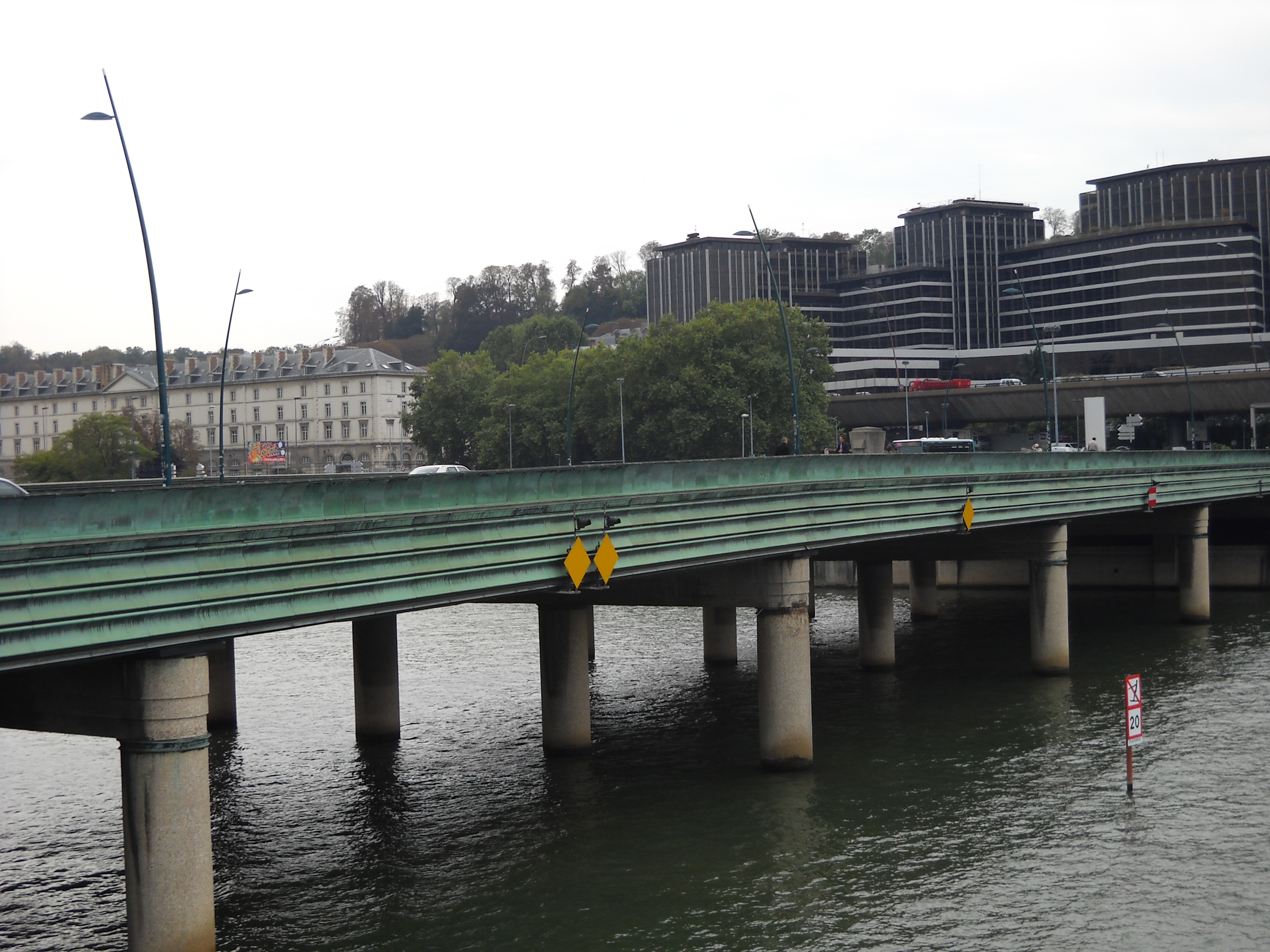
Pont de Saint-Cloud

The first Pont de Saint-Cloud appeared in 841 because of a conflict between Charles the Bald et Lothaire I; it consisted of a wooden bridge supporting several mills. Although the Seine has been traversable at this location for twelve centuries, tradition holds that no king of France has traversed it on the bridge without suffering a sudden death. As a result, sovereigns crossed the Seine by boat. The wooden bridge was demolished after the death of François I. In 1556 his son Henri II constructed a new stone bridge consisting of eleven arches.

This bridge was in turn demolished during the Second Fronde and replaced with a bridge made of wooden arches. Napoléon ordered its renovation in 1808, giving it a new width of 12.8 metres (14.0 yd). It was again reconstructed in 1940, expanded another 30 metres (33 yd) for a total width of 186 metres (203 yd). The single-piece deck crosses the entire river, supported by six columns of reinforced concrete. To facilitate circulation across the banks, underground passages have been built on the two sides of the river.

A Métro station, Boulogne–Pont de Saint-Cloud, the western terminus of Line 10 in Boulogne-Billancourt, has been named after the bridge.

== Painting ==
- The bridge was the subject of a work by Alfred Sisley, Le Pont de Saint-Cloud, 1877, and Maurice Loirand, Environs du pont de Saint-Cloud, 1953, which is in the collections of the Musée des Beaux-Arts de Nantes.
- Genevieve Pezet, painter and sculptor, had her studio from 1958 to 1965 in a barge anchored at the bridge of Saint-Cloud.
