= Kamenný Most =

Kamenný Most may refer to places:

- Kamenný Most (Kladno District), a municipality and village in the Czech Republic
- Kamenný Most (Nové Zámky District), a municipality and village in Slovakia
- Charles Bridge, a historic bridge in Prague, Czech Republic, once known as Kamenný most

== See also ==
- Bolshoy Kamenny Bridge
