= Čistiny =

Nature reserve in Slovakia

Coordinates: 47.8672°N 18.6358°E

- Interactive map of Čistiny
- Area: 1.78 km^{2} (0.69 sq mi)
- Established: 2001
- Governing body: ŠOP - S-CHKO Dunajské luhy

Čistiny is a nature reserve in the Slovak municipality of Kamenný Most. It covers an area of 17,8 ha and has a protection level of 4 on national level. The national nature reserve was declared to protect the remnants of halophyte vegetation. Čistiny is located close to the Kamenínske slanisko national nature reserve with which it creates the biggest halophilous vegetation habitat remaining in Slovakia. Until the middle of the 20th century the area was known for its Puccinellietum limosae habitat. Recent research showed no evidence of these plants anymore.
