= Stone Bridge =

Stone Bridge may refer to:

== Bridges ==
- Stone Bridge (Adana), across the Seyhan River in Adana, Turkey
- Stone Bridge (Saint Petersburg), across Griboedov Canal in Saint Petersburg, Russia
- Stone Bridge (Skopje), across the Vardar River in Skopje, Macedonia
- Stone Bridge (Manassas), an American Civil War landmark in Manassas National Battlefield Park
- Stone Bridge (Regensburg), across the Danube in Regensburg, Germany
- Stone Bridge (Rhode Island), across the Sakonnet River in Rhode Island
- Stone Bridge (Riga), across the Daugava in Riga, Latvia
- Stone Bridge (Johnstown, Pennsylvania), historic railroad bridge across the Conemaugh River in Johnstown, Pennsylvania
- Stone Bridge (Estonia), former bridge in Tartu, Estonia
- Stone Bridge (Arkansas River), in Chaffee County, Colorado
- Stone Bridge, Chelmsford, across the River Can in Essex, England
- Jincheon Nongdari Bridge stone bridge in North Chungcheong Province, South Korea, over 1000 years old, constructed solely of stones (no binding material used, just stones linking together)

== Other uses ==
- Stone Bridge Press, an American publishing company
- Stone Bridge High School, Ashburn, Virginia, United States

== See also ==
- Zidani Most (Stone Bridge), a town and an important railway junction in Slovenia
- Pont de Pierre (disambiguation)
- Ponte Pietra (Verona) (Italian for Stone Bridge), a Roman bridge across the Adige in Verona, Italy
- Puente de Piedra (Zaragoza) (Stone Bridge), a historic bridge across the Ebro River in Zaragoza, Spain
- Bolshoy Kamenny Bridge, across the Moskva River in Moscow, Russia (Greater Stone Bridge in Russian, although the bridge is steel)
- Kamenný Most (disambiguation) (Stone Bridge in Czech)
- Pol Sangi, across the Quri River in Tabriz, Iran (Stone Bridge in Farsi)
- Stonebridge (disambiguation)
- Stoneybridge
