= Pont de Pierre =

Pont de Pierre may refer to the following bridges:

- Pont de Pierre (Aosta), a Roman bridge in Aosta, Italy
- Pont de Pierre (Bordeaux), a 19th-century bridge in Bordeaux, France

== See also ==
- Stone Bridge (disambiguation)
