= Hôtel de Ville, Saint-Cloud =

Town hall in Saint-Cloud, France

Hôtel de Ville
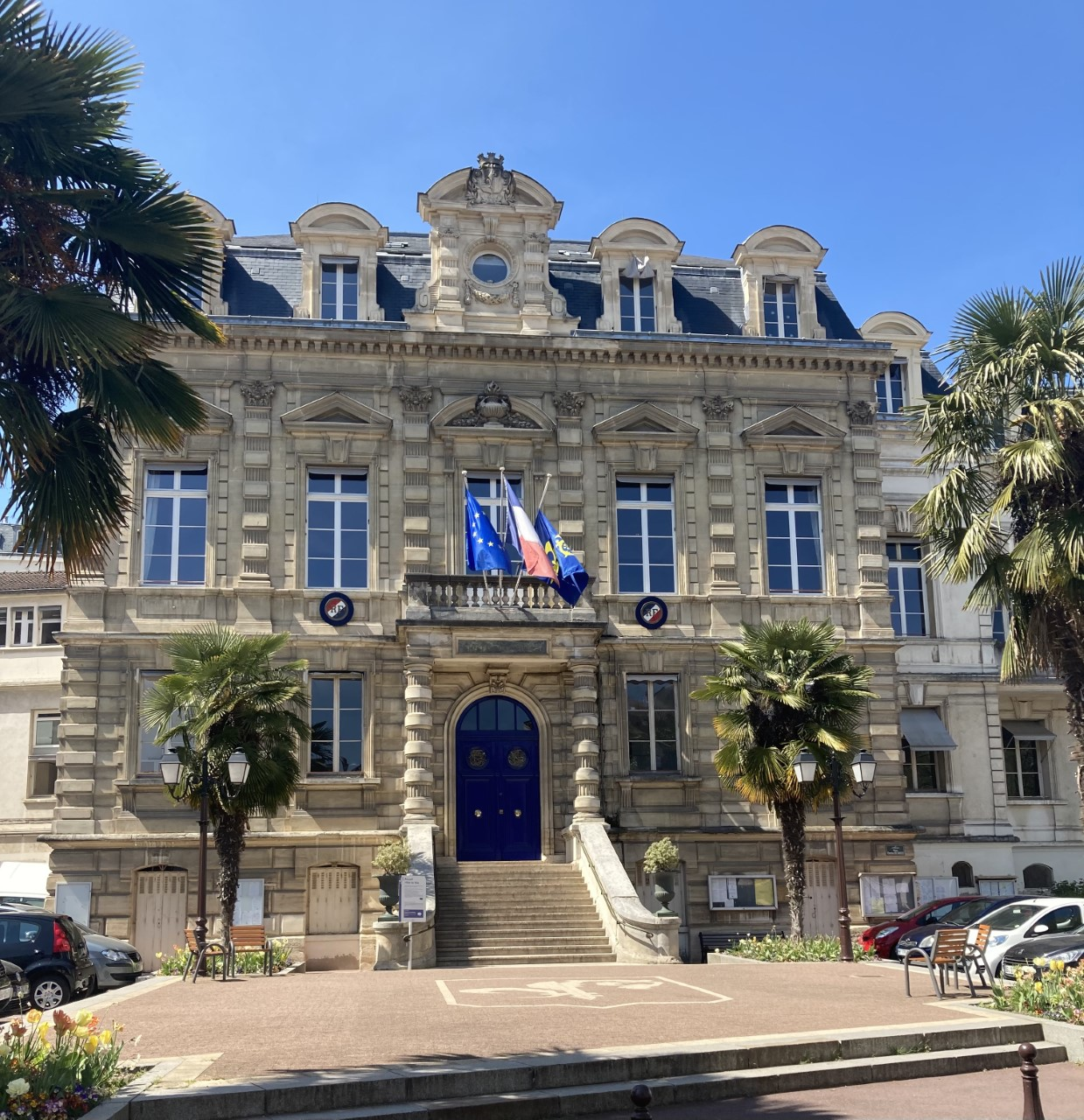
- The main frontage of the Hôtel de Ville in April 2021
- Interactive map of the Hôtel de Ville area

General information
- Type: City hall
- Architectural style: Neoclassical style
- Location: Saint-Cloud, France
- Coordinates: 48.8437°N 2.2191°E
- Completed: 1874

Design and construction
- Architect: Julien Bérault

The Hôtel de Ville (French pronunciation: [otɛl də vil], City Hall) is a municipal building in Saint-Cloud, Hauts-de-Seine in the western suburbs of Paris, standing on Place Charles-de-Gaulle. It has been included on the Inventaire général des monuments by the French Ministry of Culture since 1996.

== History ==
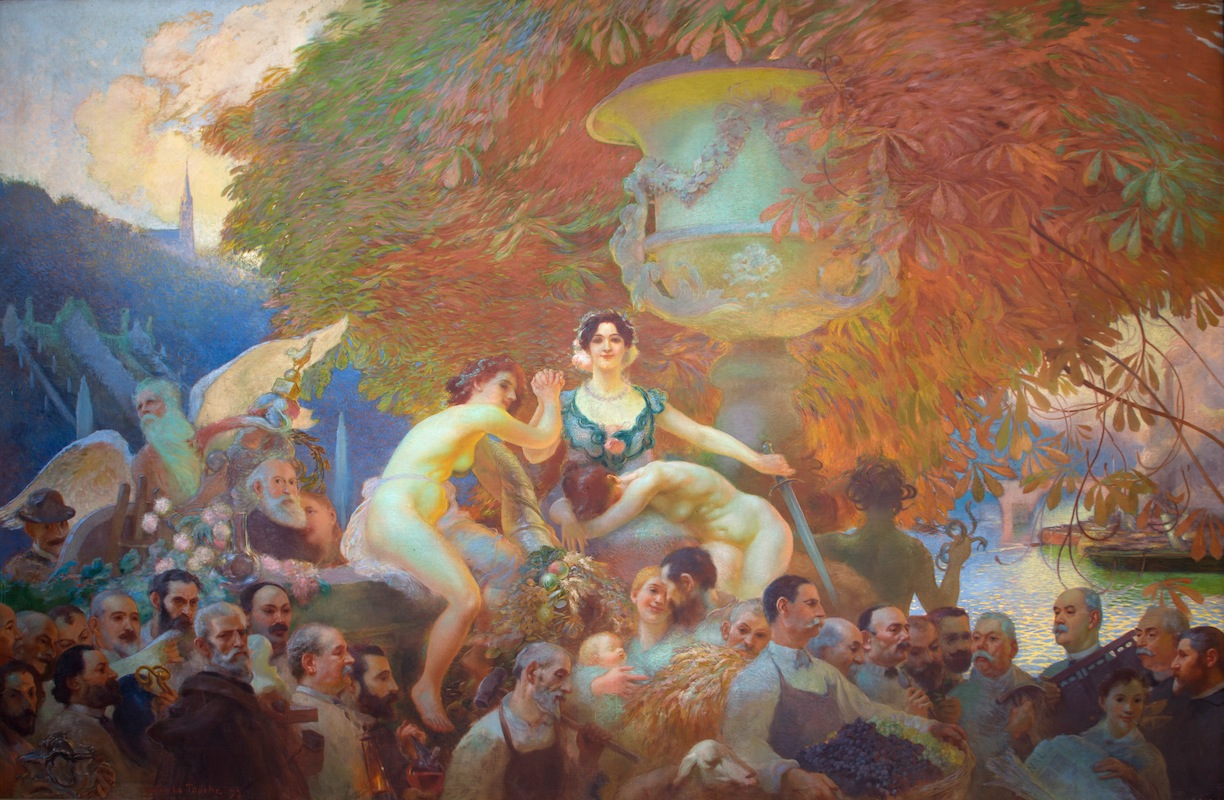
L'Allégorie de la Paix by Gaston La Touche, 1897

Following the French Revolution, the town council decided to establish a modest town hall on Rue Haute (now Rue du Docteur Desfossez) in 1791. However, in 1860, the council agreed to demolish the old town hall to consolidate the site needed for the Church of Saint-Clodoald. The project to commission a major church in centre of the town had been a priority ever since Queen Marie Antoinette, the proprietor of the Château de Saint-Cloud, had laid the foundations for the church in 1778.

The council led by the mayor, Louis Ambroise Germain, agreed to commission a new town hall in 1868. The site they selected was just to the north of the old town hall. The emperor, Napoleon III, who lived at the Château de Saint-Cloud in spring and autumn each year, made a substantial donation to the cost of construction. The new building was designed by the municipal architect, Julien Bérault, in the neoclassical style and was built in ashlar stone. Construction was delayed by the Franco-Prussian War of 1870 and only recommended in April 1873. It was officially opened in 1874.

The design involved a symmetrical main frontage of five bays facing onto what is now Place Charles-de-Gaulle. The central bay featured a flight of steps leading up to a round headed doorway with an archivolt and a keystone, flanked by banded and fluted columns supporting a balustraded balcony. On the first floor, there was a French door with a keystone and a segmental pediment. At roof level, there was modillioned cornice and a panel contained an oculus flanked by pilasters supporting a segmental pediment with a coat of arms in the tympanum. The outer bays were fenestrated by casement windows with keystones on the ground floor, by casement windows with keystones and triangular pediments on the first floor, and by dormer windows at attic level. All the first-floor bays were flanked by banded and fluted Corinthian order pilasters. Internally, the principal rooms were the Salle des Mariages (wedding room) which was decorated with four murals by Gaston La Touche, depicting the four seasons. He also painted a large mural entitled L'Allégorie de la Paix (The Allegory of Peace) depicting local scenes and personalities.

The building was extended to the north by an extra four bays, with the end bays projected forward, in a similar style but with less ornate finishings, to a design by the municipal architect, Henri Renard, in 1924.

Following the Paris insurrection on 19 August 1944, during the Second World War, a member of the French Resistance, Pierre Pujol, attempted to size the town hall and was nearly executed by German troops for his action. This was a week before the official liberation of the town by the French 2nd Armoured Division, commanded by General Philippe Leclerc, on 25 August 1944.

The building was extended to the rear, with extensive new office space, to a design by a local architect, Maurice Benezech, in 1966.
