= Kamenný Most (Kladno District) =

- Municipality
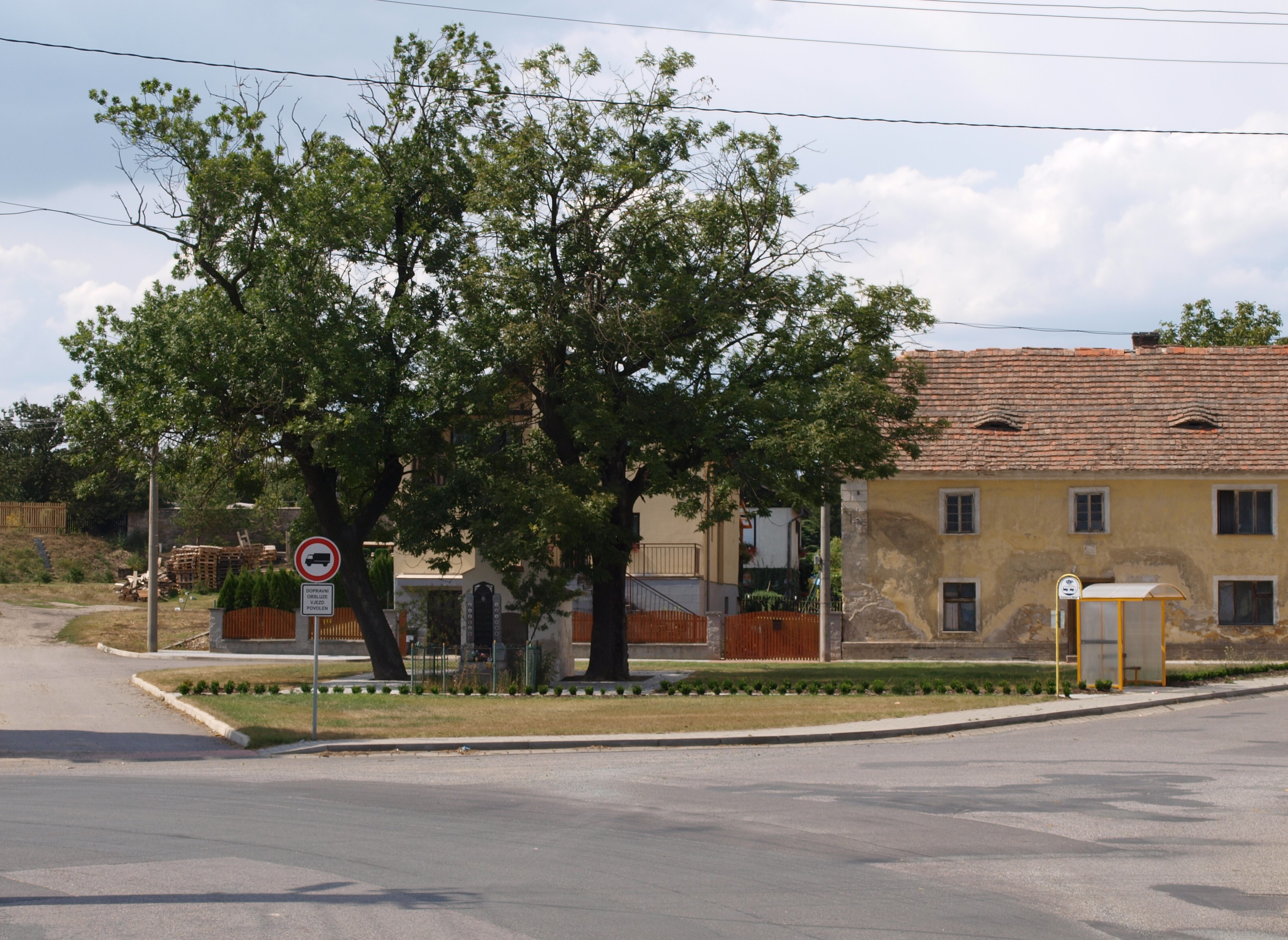
- Centre of Kamenný Most

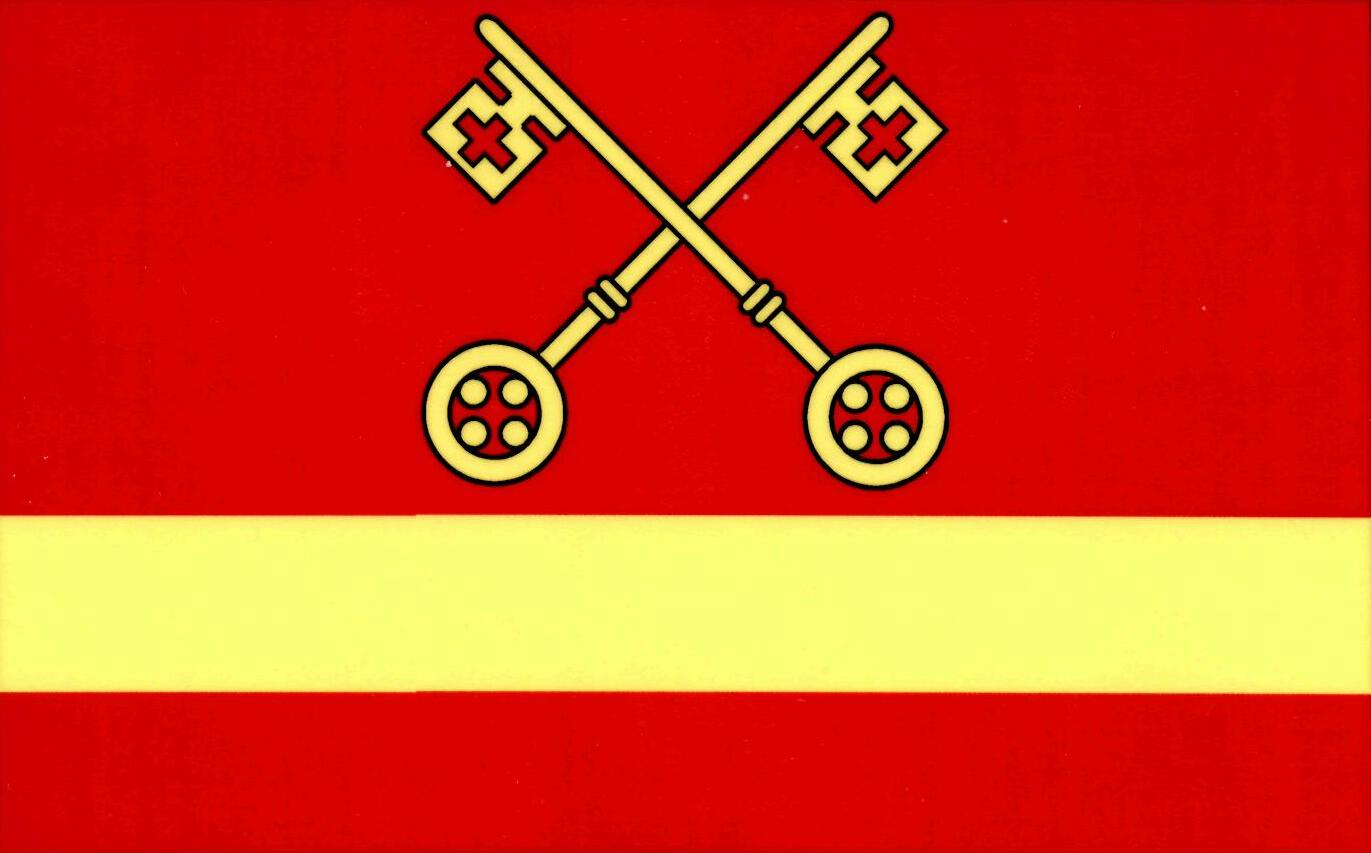
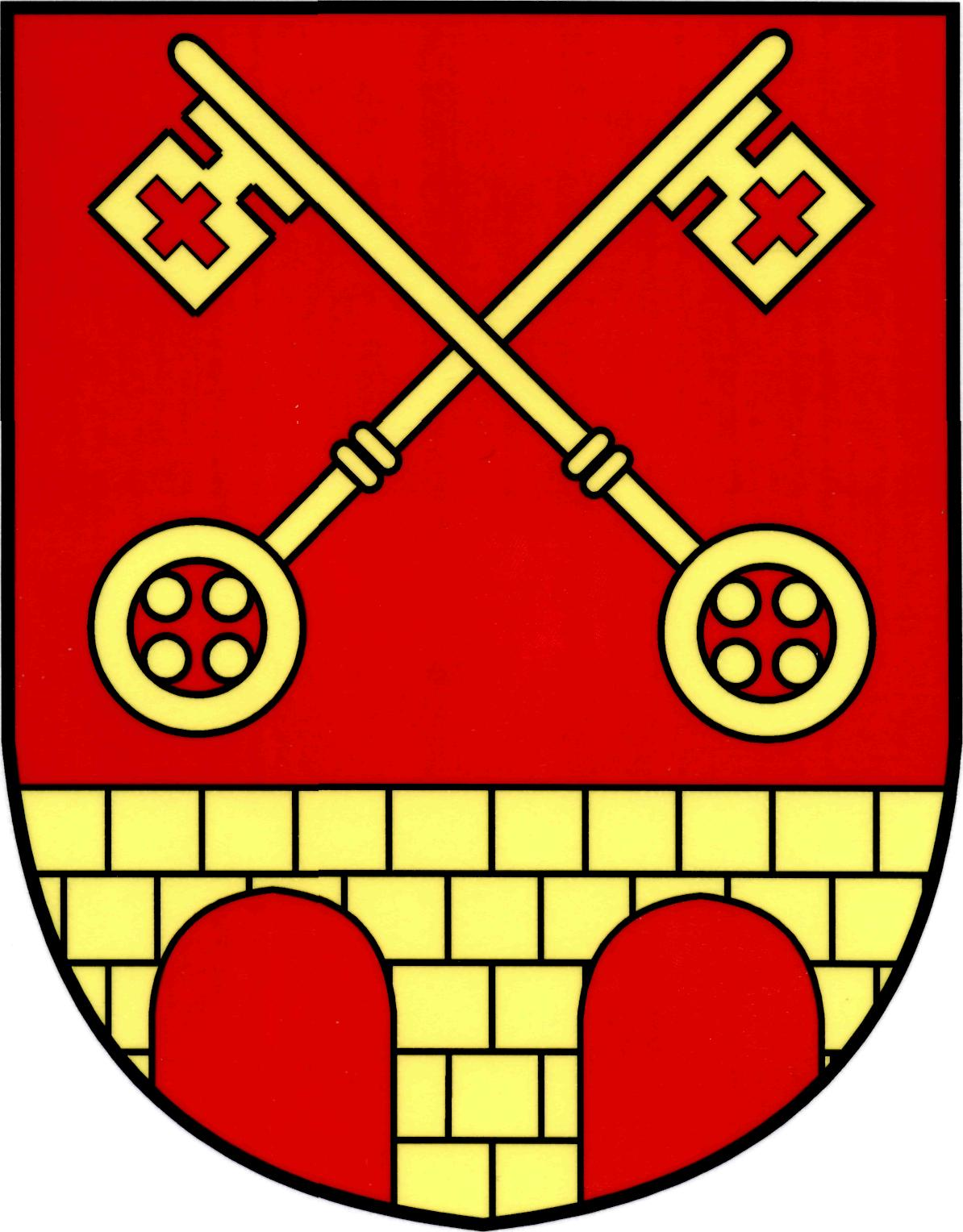
- Flag Coat of arms

- Location in the Czech Republic
- Coordinates: 50°14′29″N 14°12′21″E
- Country: Czech Republic
- Region: Central Bohemian
- District: Kladno
- First mentioned: 1088

Area
  - Total: 3.28 km^{2} (1.27 sq mi)
- Elevation: 200 m (660 ft)

Population (2026-01-01)
  - Total: 429
  - Density: 131/km^{2} (339/sq mi)
- Time zone: UTC+1 (CET)
  - Summer (DST): UTC+2 (CEST)
- Postal code: 273 26
- Website: kamennymost.tode.cz

Kamenný Most is a municipality and village in Kladno District in the Central Bohemian Region of the Czech Republic. It has about 400 inhabitants.

== Etymology ==
The name means 'stone bridge' in Czech. At the time when the village was founded, arched stone bridges were not built yet, but there was probably some kind of bridging, for which stone was also used as a material.

== Geography ==
Kamenný Most is located about 13 kilometres (8 mi) northeast of Kladno and 20 km (12 mi) northwest of Prague. It lies in a flat agricultural landscape, on the border between the Lower Ohře Table and Prague Plateau.

== History ==
The first written mention of Kamenný Most is from 1088, when it was owned by the Vyšehrad Chapter.

== Demographics ==
Historical population

Year	Pop.	±%
1869	381	—
1880	470	+23.4%
1890	526	+11.9%
1900	481	−8.6%
1910	518	+7.7%

Year	Pop.	±%
1921	513	−1.0%
1930	581	+13.3%
1950	515	−11.4%
1961	491	−4.7%
1970	541	+10.2%

Year	Pop.	±%
1980	451	−16.6%
1991	353	−21.7%
2001	377	+6.8%
2011	400	+6.1%
2021	402	+0.5%

Source: Censuses

== Transport ==
Kamenný Most is located on the railway line Louny–Kralupy nad Vltavou.

== Sights ==
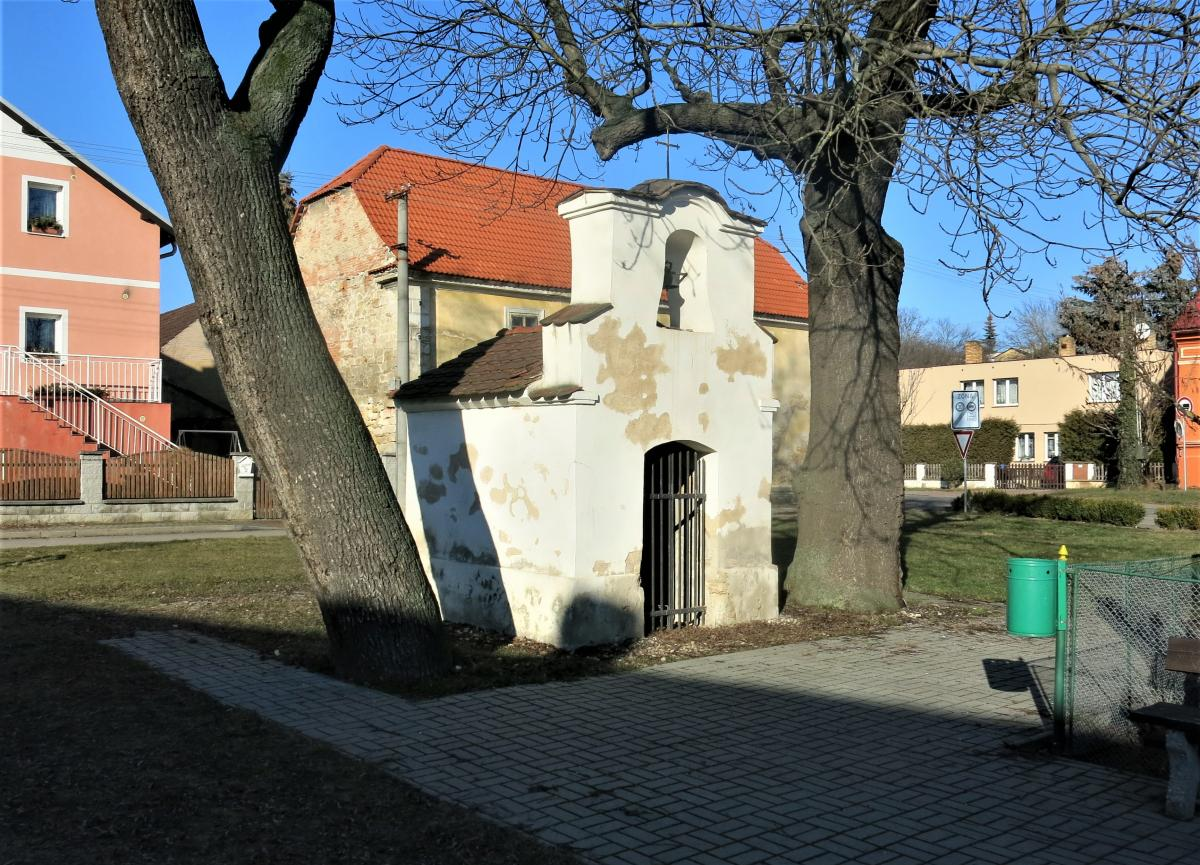
Chapel in the centre of Kamenný Most

The main landmark of Kamenný Most is a small late Baroque chapel. It was built in the second half of the 18th century.

West of the village on a hill stands a 1 metre (3.3 ft) tall sandstone engraving of a Latin cross. Some consider it a menhir, but it is probably just a medieval border stone.
