= Saint-Cloud =

- Commune
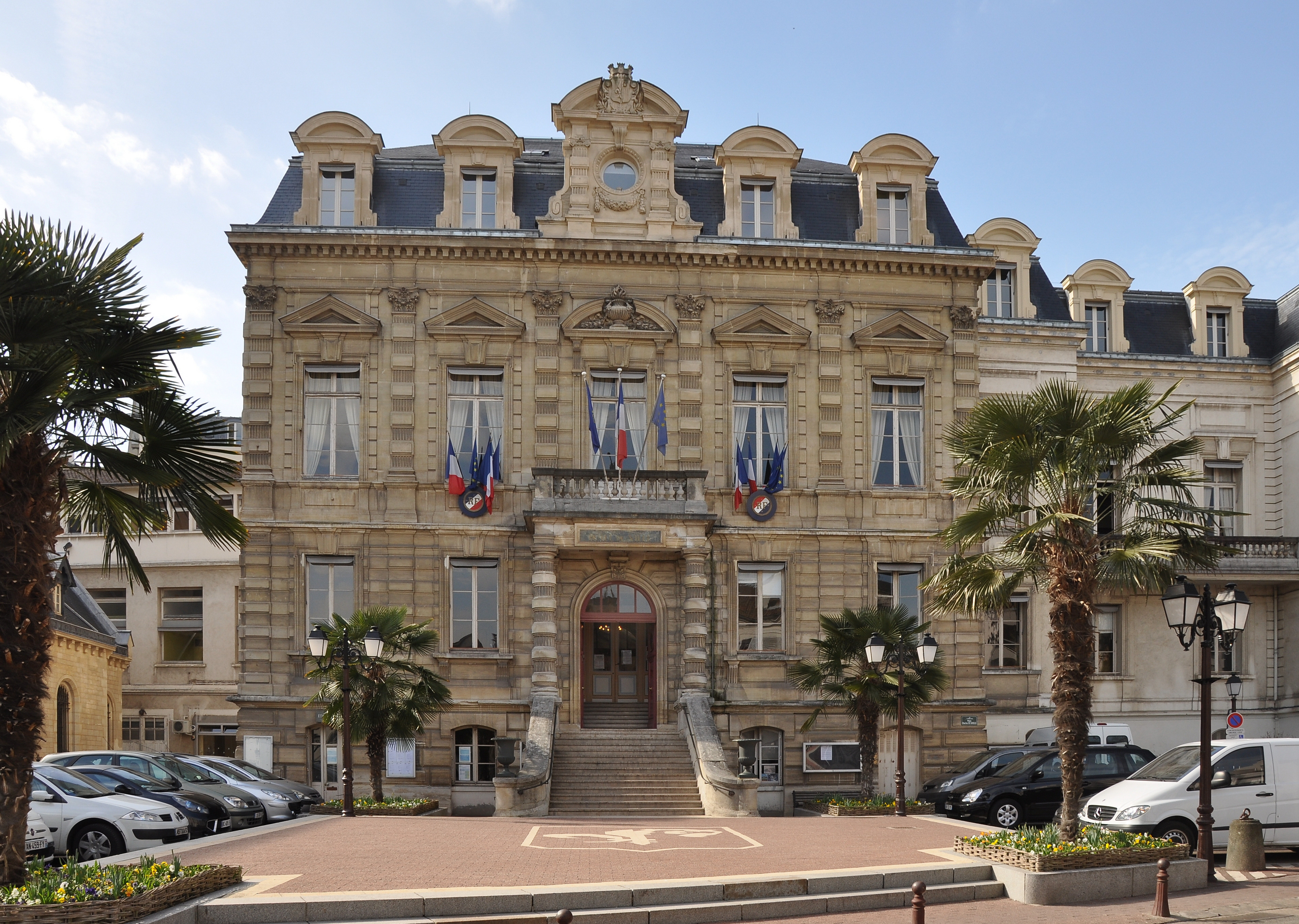
- The Hôtel de Ville

- Coat of arms

- Location (in red) within Paris inner suburbs
- Location of Saint-Cloud
- Location within France Location within Île-de-France (region)
- Coordinates: 48°50′N 2°13′E
- Country: France
- Region: Île-de-France
- Department: Hauts-de-Seine
- Arrondissement: Nanterre
- Canton: Saint-Cloud
- Intercommunality: Grand Paris

Government
  - Mayor (2026–32): Éric Berdoati (DVD)
- Area^{1}: 7.56 km^{2} (2.92 sq mi)
- Elevation: 136 m (446 ft)
- Population (2023): 29,855
  - Density: 3,950/km^{2} (10,200/sq mi)
- Time zone: UTC+01:00 (CET)
  - Summer (DST): UTC+02:00 (CEST)
- INSEE/Postal code: 92064 /92210
- Website: saintcloud.fr
- ^{1} French Land Register data, which excludes lakes, ponds, glaciers > 1 km^{2} (0.386 sq mi or 247 acres) and river estuaries.

Saint-Cloud ([sɛ̃ klu]) is a French commune in the western suburbs of Paris, France, 10 kilometres (6 miles) from the centre of Paris. Like other communes of Hauts-de-Seine such as Marnes-la-Coquette, Neuilly-sur-Seine and Vaucresson, Saint-Cloud is one of France's wealthiest towns, with the second-highest average household income of communities with 10,000 to 50,000 households.

Saint-Cloud is home to the International Bureau of Weights and Measures (BIPM), located in the Parc de Saint-Cloud's Pavillon de Breteuil.

== History ==
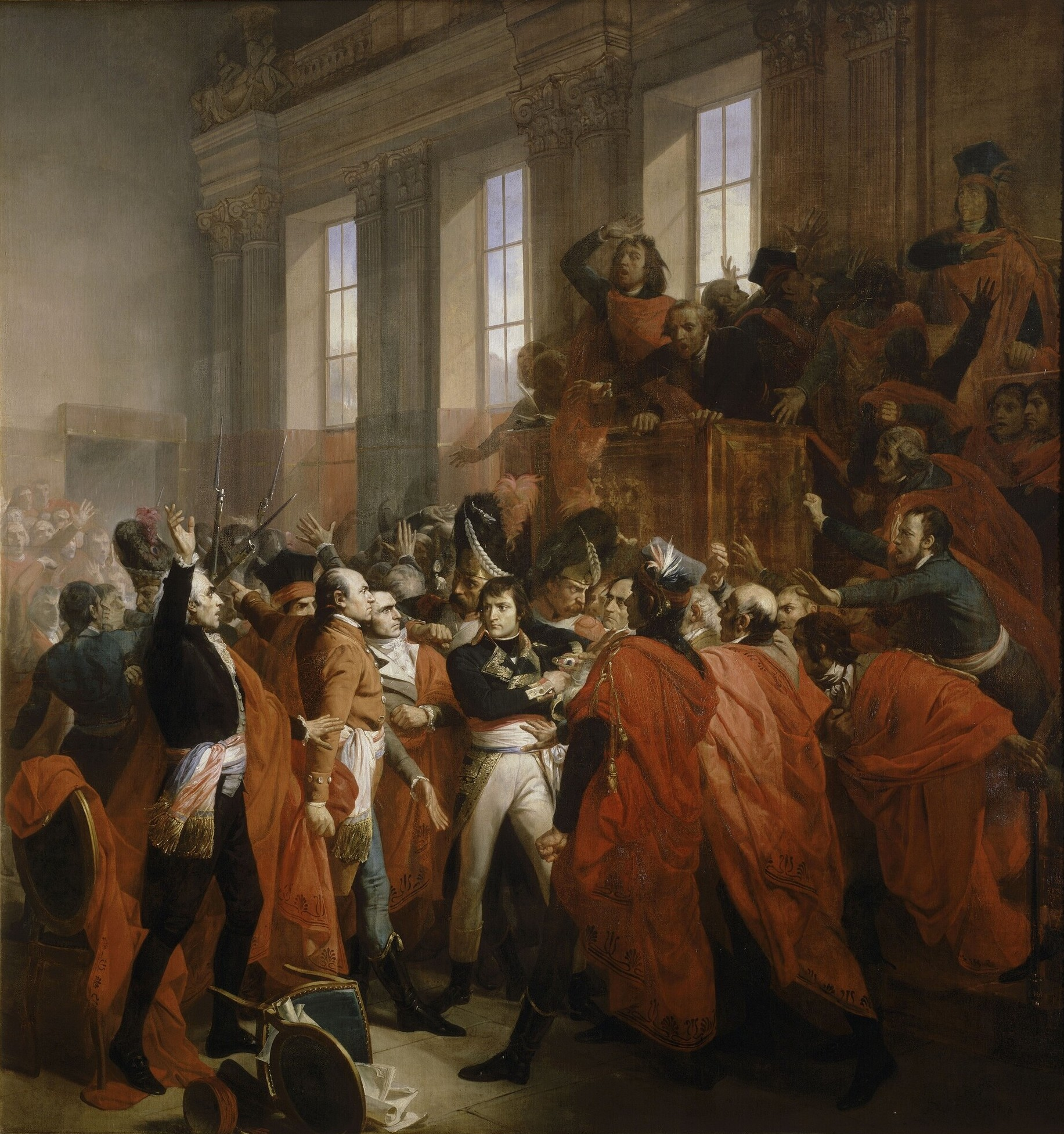
Bonaparte at the Council of Five Hundred at Saint-Cloud by François Bouchot, 1840.

The town is named after Clodoald, grandson of Clovis, who is supposed to have sought refuge in a hamlet on the Seine near Paris, then named Novigentum, like many other newly founded mercantile settlements outside the traditional towns. After he was canonized, the village where his tomb was located took the name of Sanctus Clodoaldus.

A park contains the ruins of the Château de Saint-Cloud, built in 1572 and destroyed by fire in 1870 during the Franco-Prussian War. The château was the residence of several French rulers and served as the main country residence of the cadet Orléans line until the French Revolution. The palace was also the site of the coup d'état led by Napoleon Bonaparte that overthrew the French Directory in 1799.

The town is also famous for the Saint-Cloud porcelain produced there from 1693 to 1766.

The Hôtel de Ville was completed in 1874.

The Headquarters of the International Criminal Police Organization (Interpol) was at 22 Rue Armengaud from 1966 until 1989, when it moved to Lyon.

== Demographics ==
Historical population

Year	Pop.	±% p.a.
1793	2,042	—
1800	1,660	−2.92%
1806	2,360	+6.04%
1821	1,953	−1.25%
1831	1,935	−0.09%
1836	2,316	+3.66%
1841	3,417	+8.09%
1846	3,457	+0.23%
1851	3,828	+2.06%
1856	4,405	+2.85%
1861	5,611	+4.96%
1866	5,248	−1.33%
1872	8,956	+9.32%
1876	4,862	−14.16%
1881	4,126	−3.23%
1886	5,380	+5.45%
1891	5,660	+1.02%
1896	6,374	+2.40%
1901	7,195	+2.45%

Year	Pop.	±% p.a.
1906	8,354	+3.03%
1911	9,725	+3.09%
1921	11,921	+2.06%
1926	13,519	+2.55%
1931	16,341	+3.86%
1936	16,597	+0.31%
1946	17,614	+0.60%
1954	20,671	+2.02%
1962	26,472	+3.14%
1968	28,158	+1.03%
1975	28,139	−0.01%
1982	28,561	+0.21%
1990	28,597	+0.02%
1999	28,157	−0.17%
2007	29,542	+0.60%
2012	29,436	−0.07%
2017	29,973	+0.36%
2023	29,855	−0.07%

Source: EHESS and INSEE (1968–2023)

== Main sights ==
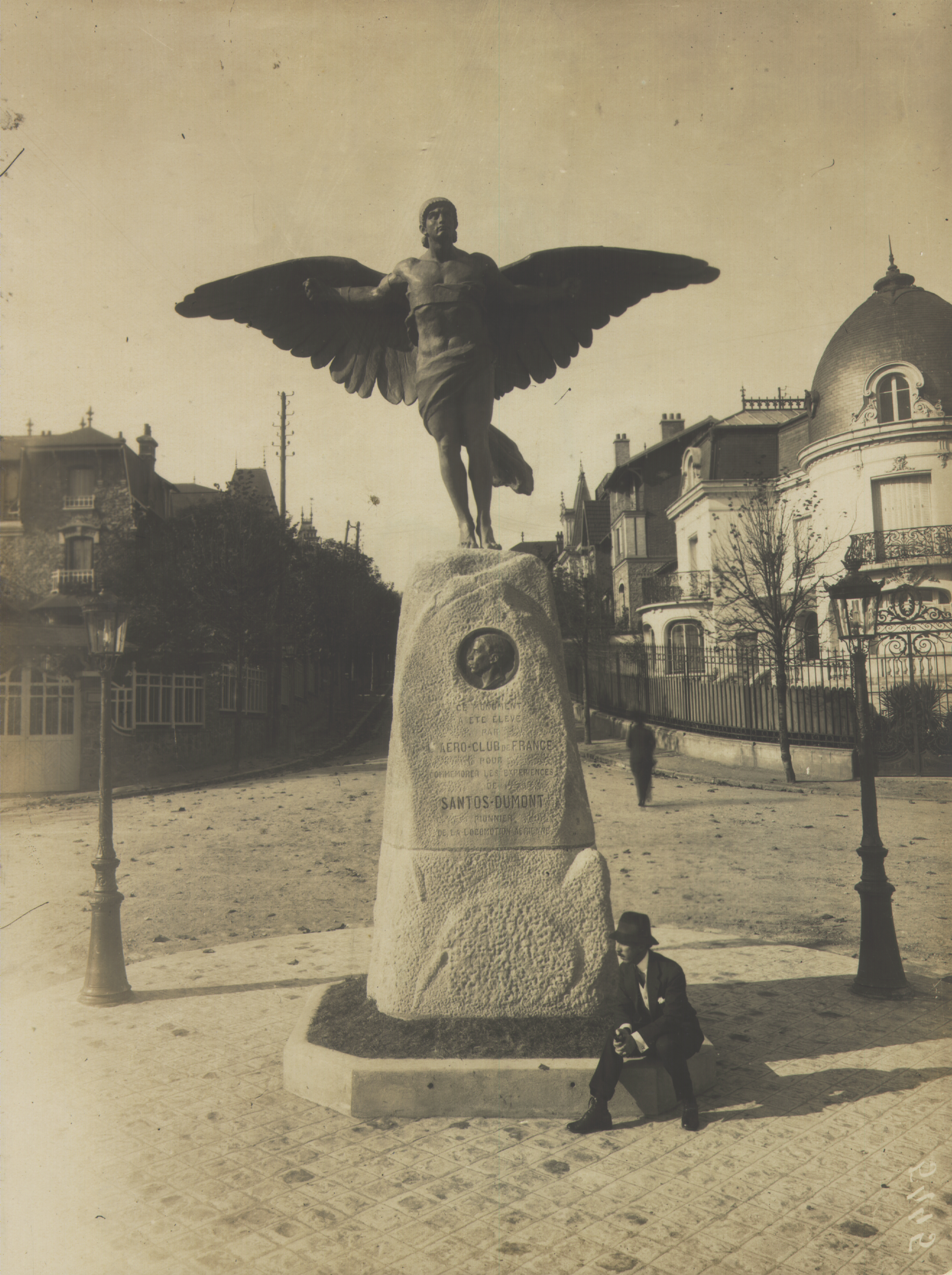
Santos Dumont posing near the statue in his honour in 1913.

The main landmarks are the park of the demolished Château de Saint-Cloud and the Pavillon de Breteuil. The Saint-Cloud Racecourse, a racetrack for Thoroughbred flat racing, was built by Edmond Blanc in 1901 and hosts a number of important races, including the annual Grand Prix de Saint-Cloud.

=== Tribute to Santos-Dumont ===
On the Avenue de Longchamp is a bronze statue commissioned by the Airclub of France representing the Greek mythological figure Icarus, in honour of Alberto Santos-Dumont. Inaugurated on October 19, 1913, it sits on a square near the old Aerostation of Saint-Cloud, where Santos-Dumont performed his experiments with heavier-than-air aircraft. Santos-Dumont was also responsible for the construction of the world's first hangar. A replica has occupied the hangar's site in Saint-Cloud since 1952 after the original was destroyed for its bronze during the Nazi military occupation.

== Transport ==
Saint-Cloud is served by two stations on the Transilien La Défense and Paris-Saint-Lazare suburban rail lines: Le Val d'Or and Saint-Cloud.

The town is also served by tramway Line T2, which runs alongside the Seine.

Central Saint-Cloud, known as le village, is also served by Boulogne–Pont de Saint-Cloud on Line 10, just across the Seine in Boulogne-Billancourt, on the opposite side of the Pont de Saint-Cloud.

By the end of 2031, Saint-Cloud is also expected to be connected to Line 15 of the Paris metro, which is currently under construction.

== Hospital ==
- René Huguenin Hospital

== Education ==
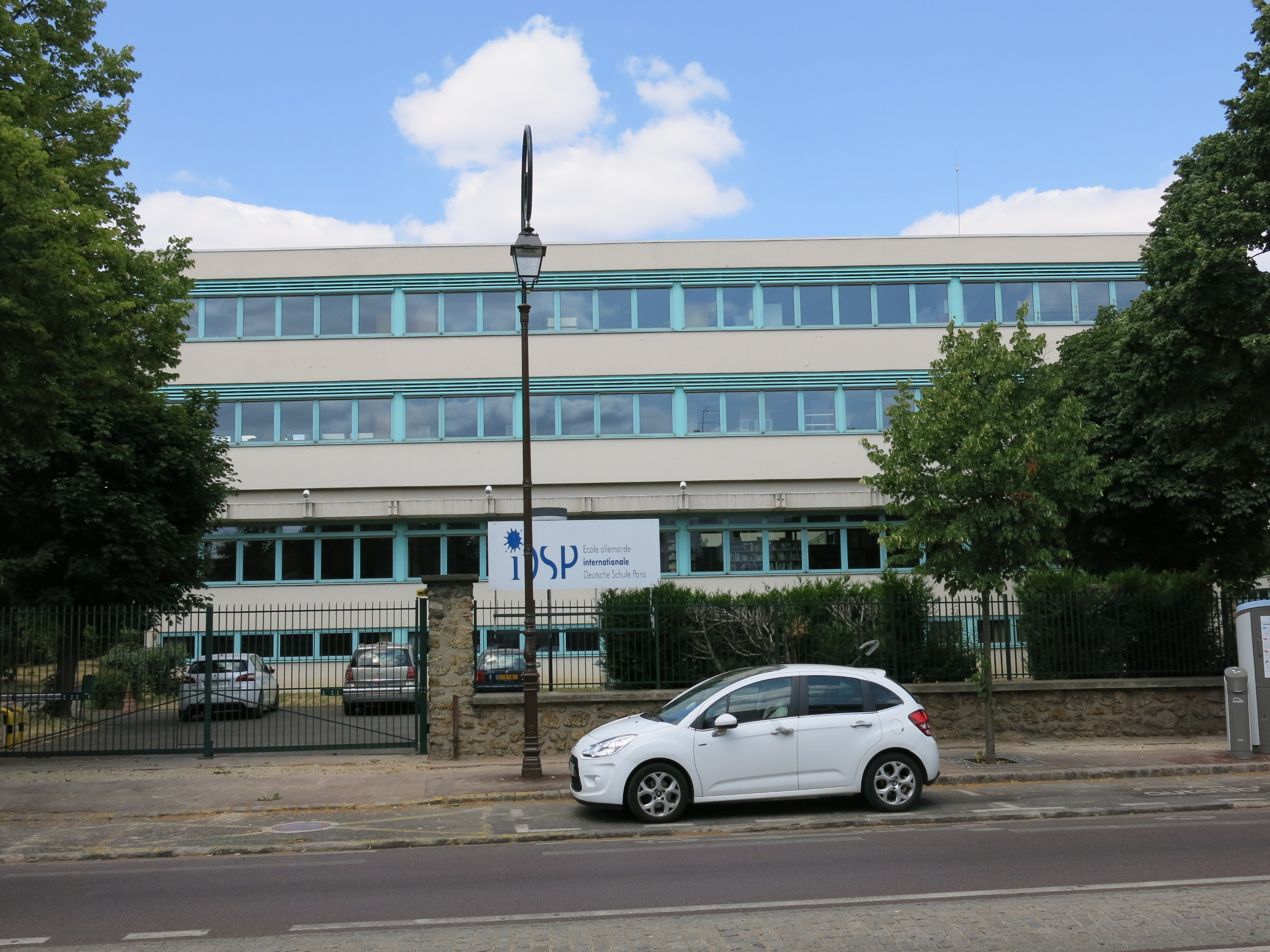
Internationale Deutsche Schule Paris

Public high schools:

- Lycée Alexandre-Dumas
- Lycée Santos-Dumont

It is also served by the public high school Lycée Jean Pierre Vernant in Sèvres.

Private high schools:

- Institution Saint-Pie-X

International schools:

- American School of Paris
- Internationale Deutsche Schule Paris (German school)

A campus of the Paris Nanterre University is also located in the city.

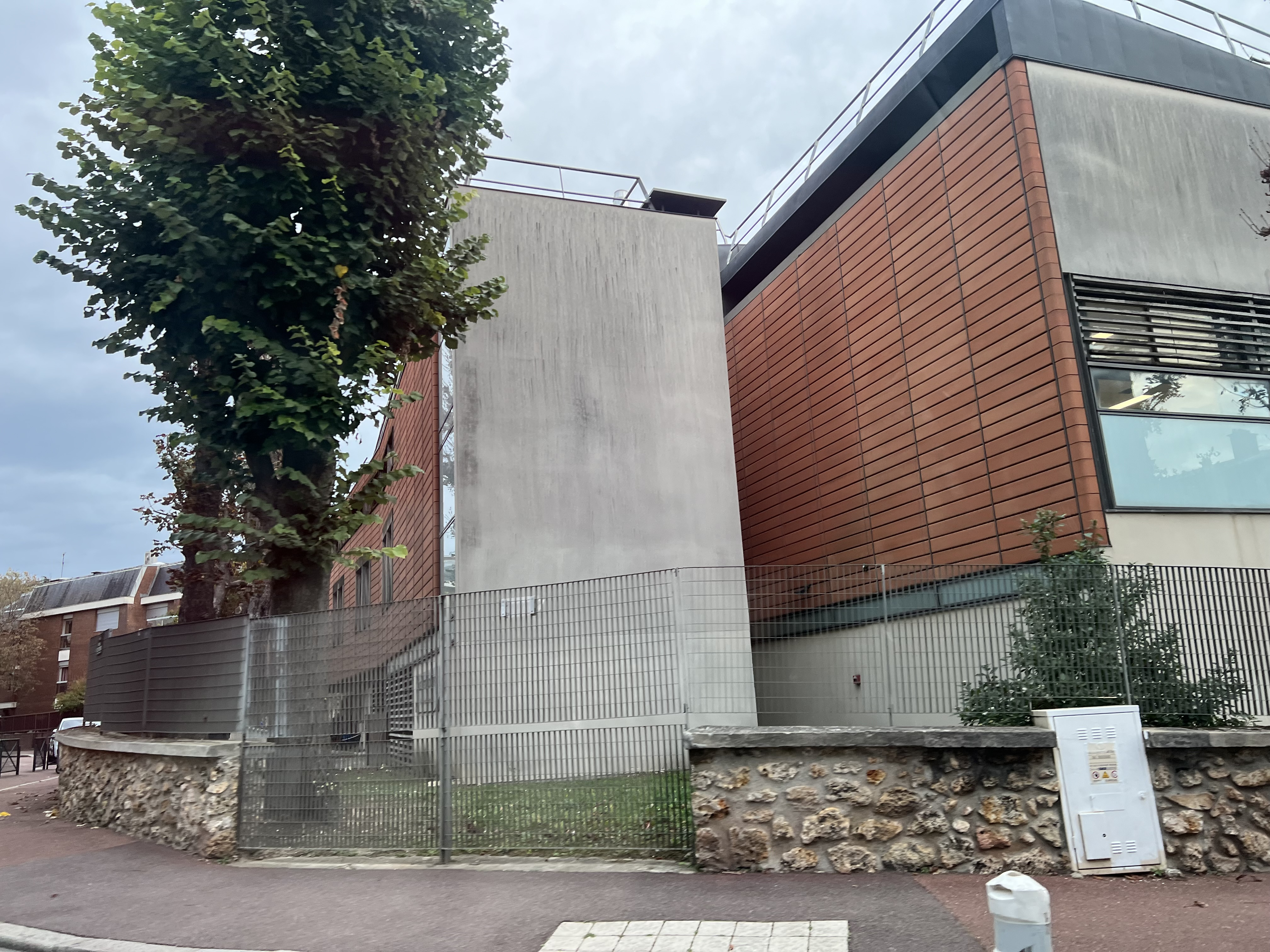
Paris Nanterre University Saint-Cloud campus

== Personalities ==
=== Notable births ===
- Philippe II, Duke of Orléans (1674–1723), Regent of France from 1715 to 1723
- Élisabeth Charlotte d'Orléans (1676–1744), Regent of Lorraine, lived at the Palace at Saint-Cloud
- Louis Philippe II, Duke of Orléans (1747–1793), a key figure during the early stages of the French Revolution;
- Princess Marie Bonaparte (1882–1962), psychoanalyst, closely linked with Sigmund Freud
- Gilbert Norman (1914–1944), Special Operations Executive member
- Annick Gendron, painter
- Nicole Courcel (1930–2016), film actress
- Jean-Claude Killy (born 1943), alpine skier and a triple Olympic champion
- Gérard Manset (born 1945), known as Manset, rock songwriter
- Hervé Guibert (1955–1991), writer
- Mino Cinelu (born 1957), musician
- Alexandra Fusai (born 1973), former professional tennis player
- Marie Silin (born 1979), member of parliament
- Magalie Poisson (born 1982), Olympic rhythmic gymnast
- Paul Lasne (born 1989), footballer
- Ingmar Lazar (born 1993), classical pianist, prodigy

=== Notable residents ===
- Henri III of France (1551–1589), King of France, assassinated in Saint-Cloud
- Philippe d'Orléans (1640–1701) lived in the Château de Saint-Cloud from 1658 to his death in 1701
- Henrietta of England (1644–1670) lived and died in the Château de Saint-Cloud
- Napoléon I (1769–1821) lived in the Château de Saint-Cloud
- Antoine Sénard (1800–1885), member of the National Assembly, mayor of Saint-Cloud from 1871 to 1874
- Émile Verhaeren (1855–1916), Flemish poet
- André Chevrillon (1864–1957), French author
- Florent Schmitt (1870–1958), French composer
- Maurice Ravel (1875–1937), French composer
- Marcel Dassault (1892–1986), French businessman and politician
- Alberto Santos-Dumont (1873–1932), Brazilian inventor and aviation pioneer
- Lino Ventura (1919–1987), Italian actor, lived and died in Saint-Cloud
- Jean-Pierre Fourcade (born 1929), French Minister, mayor of Saint-Cloud from 1971 to 1992
- Christophe Dominici (1972–2020), rugby union player for France and Stade Français
- Gérard Holtz (born 1946), French sports journalist
- Jean-Marie Le Pen, French politician, owner of Domaine de Montretout in Saint-Cloud

=== Notable burials ===
- Alimardan Topchubashov (1863–1934)
- Edmond Blanc (1856–1920)
- René Alexandre (1885–1946)
- Maurice Bessy (1910–1993), author of A Pictorial History of Magic and The Supernatural (1963)
- Gérard Blain (1930–2000)
- Gilbert Grandval (1904–1981)
- Fernand Gravey (1905–1970)
- Jean-René Huguenin (1936–1962)
- Dorothy Jordan (1761–1816)
- Vlado Perlemuter (1904–2002)
- Andrée Servilange (1911–2001)
- Jean Toulout (1887–1962)
- Maurice Yvain (1891–1965)

== Twin towns – sister cities ==
Saint-Cloud is twinned with:

- Bad Godesberg (Bonn), Germany
- Boadilla del Monte, Spain
- Frascati, Italy
- Kortrijk, Belgium
- St. Cloud, Florida, United States
- St. Cloud, Minnesota, United States
- Windsor and Maidenhead, England, United Kingdom

== In popular culture ==
Saint-Cloud is the main setting of the 1955 French film Les Diaboliques (a.k.a. Diabolique).

== See also ==
- Communes of the Hauts-de-Seine department
