= Stonebridge Ranch, Texas =

Planned community in Texas, USA

Stonebridge Ranch is a planned community in McKinney, Collin County, Texas, United States.

== History ==
Originally planned as a large community of luxury homes and facilities, building began on the 6000-acre site in the mid-1980s. The development faced problems in 1988 when Gibraltar Savings Association, the savings and loan institution backing it for an estimated $300 million (and 17% owned by the family of the project's developer) became insolvent. The federal government intervened, taking over the property, selling again it in 1990 for only $61 million. Such losses were a common outcome in the government's disposal of real estate assets during the bailouts of the savings and loan crisis. Ownership transferred to Yukio Kitano, representing the largest-ever Japanese investment in Texas real estate at the time. Construction has continued over the following decades.

== Amenities ==
Stonebridge Ranch has private leisure facilities including pools and golf courses, as well as a community center, which are all overseen by its community association.

The area contains six elementary schools and two middle schools. McKinney and Frisco Independent School Districts offer education to high school students. It is also the location of Methodist McKinney Hospital and Stonebridge United Methodist Church. Commercial activity is concentrated on the Virginia Avenue Corridor and Eldorado District, including large chains, local merchants and restaurants.
