= Kamenný Most (Nové Zámky District) =

Kamenný Most Kőhídgyarmat
- Municipality
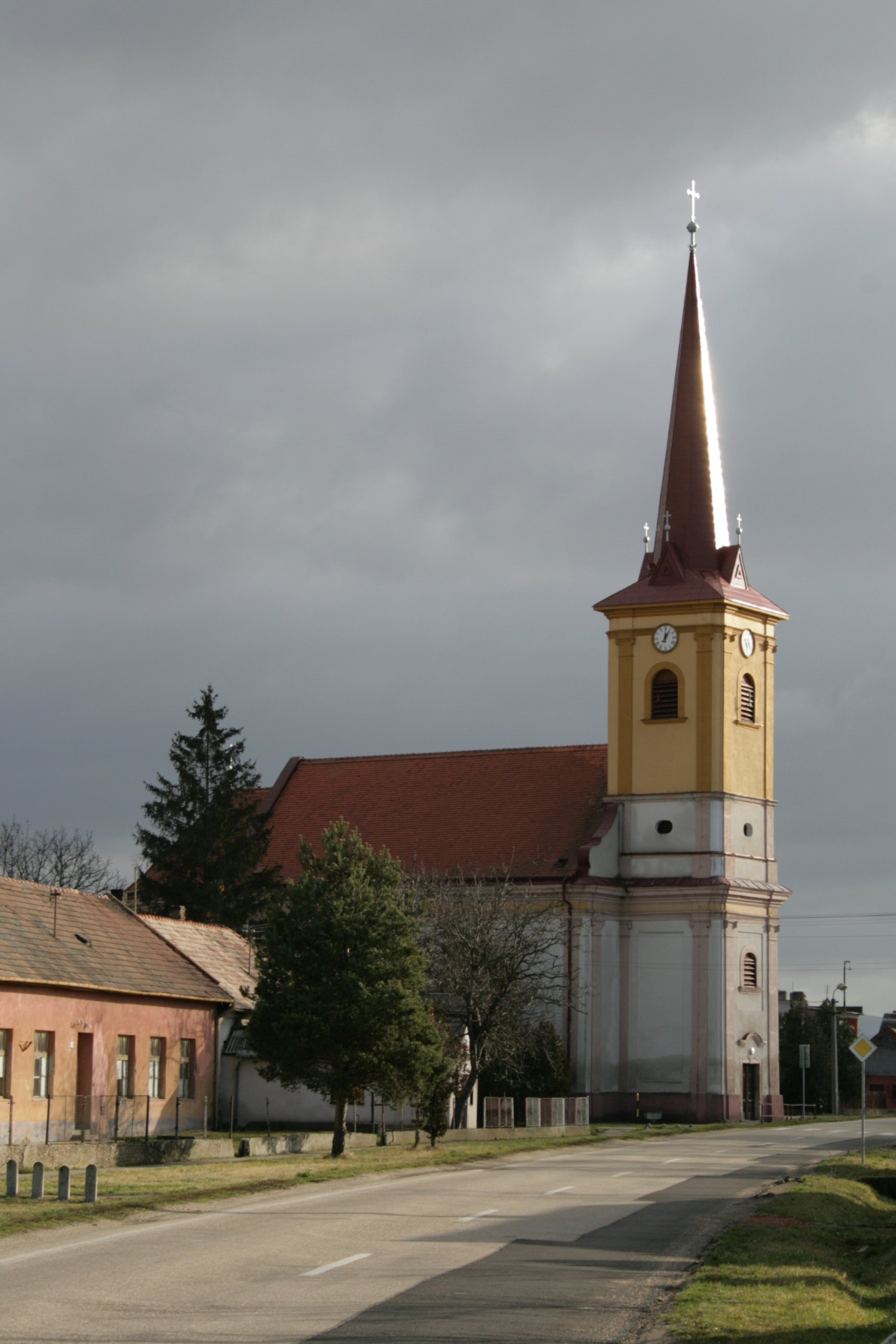

- Flag

- Location of Kamenný Most in the Nitra Region Location of Kamenný Most in Slovakia
- Coordinates: 47.85°N 18.65°E
- Country: Slovakia
- Region: Nitra Region
- District: Nové Zámky District
- First mentioned: 1271

Area
  - Total: 20.33 km^{2} (7.85 sq mi)
- Elevation: 112 m (367 ft)

Population (2025)
  - Total: 1,038
- Time zone: UTC+1 (CET)
  - Summer (DST): UTC+2 (CEST)
- Postal code: 943 58
- Area code: +421 36
- Vehicle registration plate (until 2022): NZ
- Website: www.kamenny-most.sk

Kamenný Most (Hungarian: Kőhídgyarmat) is a village and municipality in the Nové Zámky District in the Nitra Region of south-west Slovakia.

== Geography ==
The municipality lies at an altitude of 112 metres (367 ft) and covers an area of 20.33 km^{2} (7.85 sq mi) (2025).

== History ==
In historical records the village was first mentioned in 1271 After the Austro-Hungarian army disintegrated in November 1918, Czechoslovak troops occupied the area, later acknowledged internationally by the Treaty of Trianon. Between 1938 and 1945 Kamenný Most once more became part of Miklós Horthy's Hungary through the First Vienna Award. From 1945 until the Velvet Divorce, it was part of Czechoslovakia. Since then it has been part of Slovakia.

== Population ==
Population statistic (10 years)
Year	1995	2005	2015	2025
Count	1063	1060	1050	1038
Difference		−0.28%	−0.94%	−1.14%

Population statistic
Year	2024	2025
Count	1032	1038
Difference		+0.58%

It has a population of 1038 people (31 December 2025).

=== Ethnicity ===
Census 2021 (1+ %)
Ethnicity	Number	Fraction
Hungarian	857	80.84%
Slovak	167	15.75%
Not found out	78	7.35%
Total	1060	

In year 2021 was 1060 people by ethnicity 857 as Hungarian, 167 as Slovak, 78 as Not found out, 3 as Romani, 2 as Czech, 2 as Bulgarian, 1 as German and 1 as Greek.

Note on population: The difference values of population numbers in the table "Population statistic" and in the sections "Ethnicity" & "Religion" is caused by the use of various statistical methods.

=== Religion ===
Census 2021 (1+ %)
Religion	Number	Fraction
Roman Catholic Church	765	72.17%
None	157	14.81%
Not found out	63	5.94%
Calvinist Church	25	2.36%
Greek Catholic Church	19	1.79%
Christian Congregations in Slovakia	15	1.42%
Total	1060	

In year 2021 was 1060 people by religion 765 from Roman Catholic Church, 157 from None, 63 from Not found out, 25 from Calvinist Church, 19 from Greek Catholic Church, 15 from Christian Congregations in Slovakia, 5 from Evangelical Church, 4 from Other and not ascertained christian church, 3 from Apostolic Church, 2 from Old Catholic Church, 1 from Other and 1 from Buddhism.

== Facilities ==
The village has a public library and a football pitch. It is also home to Čistiny, a national nature reserve.

== See also ==
- List of municipalities and towns in Slovakia

== Genealogical resources ==
The records for genealogical research are available at the state archive "Statny Archiv in Nitra, Slovakia"

- Roman Catholic church records (births/marriages/deaths): 1720-1895 (parish A)
