= Cantons of the Seine-Saint-Denis department =

The following is a list of the 21 cantons of the Seine-Saint-Denis department, in France, following the French canton reorganisation which came into effect in March 2015:

- Aubervilliers
- Aulnay-sous-Bois
- Bagnolet
- Le Blanc-Mesnil
- Bobigny
- Bondy
- La Courneuve
- Drancy
- Épinay-sur-Seine
- Gagny
- Livry-Gargan
- Montreuil-1
- Montreuil-2
- Noisy-le-Grand
- Pantin
- Saint-Denis-1
- Saint-Denis-2
- Saint-Ouen-sur-Seine
- Sevran
- Tremblay-en-France
- Villemomble
