= Canton of Gagny =

Administrative area in Île-de-France, France

Coordinates: 48.8833°N 2.5333°E

Gagny
- Canton
- Country: France
- Region: Île-de-France
- Department: Seine-Saint-Denis
- No. of communes: {{{nbcomm}}}
- Area: 13.69 km^{2} (5.29 sq mi)
- Population (2023): 82,113
  - Density: 5,998/km^{2} (15,530/sq mi)
- INSEE code: 93 10

The canton of Gagny is a French administrative division, located in the arrondissement of Le Raincy, in the Seine-Saint-Denis département (Île-de-France région). Its borders were modified at the French canton reorganisation which came into effect in March 2015. Its seat is in Gagny.

== Composition ==
It consists of the following communes:

- Gagny
- Neuilly-sur-Marne

== Adjacent cantons ==
- Canton of Livry-Gargan (north)
- Canton of Tremblay-en-France (northeast)
- Canton of Villemomble (west)
- Canton of Noisy-le-Grand (south)

== See also ==
- Cantons of the Seine-Saint-Denis department
- Communes of the Seine-Saint-Denis department
