= Canton of Sevran =

Coordinates: 48.9333°N 2.5333°E

Sevran
- Canton
- Country: France
- Region: Île-de-France
- Department: Seine-Saint-Denis
- No. of communes: {{{nbcomm}}}
- Area: 17.65 km^{2} (6.81 sq mi)
- Population (2023): 94,005
  - Density: 5,326/km^{2} (13,790/sq mi)
- INSEE code: 93 19

The Canton of Sevran is a French administrative division, located in the arrondissement of Le Raincy, in the Seine-Saint-Denis département (Île-de-France région). Its borders were modified at the French canton reorganisation which came into effect in March 2015. Its seat is in Sevran.

== Composition ==
It consists of the following communes:

- Sevran
- Villepinte

== Adjacent cantons ==
- Canton of Tremblay-en-France (east)
- Canton of Aulnay-sous-Bois (west)
- Canton of Livry-Gargan (south)

== See also ==
- Cantons of the Seine-Saint-Denis department
- Communes of the Seine-Saint-Denis department
