= Arrondissement of Bobigny =

Coordinates: 48°54′25″N 2°26′22″E

Bobigny
- Arrondissement
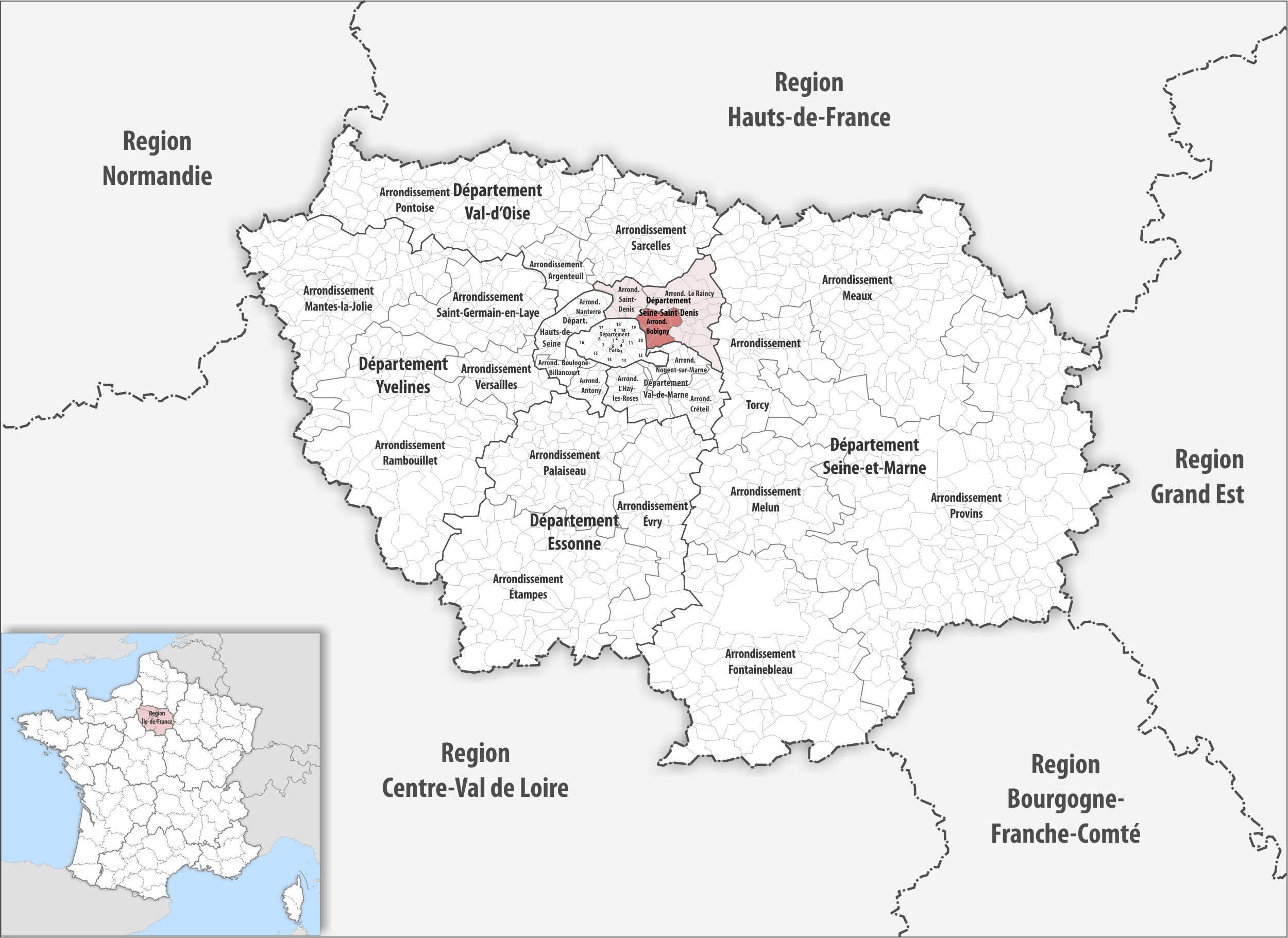
- Location within the region Île-de-France
- Country: France
- Region: Île-de-France
- Department: Seine-Saint-Denis
- No. of communes: {{{nbcomm}}}
- Area: 39.2 km^{2} (15.1 sq mi)
- Population (2023): 447,969
  - Density: 11,400/km^{2} (29,600/sq mi)
- INSEE code: 931

The arrondissement of Bobigny is an arrondissement of France in the Seine-Saint-Denis department in the Île-de-France region. It has 9 communes. Its population is 439,276 (2021), and its area is 39.2 km^{2} (15.1 sq mi).

== Composition ==
The communes of the arrondissement of Bobigny, and their INSEE codes, are:

1. Bagnolet (93006)
2. Bobigny (93008)
3. Bondy (93010)
4. Les Lilas (93045)
5. Montreuil (93048)
6. Noisy-le-Sec (93053)
7. Pantin (93055)
8. Le Pré-Saint-Gervais (93061)
9. Romainville (93063)

== History ==
The arrondissement of Bobigny was created in 1964 as part of the department Seine. In 1968 it became part of the new department Seine-Saint-Denis. The arrondissement of Saint-Denis was created in February 1993 from part of the arrondissement of Bobigny. At the January 2017 reorganisation of the arrondissements of Seine-Saint-Denis, it lost six communes to the arrondissement of Le Raincy.

As a result of the reorganisation of the cantons of France which came into effect in 2015, the borders of the cantons are no longer related to the borders of the arrondissements. The cantons of the arrondissement of Bobigny were, as of January 2015:

1. Bagnolet
2. Bobigny
3. Bondy-Nord-Ouest
4. Bondy-Sud-Est
5. Le Bourget
6. Drancy
7. Les Lilas
8. Montreuil-Est
9. Montreuil-Nord
10. Montreuil-Ouest
11. Noisy-le-Sec
12. Pantin-Est
13. Pantin-Ouest
14. Les Pavillons-sous-Bois
15. Romainville
16. Rosny-sous-Bois
17. Villemomble
