= Arrondissements of the Seine-Saint-Denis department =

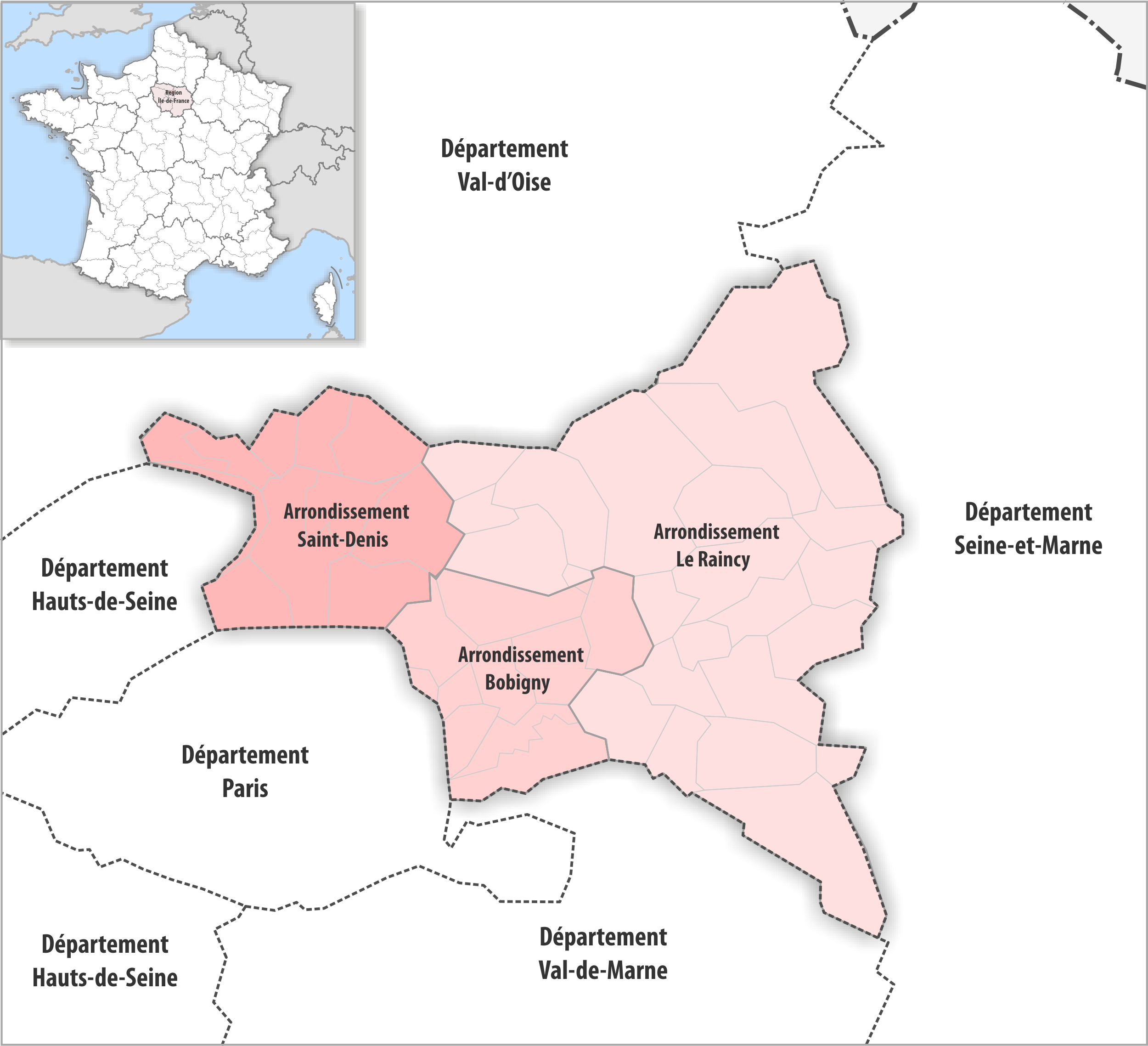
Map of arrondissements of the Seine-Saint-Denis department.

The 3 arrondissements of the Seine-Saint-Denis department are:

1. Arrondissement of Bobigny, (prefecture of the Seine-Saint-Denis département: Bobigny) with 9 communes. The population of the arrondissement was 439,276 in 2021.
2. Arrondissement of Le Raincy, (subprefecture: Le Raincy) with 22 communes. The population of the arrondissement was 777,460 in 2021.
3. Arrondissement of Saint-Denis, (subprefecture: Saint-Denis) with 9 communes. The population of the arrondissement was 451,934 in 2021.

== History ==
In 1800, the arrondissement of Saint-Denis was established as part of the department Seine. In 1962, the arrondissement of Saint-Denis was disbanded, and the arrondissement of Le Raincy was created as part of the department Seine-et-Oise. The arrondissement of Bobigny was created in 1964 as part of the department Seine. In 1968, the department Seine-Saint-Denis was created from parts of the former departments Seine and Seine-et-Oise, and the arrondissements of Bobigny and Le Raincy became part of it. The arrondissement of Saint-Denis was recreated in February 1993 from part of the arrondissement of Bobigny.

In January 2017, six communes passed from the arrondissement of Bobigny to the arrondissement of Le Raincy.
