= Canton of Tremblay-en-France =

Coordinates: 48.9500°N 2.5722°E

Tremblay-en-France
- Canton
- Country: France
- Region: Île-de-France
- Department: Seine-Saint-Denis
- No. of communes: {{{nbcomm}}}
- Area: 35.81 km^{2} (13.83 sq mi)
- Population (2023): 80,233
  - Density: 2,241/km^{2} (5,803/sq mi)
- INSEE code: 93 20

The Canton of Tremblay-en-France (French: canton de Tremblay-en-France) is a French administrative division, located in the arrondissement of Le Raincy, Seine-Saint-Denis, Île-de-France. Its borders were modified at the French canton reorganisation which came into effect in March 2015. Its seat is in Tremblay-en-France.

== Composition ==
It consists of the following communes:

- Coubron
- Montfermeil
- Tremblay-en-France
- Vaujours

== Adjacent cantons ==
- Canton of Sevran (west)
- Canton of Livry-Gargan (southwest)
- Canton of Gagny (south)

== See also ==
- Cantons of the Seine-Saint-Denis department
- Communes of the Seine-Saint-Denis department
