= Arrondissement of Le Raincy =

Coordinates: 48°53′52″N 2°31′11″E

Le Raincy
- Arrondissement
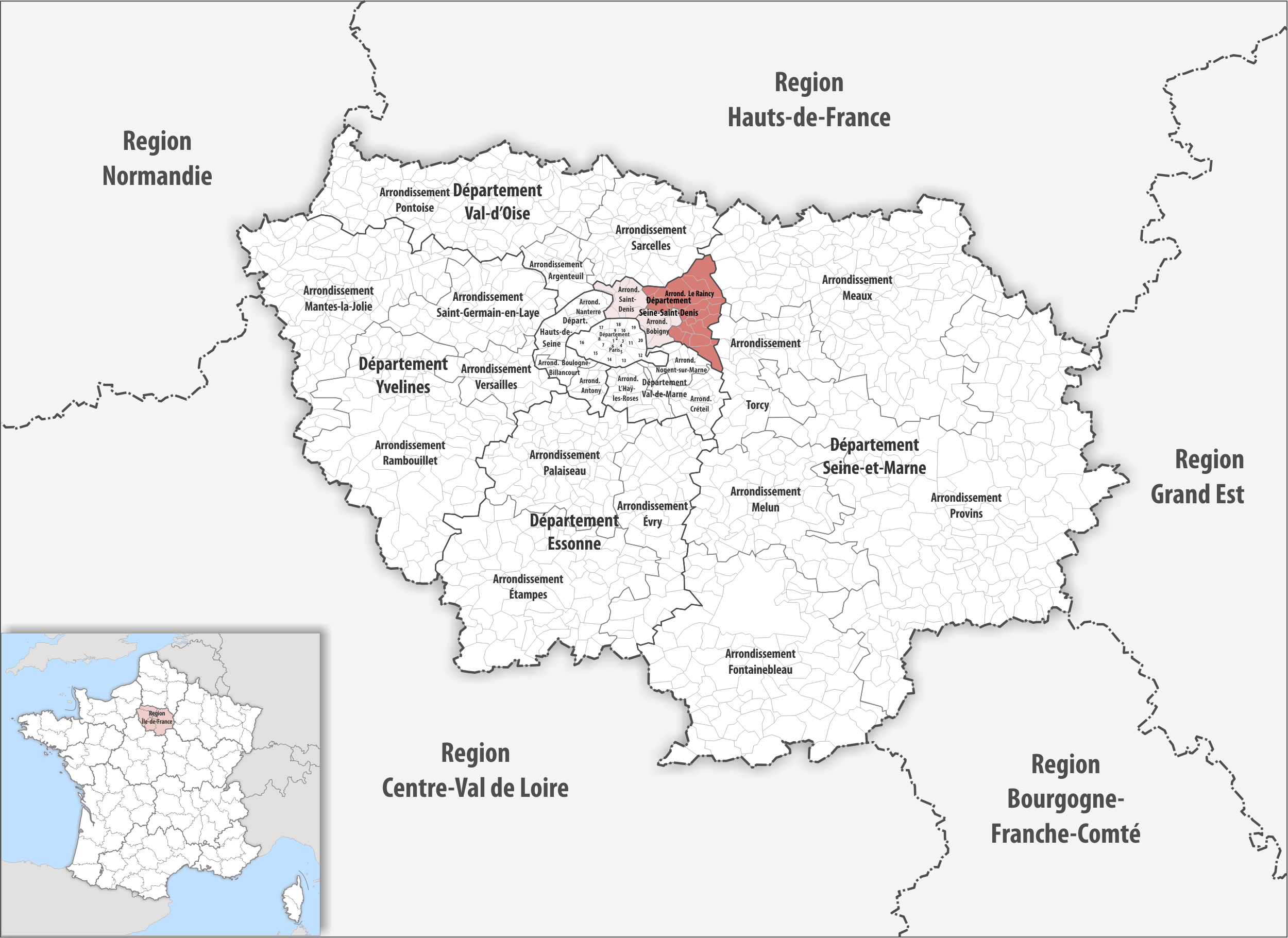
- Location within the region Île-de-France
- Country: France
- Region: Île-de-France
- Department: Seine-Saint-Denis
- No. of communes: {{{nbcomm}}}
- Area: 149.6 km^{2} (57.8 sq mi)
- Population (2023): 802,676
  - Density: 5,365/km^{2} (13,900/sq mi)
- INSEE code: 932

The arrondissement of Le Raincy is an arrondissement of France in the Seine-Saint-Denis department in the Île-de-France region. It has 22 communes. Its population is 777,460 (2021), and its area is 149.6 km^{2} (57.8 sq mi).

== Composition ==
The communes of the arrondissement of Le Raincy, and their INSEE codes, are:

1. Aulnay-sous-Bois (93005)
2. Le Blanc-Mesnil (93007)
3. Le Bourget (93013)
4. Clichy-sous-Bois (93014)
5. Coubron (93015)
6. Drancy (93029)
7. Dugny (93030)
8. Gagny (93032)
9. Gournay-sur-Marne (93033)
10. Livry-Gargan (93046)
11. Montfermeil (93047)
12. Neuilly-Plaisance (93049)
13. Neuilly-sur-Marne (93050)
14. Noisy-le-Grand (93051)
15. Les Pavillons-sous-Bois (93057)
16. Le Raincy (93062)
17. Rosny-sous-Bois (93064)
18. Sevran (93071)
19. Tremblay-en-France (93073)
20. Vaujours (93074)
21. Villemomble (93077)
22. Villepinte (93078)

== History ==
The arrondissement of Le Raincy was created in 1962 as part of the department Seine-et-Oise. In 1968 it became part of the new department Seine-Saint-Denis. At the January 2017 reorganisation of the arrondissements of Seine-Saint-Denis, it received six communes from the arrondissement of Bobigny.

As a result of the reorganisation of the cantons of France which came into effect in 2015, the borders of the cantons are no longer related to the borders of the arrondissements. The cantons of the arrondissement of Le Raincy were, as of January 2015:

1. Aulnay-sous-Bois-Nord
2. Aulnay-sous-Bois-Sud
3. Le Blanc-Mesnil
4. Gagny
5. Livry-Gargan
6. Montfermeil
7. Neuilly-Plaisance
8. Neuilly-sur-Marne
9. Noisy-le-Grand
10. Le Raincy
11. Sevran
12. Tremblay-en-France
13. Villepinte
