= Livry =

Livry may refer to:

== Places in France ==
- Livry, Calvados
- Livry, Nièvre
- Livry-Gargan, in the Seine-Saint-Denis department
- Livry-Louvercy, in the Marne department
- Livry-sur-Seine, in the Seine-et-Marne department

== People ==
- Emma Livry (1842–1863), French ballerina
- Henri de Livry (1884-1979), French actor known for Notre Dame van de sloppen, Histoire vraie and Dropped from Heaven
- François Sanguin de Livry (fl. 1720), French ambassador to Poland
- François-Hyppolite Sanguin, marquis of Livry (18th century), who built the Château de Bénouville

== Other uses ==
- Gare de Livry-sur-Seine, a station on the Transilien Paris-Lyon railway line
- Canton of Livry-Gargan, a canton of the Seine-Saint-Denis department
