= Renovation of Paris =

The Renovation of Paris may refer to:

- Haussmann's renovation of Paris, a renovation of Paris commissioned by Napoleon III and directed by Georges-Eugène Haussmann from 1853 to 1870.
- Sarkozy's renovation of Paris, better known as Grand Paris, an ongoing public works program with the goal of improving Paris and its suburbs.
