= Canton of Saint-Denis-1 =

Canton of Saint-Denis-1 may refer to 2 administrative divisions in France:

- Canton of Saint-Denis-1, Seine-Saint-Denis, in Seine-Saint-Denis department, Île-de-France
- Canton of Saint-Denis-1, Réunion, in Réunion
