= Hôtel de Ville, Sevran =

Town hall in Sevran, France

Hôtel de Ville
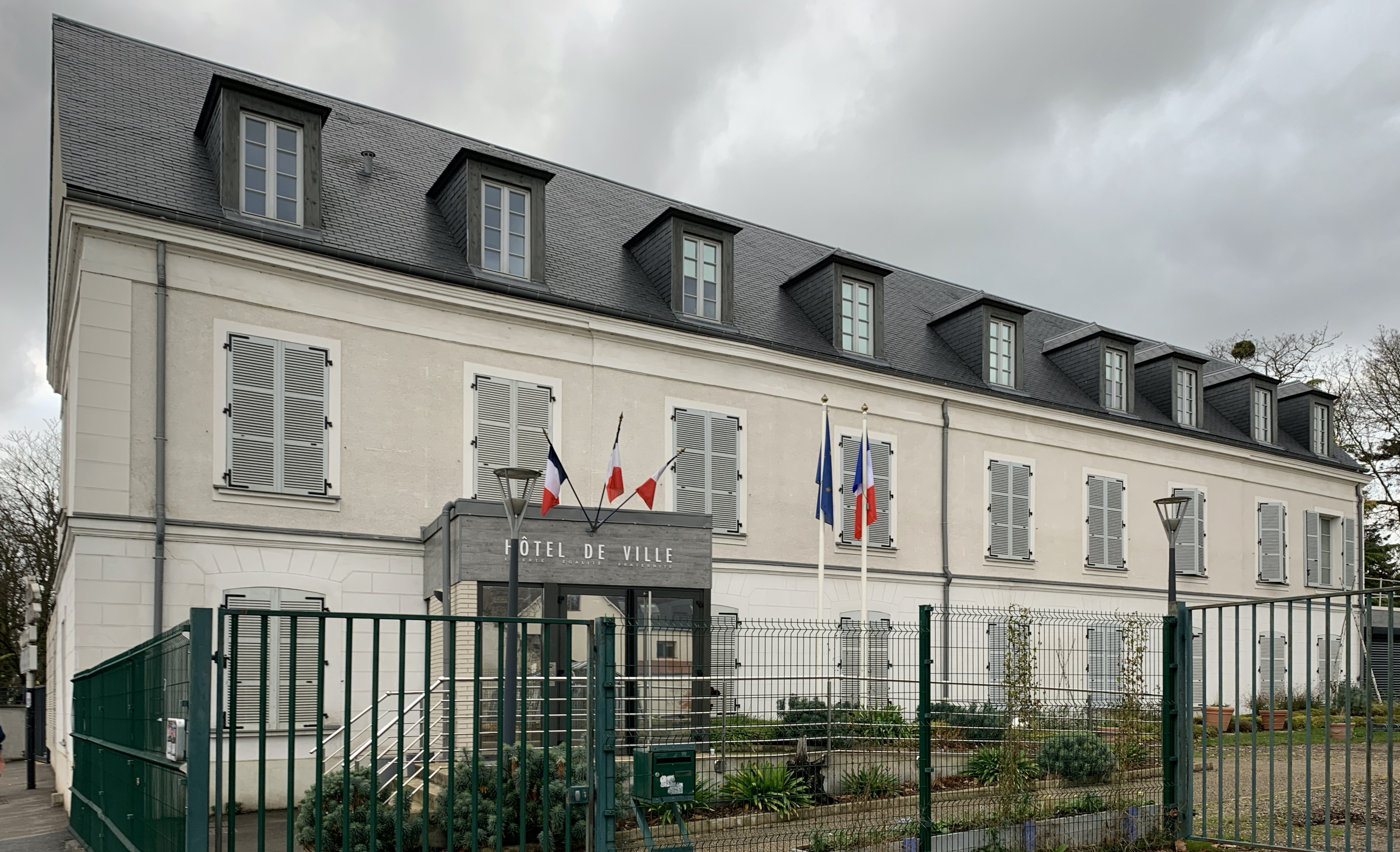
- The main frontage of the Hôtel de Ville in December 2019
- Interactive map of the Hôtel de Ville area

General information
- Type: City hall
- Architectural style: Modern style
- Location: Sevran, France
- Coordinates: 48.9395°N 2.5258°E
- Completed: 2015

The Hôtel de Ville (French pronunciation: [otɛl də vil], City Hall) is a municipal building in Sevran, Seine-Saint-Denis, in the northeastern suburbs of Paris, standing on Avenue du Général Leclerc.

== History ==
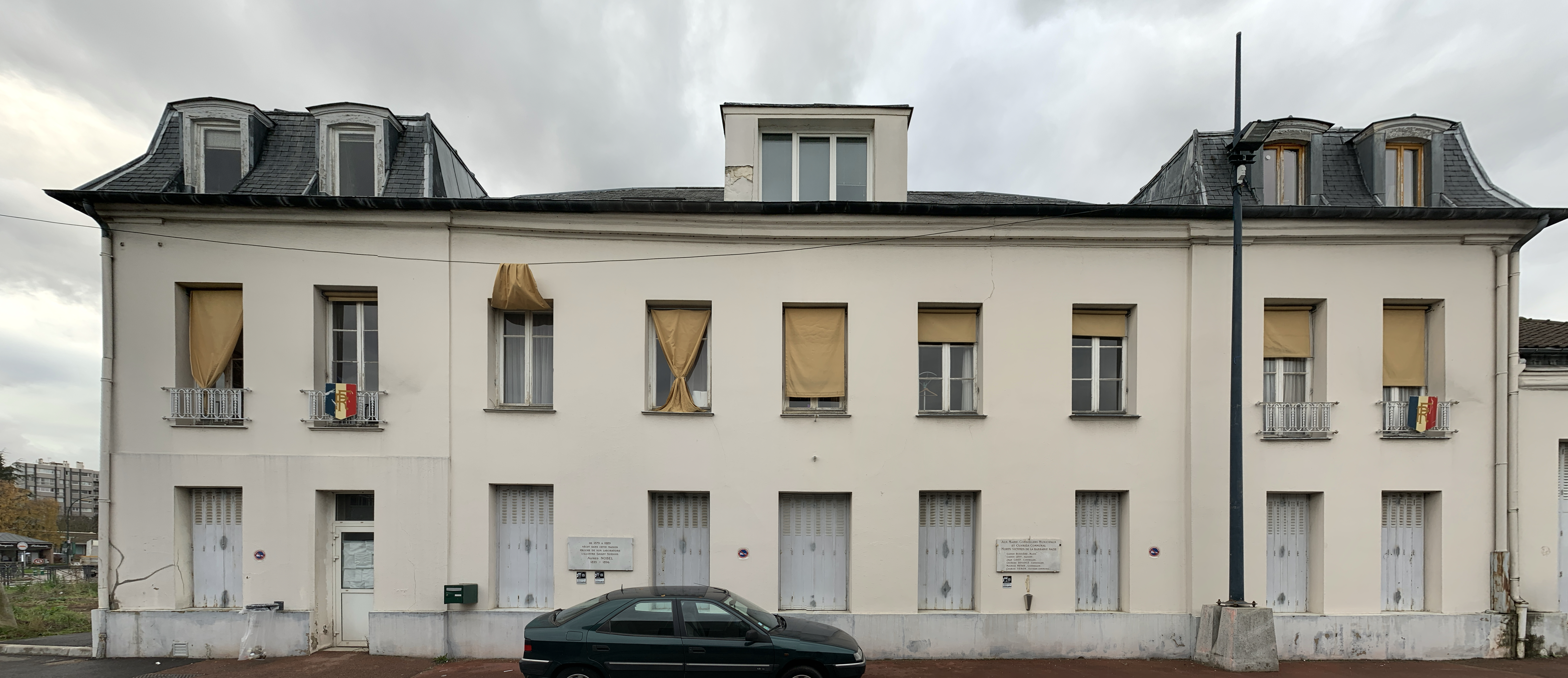
The first town hall, known as "Le Fayet"

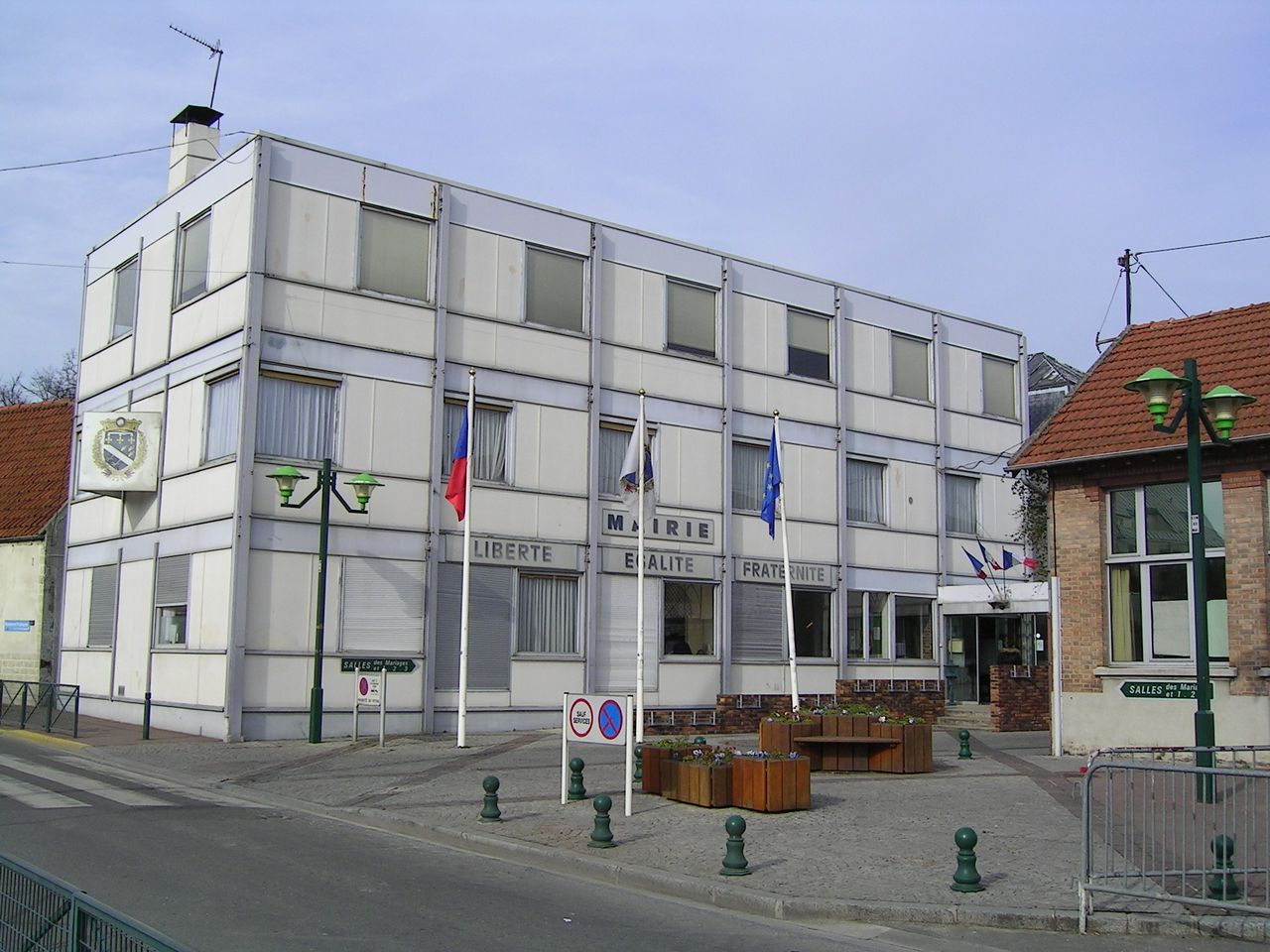
The former annex to the town hall

After the French Revolution, meetings of the town council were initially held in the house of the mayor at the time. In the late 19th century, the council decided to establish a dedicated town hall. The building they selected was a large house on Rue Roger-Le-Maner known as "Le Fayet". It was designed in the neoclassical style, built in brick with a stucco finish and was completed in the 18th century.

The design involved a symmetrical main frontage of nine bays facing onto Rue Roger-Le-Maner, with the last two bays at each end slightly projected forward as pavilions. The First Consul of the French Republic, Napoleon, visited the house during a review of the construction of the Ourcq Canal on 27 February 1803. In 1881, it was acquired by the Swedish chemist, Alfred Nobel, who used it as a laboratory. The property was managed by his assistant, Georges Fehrenbach, and the experiments related to the development of the explosive, ballistite. The French Army showed no interest in the product and the rights were sold to the Italian Government in 1889. Nobel moved out later that year and the town council acquired the building in around 1892.

During the Paris insurrection of 19 August 1944, part the Second World War, a group of residents seized the town hall on 27 August 1944. German troops temporarily regained control and their presence was not eliminated until 29 August 1944.

Following significant population growth, the town council commissioned an annex to the town hall. The site selected for the annex was to the southwest of the main building. It was a prefabricated building, built in plasterboard and completed around 1975. With the consent of the council, the building was used as a canvas by local graffiti artists, allowing them to demonstrate their artistic skills, in November 2011. By that time, the annexe was considered too small and the council decided it should be demolished.

The property the council selected for the new town hall was the main building at Fief de la Fossée, a feudal estate owned by the local seigneur since the 16th century. It was owned by the Therresse family 1674 to 1786 and, after being badly damaged in the Franco-Prussian War of 1870, it was held by the Hamelin family and their heirs from 1900 to 1930. It then served as a hospital for former police officers, operated by the Daughters of Charity of Saint Vincent de Paul from 1930 to 1974. The town council acquired the estate in 1974 and converted the main building into a music conservatory. The main building was badly damaged in the 2005 French riots, but was fully restored for municipal use in 2015. The design involved a main frontage of nine bays with its south end facing onto Avenue du Général Leclerc. A porch was erected in front of the second bay on the left.
