= Villetaneuse =

- Commune
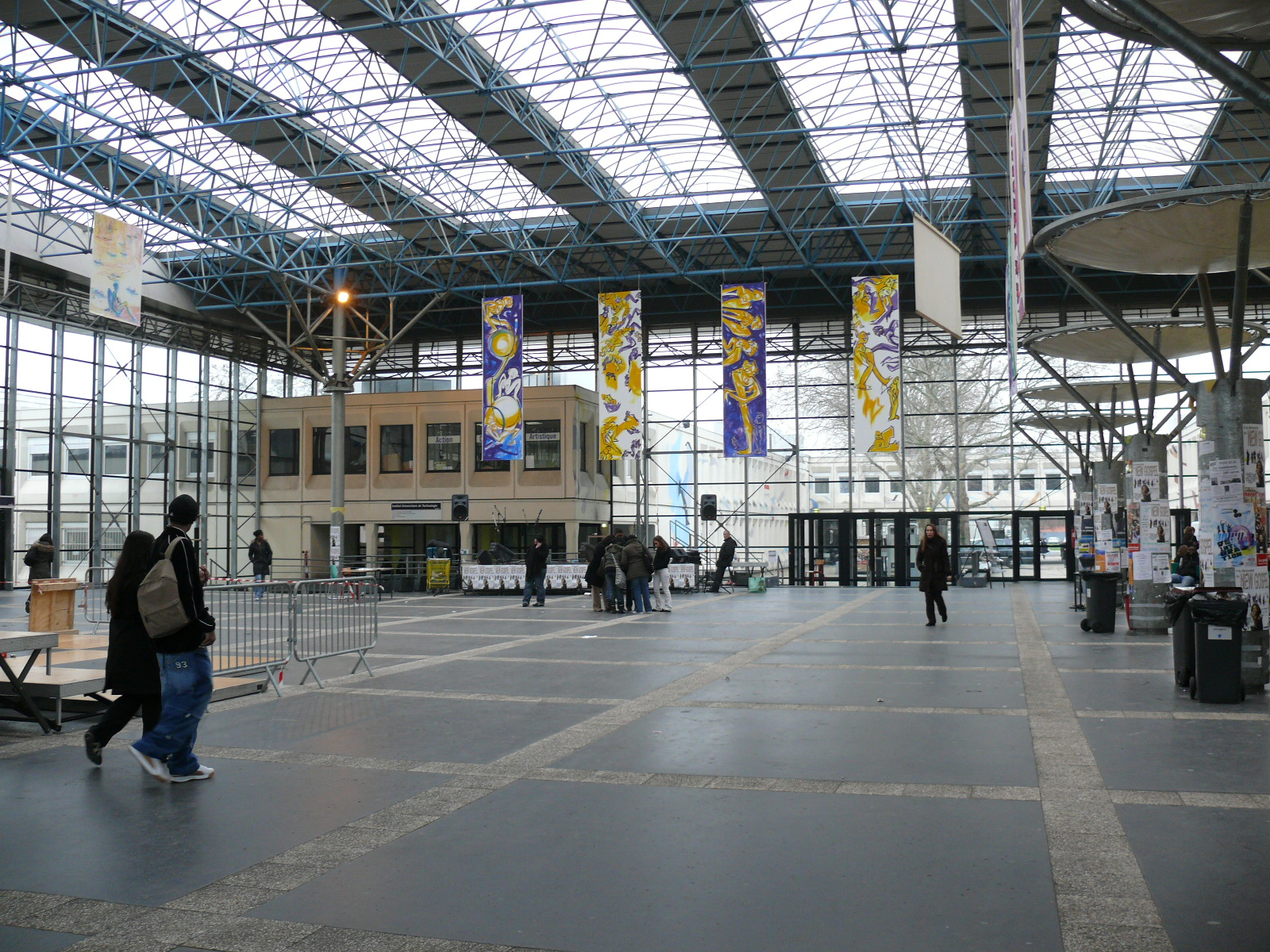
- The entrance hall to the Paris XIII University in Villetaneuse

- Coat of arms

- Location (in red) within Paris inner suburbs
- Location of Villetaneuse
- Location within France Location within Île-de-France (region)
- Coordinates: 48°57′55″N 2°20′42″E
- Country: France
- Region: Île-de-France
- Department: Seine-Saint-Denis
- Arrondissement: Saint-Denis
- Canton: Épinay-sur-Seine
- Intercommunality: Grand Paris

Government
  - Mayor (2026–32): Dieunor Excellent
- Area^{1}: 2.31 km^{2} (0.89 sq mi)
- Population (2023): 12,530
  - Density: 5,420/km^{2} (14,000/sq mi)
- Time zone: UTC+01:00 (CET)
  - Summer (DST): UTC+02:00 (CEST)
- INSEE/Postal code: 93079 /
- ^{1} French Land Register data, which excludes lakes, ponds, glaciers > 1 km^{2} (0.386 sq mi or 247 acres) and river estuaries.

Villetaneuse (French pronunciation: [viltanøz]) is a commune in the Seine-Saint-Denis department, in the northern suburbs of Paris, France. It is located 12.1 km (7.5 mi) from the center of Paris.

== Heraldry ==
The arms of Villetaneuse are blazoned : Gules, a castle argent open and pierced of the field, on a chief argent 3 trees vert.

== Population ==
Historical population
Year	Pop.	±% p.a.
1968	7,405	—
1975	8,909	+2.68%
1982	10,080	+1.78%
1990	11,177	+1.30%
1999	11,376	+0.20%
2007	12,378	+1.06%
2012	12,502	+0.20%
2017	13,646	+1.77%
2023	12,530	−1.41%
Source: INSEE

== Education ==
=== Primary and secondary schools ===
The commune has four preschools (maternelles) and four primary schools, with 150 employees total. They are:

- Preschools: Anne Frank, Jacqueline Quatremaire, Jules Verne, Henri Wallon
- Elementary schools: Jean-Baptiste Clément, Paul Langevin, Jules Vallès, Jules Verne

Two junior high schools (collèges), operated by Seine-Saint-Denis, are in the commune: Lucie Aubrac and Jean Vilar. Students in Villetaneuse attend senior high schools/sixth-form colleges (lycées), operated by Île-de-France, in various surrounding municipalities.

=== University ===
Villetaneuse is well known for its university named "Université Paris XIII or Paris Nord", in particular: the Polytechnique Science Institut "Institut Galilée" where Material Science, Computer Science, Mathematics, Physics, Electronics, Chemical Engineering, and Chemistry are taught.

== Transport ==
Villetaneuse is served by no station of the Paris Métro, RER, or suburban rail network. The closest station to Villetaneuse is Épinay – Villetaneuse station on the Transilien Paris – Nord suburban rail line. This station is located in the neighboring commune of Épinay-sur-Seine, 1.2 km (0.75 mi) from the town center of Villetaneuse. It takes less than 15 min to commute to Paris by train. Charles de Gaulle International Airport is located about 12 km (7.5 mi) away from Villetaneuse.

== See also ==
- Communes of the Seine-Saint-Denis department
