= Vaujours =

- Commune
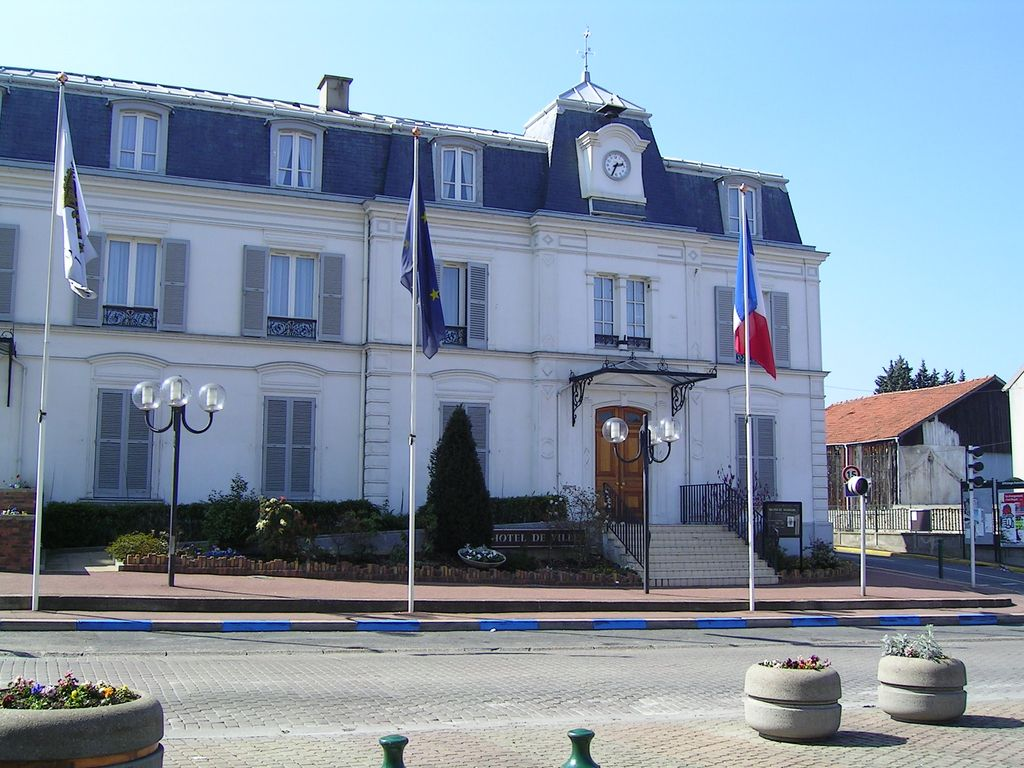
- Vaujours town hall

- Coat of arms

- Location (in red) within Paris inner suburbs
- Location of Vaujours
- Location within France Location within Île-de-France (region)
- Coordinates: 48°56′00″N 2°34′00″E
- Country: France
- Region: Île-de-France
- Department: Seine-Saint-Denis
- Arrondissement: Le Raincy
- Canton: Tremblay-en-France
- Intercommunality: Grand Paris

Government
  - Mayor (2026–32): Inès Merbah
- Area^{1}: 3.78 km^{2} (1.46 sq mi)
- Population (2023): 8,007
  - Density: 2,120/km^{2} (5,490/sq mi)
- Time zone: UTC+01:00 (CET)
  - Summer (DST): UTC+02:00 (CEST)
- INSEE/Postal code: 93074 /93410
- ^{1} French Land Register data, which excludes lakes, ponds, glaciers > 1 km^{2} (0.386 sq mi or 247 acres) and river estuaries.

Vaujours (French pronunciation: [voʒuʁ]) is a commune in the northeastern suburbs of Paris, France. It is located 18.2 km (11.3 mi) from the center of Paris, in the département of Seine-Saint-Denis. Known for its wines and fruit until the end of the 19th century, Vaujours is now one of the world's premier producers of plaster of Paris.

== History and Heritage ==
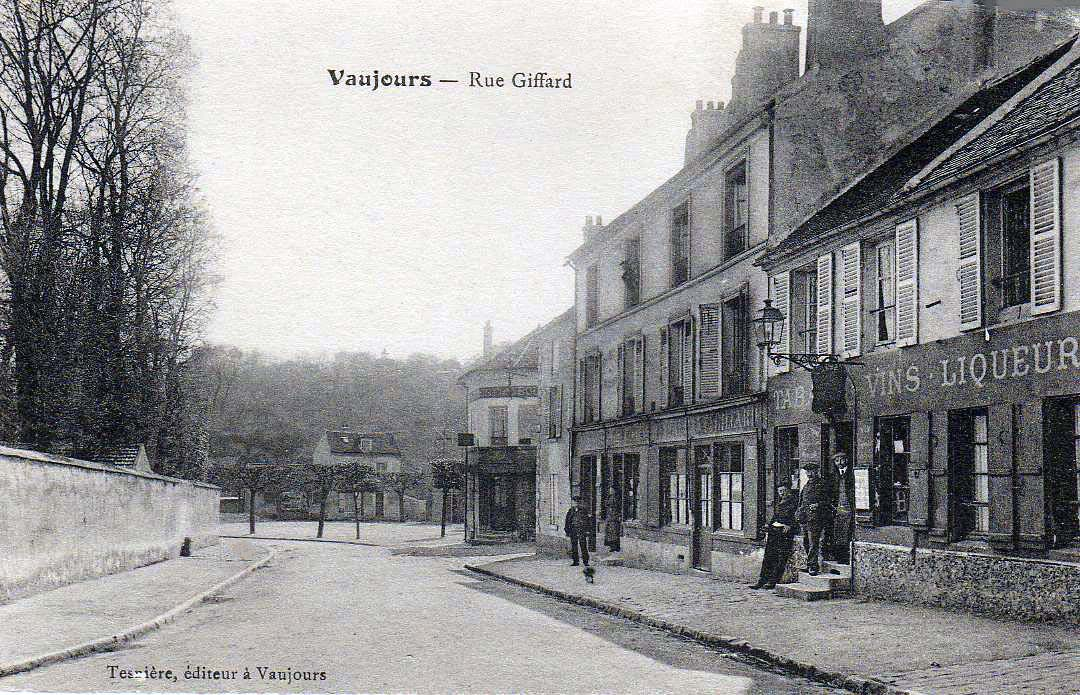
Rue Giffard around 1900

The commune is mentioned in documents predating the 9th century. In archives from the twelfth century, it is named as Vallis Jost and Vaujoi, from the Latin for 'valley of joy'. Around the year 1100, the land belonged to Étienne de Senlis, archdeacon of Notre Dame de Paris who gave it in turn as one of many generous gifts of the time to the Abbey of St Victor, Paris. Henry VI of England and (for a time) of France had a hunting lodge near Montauban Hill, where now there is a housing development which bears his name.

At the end of the 18th century Saint Nicholas Church was constructed. This building still houses the treasures of sacred art, in particular an 18th-century painting representing the baptism of Christ, and a tabernacle from the seventeenth century. Until the start of the 20th century the village of Vaujours was largely controlled by the Pailleux family. The funerary flagstones of the family of the Master who ruled the village from 1760 to 1840 can also be seen in the church.

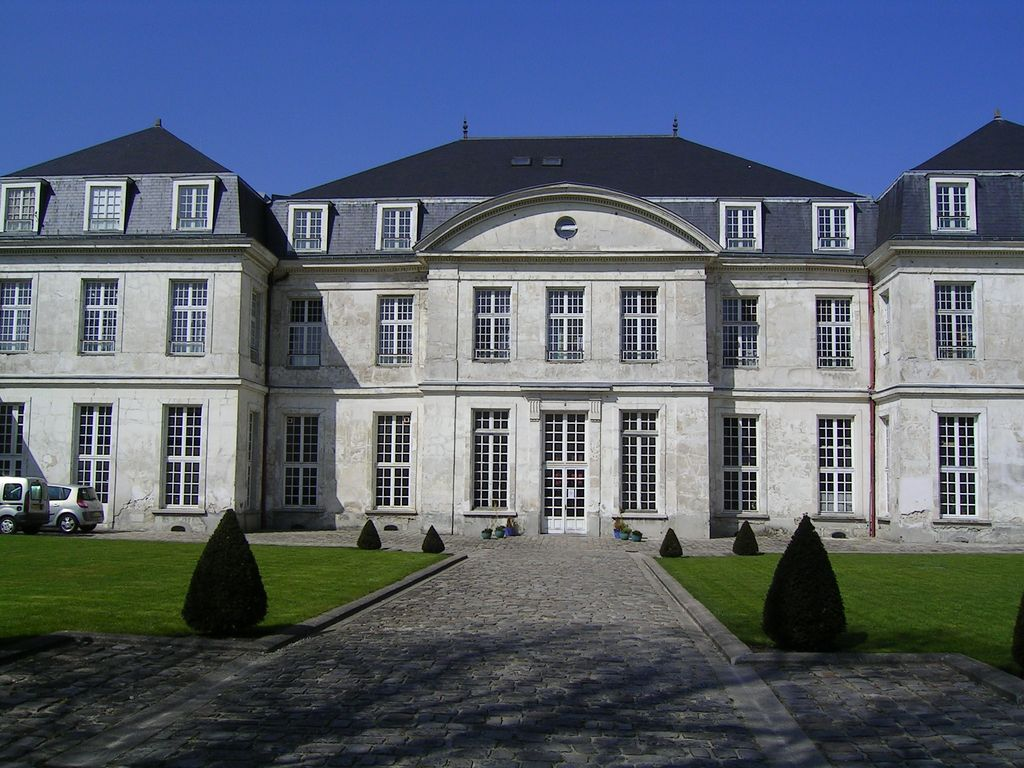
École Fénelon

In 1844, the 18th-century mansion known as château de Vaujours was converted into Fénelon Horticultural School. Named after the celebrated French writer François Fénelon, this restored some of the former prestige of the mansion. The mansion's wrought ironwork, sculptures and paintings are registered historic monuments and beside the building is a tithe barn dating from the 17th or 18th century.

Vaujours was also a strategic point during the First Battle of the Marne in September 1914, one of the most important battles of the First World War.

== Population ==
Historical population
Year	Pop.	±% p.a.
1968	4,748	—
1975	4,726	−0.07%
1982	4,885	+0.47%
1990	5,214	+0.82%
1999	5,570	+0.74%
2007	6,047	+1.03%
2012	6,834	+2.48%
2017	7,030	+0.57%
2023	8,007	+2.19%
Source: INSEE

== Heraldry ==
Arms of Vaujours	The arms of Vaujours are blazoned: Azure, a bend embattled-counterembattled Or, on a chief azure an escarbuncle fleury Or.

== Transport ==
Although Vaujours does not have its own station on the Parisian rail network, it is served by Vert-Galant station on Paris RER line B. This station is located in the neighbouring commune of Villepinte, 1.4 km (0.87 mi) from the centre of Vaujours.

== Education ==
Schools in the commune:

- Two public preschools/nursery schools (maternelles): La Fontaine and Les Marlières
- Two public elementary schools: Paul Bert and Jules Ferry
- One public junior high school: Henri IV
- A private school from elementary to senior high: Fénelon - Vaujours

== Twin towns ==
- Court-Saint-Étienne, Belgium
- Tamworth, England

== See also ==
- Communes of the Seine-Saint-Denis department
