= Canton of Épinay-sur-Seine =

Coordinates: 48.95°N 2.33°E

The canton of Épinay-sur-Seine is an administrative division of the Seine-Saint-Denis department, Île-de-France region, northern France. Its borders were modified at the French canton reorganisation which came into effect in March 2015. Its seat is in Épinay-sur-Seine.

It consists of the following communes:

1. Épinay-sur-Seine (partly)
2. Saint-Denis (partly)
3. Villetaneuse
