= Le Pré-Saint-Gervais =

Le Pré Saint-Gervais
- Commune
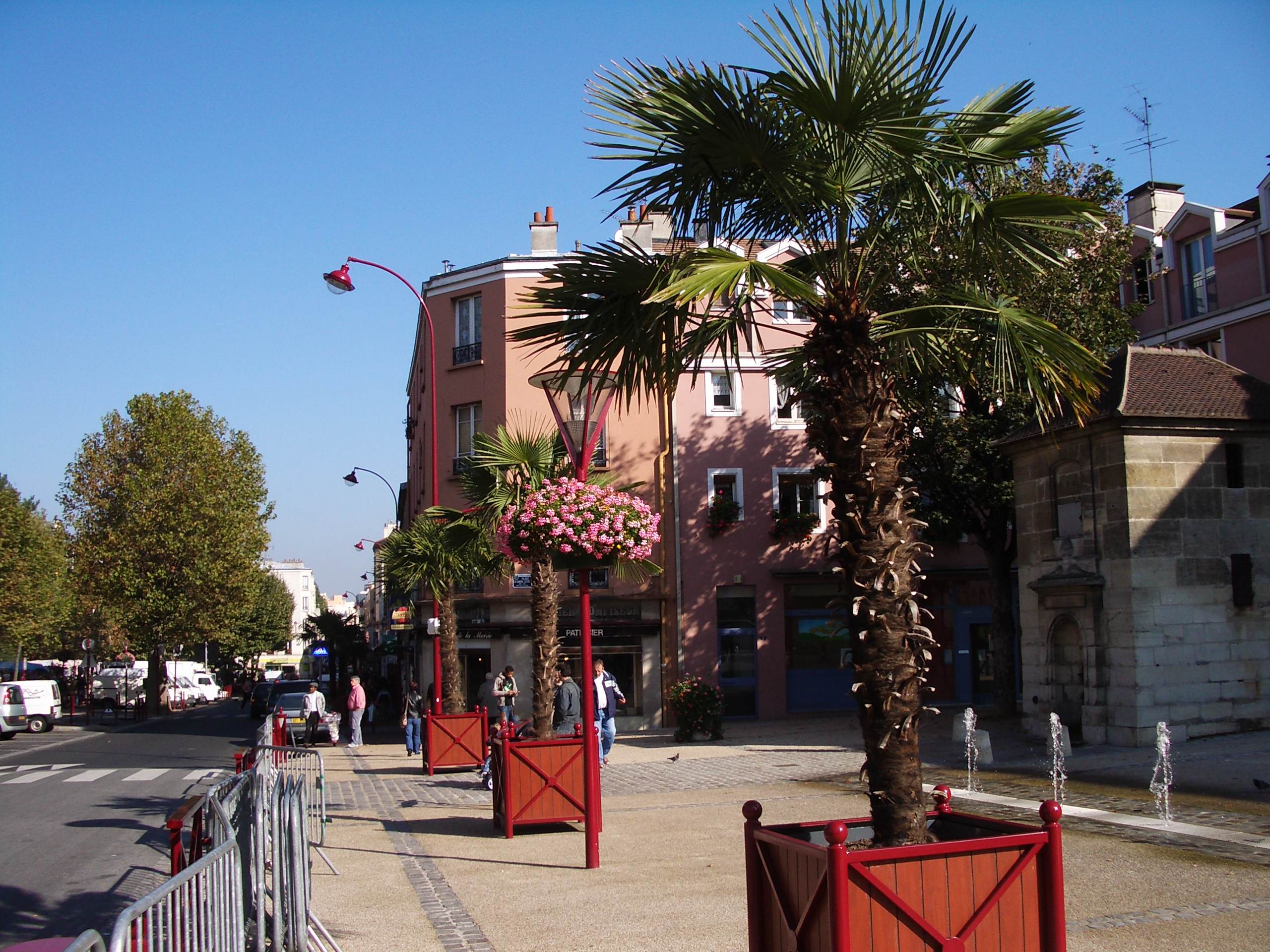
- Rue André Joineau, in Pré Saint-Gervais

- Coat of arms

- Location (in red) within Paris inner suburbs
- Location of Le Pré Saint-Gervais
- Location within France Location within Île-de-France (region)
- Coordinates: 48°53′00″N 2°24′00″E
- Country: France
- Region: Île-de-France
- Department: Seine-Saint-Denis
- Arrondissement: Bobigny
- Canton: Pantin
- Intercommunality: Grand Paris

Government
  - Mayor (2026–32): Laurent Baron
- Area^{1}: 0.70 km^{2} (0.27 sq mi)
- Population (2023): 16,993
  - Density: 24,000/km^{2} (63,000/sq mi)
- Time zone: UTC+01:00 (CET)
  - Summer (DST): UTC+02:00 (CEST)
- INSEE/Postal code: 93061 /93310
- ^{1} French Land Register data, which excludes lakes, ponds, glaciers > 1 km^{2} (0.386 sq mi or 247 acres) and river estuaries.

Le Pré-Saint-Gervais (French pronunciation: [lə pʁe sɛ̃ ʒɛʁvɛ]; simply known by locals as Le Pré, 'the meadow') is a commune in the northeastern suburbs of Paris, France. It is located 5.2 km (3.2 mi) from the center of Paris. With a density of about 24,000 inhabitants per square kilometres, Le Pré-Saint-Gervais is one of the most densely populated municipalities in Europe.

== History ==
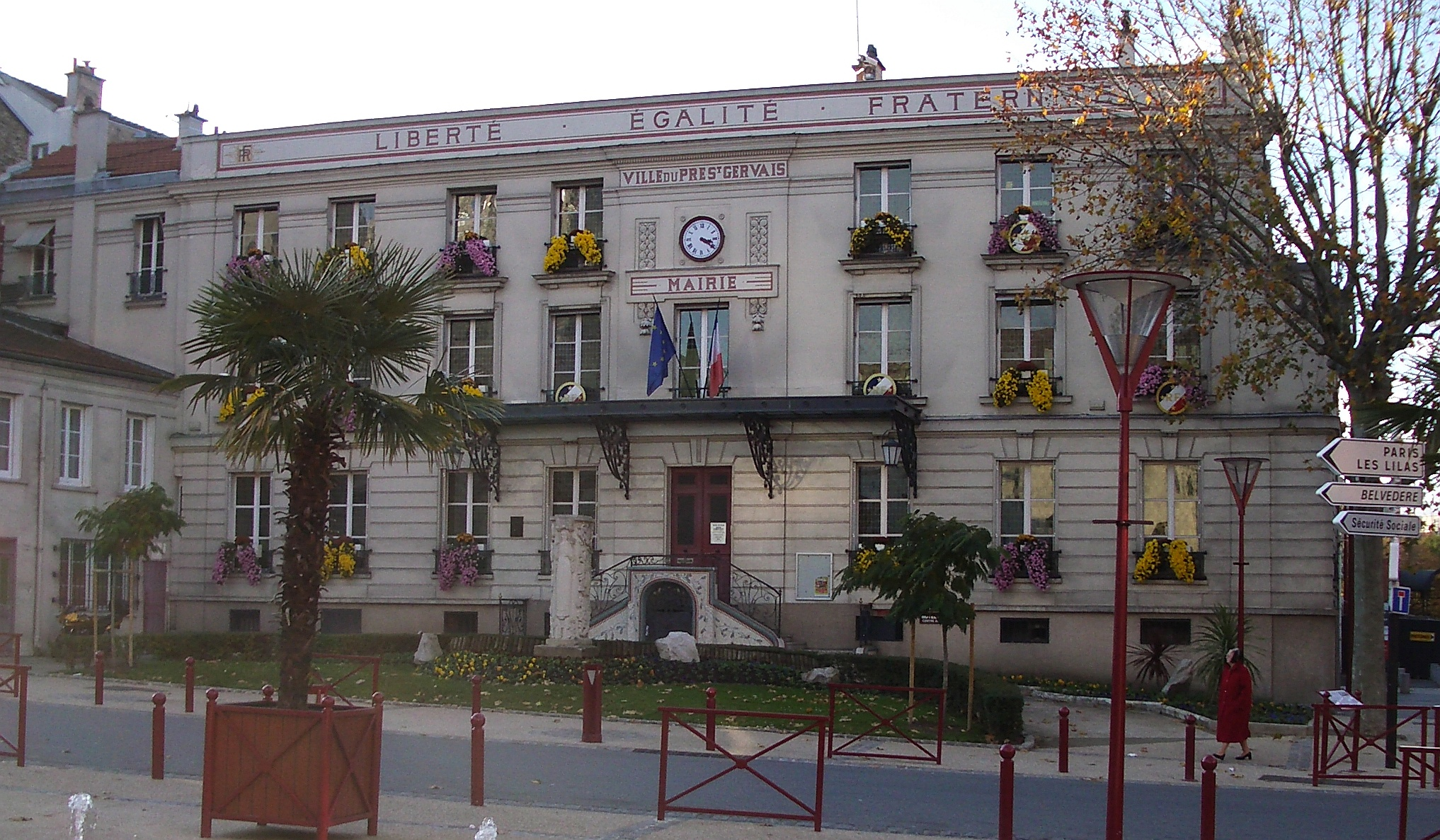
Town hall of Pré-Saint-Gervais

In 1767, Johann Schobert, a German composer at the Palace of Versailles went mushroom picking with his family in Le Pré-Saint-Gervais, and died after insisting on eating them in a soup after two chefs told him that they were poisonous.

On 1 January 1860, the city of Paris was enlarged by annexing neighboring communes. On that occasion, a large part of the commune of Le Pré-Saint-Gervais was annexed to Paris, and forms now the neighborhood of Pré-Saint-Gervais, in the 19th arrondissement of Paris, leaving Le Pré-Saint-Gervais as a rump commune.

=== Heraldry ===
Arms of Le Pré-Saint-Gervais	The arms of Le Pré-Saint-Gervais are blazoned : Vert, 5 barrulets wavy in base and a ram's head argent, horned Or.

== Population ==
Historical population
Year	Pop.	±% p.a.
1968	14,772	—
1975	13,271	−1.52%
1982	13,078	−0.21%
1990	15,373	+2.04%
1999	16,377	+0.71%
2007	17,244	+0.65%
2012	18,025	+0.89%
2017	17,950	−0.08%
2023	16,993	−0.91%
Source: INSEE

== Transport ==
No station of the Paris Métro, RER, or suburban rail network is in Le Pré-Saint-Gervais. The closest Métro stations are Hoche on Line to the north, and Pré-Saint-Gervais on Line to the southwest, each a few hundred metres outside the commune.

== Education ==
Schools in the commune:

- Public preschools (maternelles): École Baudin, École Rosa-Parks, École Suzanne-Lacore, École Nelson-Mandela
- Public elementaries: École Anatole-France, École Jean-Jaurès, École Pierre-Brossolette
- Public junior high school: Collège Jean-Jacques-Rousseau
- Private preschool through junior high school: École et collège Saint-Joseph
- Private preschool: École maternelle Montessori

== Personalities ==
Le Pré-Saint-Gervais is the birthplace of Louis Wagner, winner of the 1906 Vanderbilt Cup and the 1908 American Grand Prize.

== See also ==
- Communes of the Seine-Saint-Denis department
