= Sevran =

- Commune
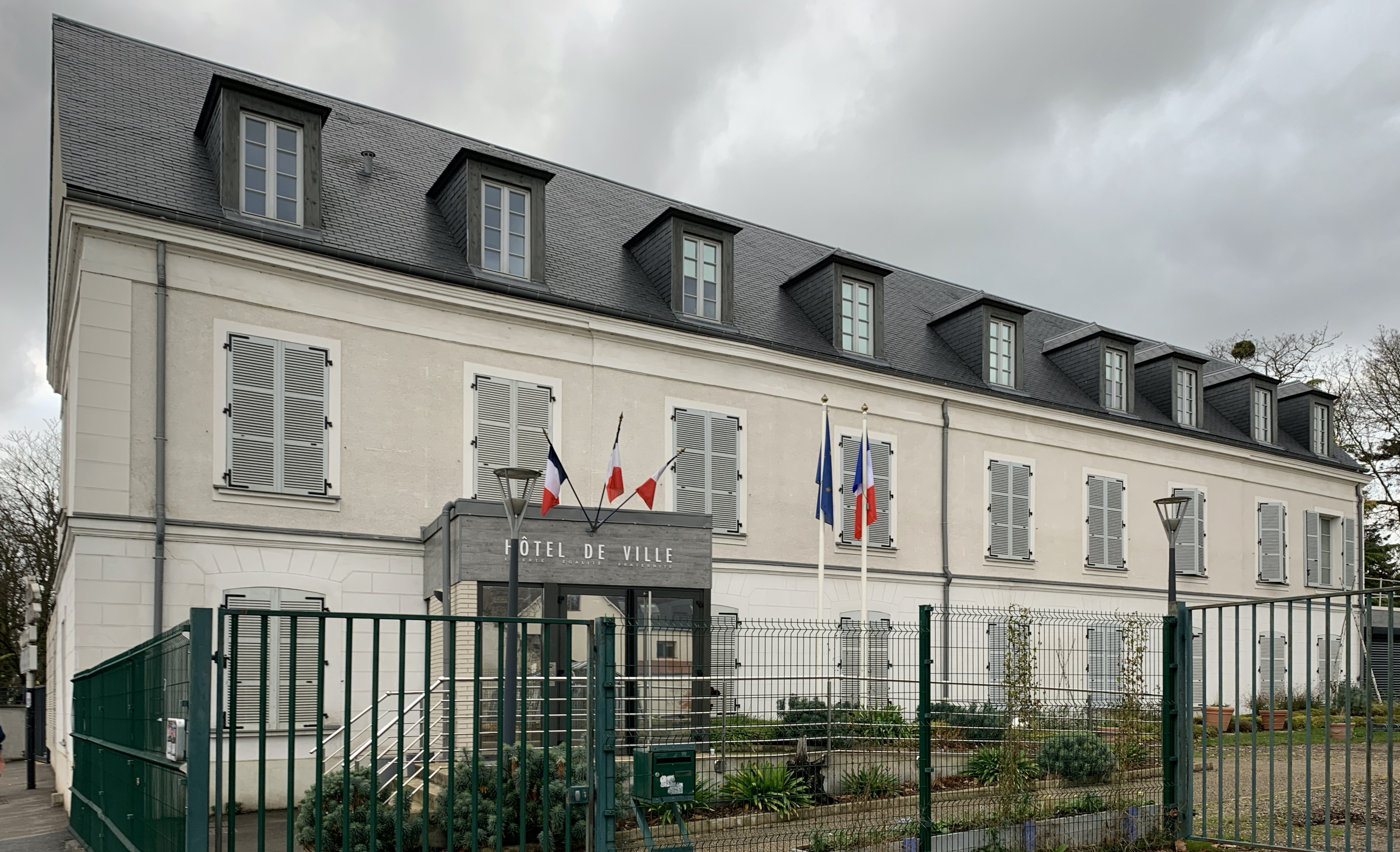
- The Hôtel de Ville in 2019

- Coat of arms

- Location (in red) within Paris inner suburbs
- Location of Sevran
- Location within France Location within Île-de-France (region)
- Coordinates: 48°56′00″N 2°32′00″E
- Country: France
- Region: Île-de-France
- Department: Seine-Saint-Denis
- Arrondissement: Le Raincy
- Canton: Sevran
- Intercommunality: Grand Paris

Government
  - Mayor (2026–32): Stéphane Blanchet
- Area^{1}: 7.28 km^{2} (2.81 sq mi)
- Elevation: 55 m (180 ft)
- Population (2023): 52,535
  - Density: 7,220/km^{2} (18,700/sq mi)
- Time zone: UTC+01:00 (CET)
  - Summer (DST): UTC+02:00 (CEST)
- INSEE/Postal code: 93071 /93270
- ^{1} French Land Register data, which excludes lakes, ponds, glaciers > 1 km^{2} (0.386 sq mi or 247 acres) and river estuaries.

Sevran (French pronunciation: [səvʁɑ̃]) is a commune in the French department of Seine-Saint-Denis, northeastern suburbs of Paris, Île-de-France. It is located 16.2 km (10.1 mi) from the center of Paris.

== History ==
The current Hôtel de Ville was completed in 2015.

== Geography ==
Sevran is located northeast of the Boulevard Périphérique.

== Demographics ==
Historical population

Year	Pop.	±% p.a.
1793	326	—
1800	301	−1.13%
1806	328	+1.44%
1821	243	−1.98%
1831	299	+2.10%
1836	318	+1.24%
1841	311	−0.44%
1846	316	+0.32%
1851	309	−0.45%
1856	318	+0.58%
1861	361	+2.57%
1866	360	−0.06%
1872	365	+0.23%
1876	518	+9.15%
1881	689	+5.87%
1886	848	+4.24%
1891	873	+0.58%
1896	1,028	+3.32%
1901	1,073	+0.86%

Year	Pop.	±% p.a.
1906	1,378	+5.13%
1911	1,923	+6.89%
1921	2,691	+3.42%
1926	6,058	+17.62%
1931	10,071	+10.70%
1936	10,147	+0.15%
1946	8,889	−1.31%
1954	12,956	+4.82%
1962	17,969	+4.17%
1968	20,253	+2.01%
1975	34,221	+7.78%
1982	41,809	+2.90%
1990	48,478	+1.87%
1999	47,063	−0.33%
2007	51,110	+1.04%
2012	49,442	−0.66%
2017	51,016	+0.63%
2023	52,535	+0.49%

Source: EHESS and INSEE (1968-2023)

=== Immigration ===
Place of birth of residents of Sevran in 1999
Born in metropolitan France	Born outside metropolitan France			
71.3%	28.7%			
71.3%	Born in overseas France	Born in foreign countries with French citizenship at birth^{1}	EU-15 immigrants^{2}	Non-EU-15 immigrants
71.3%	4.5%	2.5%	3.0%	18.7%
^{1} This group is made up largely of former French settlers, such as pieds-noirs in Northwest Africa, followed by former colonial citizens who had French citizenship at birth (such as was often the case for the native elite in French colonies), as well as to a lesser extent foreign-born children of French expatriates. A foreign country is understood as a country not part of France in 1999, so a person born for example in 1950 in Algeria, when Algeria was an integral part of France, is nonetheless listed as a person born in a foreign country in French statistics.^{2} An immigrant is a person born in a foreign country not having French citizenship at birth. An immigrant may have acquired French citizenship since moving to France, but is still considered an immigrant in French statistics. On the other hand, persons born in France with foreign citizenship (the children of immigrants) are not listed as immigrants.

As of 2013 the origins of over half of its resident are from outside France. The largest ethnic backgrounds within the foreign origins are from sub-Saharan Africa, Algeria, and Morocco.

In 2013 The Economist stated that Sevran was one of the poorest areas of the Paris Metropolitan Area. As of 2013 36% of the residents are considered to be below the poverty line. The national average is 12%. About 75% of Sevran's residents live in subsidized housing. The article also cites research that says "somebody called Mohamed, Ali or Kamel is four times more likely to be unemployed than somebody named Philippe or Alain."

== Culture ==
Sevran is home to an important music and dance school, the Espace François Mauriac, also known as the conservatoire de Sevran. Many important French and international musicians have taught there, including Claude Ballif, Allain Gaussin and Vincent Decleire. The famous French rappers Kaaris is also from Sevran, born to parents from Ivory Coast. Maes is also from Sevran, born to parents from Morocco.

Allegations surfaced in 2016 accusing some cafés and bars of refusing to service women, when 3 activists participated in a television report by journalist Caroline Sinz of France 2. In the report, the following sentence could be heard about a local café: "In this café, there is no diversity. We are in Sevran, we are not in Paris. You are in the 93 here! It's different mentalities, it's like back home." According to one of the activists, authorities turn a blind eye as the men support the mayor.

However, the Bondy Blog, an online media outlet focusing on working-class districts, published an article in March 2017 questioning the France 2 report, claiming to have noted the presence of women in this café on several occasions. A journalist from France 2 working for the investigative newsmagazine Complément d'enquête, who subsequently visited this café, also noted the presence of women and later abandoned the idea of filming a report there. The owner of the café later sued France 2 journalists David Pujadas and Caroline Sinz for racially motivated libel.

== Heraldry ==
The arms of Sevran are blazoned : Azure, a bend argent between 3 acorns and 2 eagle talons Or, on a chief azure, 3 fleurs de lys Or surmounted by a label argent.

== Transport ==
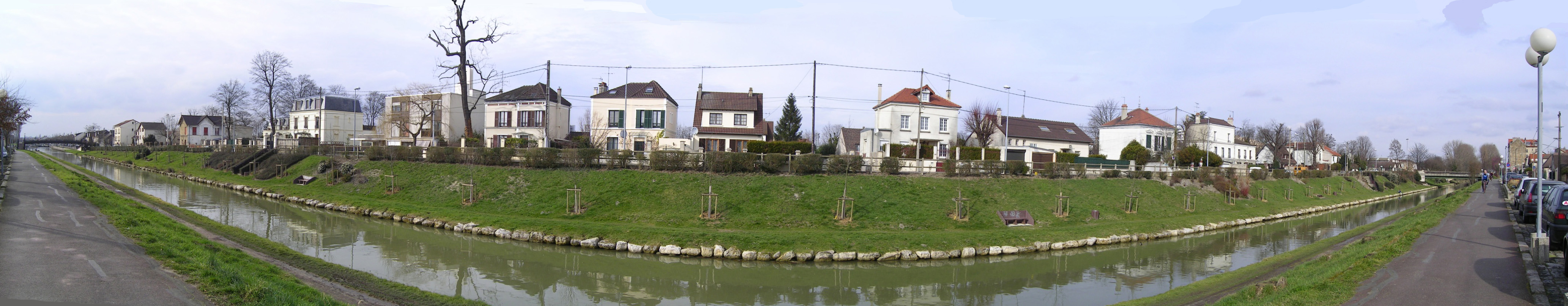
Canal de l'Ourcq

Sevran is served by two stations on Paris RER line B: Sevran – Livry and Sevran – Beaudottes.

== Education ==
Schools:

- 15 public preschools (maternelles):
- 16 public primary schools:
- 1 private preschool: École maternelle Sainte-Agnès/École élémentaire Sainte-Agnès
- Junior high schools: Collège Evariste Galois, Collège Georges Brassens, Collège Paul Painlevé, and Collège La Pléïade
- Senior high school/sixth-form college: Lycée Blaise Cendrars

== See also ==
- Communes of the Seine-Saint-Denis department
