= Canton of Pantin =

Coordinates: 48.90°N 2.41°E

The canton of Pantin is an administrative division of the Seine-Saint-Denis department, Île-de-France region, northern France. It was created at the French canton reorganisation which came into effect in March 2015. Its seat is in Pantin.

It consists of the following communes:

1. Pantin
2. Le Pré-Saint-Gervais
