= Coubron =

- Commune
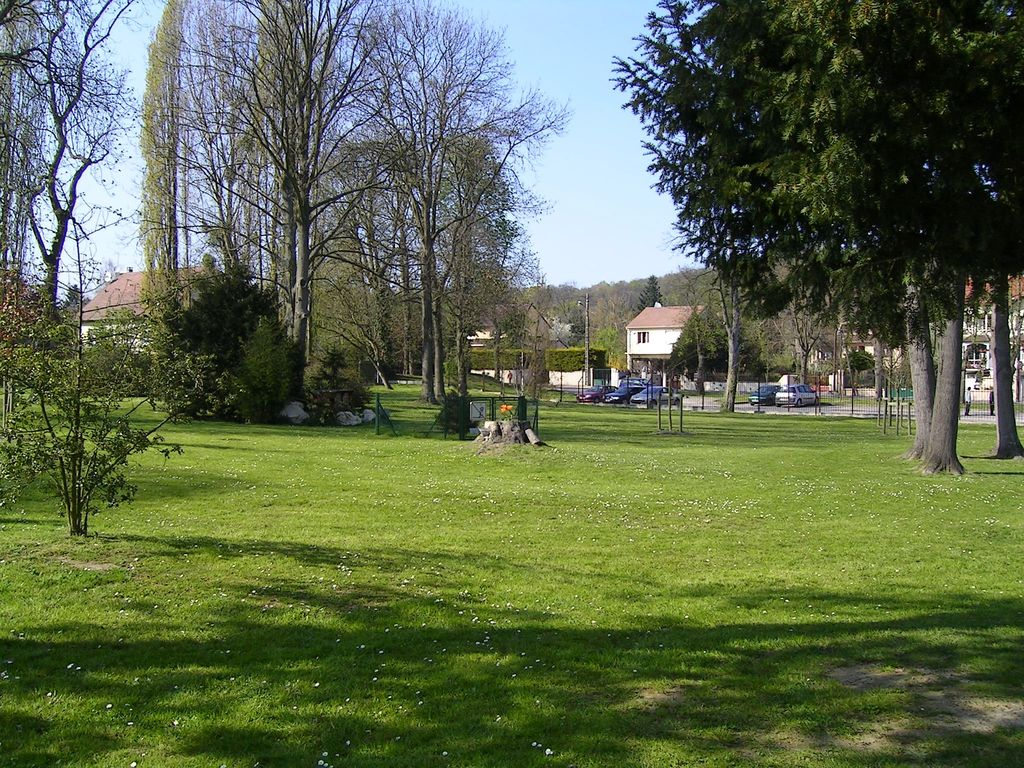
- The town hall gardens, Coubron

- Coat of arms

- Location (in red) within Paris inner suburbs
- Location of Coubron
- Location within France Location within Île-de-France (region)
- Coordinates: 48°55′00″N 2°35′00″E
- Country: France
- Region: Île-de-France
- Department: Seine-Saint-Denis
- Arrondissement: Le Raincy
- Canton: Tremblay-en-France
- Intercommunality: Grand Paris

Government
  - Mayor (2026–32): Ludovic Toro
- Area^{1}: 4.14 km^{2} (1.60 sq mi)
- Population (2023): 5,175
  - Density: 1,250/km^{2} (3,240/sq mi)
- Time zone: UTC+01:00 (CET)
  - Summer (DST): UTC+02:00 (CEST)
- INSEE/Postal code: 93015 /93470
- ^{1} French Land Register data, which excludes lakes, ponds, glaciers > 1 km^{2} (0.386 sq mi or 247 acres) and river estuaries.

Coubron (French pronunciation: [ku'bʁɔ̃]) is a commune in the Seine-Saint-Denis department, in the eastern suburbs of Paris, France. It is located 18.1 km (11.2 mi) from the centre of Paris.

== Population ==
Historical population
Year	Pop.	±% p.a.
1968	2,179	—
1975	3,385	+6.49%
1982	4,296	+3.46%
1990	4,784	+1.35%
1999	4,612	−0.41%
2007	4,646	+0.09%
2012	4,668	+0.09%
2017	4,833	+0.70%
2023	5,175	+1.15%
Source: INSEE

== Heraldry ==
Arms of Coubron	The arms of Coubron are blazoned : Or, 3 hunting horns sable stringed azure, on a chief gules 3 roses argent. (related to the arms of the Nesmond and Hocquart families.)

== Transport ==
Coubron is served by no station of the Paris Métro, RER, or suburban rail network. The closest station to Coubron is Vert-Galant station on Paris RER line B. This station is located in the commune of Villepinte, 3.2 km (2.0 mi) from the town center of Coubron.

== Education ==
There are two groups of primary schools: Paul Bert and Georges Mercier.

== See also ==
- Communes of the Seine-Saint-Denis department
