= Gournay-sur-Marne =

- Commune
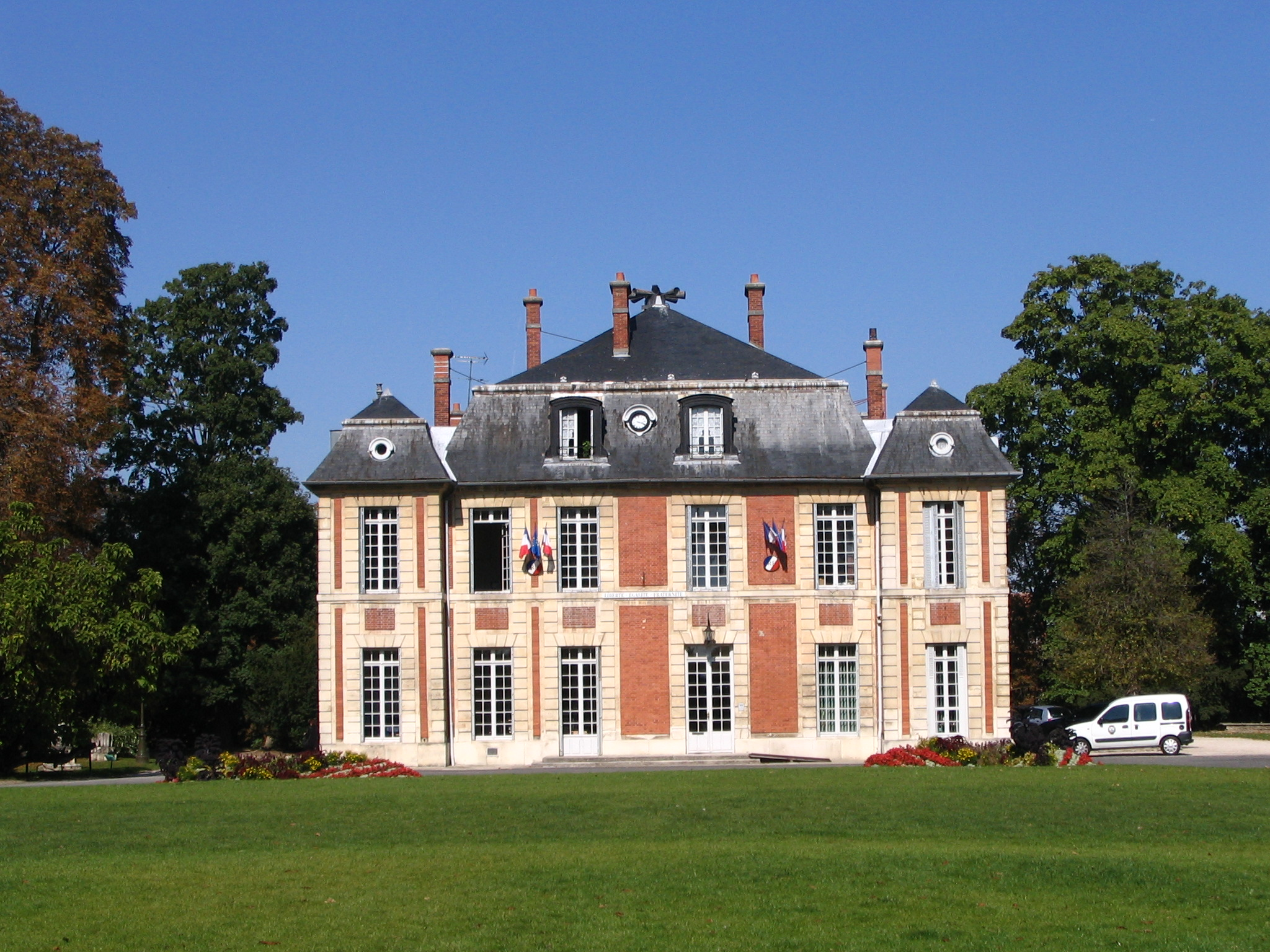
- The 17th-century Château de Gournay-sur-Marne has been the town hall since 1925 and a monument historique since 1945.

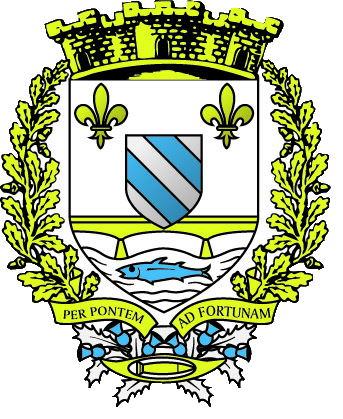
- Coat of arms

- Location (in red) within Paris inner suburbs
- Location of Gournay-sur-Marne
- Location within France Location within Île-de-France (region)
- Coordinates: 48°51′38″N 2°34′38″E
- Country: France
- Region: Île-de-France
- Department: Seine-Saint-Denis
- Arrondissement: Le Raincy
- Canton: Noisy-le-Grand
- Intercommunality: Grand Paris

Government
  - Mayor (2026–32): Nicolas Serero
- Area^{1}: 1.68 km^{2} (0.65 sq mi)
- Population (2023): 7,320
  - Density: 4,360/km^{2} (11,300/sq mi)
- Demonym: Gournaysiens
- Time zone: UTC+01:00 (CET)
  - Summer (DST): UTC+02:00 (CEST)
- INSEE/Postal code: 93033 /
- Website: www.ville-gournay-sur-marne.fr
- ^{1} French Land Register data, which excludes lakes, ponds, glaciers > 1 km^{2} (0.386 sq mi or 247 acres) and river estuaries.

Gournay-sur-Marne (French pronunciation: [ɡuʁnɛ syʁ maʁn]; lit. 'Gournay-on-Marne') or simply Gournay is a commune in the eastern outer suburbs of Paris, France. It is located 16.4 km (10.2 mi) from the centre of Paris, in Seine-Saint-Denis on the departmental border with Seine-et-Marne.

== Population ==
Historical population
Year	Pop.	±% p.a.
1968	3,922	—
1975	4,285	+1.27%
1982	4,220	−0.22%
1990	5,486	+3.33%
1999	5,925	+0.86%
2007	6,196	+0.56%
2012	6,574	+1.19%
2017	6,869	+0.88%
2023	7,320	+1.07%
Source: INSEE

== Heraldry ==
Arms of Gournay-sur-Marne	The arms of Gournay-sur-Marne are blazoned : Azure, a 3 arched bridge Or masoned sable, between 2 fleurs de lys Or and on a base engrailed (river) argent, a fish azure; overall on an inescutcheon argent, 2 bends azure.
motto: Per fontem ad fortunam (spring to fortune)

== Transport ==
Gournay-sur-Marne is served by no station of the Paris Métro, RER, or suburban rail network. The closest station to Gournay-sur-Marne is Chelles – Gournay station on Paris RER line E and on the Transilien Paris – Est suburban rail line. This station is located in the neighboring commune of Chelles, 1.3 km (0.81 mi) from the town center of Gournay-sur-Marne.

== Education ==
The commune has two schools, École maternelle du château, and École élémentaire "Les pâquerettes".

== See also ==
- Communes of the Seine-Saint-Denis department
