= Canton of Saint-Denis-1, Seine-Saint-Denis =

Coordinates: 48.92°N 2.35°E

The canton of Saint-Denis-1 is an administrative division of the Seine-Saint-Denis department, Île-de-France region, northern France. It was created at the French canton reorganisation which came into effect in March 2015. Its seat is in Saint-Denis.

It consists of the following communes:

1. Saint-Denis (partly)
