= Canton of Drancy =

Administrative division of Seine-Saint-Denis, Île-de-France, France

Coordinates: 48.92°N 2.45°E

The canton of Drancy is an administrative division of the Seine-Saint-Denis department, Île-de-France region, northern France. Its borders were modified at the French canton reorganisation which came into effect in March 2015. Its seat is in Drancy.

It consists of the following communes:

1. Drancy (partly)
