= Canton of Aulnay-sous-Bois =

Coordinates: 48.94°N 2.49°E

The canton of Aulnay-sous-Bois is an administrative division of the Seine-Saint-Denis department, Île-de-France region, northern France. It was created at the French canton reorganisation which came into effect in March 2015. Its seat is in Aulnay-sous-Bois.

It consists of the following communes:

1. Aulnay-sous-Bois
