= Le Raincy =

- Subprefecture and commune
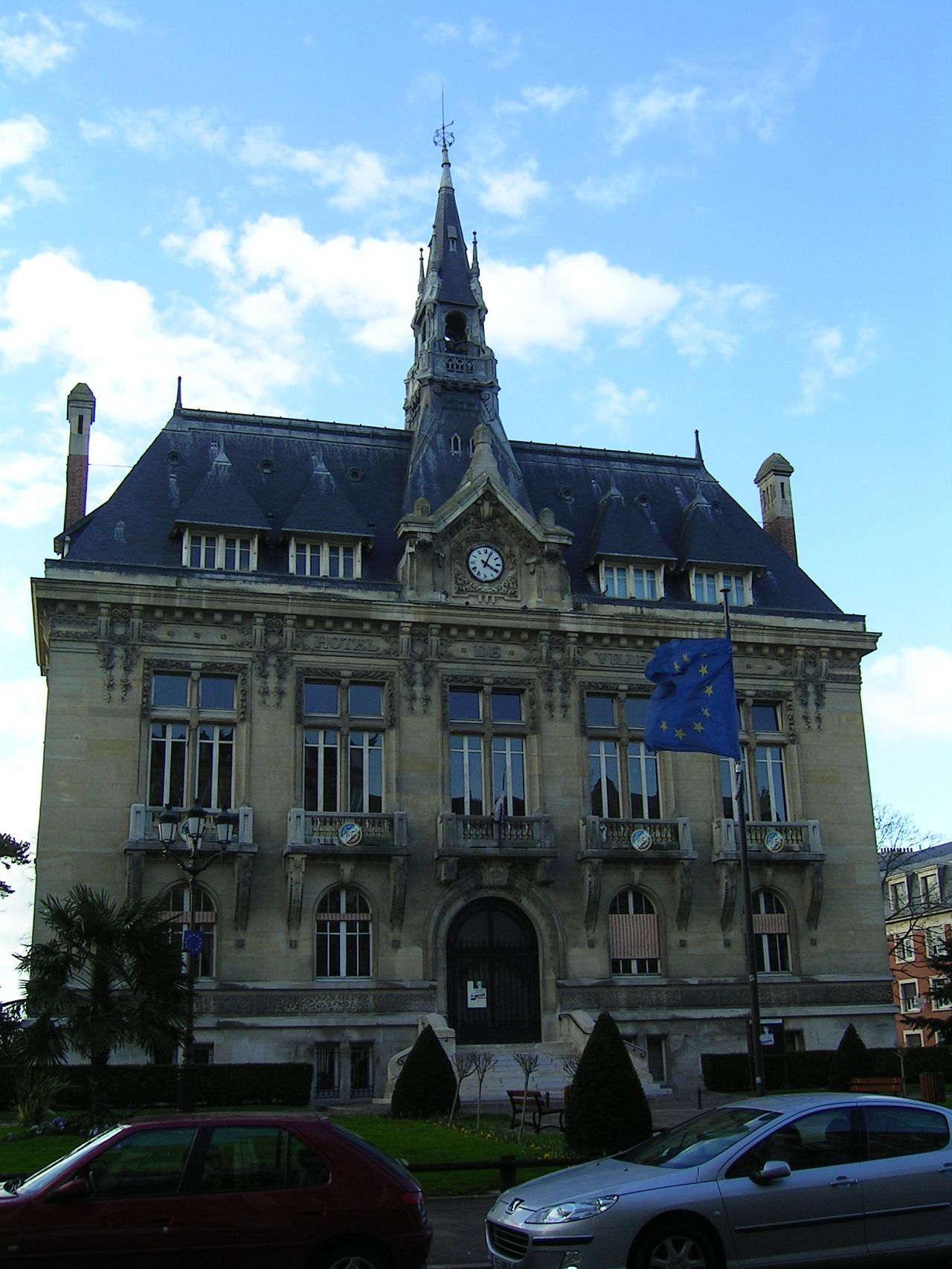
- The town hall of Le Raincy

- Coat of arms

- Location (in red) within Paris inner suburbs
- Location of Le Raincy
- Location within France Location within Île-de-France (region)
- Coordinates: 48°54′00″N 2°31′00″E
- Country: France
- Region: Île-de-France
- Department: Seine-Saint-Denis
- Arrondissement: Le Raincy
- Canton: Villemomble
- Intercommunality: Grand Paris

Government
  - Mayor (2026–32): Nicolas Rondepierre
- Area^{1}: 2.24 km^{2} (0.86 sq mi)
- Elevation: 83 m (272 ft)
- Highest elevation: 114 m (374 ft)
- Lowest elevation: 51 m (167 ft)
- Population (2023): 14,735
  - Density: 6,580/km^{2} (17,000/sq mi)
- Time zone: UTC+01:00 (CET)
  - Summer (DST): UTC+02:00 (CEST)
- INSEE/Postal code: 93062 /93340
- ^{1} French Land Register data, which excludes lakes, ponds, glaciers > 1 km^{2} (0.386 sq mi or 247 acres) and river estuaries.

Le Raincy (French pronunciation: [lə ʁɛ̃si]) is a commune in the eastern suburbs of Paris, France. It is located 13.2 km (8.2 mi) from the center of Paris. Le Raincy is a subprefecture of the Seine-Saint-Denis department and the seat of the Arrondissement of Le Raincy.

Its population is small relative to surrounding communes, just under 15,000. However, its development as an administrative centre, along with the establishment over the years of several schools, gives it more prominence than its population size would suggest.

Its character has made it known as le Neuilly de la Seine-Saint-Denis.

== Toponymy ==
The name Le Raincy derives from the Old French word rain, meaning the 'edge of a wood'. The commune is situated on the edge of the Forest of Bondy.

== History ==
In the 17th and 18th century, Raincy was known primarily as location of the Château du Raincy, now demolished. The commune of Le Raincy was created on 20 May 1869 by detaching a part of the territory of Livry-Gargan and merging it with a part of the territory of Clichy-sous-Bois and a small part of the territory of Gagny.

=== Heraldry ===
Arms of le Raincy	The arms of le Raincy are blazoned : Or, an oak tree eradicated vert, overall a fess vair, in dexter base a crescent gules in sinister base a fleur de lys azure, all within a bordure gules.
motto: "Heri Nemus Urbs Hodie" (in French: "Forêt j'étais, Ville je suis"; in English "Forest I was; City I am".

== Population ==
Historical population
Year	Pop.	±% p.a.
1968	14,224	—
1975	13,767	−0.47%
1982	13,187	−0.61%
1990	13,478	+0.27%
1999	12,961	−0.43%
2007	13,981	+0.95%
2012	13,993	+0.02%
2017	14,648	+0.92%
2023	14,735	+0.10%
Source: INSEE

== Notre-Dame du Raincy ==
The town today receives visitors - mainly to see the Notre-Dame du Raincy church. Designed by the brothers Auguste and Gustave Perret and built in 1922–1923, this was one of the first churches to be built in reinforced concrete, and with no external ornamentation. The architecture is remarkable for the classicism of its columns, greatly enhanced by the stained glass windows of Maurice Denis and Marie-Alain Couturier. The church is listed as an historic monument. It was restored in the 1990s, and is in regular use. Many of the visitors to the church come from Japan, as a smaller replica of Notre Dame du Raincy was built in the Tokyo suburbs.

== Transport ==
Le Raincy is served by Le Raincy – Villemomble – Montfermeil station on Paris RER line E.

== Education ==
Secondary schools:

- Junior high school: Collège Jean-Baptiste Corot
- Senior high schools/sixth-form colleges:
  - Lycée René Cassin
  - Lycée Albert Schweitzer

=== Notable people ===
- Manuel Ferrara, pornographic actor and director

== Twin towns ==
Le Raincy is twinned with:

- London Borough of Barnet, United Kingdom
- Clusone, Italy
- Yavne, Israel

== See also ==
- Communes of the Seine-Saint-Denis department
