= Canton of Bobigny =

Coordinates: 48.91°N 2.44°E

The canton of Bobigny is an administrative division of the Seine-Saint-Denis department, Île-de-France region, northern France. Its borders were modified at the French canton reorganisation which came into effect in March 2015. Its seat is in Bobigny.

It consists of the following communes:

1. Bobigny (partly)
2. Noisy-le-Sec
