= Canton of Le Blanc-Mesnil =

Coordinates: 48.94°N 2.46°E

The canton of Le Blanc-Mesnil is an administrative division of the Seine-Saint-Denis department, Île-de-France region, northern France. Its borders were modified at the French canton reorganisation which came into effect in March 2015. Its seat is in Le Blanc-Mesnil.

It consists of the following communes:

1. Le Blanc-Mesnil
2. Drancy (partly)
