= Communes of the Seine-Saint-Denis department =

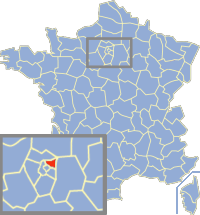

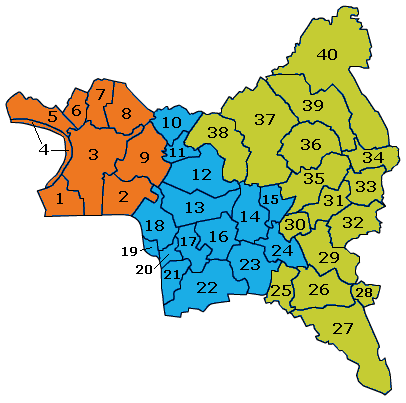

The following is a list of the 39 communes of the Seine-Saint-Denis department of France.

Since January 2016, all communes of Seine-Saint-Denis are part of the intercommunality Métropole du Grand Paris

| INSEE code | Postal code | Commune |
|---|---|---|
| 93001 | 93300 | Aubervilliers |
| 93005 | 93600 | Aulnay-sous-Bois |
| 93006 | 93170 | Bagnolet |
| 93007 | 93150 | Le Blanc-Mesnil |
| 93008 | 93000 | Bobigny |
| 93010 | 93140 | Bondy |
| 93013 | 93350 | Le Bourget |
| 93014 | 93390 | Clichy-sous-Bois |
| 93015 | 93470 | Coubron |
| 93027 | 93120 | La Courneuve |
| 93029 | 93700 | Drancy |
| 93030 | 93440 | Dugny |
| 93031 | 93800 | Épinay-sur-Seine |
| 93032 | 93220 | Gagny |
| 93033 | 93460 | Gournay-sur-Marne |
| 93039 | 93450 | L'Île-Saint-Denis |
| 93045 | 93260 | Les Lilas |
| 93046 | 93190 | Livry-Gargan |
| 93047 | 93370 | Montfermeil |
| 93048 | 93100 | Montreuil |
| 93049 | 93360 | Neuilly-Plaisance |
| 93050 | 93330 | Neuilly-sur-Marne |
| 93051 | 93160 | Noisy-le-Grand |
| 93053 | 93130 | Noisy-le-Sec |
| 93055 | 93500 | Pantin |
| 93057 | 93320 | Les Pavillons-sous-Bois |
| 93061 | 93310 | Le Pré-Saint-Gervais |
| 93062 | 93340 | Le Raincy |
| 93063 | 93230 | Romainville |
| 93064 | 93110 | Rosny-sous-Bois |
| 93066 | 93200 | Saint-Denis |
| 93070 | 93400 | Saint-Ouen |
| 93071 | 93270 | Sevran |
| 93072 | 93240 | Stains |
| 93073 | 93290 | Tremblay-en-France |
| 93074 | 93410 | Vaujours |
| 93077 | 93250 | Villemomble |
| 93078 | 93420 | Villepinte |
| 93079 | 93430 | Villetaneuse |
