= Canton of Noisy-le-Grand =

Coordinates: 48.85°N 2.55°E

The canton of Noisy-le-Grand is an administrative division of the Seine-Saint-Denis department, Île-de-France region, northern France. Its borders were not modified at the French canton reorganisation which came into effect in March 2015. Its seat is in Noisy-le-Grand.

It consists of the following communes:

1. Gournay-sur-Marne
2. Noisy-le-Grand
