= Grand Paris =

Métropole covering Paris and its nearest surrounding suburbs

Coordinates: 48.8600°N 2.3444°E

Métropole du Grand Paris
- Métropole
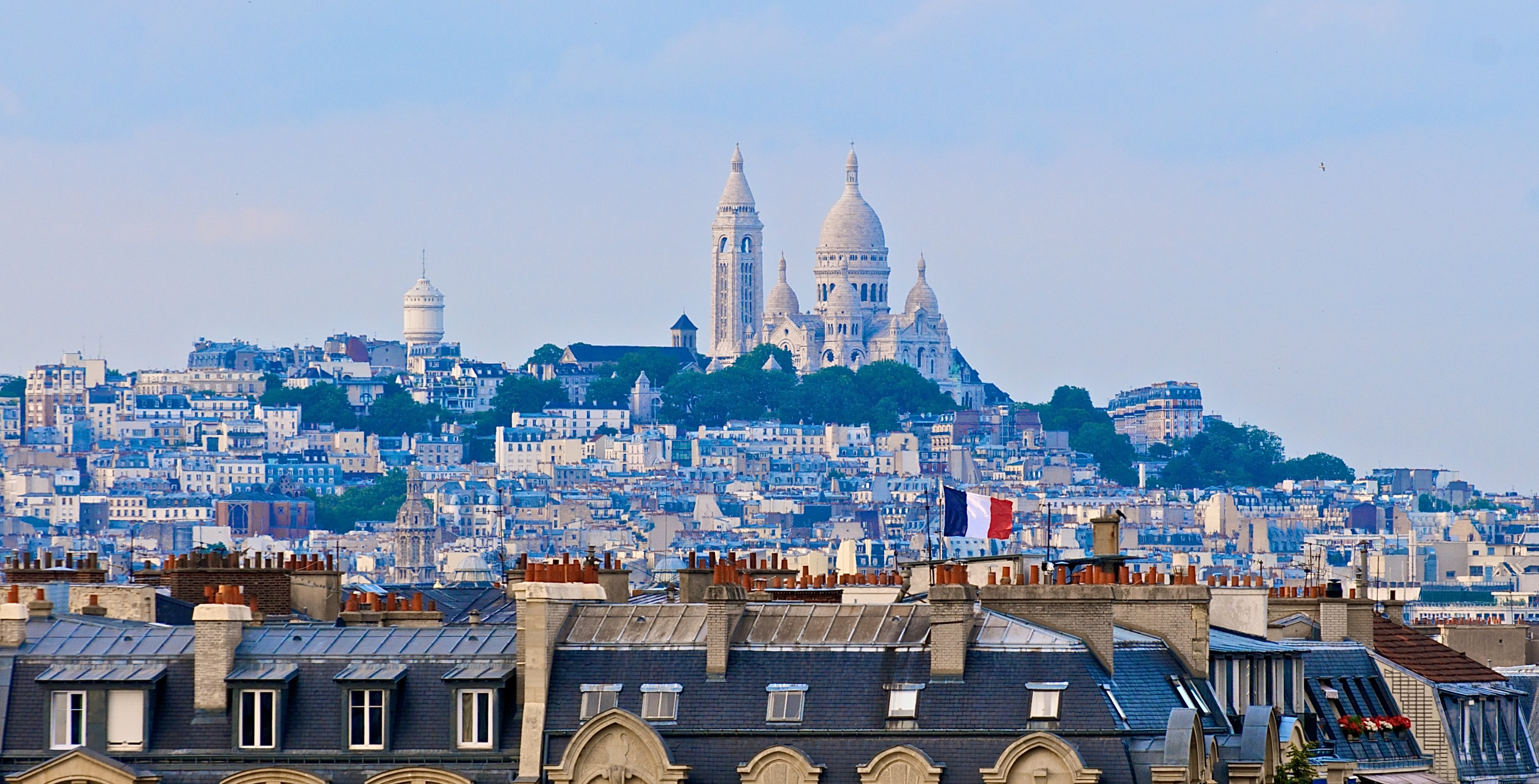
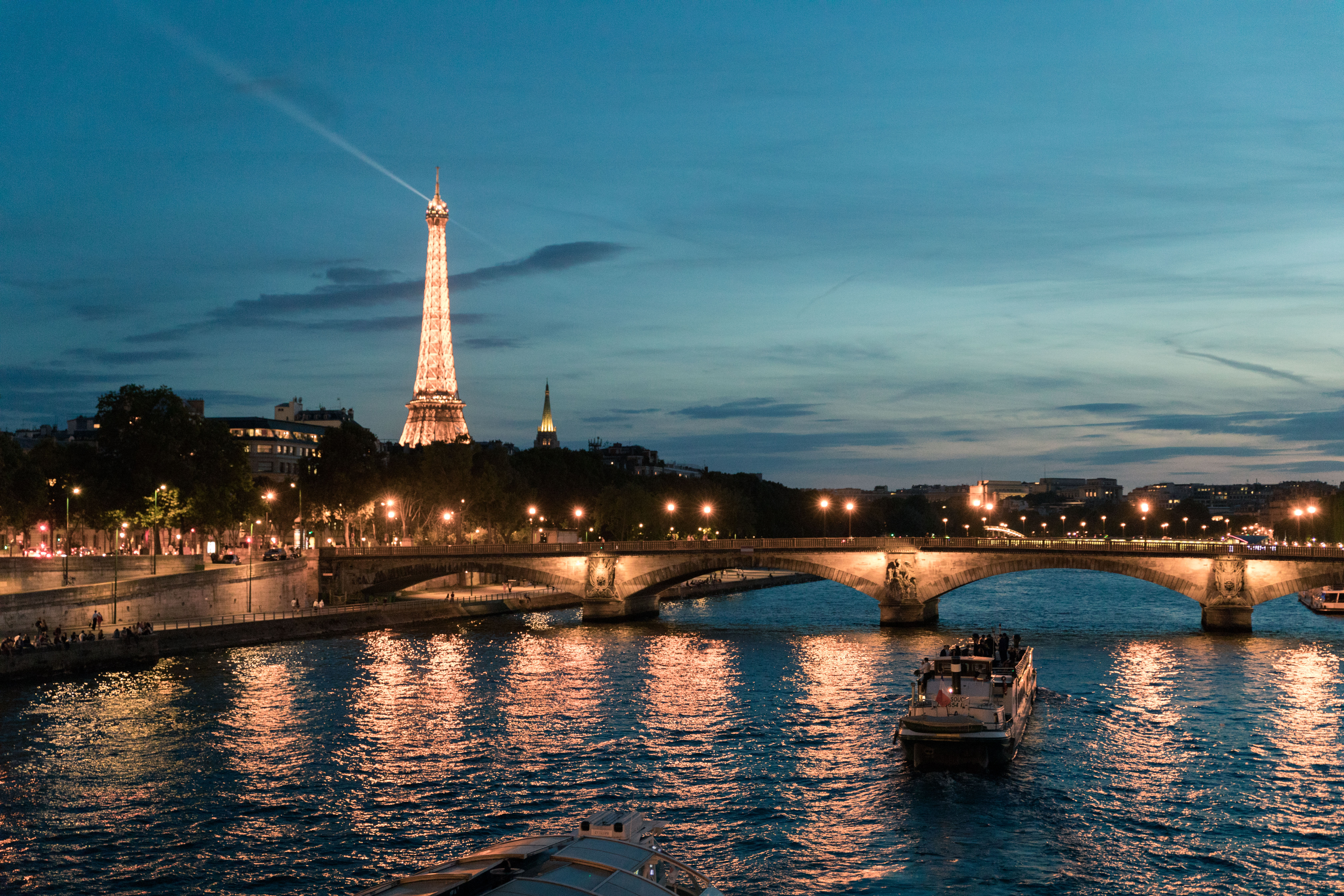
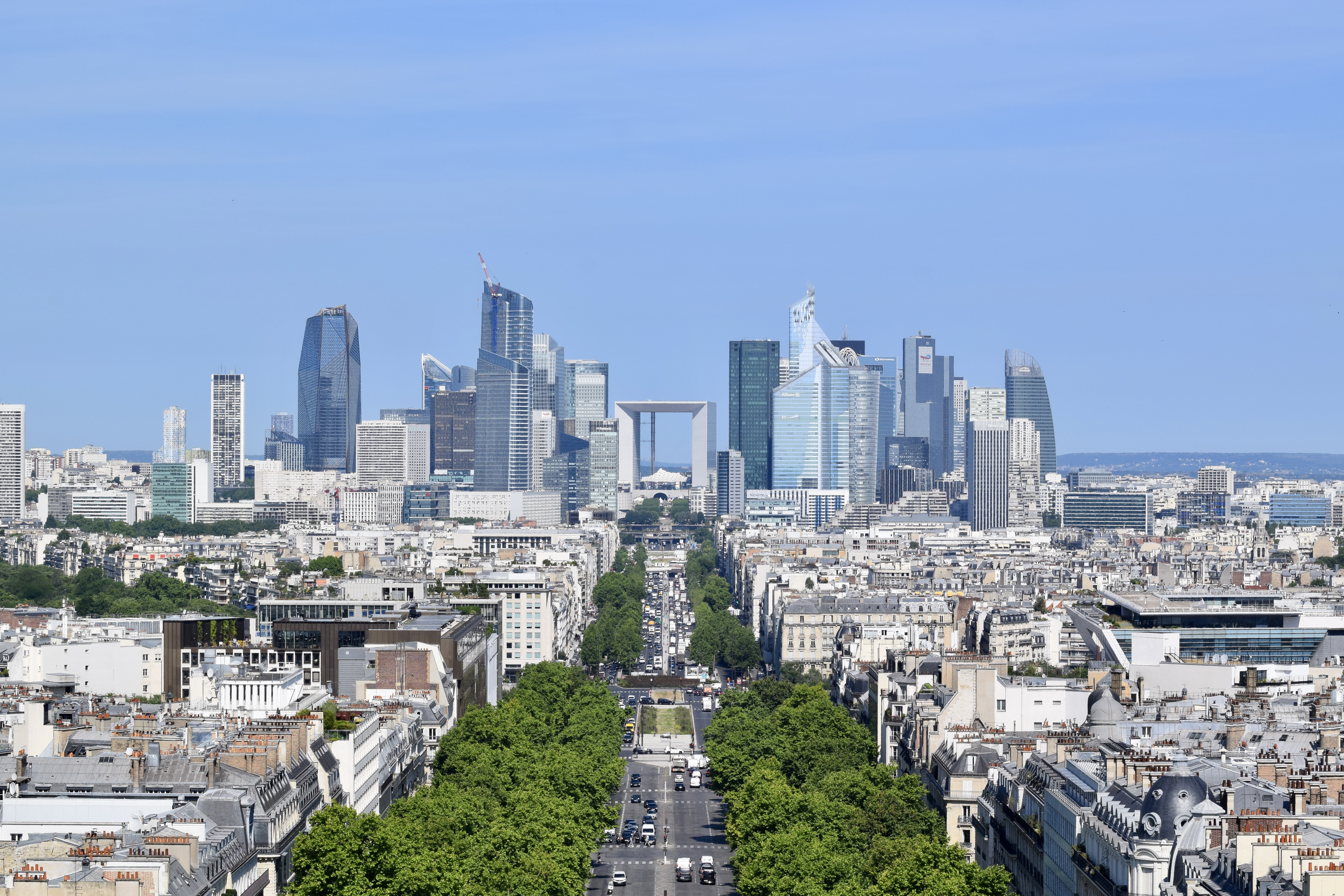
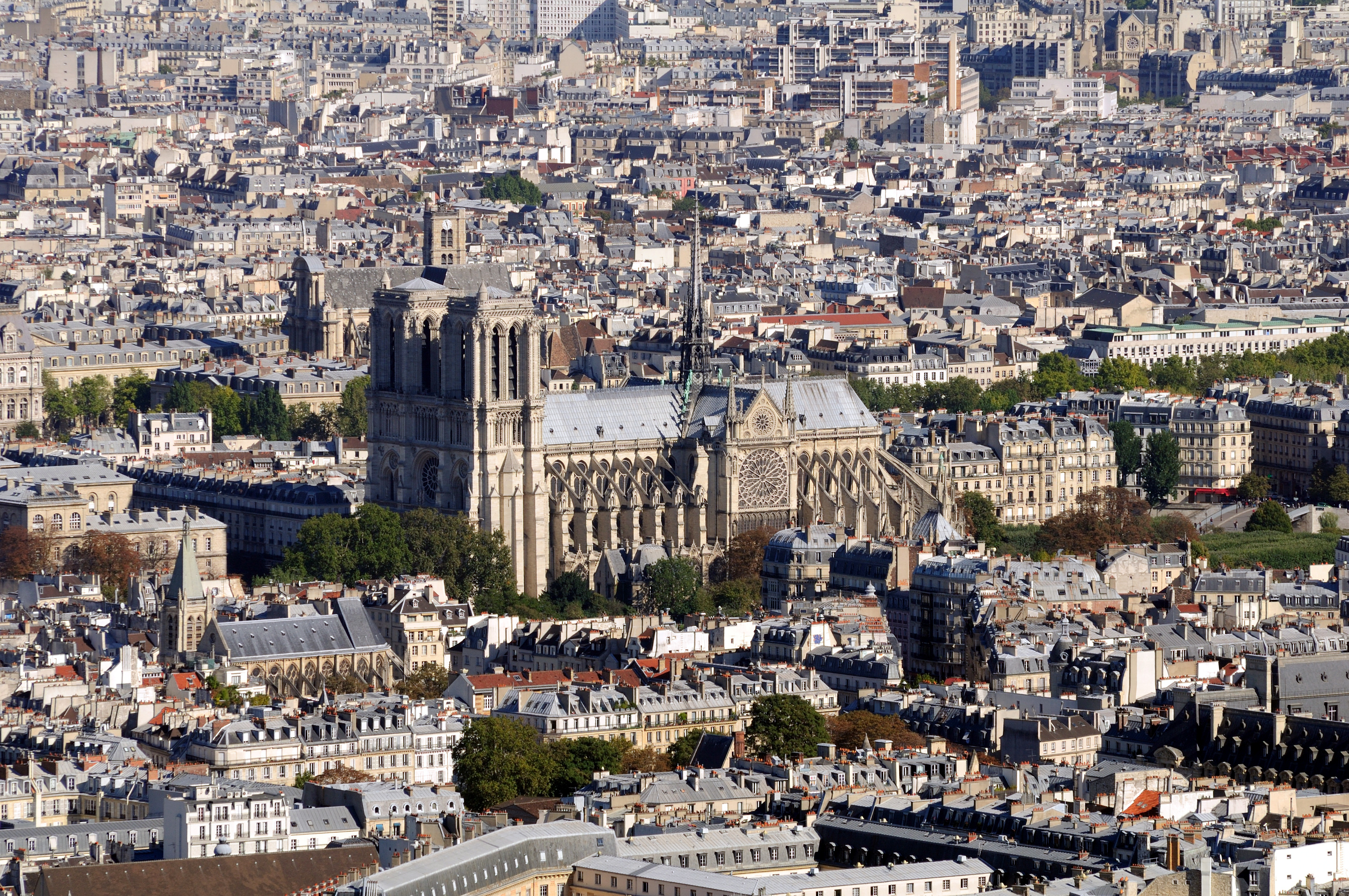
- Clockwise from top: Montmartre and the Sacré-Cœur, La Défense business district, Notre-Dame Cathedral, Seine with the Eiffel Tower in the background

- Location within the Île-de-France region
- Country: France
- Region: Île-de-France
- Department: Paris, Essonne, Hauts-de-Seine, Seine-Saint-Denis, Val-de-Marne, Val-d'Oise
- No. of communes: {{{nbcomm}}}
- Established: 1 January 2016

Government
  - President (2020–2026): Patrick Ollier (LR)
- Area: 814.2 km^{2} (314.4 sq mi)
- Population (2018): 7,075,028
  - Density: 8,690/km^{2} (22,510/sq mi)

GDP (2024)
  - Total: €630.56 billion (US$745.77 billion)
  - Per capita: €92,274 (US$109,132.46)
- Website: www.metropolegrandparis.fr

The Metropolis of Greater Paris (French: Métropole du Grand Paris, pronounced [metʁopɔl dy ɡʁɑ̃ paʁi]), (Note: There is an English translation.) also known as Greater Paris, is a métropole covering the City of Paris and its nearest surrounding suburbs which was created from Nicolas Sarkozy's administrative renovation of the city. Alongside the administrative renovation, the Grand Paris Express (GPE) transportation megaproject was also launched by Sarkozy.

The métropole came into existence after Sarkozy's presidency on 1 January 2016; it comprises 130 communes, including Paris and all 123 communes in the surrounding inner-suburban departments of the Petite Couronne (Hauts-de-Seine, Seine-Saint-Denis and Val-de-Marne), plus seven communes in two of the outer-suburban departments, including the communes of Argenteuil in Val-d'Oise, Savigny-sur-Orge, Juvisy-sur-Orge, Athis-Mons, Viry-Châtillon and Paray-Vieille-Poste in Essonne, the last of which covers part of Orly Airport. Part of the métropole comprises the former Seine department, which existed from 1795 to 1968.

Grand Paris covers 814 square kilometers (314 square miles), and has a population of over 7 million. The métropole is administered by a metropolitan council of 210 members, not directly elected, but chosen by the councils of the member communes. Its responsibilities include urban planning, housing, as well as environment protection.

Department	Population	GDP (2024)	GDP per capita (2024)
Paris	2,047,602	€279.938 billion	€136,715
Hauts-de-Seine	1,654,712	€198.210 billion	€119,785
Seine-Saint-Denis	1,704,316	€82.156 billion	€48,205
Val-de-Marne	1,426,929	€70.258 billion	€49,237
Grand Paris	6,833,559	€630.562 billion	€92,274

== History ==
The idea of Greater Paris was originally proposed by French President Nicolas Sarkozy as "a new global plan for the Paris metropolitan region" It first led to a new transportation master plan for the Paris region and to plans to develop several areas around Paris. The "Métropole du Grand Paris" was defined by the law of 27 January 2014 on the modernization of public territorial action and affirmation of cities as part of Act III of decentralization. The plans were considerably modified in December 2015, and the passage into action in two competences, economic development and protection of the environment was delayed from 2016 to 2017.

The plan was first announced on 17 September 2007 during the inauguration of "La Cité de l'architecture et du patrimoine", when Sarkozy declared his intent to create a "new comprehensive development project for Greater Paris". The project was organized by the French state, with the Minister of Culture and Communication charged with coordinating the consultation process.

In 2008 an international urban and architectural competition for the future development of metropolitan Paris was launched. Ten teams gathering architects, urban planners, geographers, landscape architects will offer their vision for building a Paris metropolis of the 21st century in the post-Kyoto era and make a prospective diagnosis for Paris and its suburbs that will define future developments in Greater Paris for the next 40 years.

The architects leading the ten multi-disciplinary teams were: Jean Nouvel, Christian de Portzamparc, Antoine Grumbach, Roland Castro, Yves Lion, Djamel Klouche, Richard Rogers, Bernardo Secchi, Paola Viganò, Finn Geipel, Giulia Andi, and Winy Maas.

Early versions of the plan proposed reforms to the local government structure of the Paris region by creating an integrated urban community encompassing the City of Paris and the surrounding Petite Couronne, however these were largely abandoned due to strong opposition from the socialist Mayor of Paris, Bertrand Delanoë, and the socialist head of the Île-de-France region, Jean-Paul Huchon.

== Objectives ==
The original plan for the Métropole declared these objectives: "The Métropole of Grand Paris is established in order to define and implement metropolitan action to improve the quality of life of its residents, reduce inequalities between regions within it, to develop an urban, social and economic sustainability model, tools to improve attractiveness and competitiveness for the benefit of the entire national territory. The Métropole of Grand Paris is developing a metropolitan project. The residents are associated with its development according to the guidelines determined by the metropolitan council as laid down by the development council.

This metropolitan project defines the general guidelines of the policy pursued by the Métropole of Grand Paris. It forms part of the implementation of the overall scheme of the Ile-de-France region. It includes a general, social, economic and environmental analysis of the metropolitan area, the strategic guidelines for the development of the metropolis as well as priority areas for intervention. The Metro project can be developed with the support of the Land and Technical Agency of the Paris Region, the International Workshop on Greater Paris, the Urban Planning Agencies and any other useful body."

== Transportation ==
Planned metro lines

Independently to the process described above, a position of Minister for the Grand Paris was created and Christian Blanc was appointed to occupy it. Blanc and his team prepared a transportation plan, announced on 29 April 2009. The Île-de-France region had already published its own transportation plan. Later, the architects of the consultation joined together to present a third transportation plan. After much negotiation, a compromise between the national government and the Île-de-France regional government was announced in January 2011 and the final plan subsequently approved.

The transport plan will be carried out in ten years, at a cost of 35 billion euros funded by the state, local governments and new debt. An important part of the project is a driverless subway linking important business and residential poles such as Versailles and the Charles de Gaulle airport but also banlieues like Montfermeil and Clichy-sous-Bois through a figure-eight track 140 km long and operating 24-hour, which will alone cost 21 billion euros. Another 14 billion euros will be spent in the extension and re-equipment of existing metro, regional and suburban lines.

== Criticism ==
The way Le Grand Paris has been handled was criticized by the architects themselves, especially by Jean Nouvel who wrote several virulent editorials against the Minister in charge of Le Grand Paris until June 2010, Christian Blanc.

Politically, the President of the Île-de-France region, Jean-Paul Huchon, and the Mayor of Paris, Bertrand Delanoë, both members of the French Socialist Party, opposed the initiatives taken by the national government, which they said were against the devolution of urban planning matters to local governments. In October 2011, Delanoë stated that the President "is trying to claim for himself an urban dynamic begun long ago by the local governments". Although Huchon had reached an agreement with the national government earlier in the year on the transportation network, he also declared that Grand Paris "is not a generic term to cover everything that is going on on the territory of the Île-de-France region (...) and even less a national certificate created to relabel local policies that were already in existence." Political opposition was also strong from the Green Party, led in the Île-de-France region by Cécile Duflot.

== Établissements Publics Territoriaux of the Grand Paris ==
The territories of Grand Paris

The 130 communes of the Métropole du Grand Paris are grouped in 12 établissements publics territoriaux (EPT) or territoires, which replaced the existing inter-communal public institutions and inherited their competences such as sport and socio-cultural amenities, water supply, sanitation, waste management and some urban and social policies.

T1 – City of Paris (not an établissement public territorial since there is only one commune)
T2 – Établissement public territorial Vallée Sud Grand Paris
T3 – Établissement public territorial Grand Paris Seine Ouest
T4 – Établissement public territorial Paris Ouest La Défense
T5 – Établissement public territorial Boucle Nord de Seine
T6 – Établissement public territorial Plaine Commune
T7 – Établissement public territorial Paris Terres d'Envol
T8 – Établissement public territorial Est Ensemble
T9 – Établissement public territorial Grand Paris - Grand Est
T10 – Établissement public territorial Paris-Est-Marne et Bois
T11 – Établissement public territorial Grand Paris Sud Est Avenir
T12 – Établissement public territorial Grand-Orly Seine Bièvre

== Communes ==
The Métropole du Grand Paris consists of the following 130 communes:

1. Ablon-sur-Seine
2. Alfortville
3. Antony
4. Arcueil
5. Argenteuil
6. Asnières-sur-Seine
7. Athis-Mons
8. Aubervilliers
9. Aulnay-sous-Bois
10. Bagneux
11. Bagnolet
12. Le Blanc-Mesnil
13. Bobigny
14. Bois-Colombes
15. Boissy-Saint-Léger
16. Bondy
17. Bonneuil-sur-Marne
18. Boulogne-Billancourt
19. Le Bourget
20. Bourg-la-Reine
21. Bry-sur-Marne
22. Cachan
23. Champigny-sur-Marne
24. Charenton-le-Pont
25. Châtenay-Malabry
26. Châtillon
27. Chaville
28. Chennevières-sur-Marne
29. Chevilly-Larue
30. Choisy-le-Roi
31. Clamart
32. Clichy
33. Clichy-sous-Bois
34. Colombes
35. Coubron
36. Courbevoie
37. La Courneuve
38. Créteil
39. Drancy
40. Dugny
41. Épinay-sur-Seine
42. Fontenay-aux-Roses
43. Fontenay-sous-Bois
44. Fresnes
45. Gagny
46. Garches
47. La Garenne-Colombes
48. Gennevilliers
49. Gentilly
50. Gournay-sur-Marne
51. L'Haÿ-les-Roses
52. L'Île-Saint-Denis
53. Issy-les-Moulineaux
54. Ivry-sur-Seine
55. Joinville-le-Pont
56. Juvisy-sur-Orge
57. Le Kremlin-Bicêtre
58. Les Lilas
59. Levallois-Perret
60. Limeil-Brévannes
61. Livry-Gargan
62. Maisons-Alfort
63. Malakoff
64. Mandres-les-Roses
65. Marnes-la-Coquette
66. Marolles-en-Brie
67. Meudon
68. Montfermeil
69. Montreuil
70. Montrouge
71. Morangis
72. Nanterre
73. Neuilly-Plaisance
74. Neuilly-sur-Marne
75. Neuilly-sur-Seine
76. Nogent-sur-Marne
77. Noiseau
78. Noisy-le-Grand
79. Noisy-le-Sec
80. Orly
81. Ormesson-sur-Marne
82. Pantin
83. Paray-Vieille-Poste
84. Paris
85. Les Pavillons-sous-Bois
86. Périgny
87. Le Perreux-sur-Marne
88. Pierrefitte-sur-Seine
89. Le Plessis-Robinson
90. Le Plessis-Trévise
91. Le Pré-Saint-Gervais
92. Puteaux
93. La Queue-en-Brie
94. Le Raincy
95. Romainville
96. Rosny-sous-Bois
97. Rueil-Malmaison
98. Rungis
99. Saint-Cloud
100. Saint-Denis
101. Saint-Mandé
102. Saint-Maur-des-Fossés
103. Saint-Maurice
104. Saint-Ouen-sur-Seine
105. Santeny
106. Savigny-sur-Orge
107. Sceaux
108. Sevran
109. Sèvres
110. Stains
111. Sucy-en-Brie
112. Suresnes
113. Thiais
114. Tremblay-en-France
115. Valenton
116. Vanves
117. Vaucresson
118. Vaujours
119. Villecresnes
120. Ville-d'Avray
121. Villejuif
122. Villemomble
123. Villeneuve-la-Garenne
124. Villeneuve-le-Roi
125. Villeneuve-Saint-Georges
126. Villepinte
127. Villetaneuse
128. Villiers-sur-Marne
129. Vincennes
130. Viry-Châtillon
131. Vitry-sur-Seine

== See also ==
- Paris metropolitan area
- Grand Paris Express
- Île-de-France
