= Canton of Villemomble =

Coordinates: 48.88°N 2.51°E

The canton of Villemomble is an administrative division of the Seine-Saint-Denis department, Île-de-France region, northern France. Its borders were modified at the French canton reorganisation which came into effect in March 2015. Its seat is in Villemomble.

It consists of the following communes:

1. Neuilly-Plaisance
2. Le Raincy
3. Villemomble
