= Canton of Livry-Gargan =

Coordinates: 48.92°N 2.53°E

The canton of Livry-Gargan is an administrative division of the Seine-Saint-Denis department, Île-de-France region, northern France. Its borders were modified at the French canton reorganisation which came into effect in March 2015. Its seat is in Livry-Gargan.

It consists of the following communes:

1. Clichy-sous-Bois
2. Livry-Gargan
