= Seine-Saint-Denis =

Department of France in Île-de-France

- Department of France
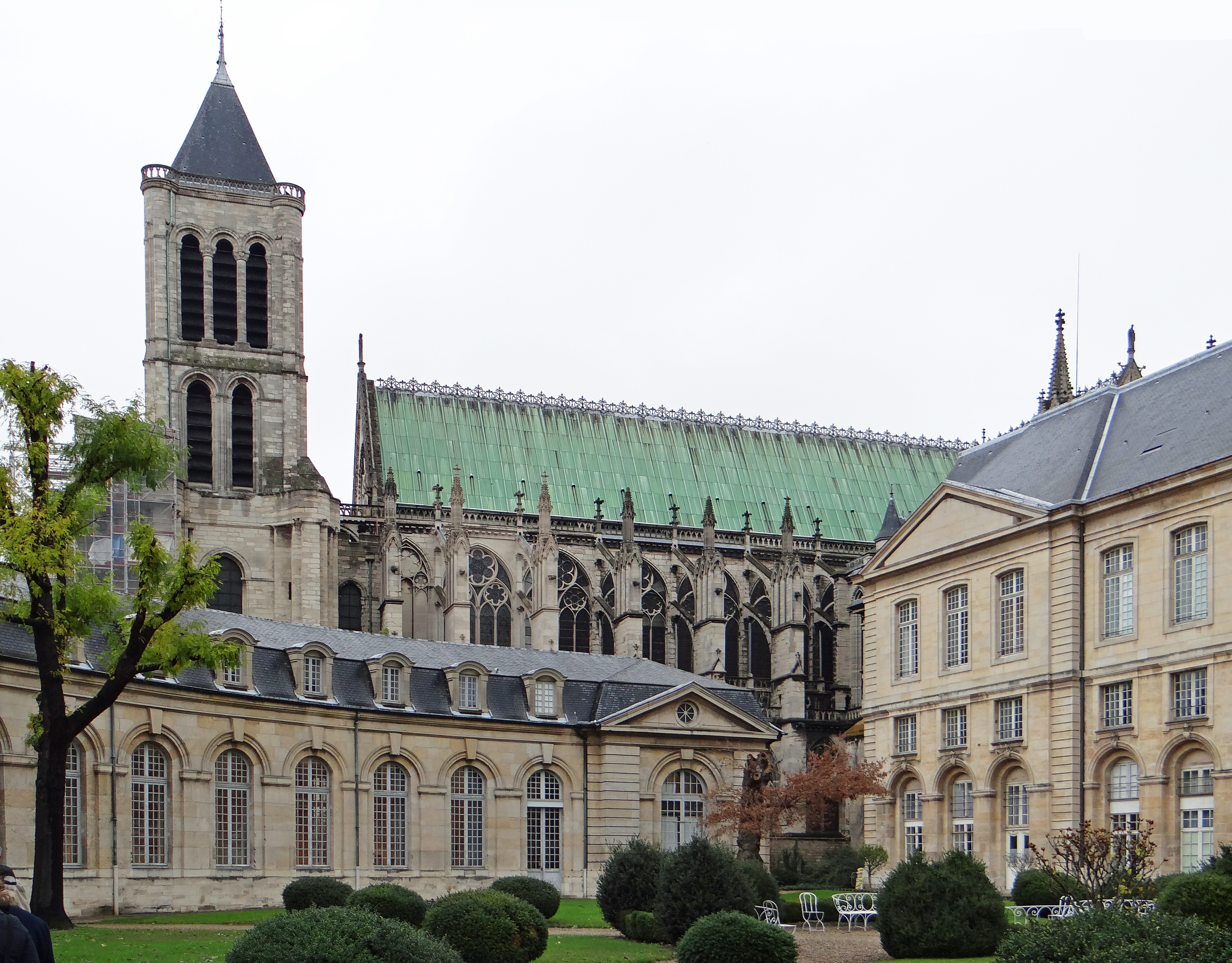
- Basilica of Saint-Denis

- Flag Coat of arms

- Location of Seine-Saint-Denis in France
- Coordinates: 48°54′N 02°29′E
- Country: France
- Region: Île-de-France
- Prefecture: Bobigny
- Subprefectures: Le Raincy; Saint-Denis

Government
  - President of the Departmental Council: Stéphane Troussel (PS)
  - Prefect: Jacques Witkowski

Area^{1}
  - Total: 236 km^{2} (91 sq mi)

Population (2023)
  - Total: 1,704,316
  - Rank: 4th
  - Density: 7,220/km^{2} (18,700/sq mi)

GDP
  - Total: €66.227 billion (2021)
  - Per capita: €38,688 (2021)
- Time zone: UTC+1 (CET)
  - Summer (DST): UTC+2 (CEST)
- Department number: 93
- Arrondissements: 3
- Cantons: 21
- Communes: 39
- ^1 French Land Register data, which exclude estuaries and lakes, ponds and glaciers larger than 1 km^{2}

Seine-Saint-Denis (French pronunciation: [sɛn sɛ̃ d(ə)ni]) is a department of France located in the Grand Paris metropolis in the Île-de-France region. In French, it is often referred to colloquially as quatre-vingt-treize or neuf trois ("ninety-three" or "nine three"), after its official administrative number, 93. Its prefecture is Bobigny.

In 2023, it had a population of 1,704,316 across 39 communes.

== Geography ==
=== Principal towns ===
The most populous commune is Saint-Denis; the prefecture Bobigny is the ninth-most populous. As of 2023, there are 6 communes with more than 70,000 inhabitants:

Commune	Population (2023)
Saint-Denis	149,077
Montreuil	111,934
Aubervilliers	88,365
Aulnay-sous-Bois	87,599
Noisy-le-Grand	72,978
Drancy	72,390

== Administration ==
Seine-Saint-Denis is made up of three departmental arrondissements and 39 communes:

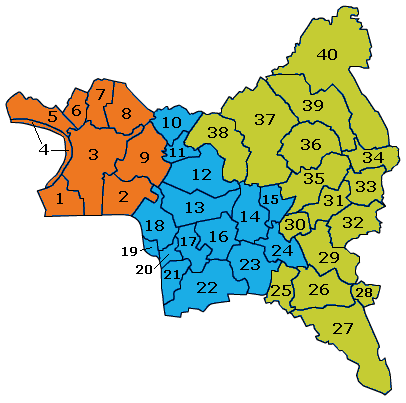

Arrondissement of
Saint-Denis:

1. Saint-Ouen-sur-Seine
2. Aubervilliers
3. Saint-Denis
4. L'Île-Saint-Denis
5. Épinay-sur-Seine
6. Villetaneuse
7. Pierrefitte-sur-Seine (part of Saint-Denis since 2025)
8. Stains
9. La Courneuve

Arrondissement of
Bobigny:

10. Dugny
11. Le Bourget
12. Drancy
13. Bobigny
14. Bondy
15. Les Pavillons-sous-Bois
16. Noisy-le-Sec
17. Romainville
18. Pantin
19. Le Pré-Saint-Gervais
20. Les Lilas
21. Bagnolet
22. Montreuil
23. Rosny-sous-Bois
24. Villemomble

Arrondissement of
Le Raincy:

25. Neuilly-Plaisance
26. Neuilly-sur-Marne
27. Noisy-le-Grand
28. Gournay-sur-Marne
29. Gagny
30. Le Raincy
31. Clichy-sous-Bois
32. Montfermeil
33. Coubron
34. Vaujours
35. Livry-Gargan
36. Sevran
37. Aulnay-sous-Bois
38. Le Blanc-Mesnil
39. Villepinte
40. Tremblay-en-France

== History ==
In 2017, Seine-Saint-Denis was the location of 18% of all drug offences in metropolitan France. In 2018, the department had the highest crime rate in metropolitan France. When two suspects (known criminals from the department) were arrested in the 2025 Louvre robbery it was noted by The Guardian to have the highest poverty and crime rate in mainland France.

== Demographics ==
In 2018, the poverty rate was twice the national average at 28%, the unemployment rate was 3% above the national average, at 12.7%. In 2018, it was estimated that 8–20% of the population in the department were illegal immigrants.

Population development since 1881:

Historical population

Year	Pop.	±% p.a.
1881	180,412	—
1891	230,992	+2.50%
1901	307,329	+2.90%
1911	411,443	+2.96%
1921	504,956	+2.07%
1931	769,315	+4.30%
1936	776,378	+0.18%
1946	730,361	−0.61%
1954	845,231	+1.84%
1962	1,083,724	+3.16%

Year	Pop.	±% p.a.
1968	1,249,606	+2.40%
1975	1,322,127	+0.81%
1982	1,324,301	+0.02%
1990	1,381,197	+0.53%
1999	1,382,861	+0.01%
2007	1,502,340	+1.04%
2012	1,538,726	+0.48%
2017	1,623,111	+1.07%
2023	1,704,316	+0.82%

=== Education ===
An education study confirmed falling levels of literacy in the area, where the percentage of pupils who had 25 errors or more increased from 5.4% in 1987 to 19.8% in 2015.

=== Place of birth of residents ===
Place of birth of residents of Seine-Saint-Denis in 1999
Born in metropolitan France	Born outside metropolitan France			
72.5%	27.5%			
72.5%	Born in overseas France	Born in foreign countries with French citizenship at birth^{1}	EU-15 immigrants^{2}	Non-EU-15 immigrants
72.5%	3.1%	2.7%	4.4%	17.3%
^{1} This group is made up largely of former French settlers, such as pieds-noirs in Northwest Africa, followed by former colonial citizens who had French citizenship at birth (such as was often the case for the native elite in French colonies), as well as to a lesser extent foreign-born children of French expatriates. A foreign country is understood as a country not part of France in 1999, so a person born for example in 1950 in Algeria, when Algeria was an integral part of France, is nonetheless listed as a person born in a foreign country in French statistics.^{2} An immigrant is a person born in a foreign country not having French citizenship at birth. An immigrant may have acquired French citizenship since moving to France, but is still considered an immigrant in French statistics. On the other hand, persons born in France with foreign citizenship (the children of immigrants) are not listed as immigrants.

== Politics ==
=== Presidential elections 2nd round ===
Election	Winning candidate	Party	%	2nd place candidate	Party	%
2022	Emmanuel Macron	LREM	73.72	Marine Le Pen	FN	26.28
2017	Emmanuel Macron	LREM	78.82	Marine Le Pen	FN	21.18
2012	François Hollande	PS	65.32	Nicolas Sarkozy	UMP	34.68
2007	Ségolène Royal	PS	56.54	Nicolas Sarkozy	UMP	43.46
2002	Jacques Chirac	RPR	82.56	Jean-Marie Le Pen	FN	17.44
1995	Lionel Jospin	PS	51.84	Jacques Chirac	RPR	48.16

=== Current National Assembly Representatives ===
Seine-Saint-Denis's constituencies for the National Assembly

Constituency	Member	Party
Seine-Saint-Denis's 1st constituency	Éric Coquerel	La France Insoumise
Seine-Saint-Denis's 2nd constituency	Stéphane Peu	French Communist Party
Seine-Saint-Denis's 3rd constituency	Thomas Portes	La France Insoumise
Seine-Saint-Denis's 4th constituency	Soumya Bourouaha	French Communist Party
Seine-Saint-Denis's 5th constituency	Aly Diouara	Seine-Saint-Denis at Heart!
Seine-Saint-Denis's 6th constituency	Bastien Lachaud	La France Insoumise
Seine-Saint-Denis's 7th constituency	Alexis Corbière	L'Après
Seine-Saint-Denis's 8th constituency	Fatiha Keloua Hachi	Socialist Party
Seine-Saint-Denis's 9th constituency	Aurélie Trouvé	La France Insoumise
Seine-Saint-Denis's 10th constituency	Nadège Abomangoli	La France Insoumise
Seine-Saint-Denis's 11th constituency	Clémentine Autain	L'Après
Seine-Saint-Denis's 12th constituency	Jérôme Legavre	Independent Workers' Party

== Tourism ==
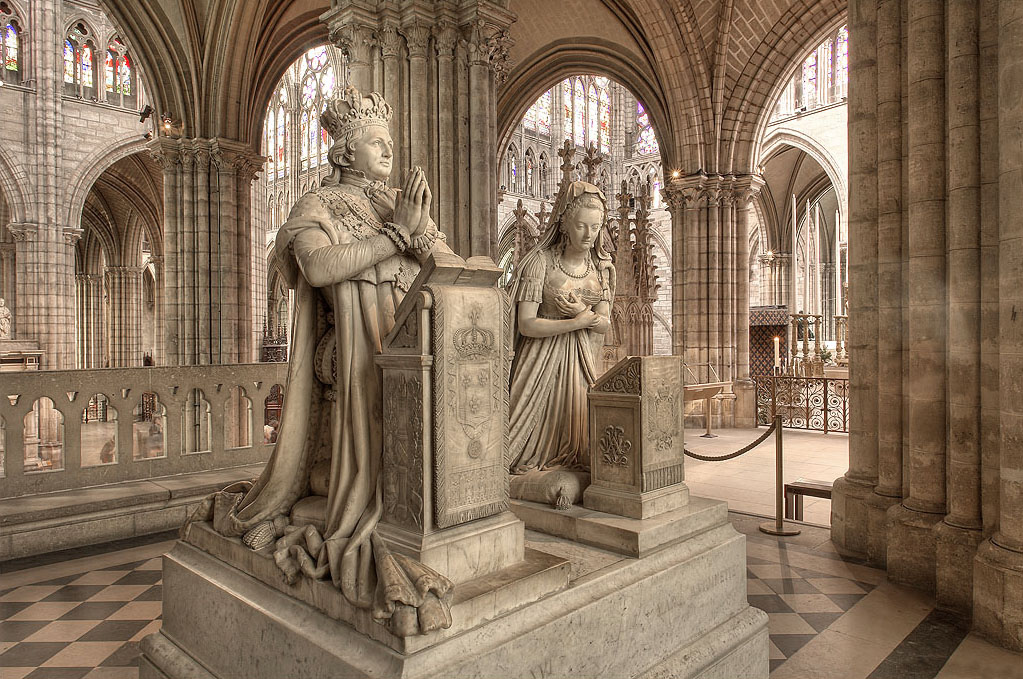
Memorial to King Louis XVI and Queen Marie Antoinette in Basilica of St Denis

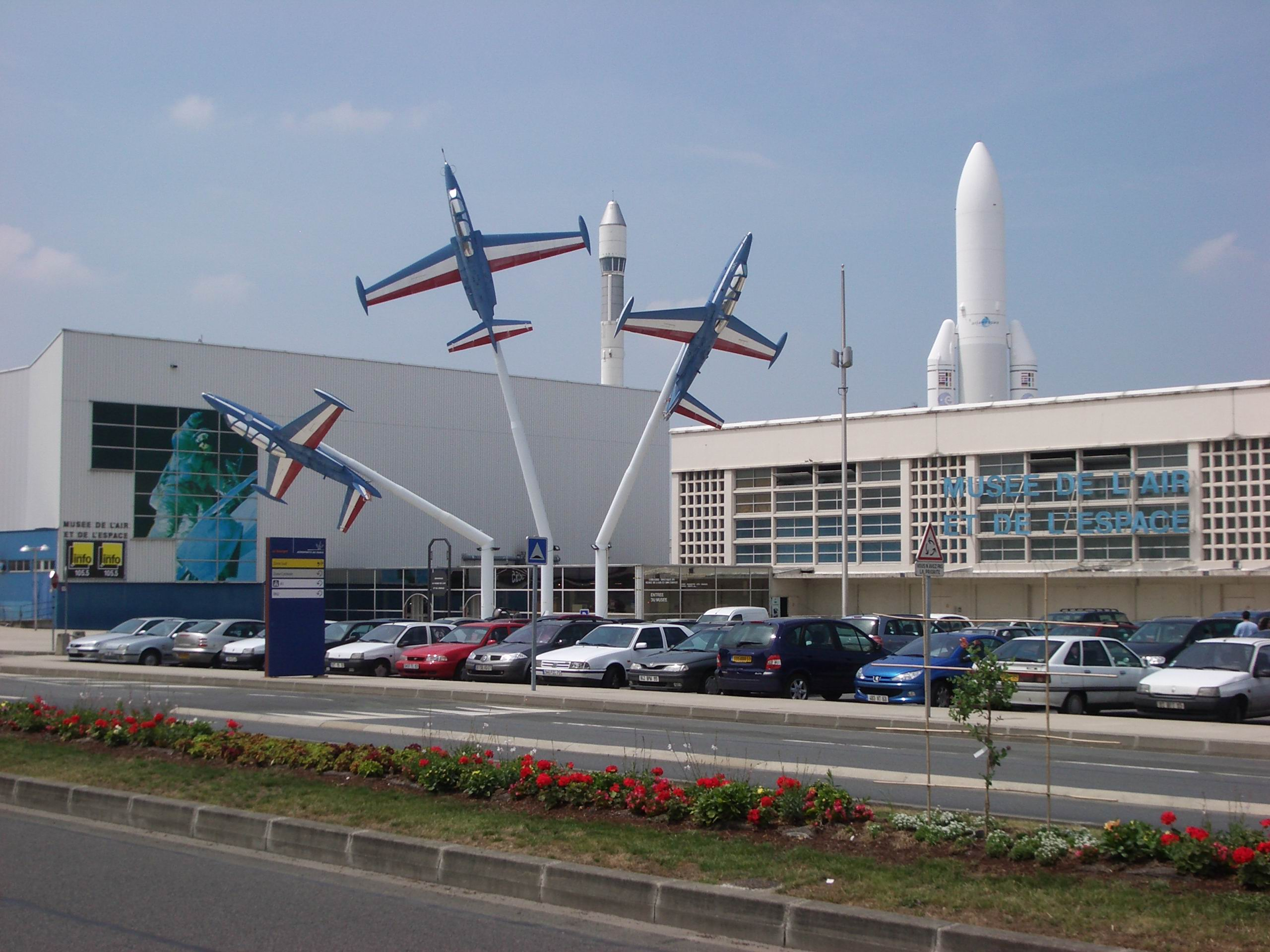
Aerospace Museum in Le Bourget

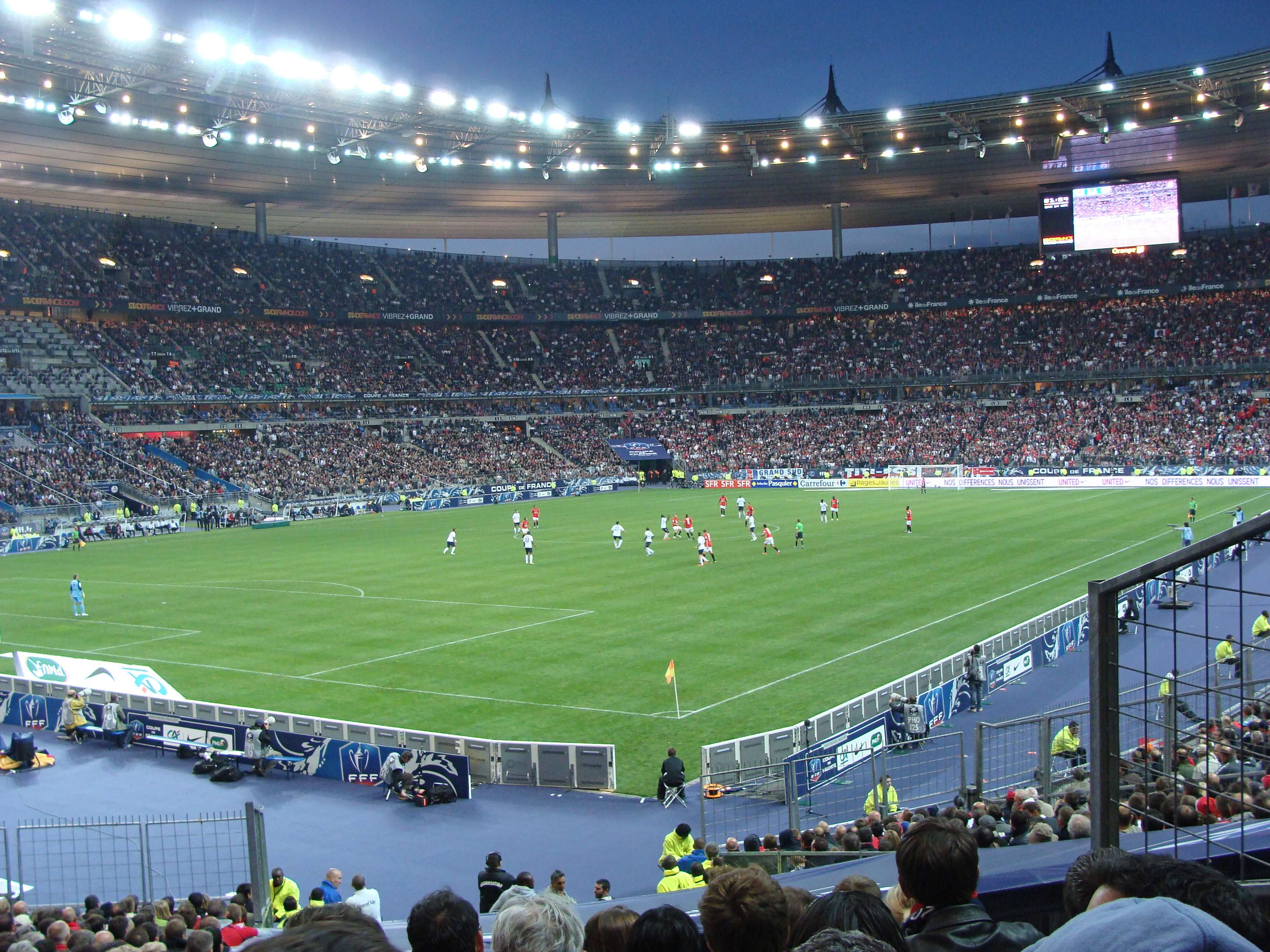
Stade de France

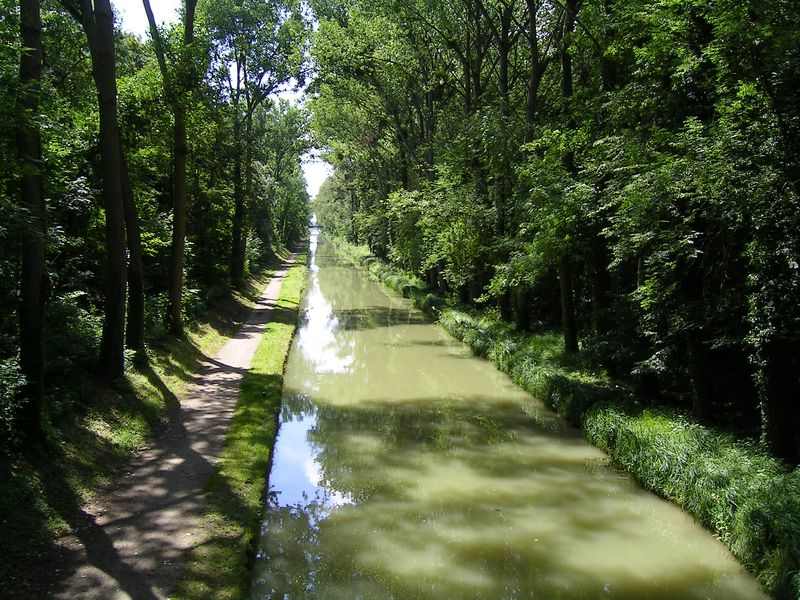
Canal de l'Ourcq
