= Hôtel de Ville, Saint-Denis =

Hôtel de Ville, Saint-Denis may refer to:

- Hôtel de Ville, Saint-Denis, Réunion
- Hôtel de Ville, Saint-Denis, Seine-Saint-Denis
