= Saint-Denis, Seine-Saint-Denis =

Subprefecture and commune in France

Saint-Denis
- Subprefecture and commune
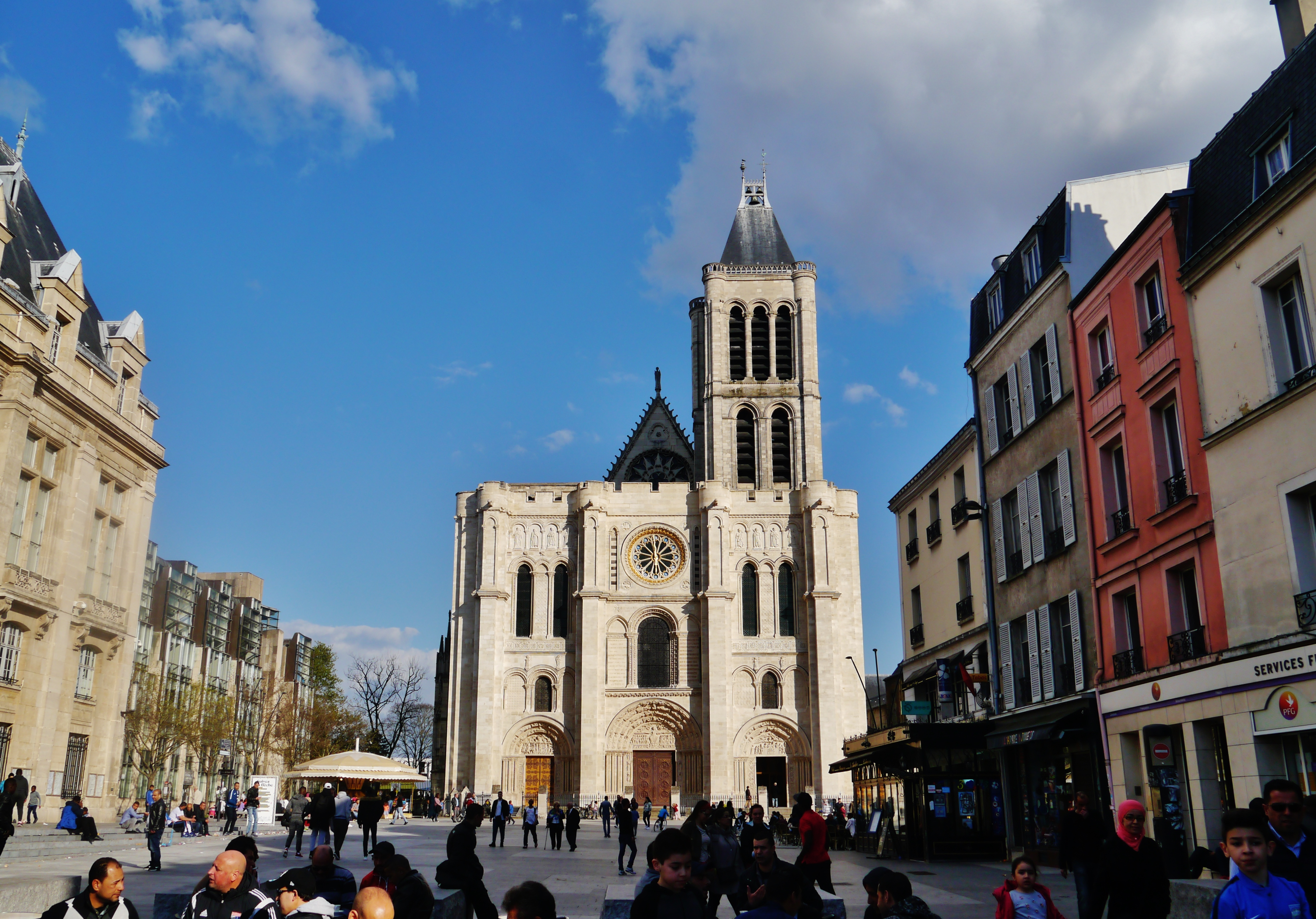
- Basilica of Saint-Denis

- Coat of arms

- Location (in red) within Paris inner suburbs
- Location of Saint-Denis
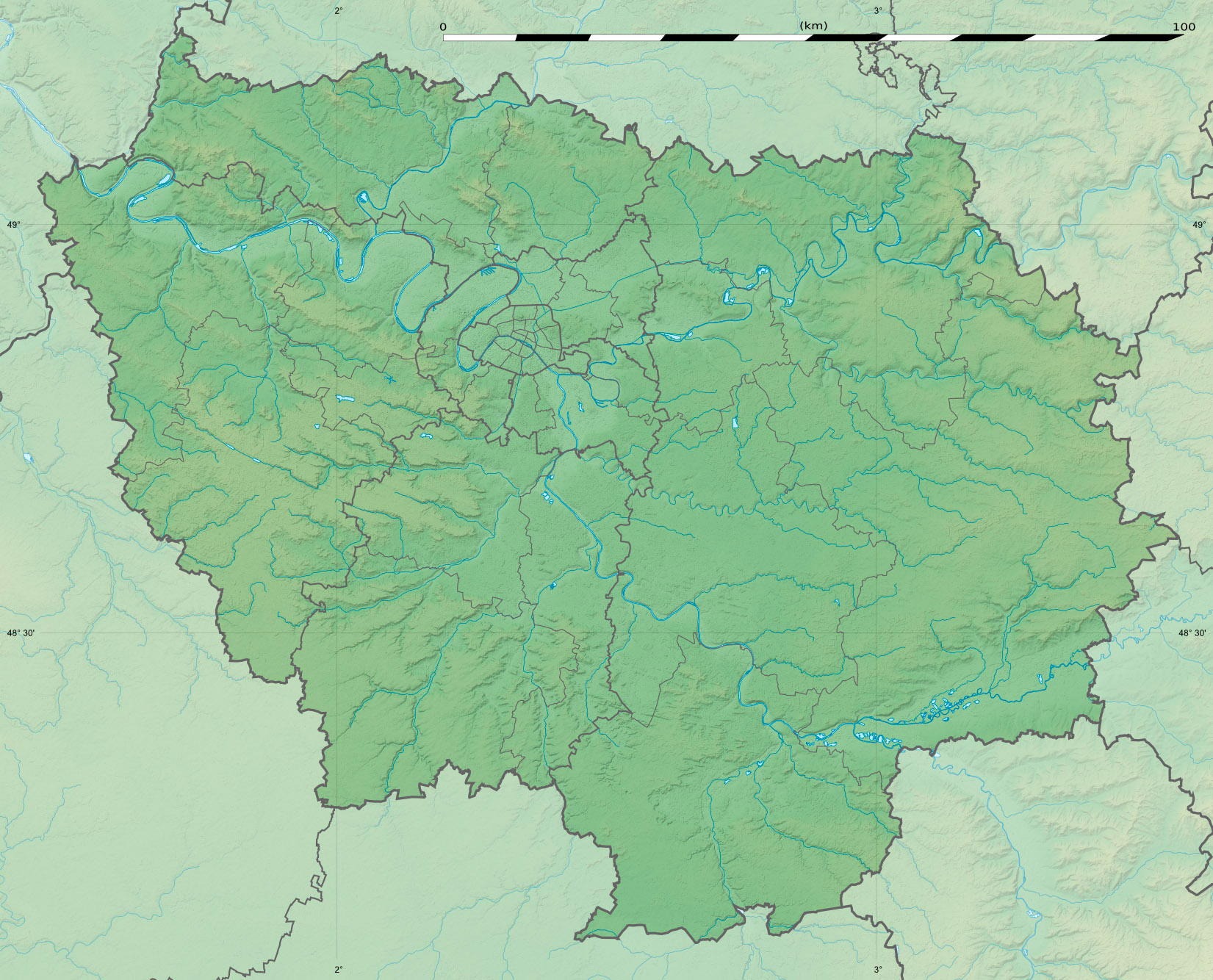
- Location within France Location within Île-de-France (region)
- Coordinates: 48°56′08″N 2°21′14″E
- Country: France
- Region: Île-de-France
- Department: Seine-Saint-Denis
- Arrondissement: Saint-Denis
- Canton: Saint-Denis-1 and 2
- Intercommunality: Grand Paris

Government
  - Mayor (2026–32): Bally Bagayoko
- Area^{1} 2025: 15.77 km^{2} (6.09 sq mi)
- Highest elevation: 98 m (322 ft)
- Lowest elevation: 23 m (75 ft)
- Population (2023): 149,077
  - Density: 9,453/km^{2} (24,480/sq mi)
- Demonym: Dionysien
- Time zone: UTC+01:00 (CET)
  - Summer (DST): UTC+02:00 (CEST)
- INSEE/Postal code: 93066 /93200, 93210 (La Plaine)
- Website: ville-saint-denis.fr
- ^{1} French Land Register data, which excludes lakes, ponds, glaciers > 1 km^{2} (0.386 sq mi or 247 acres) and river estuaries.

Saint-Denis (/ˌsæ̃dəˈniː/; French: [sɛ̃d(ə)ni]) is a commune in the northern suburbs of Paris, France. It is located 9.4 kilometres (5 7/8 miles) from the centre of Paris. Saint-Denis is the most populated suburb of Paris, with a population of 149,077 as of 2023. It is a subprefecture (French: sous-préfecture) of the department of Seine-Saint-Denis, being the seat of the arrondissement of Saint-Denis. It is also part of the Métropole du Grand Paris.

The commune borders the 18th arrondissement of Paris to the south, roughly along the stretch between Porte des Poissonniers and Porte de la Chapelle, continuing to the Porte d'Aubervilliers.

Saint-Denis is home to the royal necropolis of the Basilica of Saint-Denis and was also the location of the associated abbey.

The commune is also home to France's national association and rugby football stadium, Stade de France, which was built for the 1998 FIFA World Cup. The stadium also hosted the rugby and athletics events, along with the closing ceremony, for the 2024 Summer Olympics. The athletics events & closing ceremony for the 2024 Summer Paralympics were also held at the stadium.

Saint-Denis is a formerly industrial suburb currently changing its economic base. It has been the second most populated commune in Île-de-France after Paris since 1 January 2025, following the absorption of Pierrefitte-sur-Seine to its north, as passed by both municipal councils on 30 May 2024.

== Name ==
Until the 3rd century, Saint-Denis was a small settlement called Catolacus or Catulliacum, probably meaning "estate of Catullius", a Gallo-Roman landowner. About 250 AD, the first bishop of Paris, Saint Denis, was martyred on Montmartre hill and buried in Catolacus. Shortly after 250 AD, his grave became a shrine and a pilgrimage centre, with the building of the Abbey of Saint Denis, and the settlement was renamed Saint-Denis.

In 1793, during the French Revolution, under the dictatorship of Robespierre, Saint-Denis was renamed Franciade in a gesture of rejection of religion. In 1803, however, under the Consulate of Napoléon Bonaparte, the city reverted to its former name of Saint-Denis.

== Geography ==
Saint-Denis is located in the Pays de France or Plaine de France region, a natural plain to the north of Paris, the southern portion of which is heavily urbanized.

== History ==
During its history, Saint-Denis has been closely associated with the French royal house. Starting from Dagobert I (c. 603–639), almost every French king was buried in the Basilica.

However, Saint-Denis is older than that. In the 2nd century, there was a Gallo-Roman village named Catolacus on the location that Saint-Denis occupies today. Saint Denis, the first bishop of Paris and patron saint of France, was martyred in about 250 AD and buried in the cemetery of Catolacus. Denis' tomb quickly became a place of worship. Around 475 AD, Sainte Geneviève had a small chapel erected on Denis' tomb, which by then had become a popular destination for pilgrims. It was this chapel that Dagobert I had rebuilt and turned into the Abbey of Saint Denis. Dagobert granted many privileges to the abbey: independence from the bishop of Paris, the right to hold a market, and, most importantly, he was buried in Saint-Denis; a tradition which was followed by almost all his successors. During the Middle Ages, because of the privileges granted by Dagobert, Saint-Denis grew to become very important. Merchants from all over Europe (and indeed from the Byzantine Empire) came to visit its market.

In 1140, Abbot Suger, counselor to the King, granted further privileges to the citizens of Saint-Denis. He also started the work of enlarging the Basilica of Saint Denis that still exists today, often cited as the first example of early Gothic Architecture. The new church was consecrated in 1144.

Saint-Denis was depopulated in the Hundred Years' War; of its 10,000 citizens, only 3,000 remained after the war.

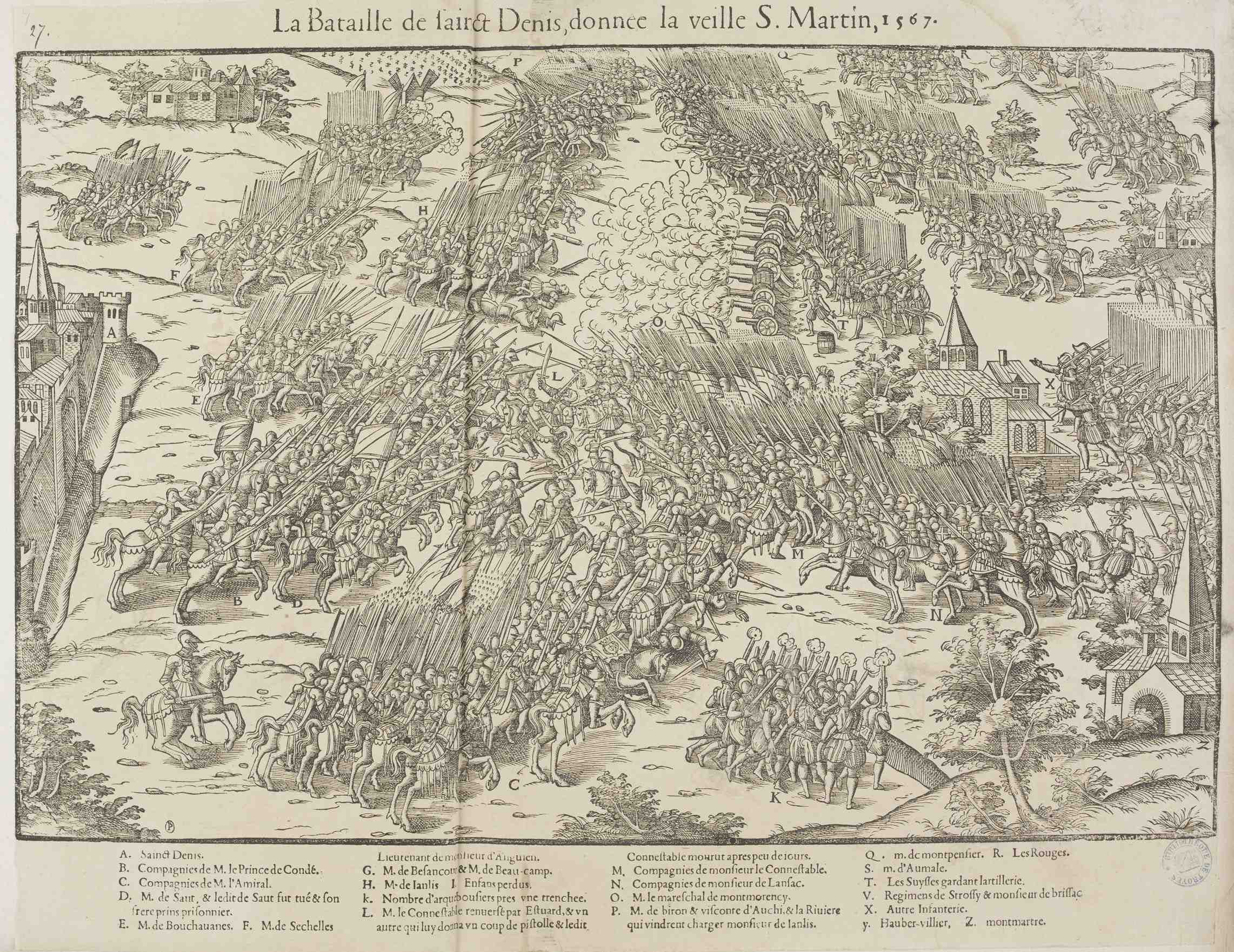
Battle of Saint-Denis (1567)

During the French Wars of Religion, the Battle of Saint-Denis was fought between Catholics and Protestants on 10 November 1567. The Protestants were defeated, but the Catholic commander Anne de Montmorency was killed. In 1590, the city surrendered to Henry IV, who converted to Catholicism in 1593 in the abbey of Saint-Denis.

King Louis XIV (1638-1715) started several industries in Saint-Denis: weaving and spinning mills and dyehouses. His successor, Louis XV (1710-1774), whose daughter was a nun in the Carmelite convent, took a lively interest in the city: he added a chapel to the convent and also renovated the buildings of the royal abbey.

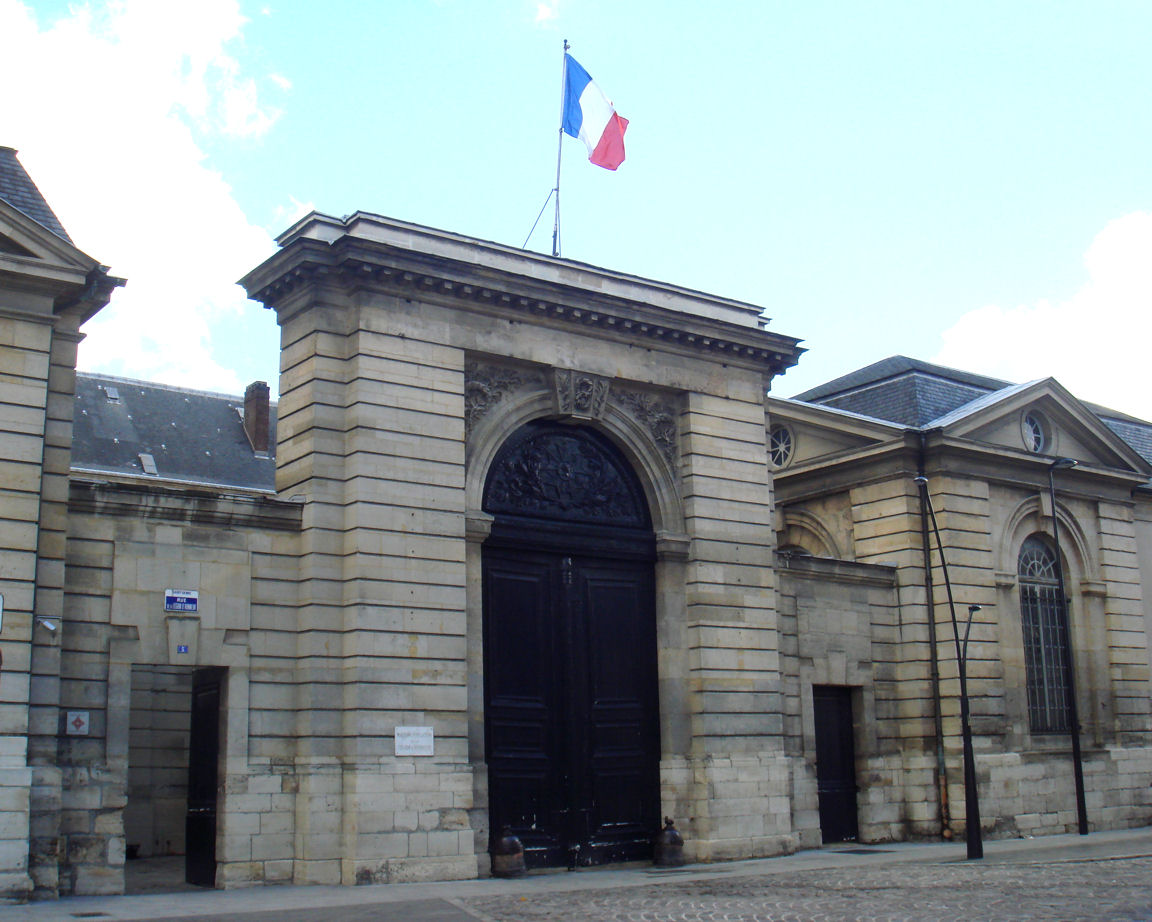
Maison d'éducation de la Légion d'honneur de Saint-Denis

During the French Revolution, not only was the city renamed "Franciade" from 1793 to 1803, but the royal necropolis was looted and destroyed. The remains were removed from the tombs and thrown together; during the French Restoration, since they could not be sorted out anymore, they were reburied in a common ossuary.

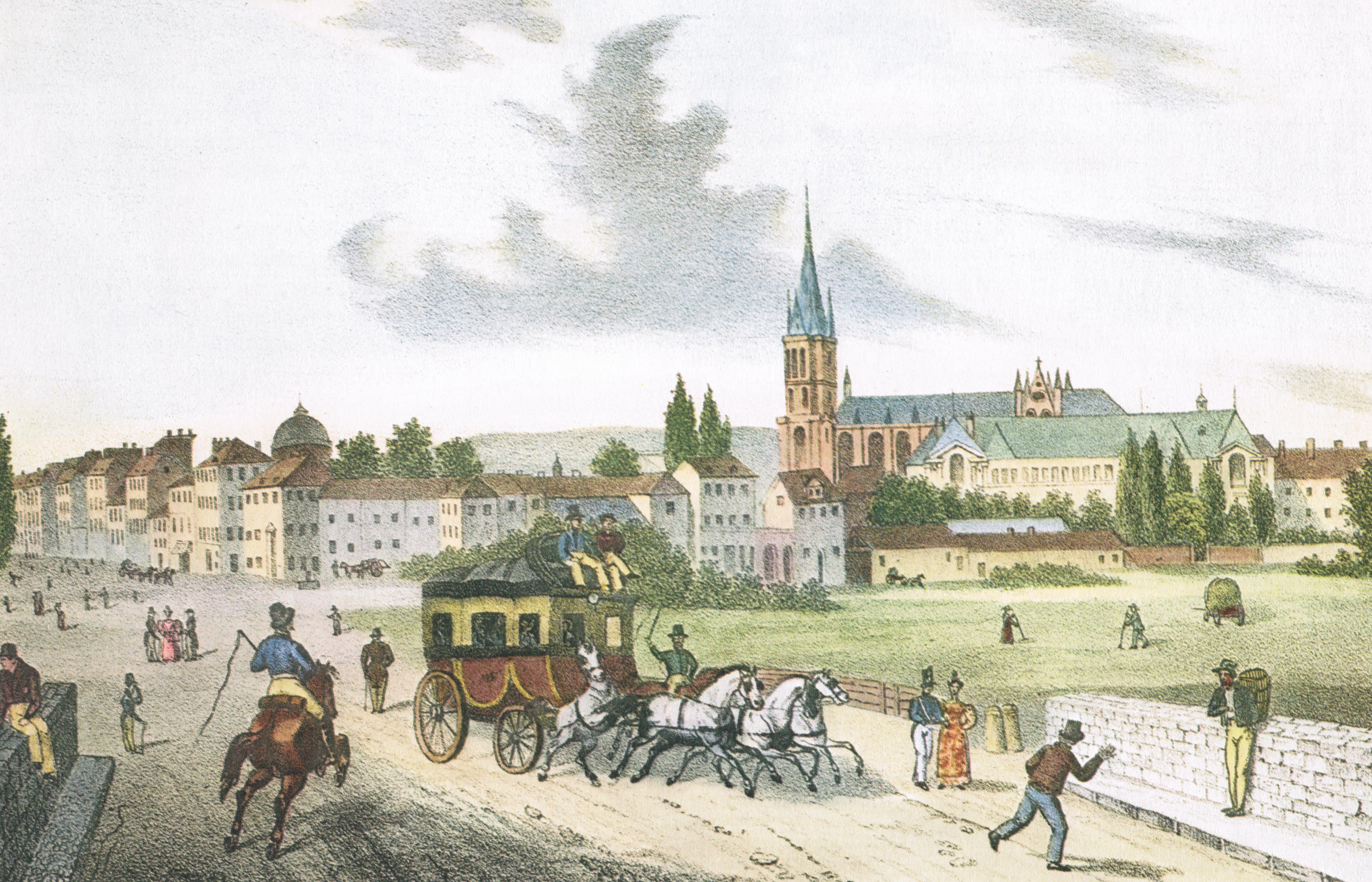
Saint-Denis in 1830

The last king to be interred in Saint-Denis was Louis XVIII (1755 – 1824). After France became a republic and an empire, Saint-Denis lost its association with royalty.

On 1 January 1860, the city of Paris was enlarged by annexing neighbouring communes. On that occasion, the commune of La Chapelle-Saint-Denis was disbanded and divided between the city of Paris, Saint-Denis, Saint-Ouen, and Aubervilliers. Saint-Denis received the north-western part of La Chapelle-Saint-Denis.

During the 19th century, Saint-Denis became increasingly industrialised. Transport was much improved: in 1824 the Canal Saint-Denis was constructed, linking the Canal de l'Ourcq in the northeast of Paris to the River Seine at the level of L'Île-Saint-Denis, and in 1843 the first railway reached Saint-Denis. By the end of the century, there were 80 factories in Saint-Denis.

The presence of so many industries also gave rise to an important socialist movement. In 1892, Saint-Denis elected its first socialist administration, and by the 1920s, the city had acquired the nickname of la ville rouge, the red city. Until Jacques Doriot in 1934, all mayors of Saint-Denis were members of the Communist Party.

During the Second World War, after the defeat of France, Saint-Denis was occupied by the Germans on 13 June 1940. There were several acts of sabotage and strikes, most notably on 14 April 1942 at the Hotchkiss factory. After an insurgency which started on 18 August 1944, Saint-Denis was liberated by the 2nd Armored Division (France) on 27 August 1944.

After the war, the economic crisis of the 1970s and 1980s hit the city, which was strongly dependent on its heavy industry.

During the 1990s, however, the city started to grow again. The 1998 FIFA World Cup provided an enormous impulse; the main stadium for the tournament, the Stade de France, was built in Saint-Denis, along with many infrastructural improvements, such as the extension of the metro to Saint-Denis-Université. The stadium is used by the national football and rugby teams for friendly matches. The Coupe de France, Coupe de la Ligue and Top 14 final matches are held there, as well as the Meeting Areva international athletics event.

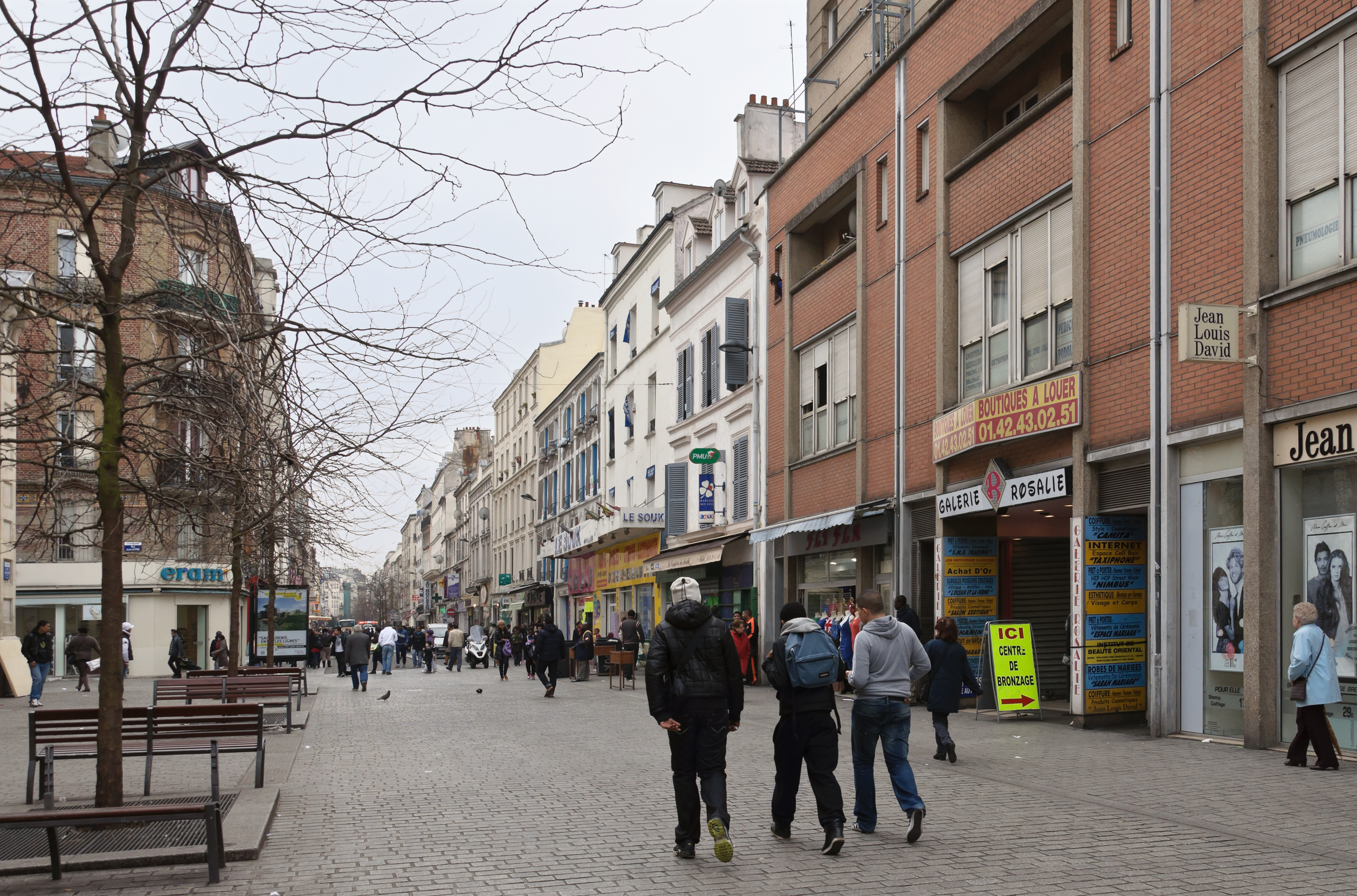
Rue Gabriel Péri, a pedestrian zone in Saint-Denis, in 2012

Since 2000, Saint-Denis has worked with seven neighbouring communes (Aubervilliers, Villetaneuse, Pierrefitte-sur-Seine, Épinay-sur-Seine, L'Île-Saint-Denis (since 2003), Stains (since 2003), and La Courneuve (since 2005)) in Plaine Commune.

In 2003, together with Paris, Saint-Denis hosted the second European Social Forum.

On 13–14 November 2015, Saint-Denis was the main location of a series of mass shootings and hostage-takings just outside the Stade de France. On 18 November, a major follow-up raid occurred. Several suspects were killed, including alleged mastermind Abdelhamid Abaaoud.

In 2016, Saint-Denis was one of the host cities of the UEFA European Football Championships, including the opening game.

=== Heraldry ===
- Motto: Saint Denys Montjoie!
- The coat of arms are described in Old French by the phrase: Azure semé de lys Or (also known as France ancien).
Arms of Saint-Denis

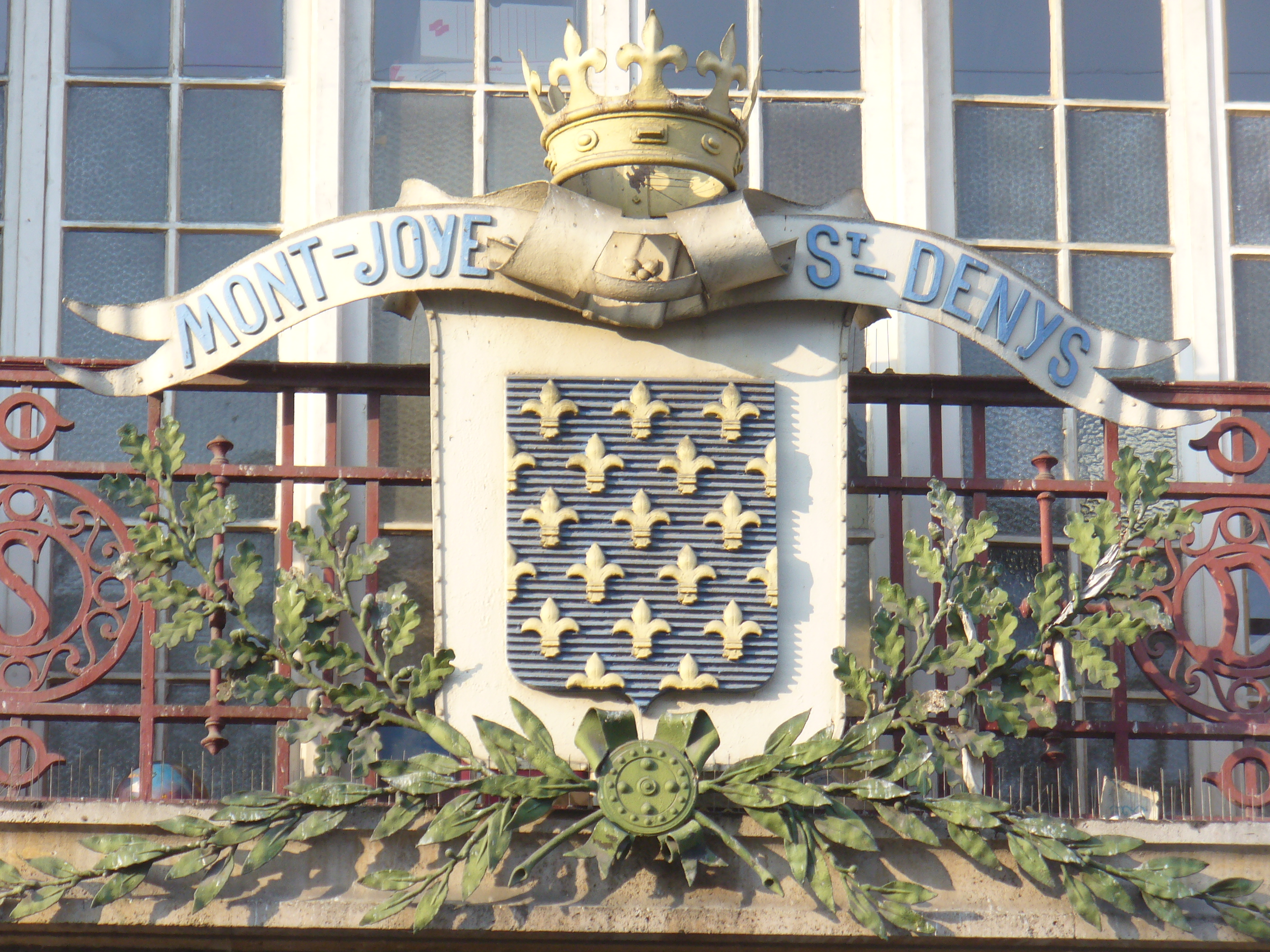
Arms on the front of the post office, rue de la République

== Population ==
Inhabitants of Saint-Denis are called Dionysiens in French. The population data in the table below refer to the commune of Saint-Denis proper, in its geography at the given years. The 2023 data below do not include Pierrefitte-sur-Seine, absorbed in 2025.

Historical population

Year	Pop.	±% p.a.
1793	5,642	—
1800	3,955	−4.95%
1806	3,892	−0.27%
1821	5,569	+2.42%
1831	9,618	+5.62%
1836	9,332	−0.60%
1841	10,338	+2.07%
1846	10,597	+0.50%
1851	13,688	+5.25%
1856	15,930	+3.08%
1861	22,052	+6.72%
1866	26,117	+3.44%
1872	31,983	+3.43%
1876	34,908	+2.21%
1881	43,895	+4.69%
1886	48,009	+1.81%
1891	50,992	+1.21%
1896	54,432	+1.31%
1901	60,808	+2.24%

Year	Pop.	±% p.a.
1906	64,790	+1.28%
1911	71,759	+2.06%
1921	76,358	+0.62%
1926	79,872	+0.90%
1931	82,412	+0.63%
1936	78,401	−0.99%
1946	69,939	−1.14%
1954	80,705	+1.81%
1962	94,264	+1.96%
1968	99,268	+0.87%
1975	96,132	−0.46%
1982	90,829	−0.81%
1990	89,988	−0.12%
1999	85,832	−0.52%
2007	100,800	+2.03%
2012	108,274	+1.44%
2017	111,135	+0.52%
2023	115,513	+0.65%

Source: EHESS and INSEE (1968–2017)

=== Immigration ===
Place of birth of residents of Saint-Denis in 1999
Born in metropolitan France	Born outside metropolitan France			
64.4%	35.6%			
64.4%	Born in overseas France	Born in foreign countries with French citizenship at birth^{1}	EU-15 immigrants^{2}	Non-EU-15 immigrants
64.4%	4.3%	2.5%	5.5%	23.3%
^{1} This group is made up largely of former French settlers, such as pieds-noirs in Northwest Africa, followed by former colonial citizens who had French citizenship at birth (such as was often the case for the native elite in French colonies), as well as to a lesser extent foreign-born children of French expatriates. A foreign country is understood as a country not part of France in 1999, so a person born for example in 1950 in Algeria, when Algeria was an integral part of France, is nonetheless listed as a person born in a foreign country in French statistics.^{2} An immigrant is a person born in a foreign country not having French citizenship at birth. An immigrant may have acquired French citizenship since moving to France, but is still considered an immigrant in French statistics. On the other hand, persons born in France with foreign citizenship (the children of immigrants) are not listed as immigrants.

==== Maghrebians ====
As of 2008, 18.1% of the population of Saint-Denis was Maghrebian. Melissa K. Brynes, author of French Like Us? Municipal Policies and North African Migrants in the Parisian Banlieues, 1945–1975, wrote that in the middle of the 20th century, "few of [the Paris-area communes with North African populations] were as engaged with their migrant communities as the Dionysiens."

== Transport ==
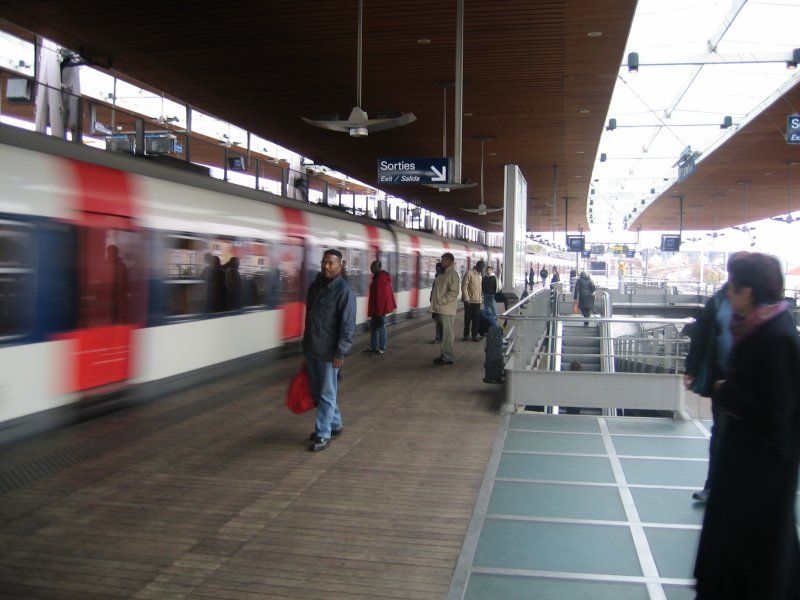
RER B at La Plaine - Stade de France

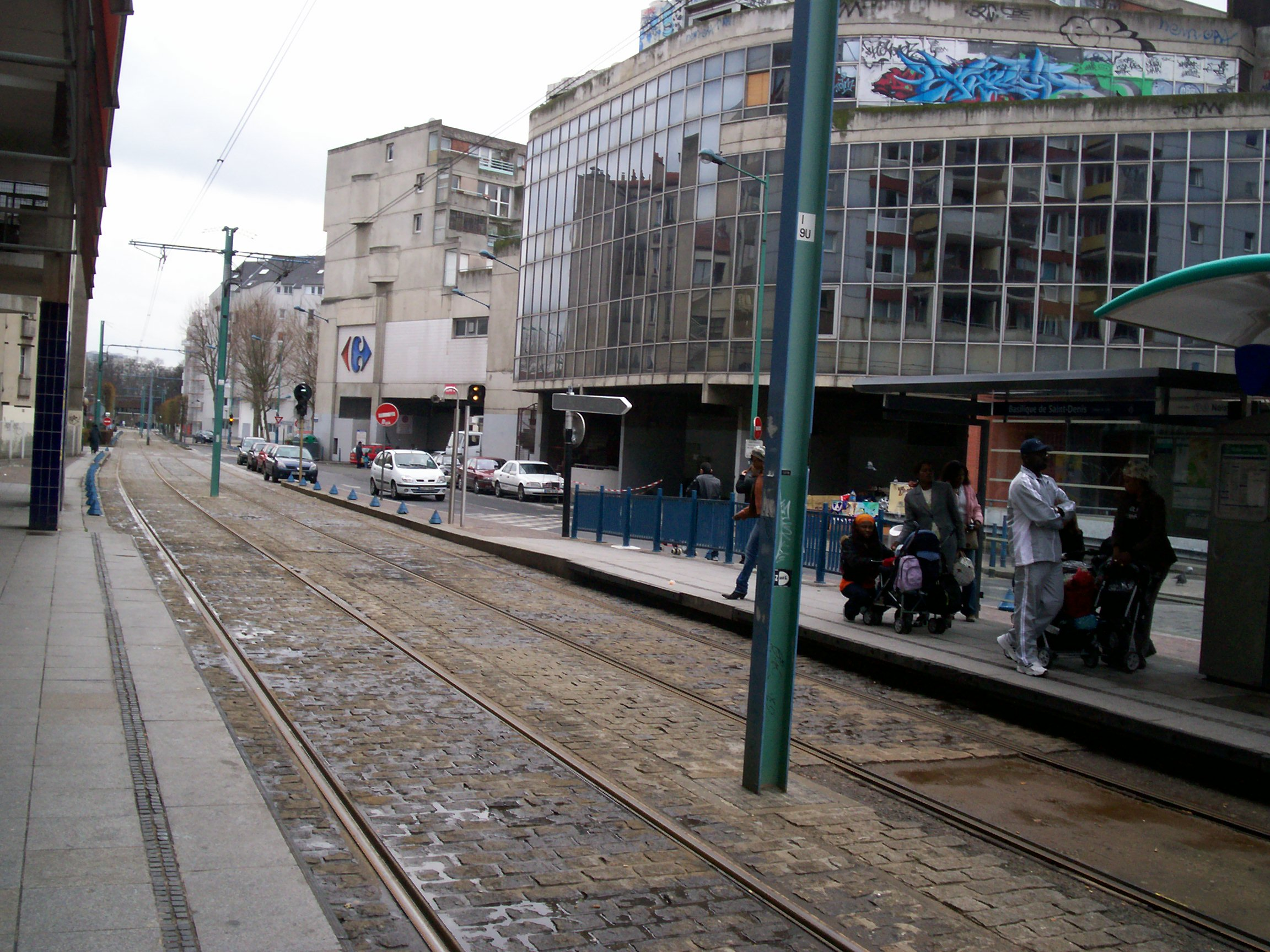
Street view of Saint-Denis along Île-de-France tramway Line 1

Saint-Denis is served by Metro, RER, tram, and Transilien connections. The Saint-Denis rail station, built in 1846, was formerly the only one in Saint-Denis, but today serves as an interchange station for the Transilien Paris – Nord (Line H) suburban rail line and RER line D. The French rail company SNCF is also based in the town.

Paris Métro Line 12:

- Front Populaire

Paris Métro Line 13:

- Carrefour Pleyel
- Saint-Denis - Porte de Paris (closest Metro station to the Stade de France)
- Basilique de Saint-Denis (in the centre of town, near the Saint Denis Basilica)
- Saint-Denis – Université

Paris Métro Line 14

- Saint-Denis Pleyel

Tramways in Île-de-France:

- T1: Asnières-Gennevilliers – Noisy-le-Sec:
- T5: Saint-Denis – Garges-Sarcelles
- T8: Saint-Denis – Épinay-sur-Seine / Villetaneuse

Regional Rail:

- La Plaine – Stade de France: RER line B
- Stade de France – Saint-Denis: RER line D
- Saint-Denis:
  - Transilien Paris – Nord (Line H) suburban rail line.
  - RER Line D

== Crime ==
Saint-Denis has a comparatively higher crime rate than most surrounding communes, with higher rates of robbery, drugs offences and murder.

In 2010 Saint-Denis had the highest rate of violent crime in France with 1,899 violent robberies and 1,031 assaults (an average of six robberies and three assaults per day)

To fight insecurity and delinquency, the Minister of Public Safety Jean-Marc Ayrault increased national police force in the Basilica district and the Landy Nord, classifying them as a Priority Security Zone 'ZSP' since 2012.

In 2014, a total of 14,437 crimes were reported for 110,000 inhabitants.

Saint-Denis made international headlines for violent disorder before and after the 2022 UEFA Champions League Final, in which fans of visiting football team Liverpool F.C. were attacked by police before the game and by groups of local youths after the game, with the chaos becoming an issue in the 2022 French legislative election.

== Education ==
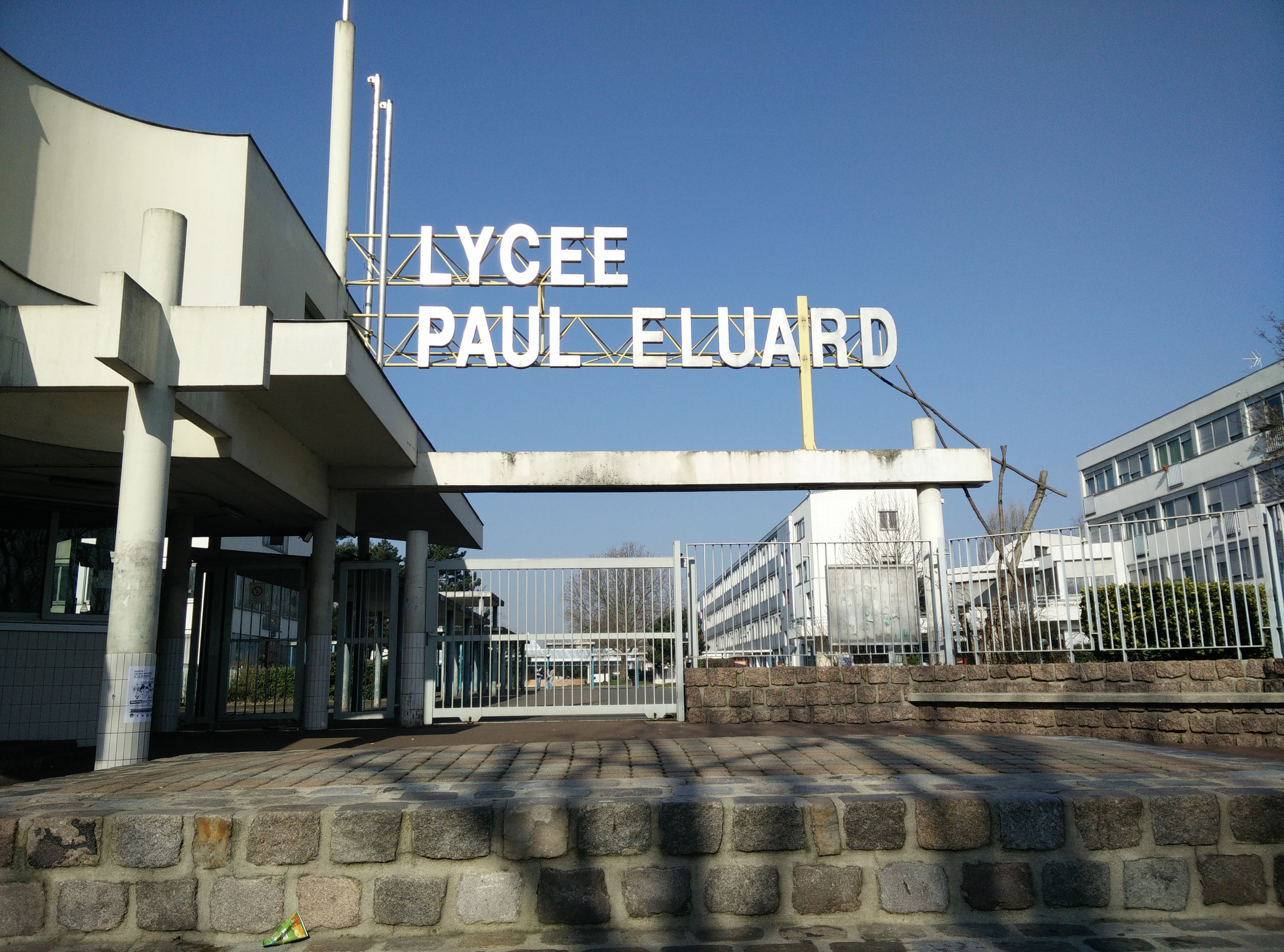
Lycée Paul Éluard

Saint-Denis has 29 public preschools/nursery schools (écoles maternelles). Saint-Denis has 30 public elementary schools (écoles élémentaires), with one of those schools (École Élémentaire Maria Casarès) being an intercommunal school. Saint-Denis has eight public junior high schools (collèges). Saint-Denis has the following senior high schools/sixth-form colleges: Lycée Bartholdi, Lycée Paul Éluard, Lycée Suger, and Lycée d'application de l'E.N.N.A.

Saint-Denis has one private elementary, middle, and high school (Ensemble Scolaire Jean-Baptiste de la Salle-Notre Dame de la Compassion) and one private middle and high school (Collège et lycée Saint-Vincent-de-Paul).

== Notable people ==
- Nakibou Aboubakari, footballer
- Sami Ameziane, humourist (Comte de Bouderbala)
- Jean-Christophe Bahebeck, footballer
- Paule Baudouin, handball player
- Vincent Belorgey, DJ
- Maurice Beyina, basketball player
- Thievy Bifouma, footballer
- Ernest Cadine, athlete
- Franck Chantalou, karateka
- Vincent Clarico, athlete
- Angelo Debarre, musician
- Pierre Degeyter, composer
- Charles Dezobry, author
- Paul Éluard, poet
- Auguste Gillot, mayor
- Jean-Marc Grava, athlete
- Auriol Guillaume, footballer
- Abdelaziz Kamara, footballer
- Jonathan Kodjia, footballer
- Moussa Koita, footballer
- Albert Lebourg, painter
- L.E.J, musical trio
- Loic Lumbilla, footballer
- Rosere Manguelle, footballer
- Pierre Michelot, bassist
- Claude Monet, painter
- Louis-Gabriel Moreau, painter
- Astride N'Gouan, handball player
- Rodrigue Nordin, athlete
- Sabrina Ouazani, actress
- Francisque Poulbot, illustrator
- Barbara Pravi, singer-songwriter
- Michael Raffaelli, painter
- Soukeina Sagna, handball player
- Yannis Salibur, footballer
- Kool Shen, rapper (Suprême NTM)
- Paul Signac, painter
- William Soliman, basketball player
- Joey Starr, rapper (Suprême NTM)
- Brahim Thiam, footballer
- Alassane Touré, footballer
- Alioune Touré, footballer
- Maurice Utrillo, painter
- Anne Vernon, actress
- Sofiane Zermani, musician

== Points of interest ==
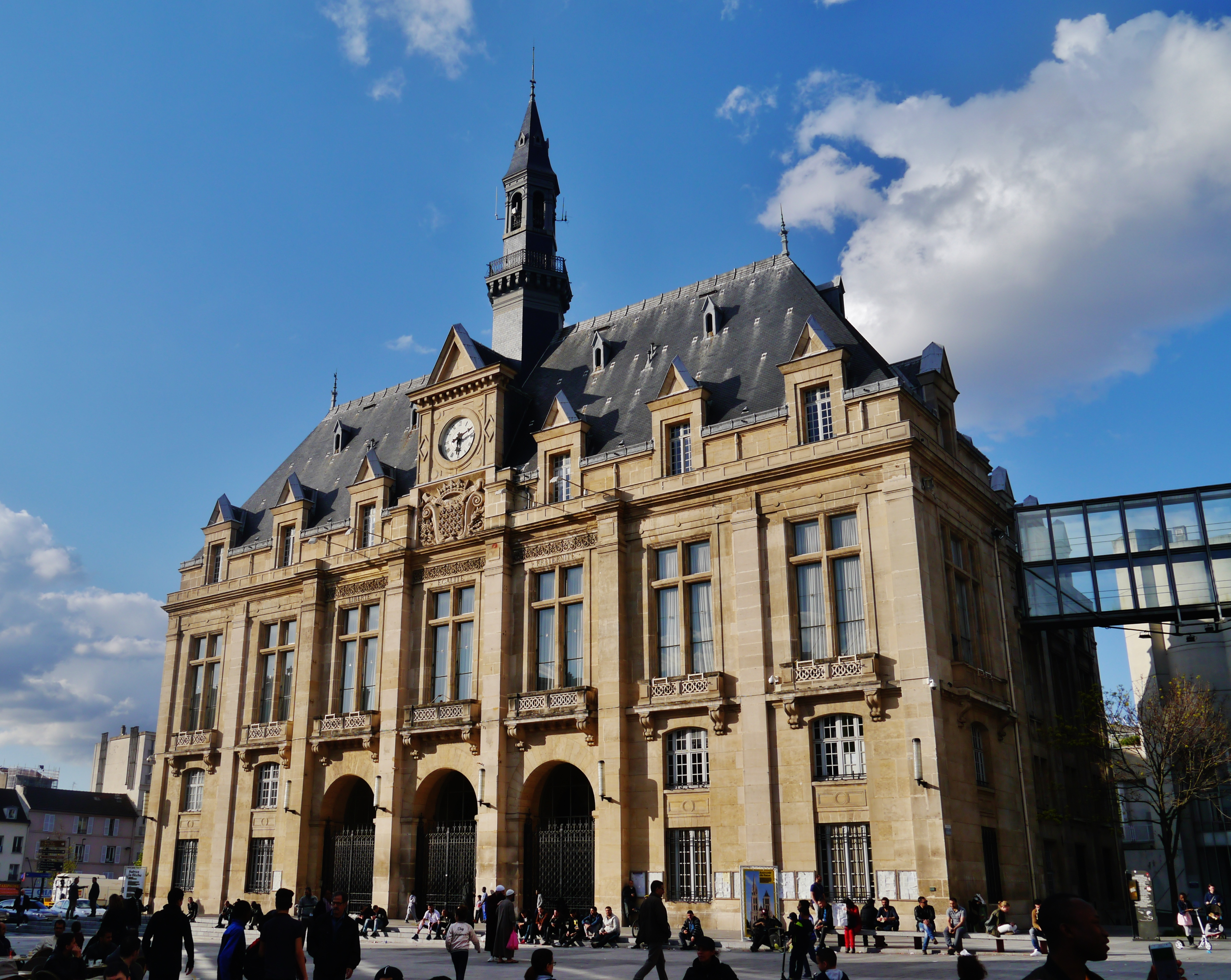
The Hôtel de Ville

- Basilica of Saint-Denis, a 12th-century church, burial place of kings of France
- Stade de France, the national stadium of France
- Cité du Cinéma, film studios founded by Luc Besson.
- The Hôtel de Ville, completed in 1883

== Twin towns – sister cities ==
Saint-Denis is twinned with:

- Córdoba, Andalusia, Spain
- Gera, Thuringia, Germany
- Tiznit, Morocco
- Coatbridge, North Lanarkshire, Scotland, United Kingdom
- Guarulhos, São Paulo, Brazil
- Sesto San Giovanni, Lombardy, Italy
- Tuzla, Bosnia and Herzegovina
- Nazareth, Israel

== In popular culture ==
The 2018 video game Red Dead Redemption 2 features a major city named Saint Denis, located in the fictional American state of Lemoyne. The fictional city was based on New Orleans, and both share a history of being former French territories.

In the 2014 video game 'Assassin's Creed: Unity,' the downloadable content (DLC) titled 'Dead Kings' is set in the town of Saint-Denis, referred to as 'Franciade' in the game. The storyline takes place during the French Revolution and explores the crypts and secrets of Saint-Denis, incorporating its historical and cultural essence into the game.

== See also ==
- Banlieue
