= Pierrefitte-sur-Seine =

- Part of Saint-Denis
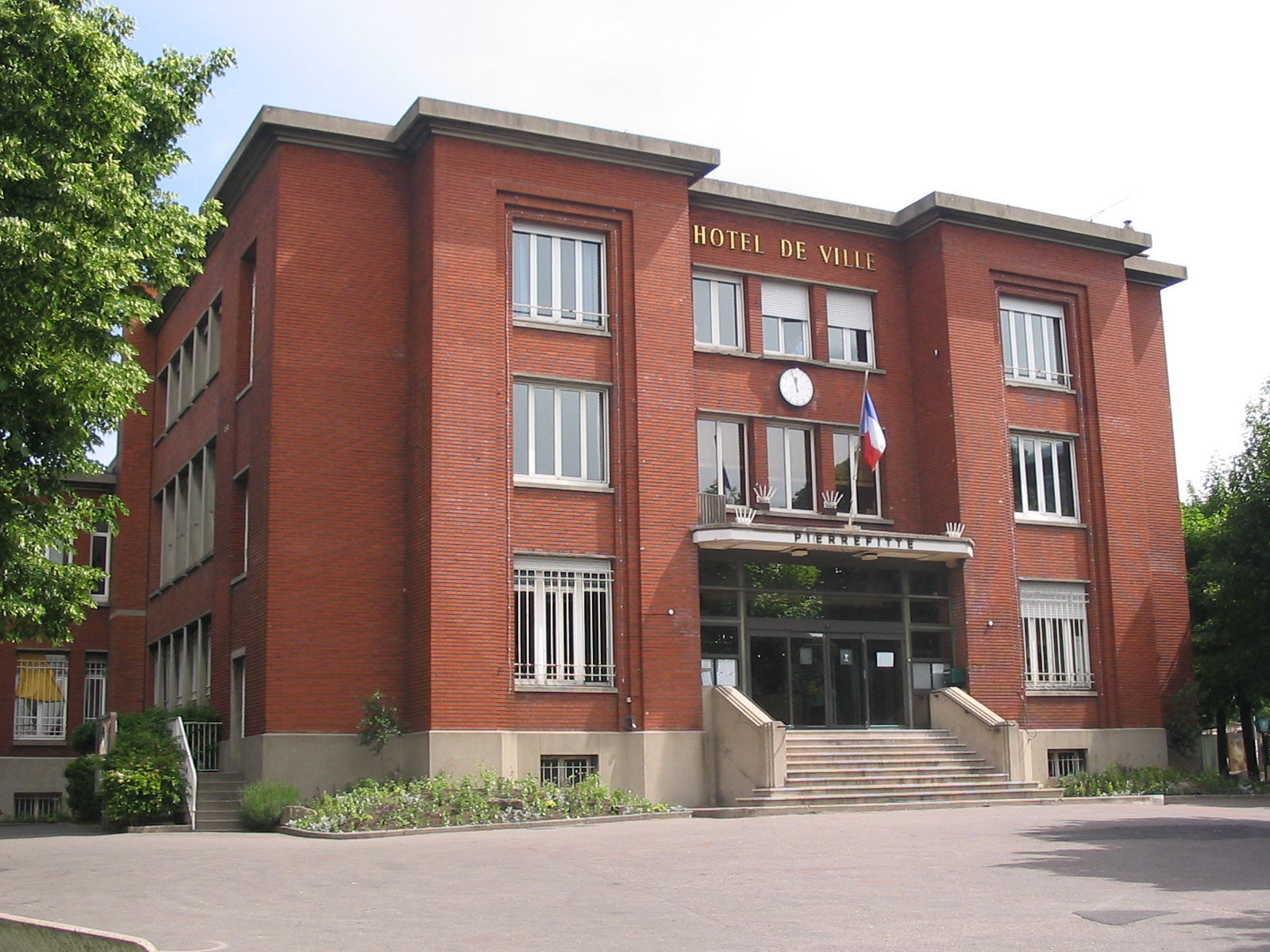
- The Hôtel de Ville

- Coat of arms

- Location (in red) within Paris inner suburbs
- Location of Pierrefitte-sur-Seine
- Location within France Location within Île-de-France (region)
- Coordinates: 48°57′56″N 2°21′41″E
- Country: France
- Region: Île-de-France
- Department: Seine-Saint-Denis
- Arrondissement: Saint-Denis
- Canton: Épinay-sur-Seine
- Commune: Saint-Denis
- Area^{1}: 3.41 km^{2} (1.32 sq mi)
- Highest elevation: 97 m (318 ft)
- Lowest elevation: 37 m (121 ft)
- Population (2022): 33,670
  - Density: 9,870/km^{2} (25,600/sq mi)
- Time zone: UTC+01:00 (CET)
  - Summer (DST): UTC+02:00 (CEST)
- Postal code: 93200
- ^{1} French Land Register data, which excludes lakes, ponds, glaciers > 1 km^{2} (0.386 sq mi or 247 acres) and river estuaries.

Pierrefitte-sur-Seine (French pronunciation: [pjɛʁfit syʁ sɛn], lit. 'Pierrefitte on Seine') is a former commune in the Seine-Saint-Denis department and Île-de-France region of France. Since January 2025 it is a part of Saint-Denis, following a vote of both municipal councils on 30 May 2024. It forms part of the northern suburbs of Paris, and lies 12.4 km (7.7 mi) from the centre of the French capital.

== Heraldry ==
Arms of Pierrefitte-sur-Seine	The arms of Pierrefitte-sur-Seine are blazoned: Gules, 3 rocks argent, perched on the center one a finch Or, on a chief azur a nail argent between 2 fleurs de lis Or.

== Toponymy ==
The name Pierrefitte probably derives from the Latin petra ficta, meaning 'fixed stone', probably referring to a standing stone.

== History ==
The Hôtel de Ville was completed in 1935.

In December 2005, Pierrefitte became Europe's first "Mediation Town".

== Population ==
Historical population

Year	Pop.	±% p.a.
1793	750	—
1800	706	−0.86%
1806	734	+0.65%
1821	705	−0.27%
1831	812	+1.42%
1836	789	−0.57%
1841	827	+0.95%
1846	813	−0.34%
1851	808	−0.12%
1856	829	+0.51%
1861	915	+1.99%
1866	1,075	+3.28%
1872	1,157	+1.23%
1876	1,151	−0.13%
1881	1,346	+3.18%
1886	1,609	+3.63%
1891	1,824	+2.54%
1896	2,468	+6.23%

Year	Pop.	±% p.a.
1901	2,863	+3.01%
1906	3,349	+3.19%
1911	4,268	+4.97%
1921	5,987	+3.44%
1926	8,609	+7.53%
1931	11,645	+6.23%
1936	12,575	+1.55%
1946	12,100	−0.38%
1954	12,867	+0.77%
1962	14,770	+1.74%
1968	19,017	+4.30%
1975	20,819	+1.30%
1982	22,366	+1.03%
1990	23,822	+0.79%
1999	25,816	+0.90%
2007	28,338	+1.17%
2012	27,925	−0.29%
2017	30,306	+1.65%

Source: EHESS and INSEE (1968-2017)

== Transport ==
The town is served by Pierrefitte – Stains railway station on line D of the RER regional suburban rail network.

The south of the commune, where the National Archives of France relocated in 2013, is also served by Saint-Denis – Université station on Paris Métro Line 13. This station lies on the border between the communes of Pierrefitte-sur-Seine and Saint-Denis.

== Education ==
Primary and secondary schools in the commune included:

- Nine preschools (maternelles)
- Eight elementary schools
- Two junior high schools: Collège Gustave-Courbet and Collège Pablo-Neruda

Collège intercommunal Lucie-Aubrac in Villetaneuse also served Pierrefitte students, as did Lycée Polyvalent Maurice-Utrillo, a senior high school/sixth-form college in Stains.

Paris 8 University and Paris 13 University served area students.

== In the arts ==
Pierrefitte was where comedian and filmmaker Kheiron was raised, and the setting for his award-winning film All Three of Us.

== Personalities ==
- The actor and playwright Frédérick Lemaître lived in Pierrefitte between 1830 and 1845.
- The naturalist Alcide d'Orbigny died in Pierrefitte in 1857 and is buried in the municipal cemetery.

== Twin towns ==
Pierrefitte is twinned with

- Braintree in the United Kingdom
- Rüdersdorf bei Berlin in Germany.

== See also ==
- Communes of the Seine-Saint-Denis department
