= Canton of Saint-Denis-2 =

Canton of Saint-Denis-2 may refer to 2 administrative divisions in France:

- Canton of Saint-Denis-2, Seine-Saint-Denis, in Seine-Saint-Denis department, Île-de-France
- Canton of Saint-Denis-2, Réunion, in Réunion
