= Éluard (disambiguation) =

Paul Éluard was a 20th century French surrealist poet.

Éluard or Eluard may also refer to:

- Gala Éluard, the poet's first wife
- Nusch Éluard, the poet's second wife
- 15752 Eluard, a Solar system minor planet named after the poet

== See also ==
- Lycée Paul Éluard (disambiguation), the name of the several French schools
