= Hôtel de Ville, Pierrefitte-sur-Seine =

Town hall in Pierrefitte-sur-Seine, France

Hôtel de Ville
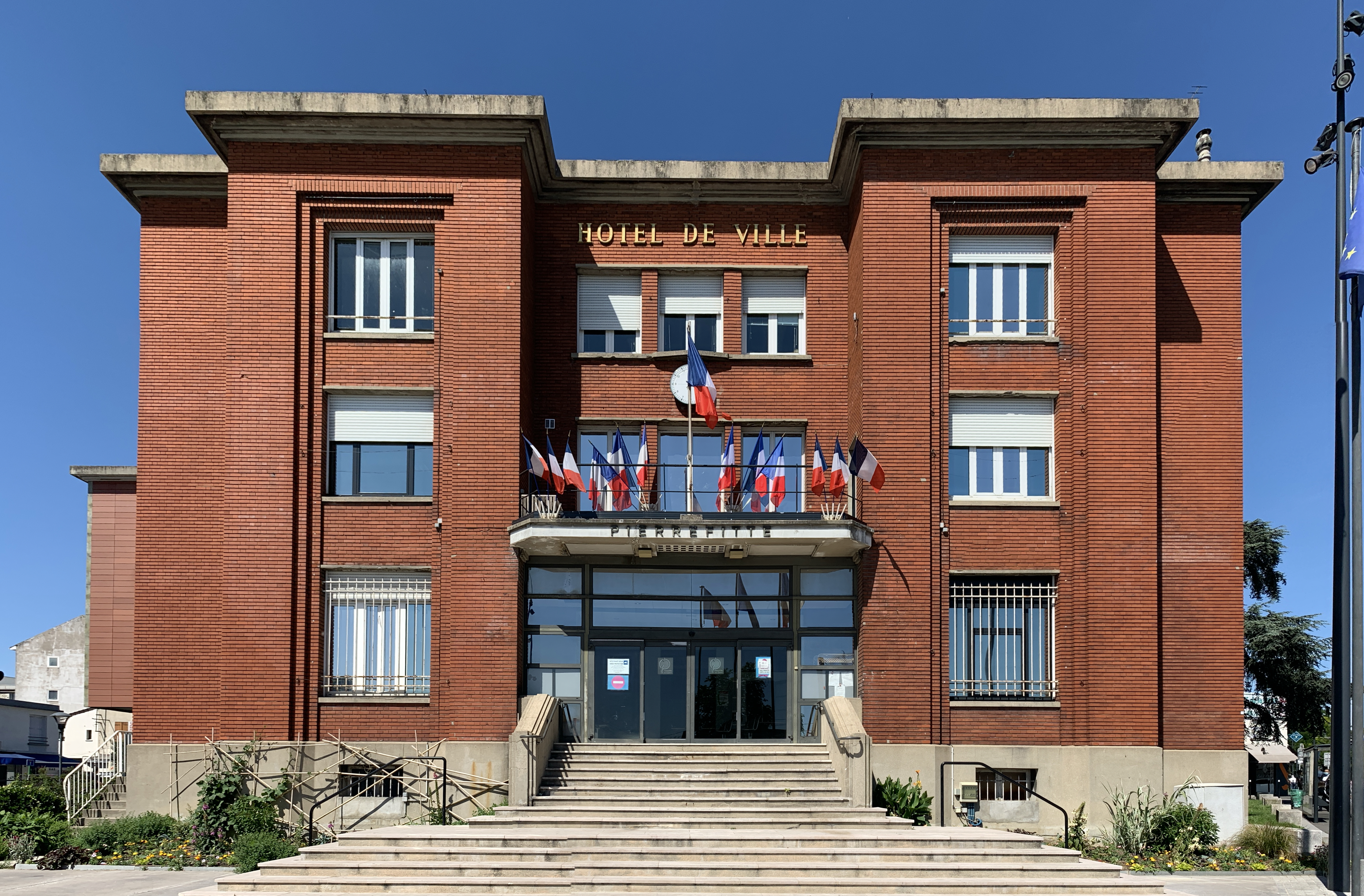
- The main frontage of the Hôtel de Ville in May 2020
- Interactive map of the Hôtel de Ville area

General information
- Type: City hall
- Architectural style: Neoclassical style
- Location: Pierrefitte-sur-Seine, France
- Coordinates: 48.9639°N 2.3602°E
- Completed: 1935

Design and construction
- Architect: Roger Vinet

The Hôtel de Ville (French pronunciation: [otɛl də vil], City Hall) is a municipal building in Pierrefitte-sur-Seine, Seine-Saint-Denis, in the northern suburbs of Paris, standing on Place de la Libération.

== History ==
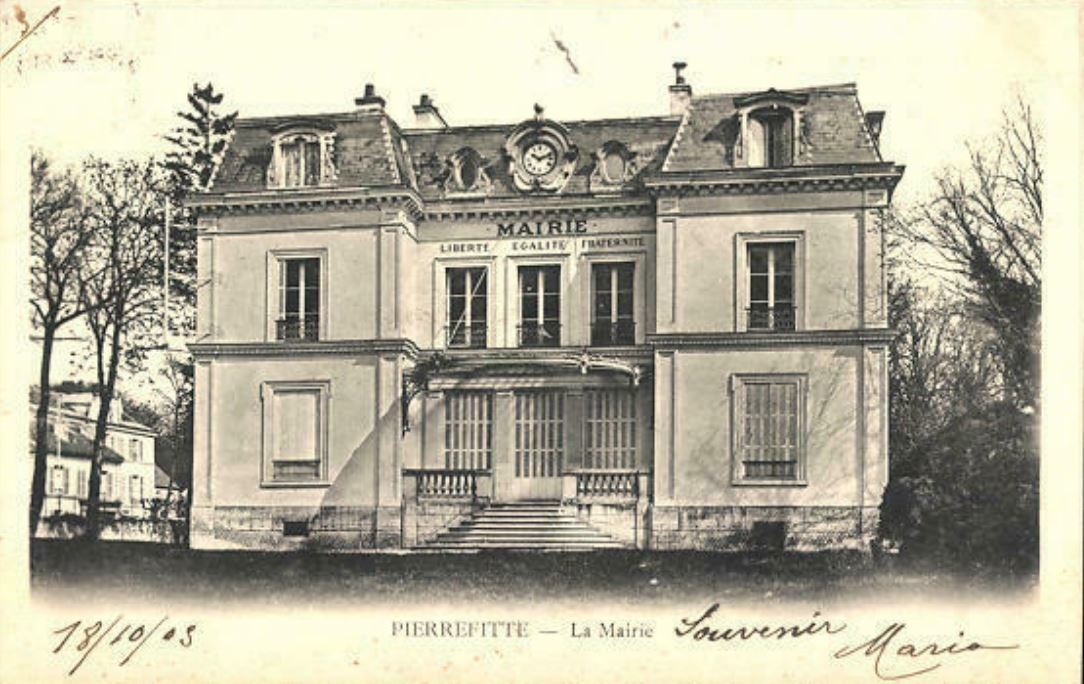
The current building before it was encased in terracotta tiling

Following the French Revolution, the town council initially met in the house of the mayor at the time. This arrangement continued until 1849, when the council led by the mayor, Louis Ange Lejeune, decided to erect a town hall on the corner of Rue de Paris and Rue Briais.

In the early 21st century, the council decided to acquire a more substantial building for municipal purposes. The building they selected, on the corner of Boulevard Jean-Mermoz and Rue de Paris, was a private residence which had been designed in the neoclassical style, built in ashlar stone and had been completed in 1856. The design involved a symmetrical main frontage of five bays facing onto Demi-Lune (now Place de la Libération) with the end bays projected forward. The central section of three bays featured a short flight of steps leading up to three square headed doorways separated by Doric order pilasters supporting an entablature. There were three casement windows with moulded surrounds on the first floor and, at roof level, there was a clock flanked by a pair of oculi. The outer bays were fenestrated by casement windows on the first two floors and by dormer windows at attic level. The whole structure was surmounted by a mansard roof.

Following receipt of a substantial bequest from a local philanthropist, Julie Potier, the council acquired the house in 1901. The building was encased in terracotta tiling to a design by the architect, Roger Vinet, creating its current distinctive appearance, in 1935.

During the Second World War, following numerous skirmishes between French and German troops, the town hall was seized by elements of the French Forces of the Interior on 20 August 1944. This was six days before the official liberation of the town by the French 2nd Armoured Division, commanded by General Philippe Leclerc, on 26 August 1944.

A programme of refurbishment works was undertaken to a design by Jean Letu and completed in 1966, and an extension was built to a design by Pascal Lamy and François Girard, so improving accessibility, and completed in 2010. A bronze statue on a granite pedestal entitled "Amour de Licornes" (Love of Unicorns) was created by the sculptor, Virgil Magherusan, and unveiled in front of the town hall in 2012. Magherusan had already carried out significant commissions in his role as sculptor to the French Army and the National Gendarmerie.
