= Rosère Manguélé =

French footballer (born 1985)

Personal information
- Date of birth: 22 May 1985 (age 41)
- Place of birth: Saint-Denis, France
- Height: 1.78 m (5 ft 10 in)
- Position: Midfielder

Youth career
- US Saint Denis
- 2000–2005: Châteauroux

Senior career*
Years	Team	Apps	(Gls)
2005–2006	Châteauroux	2	(0)
2006–2007	Paris Saint-Germain B	11	(0)
2007–2008	AFC Compiègne	9	(0)
2008–2011	FC Sète	18	(0)
2009–2010	→ Pacy Vallée-d'Eure (loan)	17	(0)
2010–2011	Évreux FC	14	(0)
2011–2012	Red Star	3	(0)
2012–2015	FC Chambly	69	(1)
2015–2017	L'Entente SSG	17	(0)
Total		160	(1)
- * Club domestic league appearances and goals

Rosère Manguélé (born 22 May 1985) is a French former professional footballer, who played as a midfielder, and chairman of amateur club US Persan 03.

== Career ==
Manguélé was born in Saint-Denis

Early in his career he played two games on the professional level in Ligue 2 for LB Châteauroux.

Manguélé was a player-manager at amateur club FC Chambly, which he helped through consecutive promotions from National 2 to National.

His younger brother Jean-Christophe Bahebeck played the 2013 FIFA U-20 World Cup in the Turkey.
