= Lycée Paul Éluard =

Lycée Paul Éluard may refer to the following French schools:

- Lycée Paul Éluard (Saint-Denis, Seine-Saint-Denis), Paris
- Lycée Paul Éluard (Saint-Junien) in Saint-Junien
