= Hôtel de Ville, Stains =

Town hall in Stains, France

Hôtel de Ville
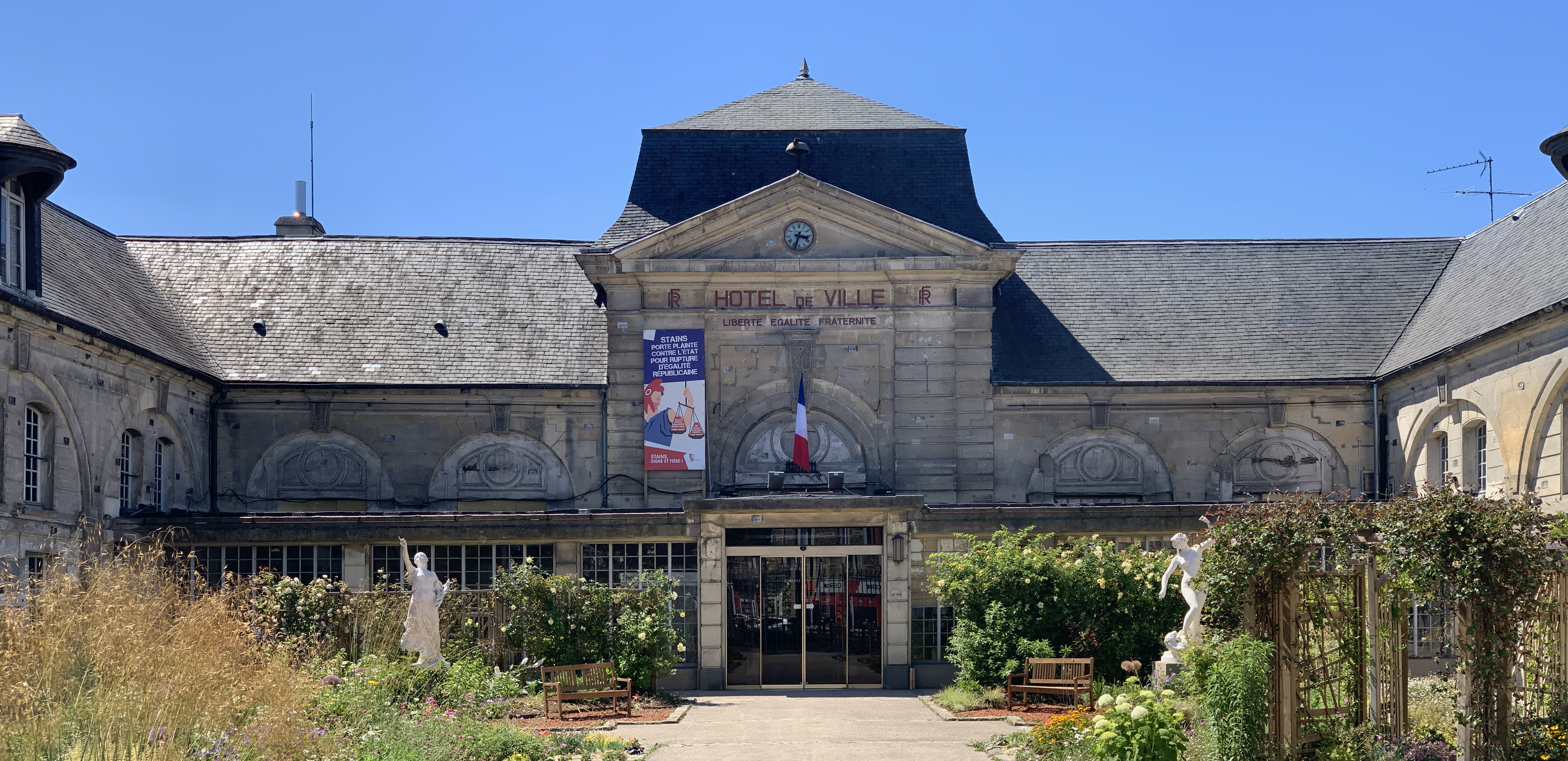
- The main frontage of the Hôtel de Ville in May 2020

General information
- Type: City hall
- Architectural style: Neoclassical style
- Location: Stains, France
- Coordinates: 48.9555°N 2.3823°E
- Completed: 1750

Design and construction
- Architect: Sieur Villebesseys

Monument historique
- Official name: Mairie
- Type: Inscrit
- Designated: 1928
- Reference no.: PA00079964

The Hôtel de Ville (French pronunciation: [otɛl də vil], City Hall) is a municipal building in Stains, Seine-Saint-Denis, in the northern outskirts of Paris, standing on Avenue Paul Vaillant Couturier. It was designated a monument historique by the French government in 1928.

== History ==
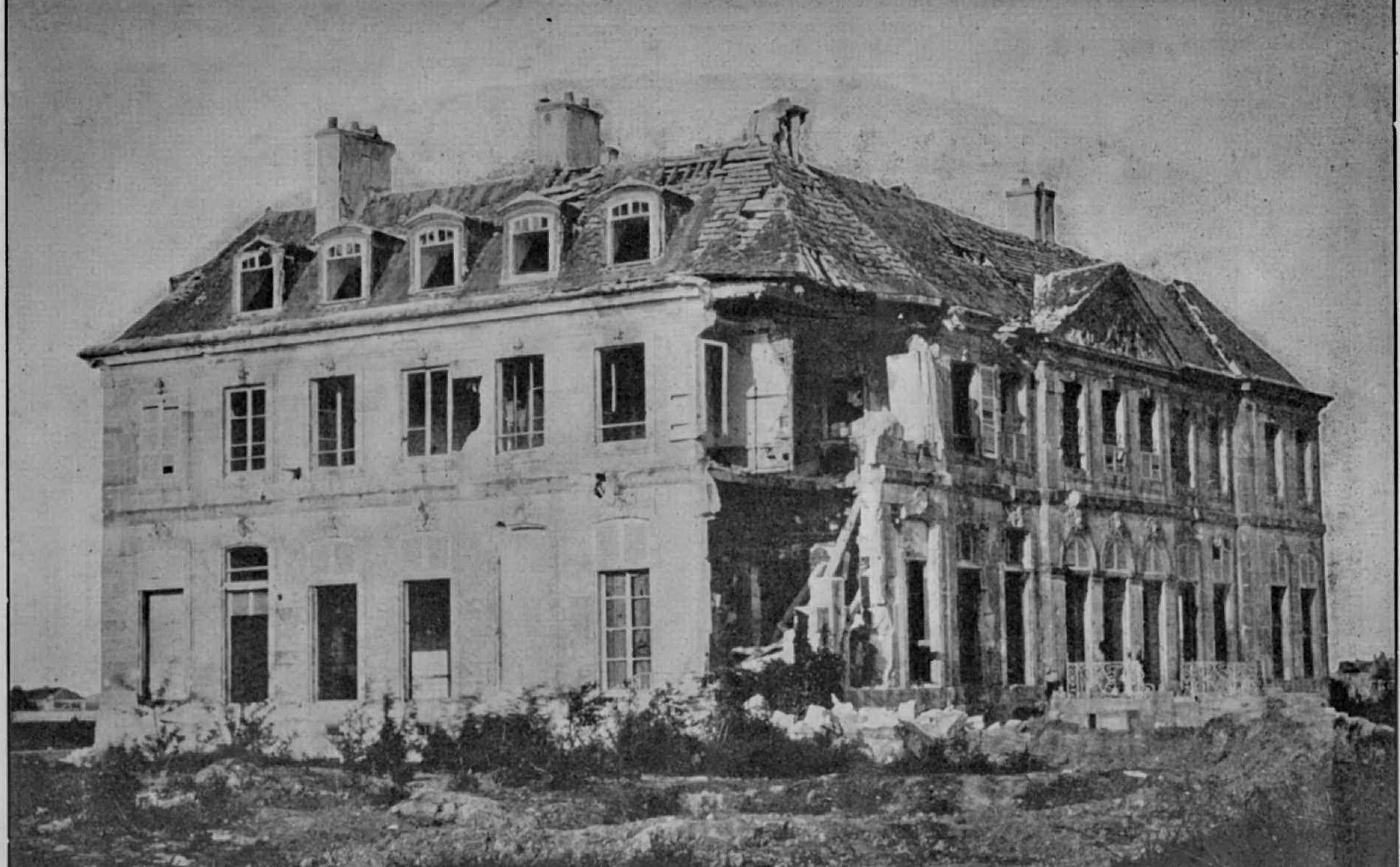
The Château of Stains after the destruction of 1870

The town hall was commissioned as the stable block of the Château of Stains. The estate was acquired by the diplomat Achille de Harlay in 1598. However, it subsequently remained undeveloped until the local seigneur, Toussaint Bellanger, decided to commission a château on the site. The château was designed by Armand Claude Mollet in the neoclassical style, built in ashlar stone and was completed in 1714. The stables were added on the east side of the estate in 1750.

The château was acquired by Pierre-Laurent Hainguerlot, for the use of Jérôme Bonaparte, in late 1813. It passed by inheritance to Hainguerlot's son-in-law, Alphée Bourdon de Vatry, in 1840. It was then destroyed by Prussian artillery, leaving only the stable block undamaged, during the Franco-Prussian War of 1870.

Following the French Revolution, the town council initially met at the home of the mayor at the time. This arrangement continued until 1831, when the council relocated to a building at the corner of Rue Carnot and Rue Marcel Cachin. After finding these premises cramped, the council decided to acquire the abandoned stables of the Château of Stains from the Bourdon de Vatry family in 1883. A major programme of works to convert the building for municipal use was subsequently carried out to a design by Sieur Villebesseys.

The building was laid out in a horseshoe shape around a courtyard. The main block, at the back of the courtyard, featured five large round headed openings. The central bay, which was slightly projected forward, was flanked by full-height banded pilasters supporting a pediment with a coat of arms in the tympanum and, behind the pediment, there was a châteauesque-style roof. Internally, the principal rooms, which were in the main block, were the Salle du Conseil (council chamber) and the Salle des Mariages (wedding room)

During the Paris insurrection, part of the Second World War, elements of the French Forces of the Interior seized the town hall on 19 August 1944 and raised a flag with the Cross of Lorraine over the building. This was six days before the official liberation of the town by the French 2nd Armoured Division, commanded by General Philippe Leclerc, on 25 August 1944.
