= Church of Our Lady of the Assumption, Stains =

Roman Catholic church in Seine-Saint-Denis, France

Church of Our Lady of the Assumption
- Église Notre-Dame-de-l'Assomption (French)
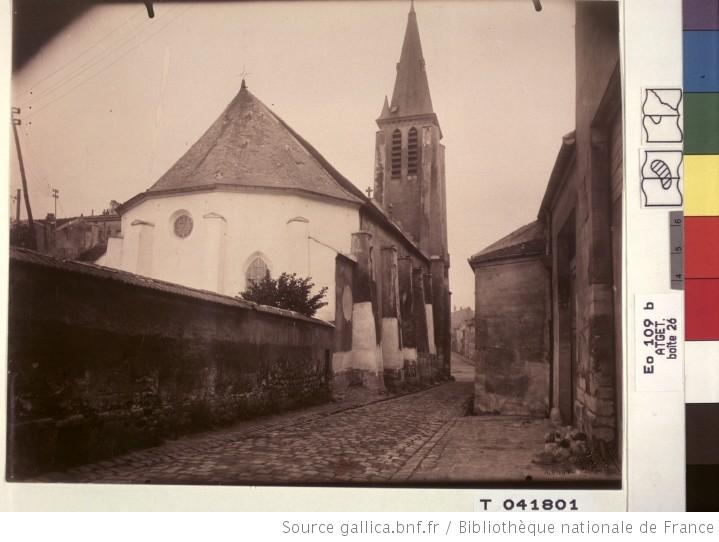
- 1901 photograph by Eugène Atget from Rue du Repos. At this time the bell tower was still standing

- Location within Paris and inner ring
- 48°57′25″N 2°22′56″E
- Type: Roman Catholic church
- Location: Stains, Seine-Saint-Denis, France

History
- Built: second half of the 16th century

Monument historique
- Official name: Eglise Notre-Dame-de-l'Assomption
- Criteria: Inscrit
- Designated: 4 May 1984
- Reference no.: PA00079963

The Church of Our Lady of the Assumption (French: Église Notre-Dame-de-l'Assomption) is a Roman Catholic church in Stains in the department of Seine-Saint-Denis, France. It is dedicated to the Assumption of the Virgin Mary and listed as a Historic Monument.

== Description ==
The parish was established by Bishop of Paris Pierre de Nemours in 1213. The current church was built in the second half of the 16th century on the site of a former church. It was consecrated by Bishop of Paris Eustache du Bellay on June 10, 1560. At that time, it was dedicated to Our Lady of the Assumption and to Saint Gemma.

The church was built with limestone from the region of Creil. This suggests the construction was made quickly in order to alleviate the lack of places of worship following the Hundred Years War. The vaults of the church were re-built after the bombings of the Franco-Prussian War. The bell tower was knocked down in 1950.

The church was listed as a Historic Monument in 1984.

The church was closed in 1995 for archaeological excavations to start. The renovation works started in May 2012 lasted two years.

== Interior ==
The main altar and the altarpiece of the church were listed as Historic Monument objects. The stone altarpiece and the sculpted tabernacle date back to the second half of the 17th century.

In 1929, two glass walls made by the Ateliers Lorin of Chartres led by Charles Lorin were added to the church. The first one shows the Adoration of the Magi and of the Shepherds, while the second one represents the Annunciation of the Virgin Mary.

== In arts ==
The church of Our Lady of the Assumption was shown in Maurice Utrillo's painting Eglise de Stains around 1930. The painting is preserved at Galerie Pétridès.

== Gallery ==
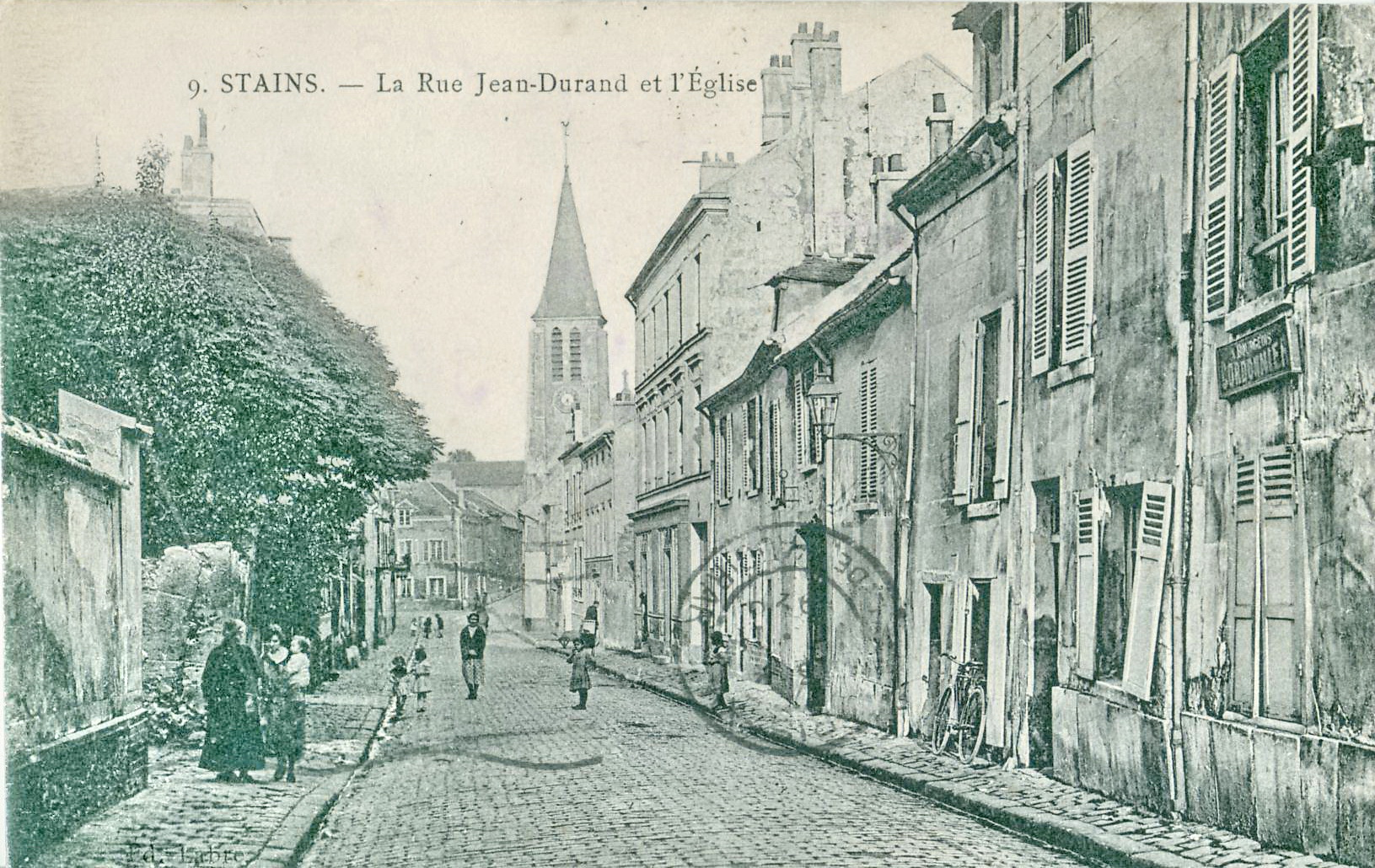
Rue Jean-Durand and the Church of Our Lady of the Assumption

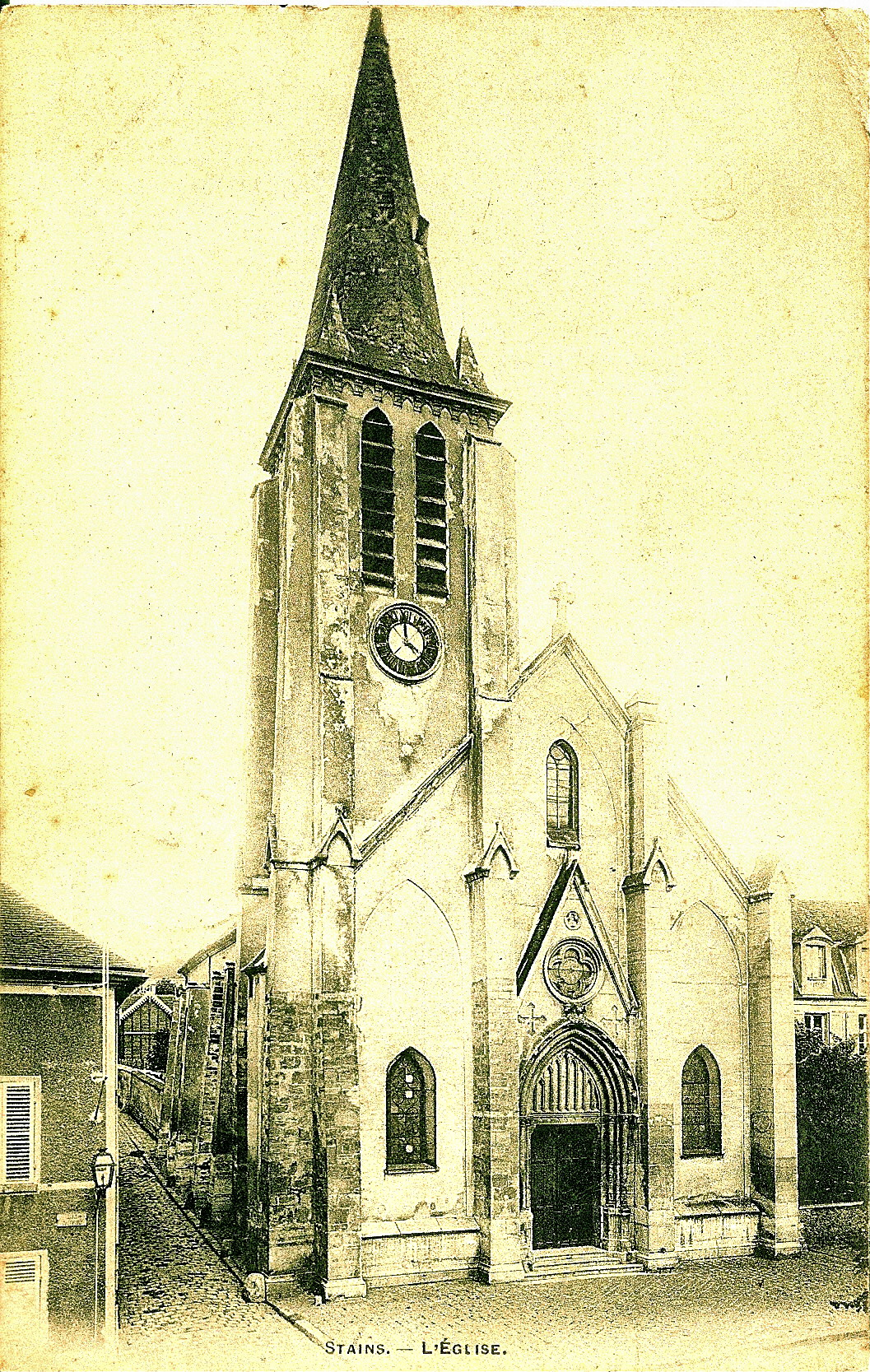
The Church of Our Lady of the Assumption on a postcard franked in 1903

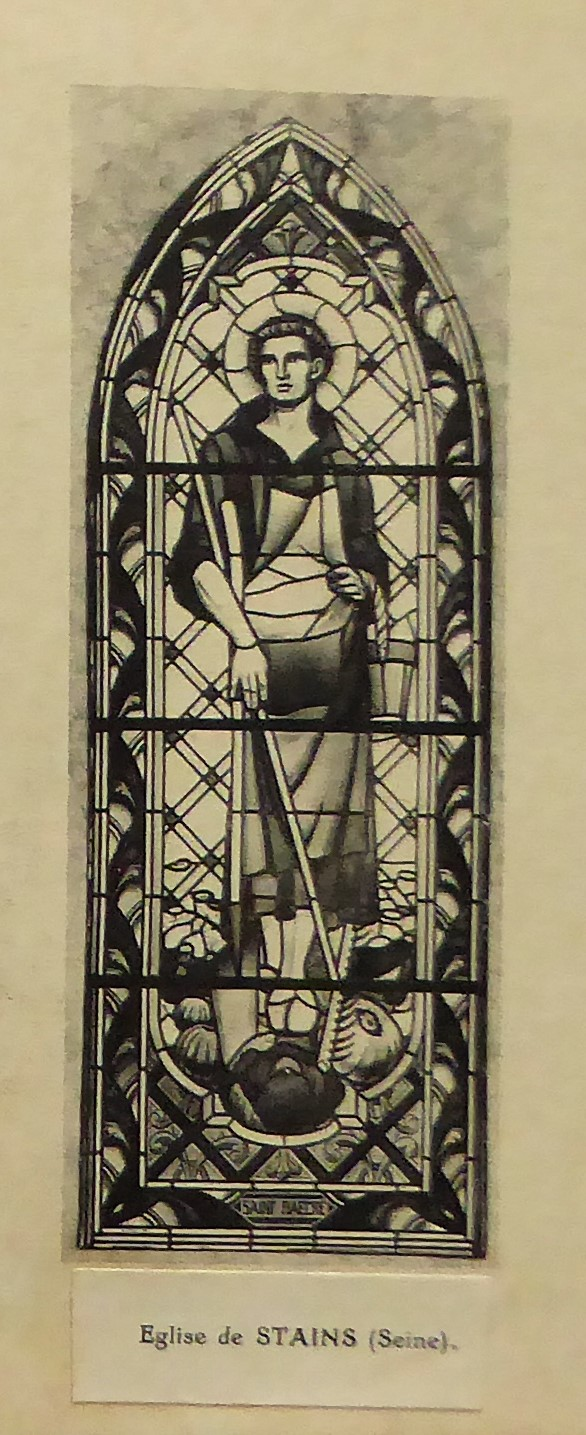
A stained glass in Charles Lorin's catalogue
