= Stains, Seine-Saint-Denis =

Stains
- Commune
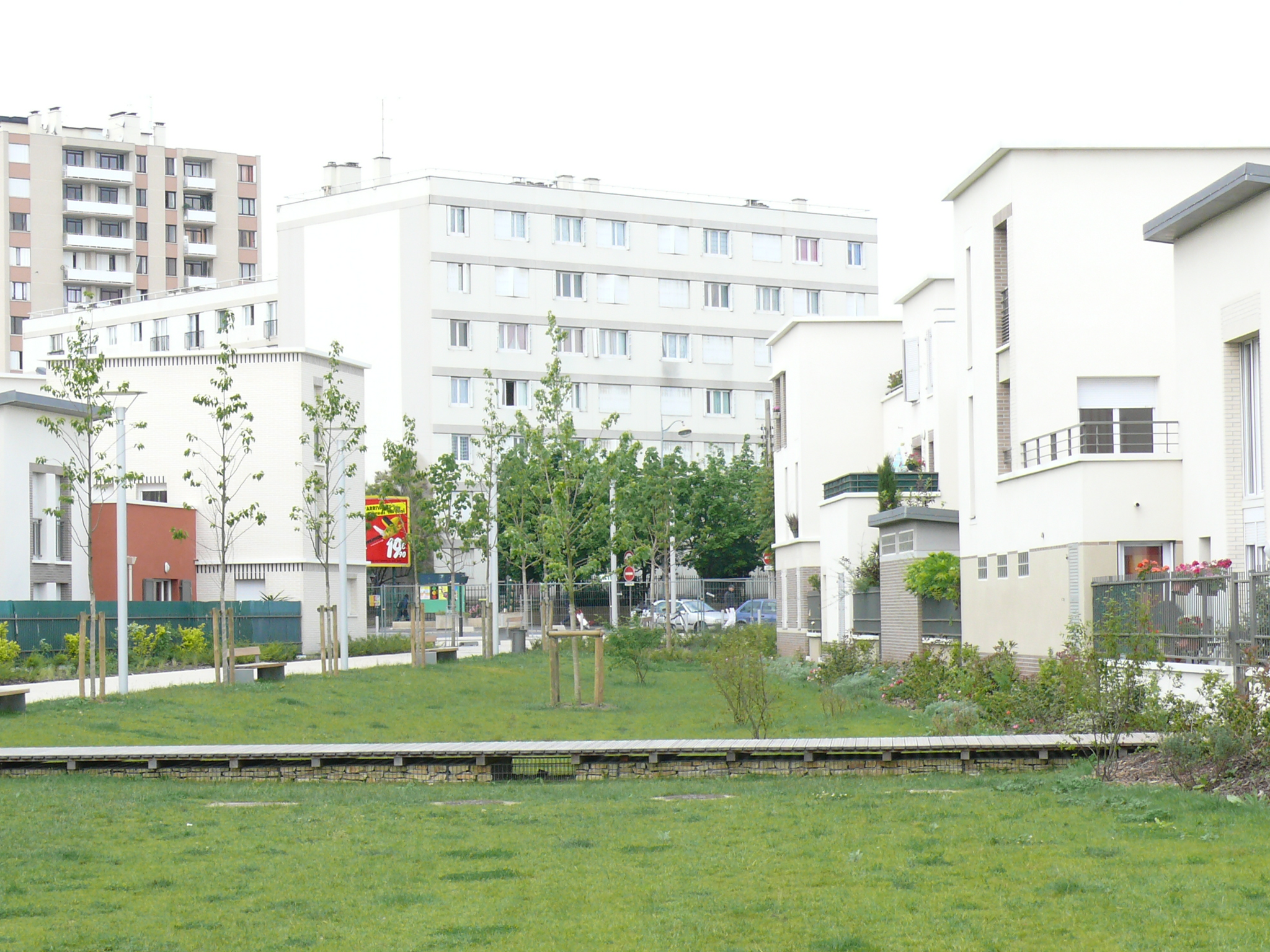

- Coat of arms

- Location (in red) within Paris inner suburbs
- Location of Stains
- Location within France Location within Île-de-France (region)
- Coordinates: 48°57′00″N 2°23′00″E
- Country: France
- Region: Île-de-France
- Department: Seine-Saint-Denis
- Arrondissement: Saint-Denis
- Canton: Saint-Denis-2
- Intercommunality: Grand Paris

Government
  - Mayor (2026–32): Azzédine Taïbi
- Area^{1}: 5.39 km^{2} (2.08 sq mi)
- Elevation: 46 m (151 ft)
- Population (2023): 41,388
  - Density: 7,680/km^{2} (19,900/sq mi)
- Time zone: UTC+01:00 (CET)
  - Summer (DST): UTC+02:00 (CEST)
- INSEE/Postal code: 93072 /93240
- ^{1} French Land Register data, which excludes lakes, ponds, glaciers > 1 km^{2} (0.386 sq mi or 247 acres) and river estuaries.

Stains (French pronunciation: [stɛ̃]) is a commune in the Seine-Saint-Denis department, in the northern suburbs of Paris, France. It is located 11.6 km (7.2 mi) from the center of Paris.

== Toponymy ==
The name Stains derives from the Latin stagna, meaning 'ponds', or any other standing bodies of water.

== History ==
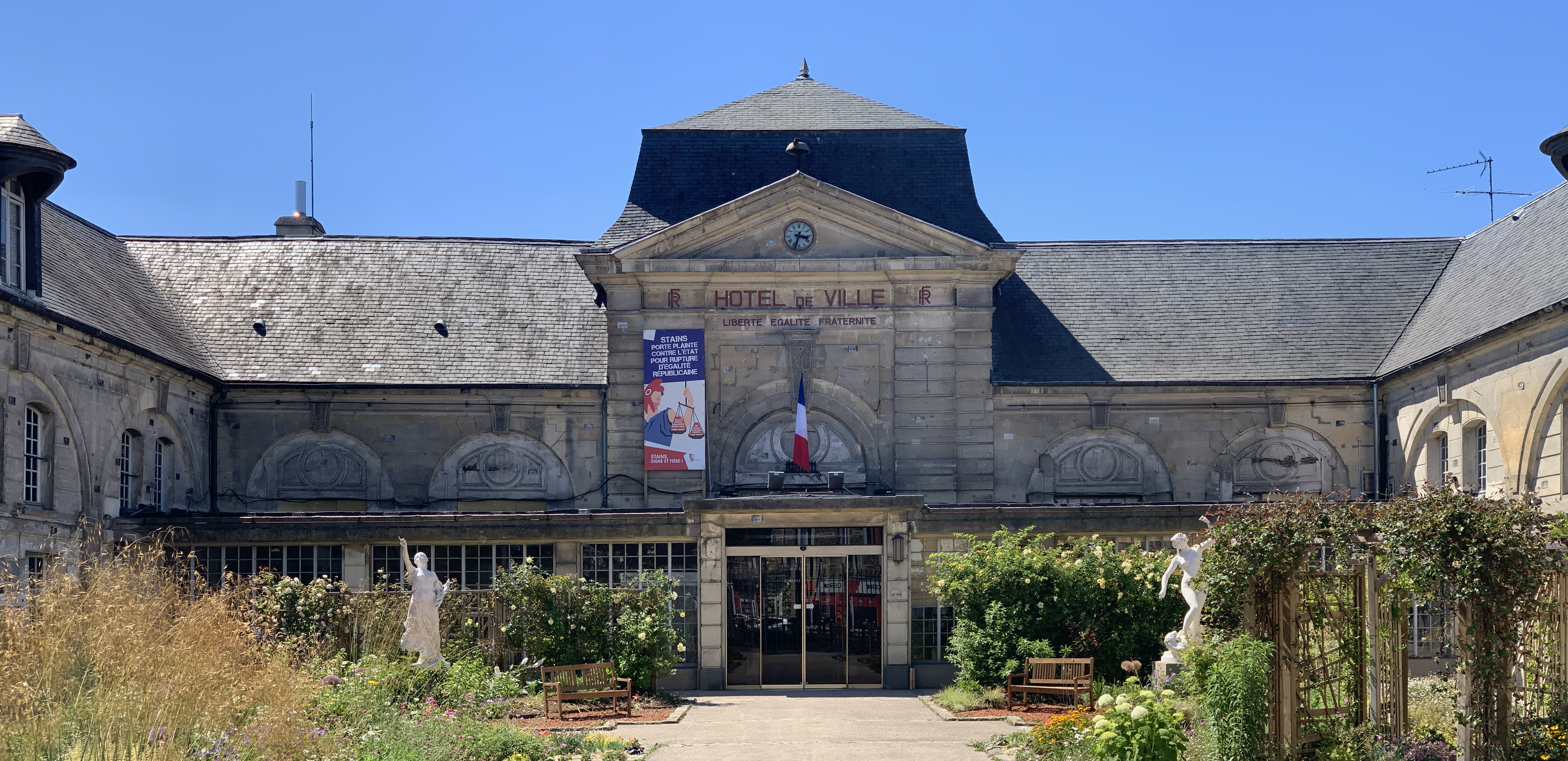
The Hôtel de Ville

The Hôtel de Ville is the former stable block of the Château of Stains completed in 1750.

== Heraldry ==
Arms of Stains	Argent with two wavy vert fesses, a chief Gules charged with three ears of wheat stalked and leaves with gold
motto: semina metes (sow and you shall reap)

== Population ==
Historical population

Year	Pop.	±% p.a.
1793	1,080	—
1800	987	−1.28%
1806	809	−3.26%
1821	829	+0.16%
1831	946	+1.33%
1836	936	−0.21%
1841	993	+1.19%
1846	1,046	+1.05%
1851	932	−2.28%
1856	1,038	+2.18%
1861	1,280	+4.28%
1866	1,571	+4.18%
1872	1,448	−1.35%
1876	1,577	+2.16%
1881	1,868	+3.44%
1886	2,288	+4.14%
1891	2,500	+1.79%
1896	2,707	+1.60%
1901	2,959	+1.80%

Year	Pop.	±% p.a.
1906	3,102	+0.95%
1911	3,584	+2.93%
1921	5,641	+4.64%
1926	10,081	+12.31%
1931	14,539	+7.60%
1936	17,604	+3.90%
1946	18,382	+0.43%
1954	19,028	+0.43%
1962	27,503	+4.71%
1968	32,169	+2.65%
1975	35,545	+1.44%
1982	36,079	+0.21%
1990	34,879	−0.42%
1999	32,839	−0.67%
2007	34,663	+0.68%
2012	36,155	+0.85%
2017	38,720	+1.38%
2023	41,388	+1.12%

Source: EHESS and INSEE (1968-2023)

== Transport ==
Stains is served by Pierrefitte – Stains station on Paris RER line D. This station is located at the border between the commune of Stains and the commune of Pierrefitte-sur-Seine, on the Pierrefitte-sur-Seine side of the border.

== Education ==
Schools in Stains:

- 11 public preschools/nursery schools (maternelles)
- 13 public elementary schools
- 3 public junior high schools: Barbara, Joliot Curie, and Pablo Neruda
- 1 public senior high school/sixth-form college: Lycée polyvalent Maurice Utrillo
- 1 private junior high school: Collège privé Sainte-Marie.

== Monuments ==
- Château de Stains (transl. Castle of Stains, destroyed in the War of 1870)
- Cité-jardin de Stains (transl. Garden City of Stains)
- Town hall of Stains
- Château de la Motte (transl. Castle of La Motte, destroyed in 1819 with the exception of a few outbuildings)
- L'église Notre-Dame-de-l'Assomption de Stains (Church of Our Lady of the Assumption of Stains)
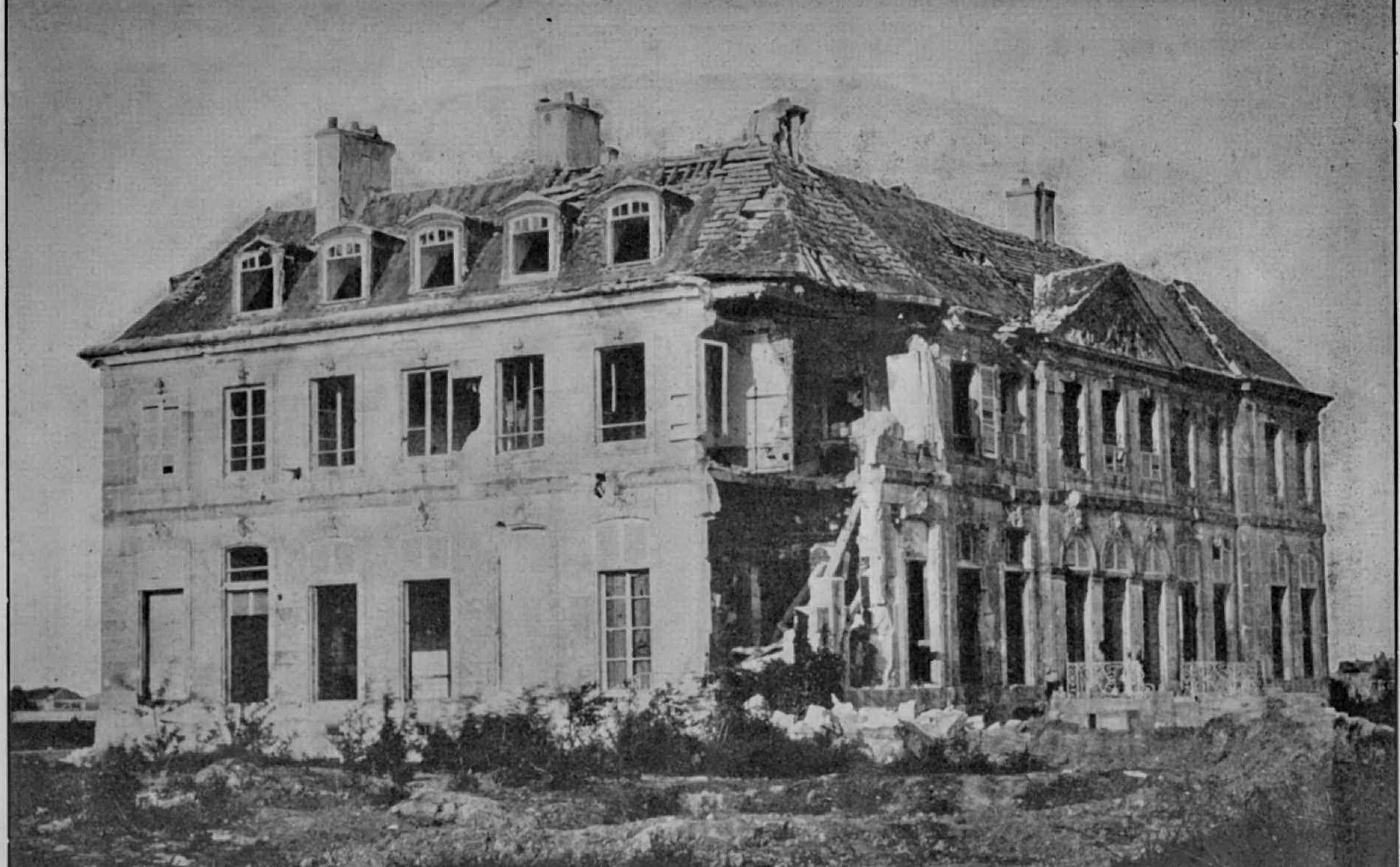
Château de Stains in 1870

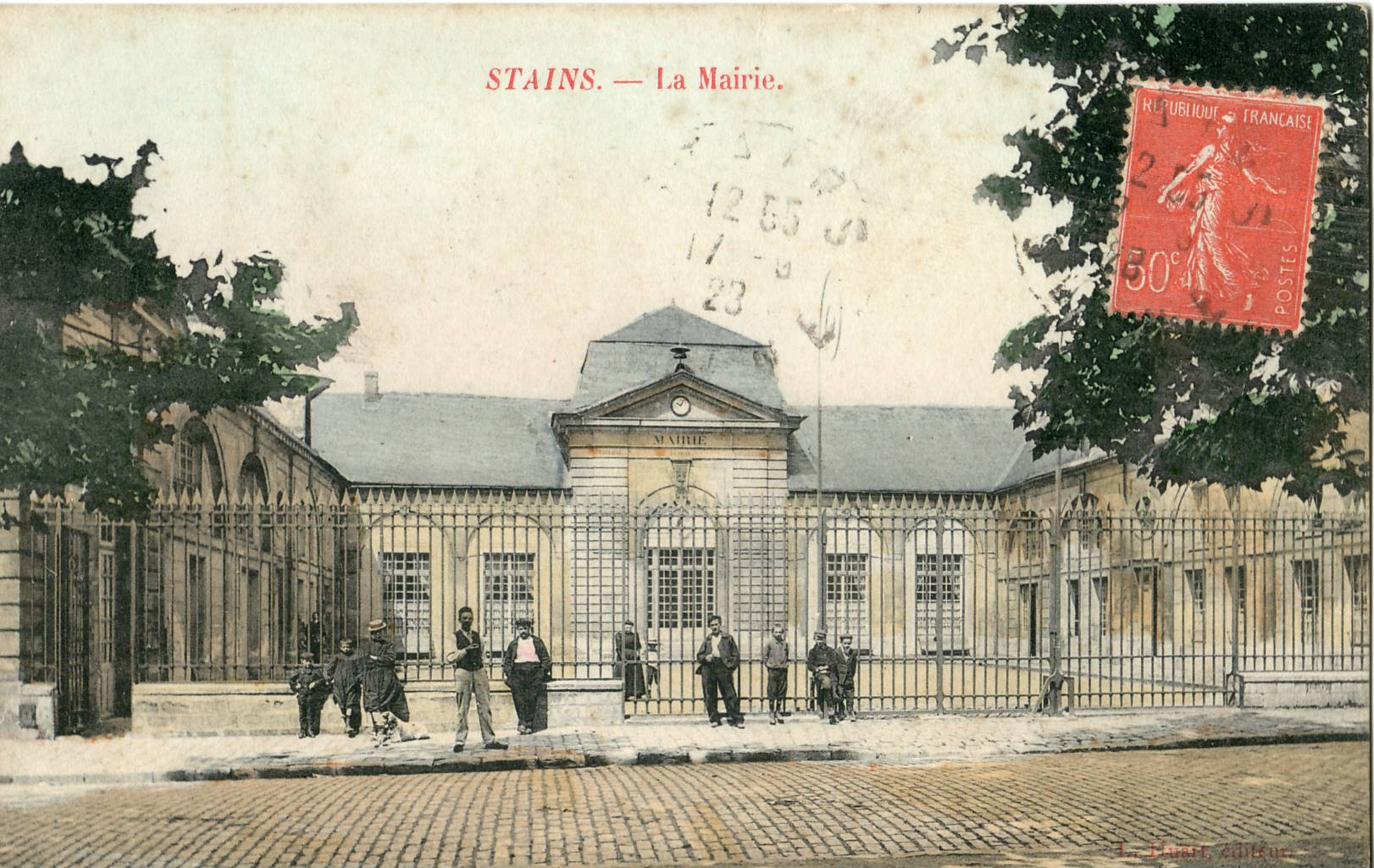
Town Hall of Stains in the 1920s.

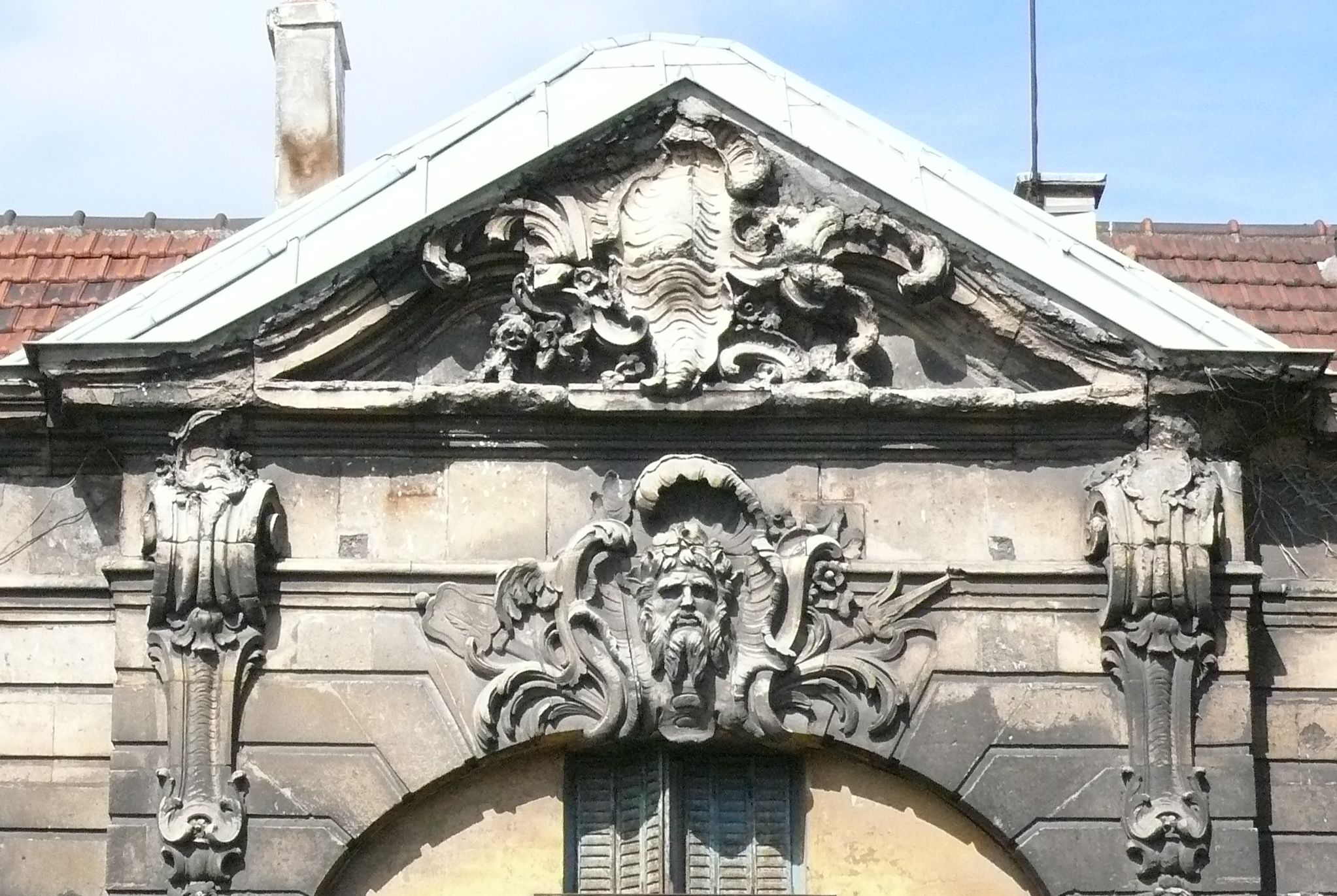
Detail of the pediment of the Château de La Motte.

== Notable people ==
- Junior Dina Ebimbe, footballer
- Mohamed-Ali Cho, footballer
- Dany Bill, Muay Thai champion, kickboxer

== Twin towns — Sister cities ==
Stains is twinned with:

- Saalfeld (Germany) since May 4, 1964: Twinning for joint projects of peace and collaboration between the German and French people.
- Cheshunt (United Kingdom) since 1965: Traditional twinning
- Luco dei Marsi (Italy) since December 15, 2000: Multilateral collaboration in the fields of sport, tourism, environment and development in the field of NICTs, allowing the enhancement of reciprocal cultural wealth.
- Am'ari (Palestine) since January 15, 1999: Multilateral cooperation with the Palestinian refugee camp of Am'ari in the West Bank, in solidarity with the peace forces in the region.
- Mengueme (Cameroon) since 2000: Cooperation agreement on health, education, sanitation, rural electrification, ecosystem preservation, development of agriculture, livestock but also culture, sport and tourism.
- Figuig (Morocco) since October 18, 2002: Cooperation agreement on youth citizenship, cultural exchanges, health and prevention, local development, town planning and the environment.

== See also ==
- Communes of the Seine-Saint-Denis department
