= Canton of Saint-Denis-2, Seine-Saint-Denis =

Coordinates: 48.94°N 2.36°E

The canton of Saint-Denis-2 is an administrative division of the Seine-Saint-Denis department in the Île-de-France region, northern France. It was created at the French canton reorganisation which came into effect in March 2015. Its seat is in Saint-Denis.

It consists of the following communes:

1. Saint-Denis (partly)
2. Stains
