= Lycée Paul Éluard (Saint-Denis, Seine-Saint-Denis) =

Coordinates: 48.9424°N 2.3643°E

Lycée Paul-Éluard
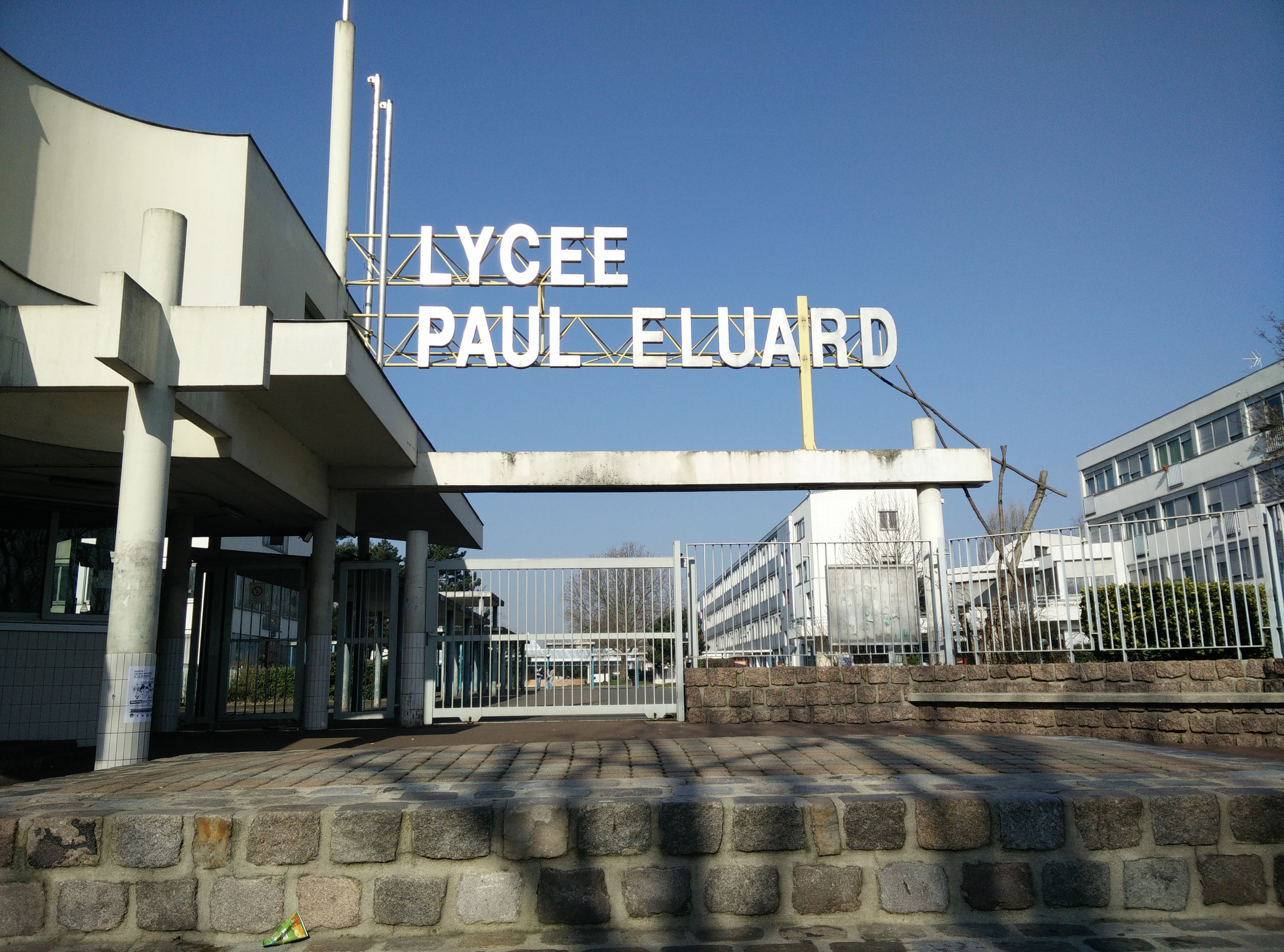
- Main entrance.

Information
- Type: Public high school

Lycée Paul Éluard is a senior high school/sixth-form college in Saint-Denis, Seine-Saint-Denis, France, in the Paris metropolitan area.

As of 2016 the school has fewer than 300 employees, including about 200 teachers, and about 1,700 students.
