= Hôtel de Ville, Saint-Denis, Seine-Saint-Denis =

Town hall in Saint-Denis, Seine-Saint-Denis, France

Hôtel de Ville
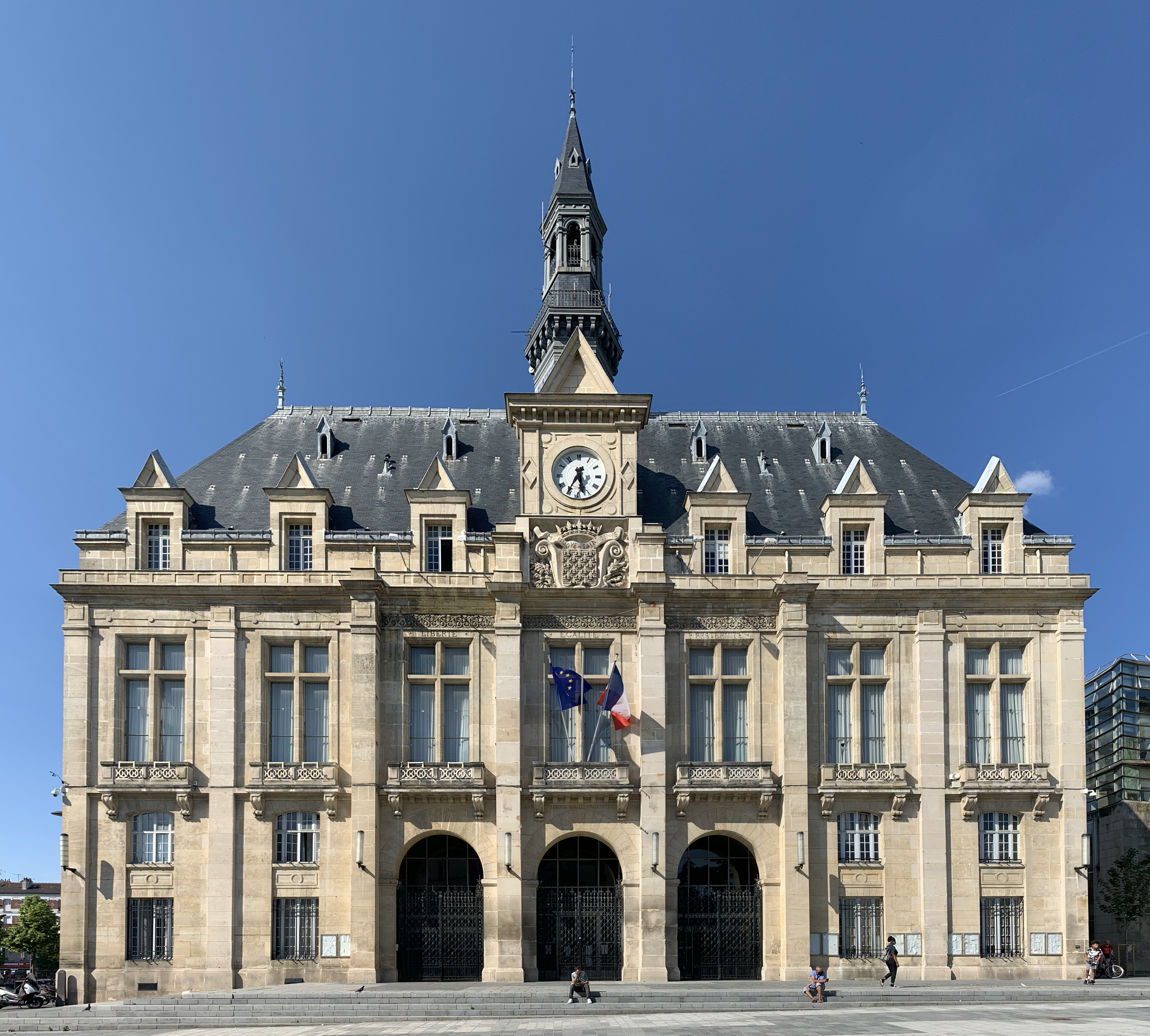
- The main frontage of the Hôtel de Ville in May 2020
- Interactive map of the Hôtel de Ville area

General information
- Type: City hall
- Architectural style: Renaissance style
- Location: Saint-Denis, France
- Coordinates: 48.9361°N 2.3584°E
- Completed: 1883

Design and construction
- Architect: Paul Laynaud

The Hôtel de Ville (French pronunciation: [otɛl də vil], City Hall) is a municipal building in Saint-Denis, Seine-Saint-Denis, in the northern suburbs of Paris, standing on Place Victor-Hugo.

== History ==
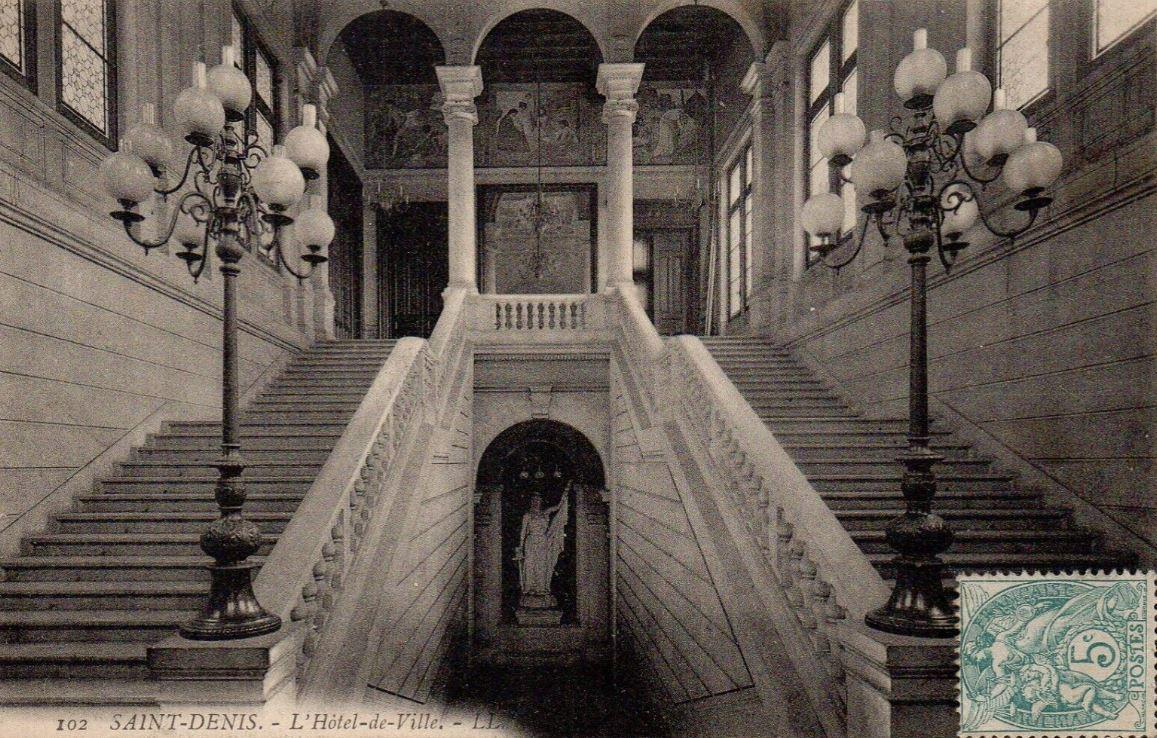
The Grand Staircase

The first meeting place of the bailiff and aldermen, appointed by King Louis XV on 9 June 1720, was the home of Jean-Baptiste Le Laboureur. This arrangement continued until 30 July 1733, when they relocated to a house on Place Pannetière (now Place Victor-Hugo). By the 1870s, the old town hall was dilapidated and the town council decided to demolish the old house as well as the other buildings in the same block, and to commission a new town hall on the same site.

The foundation stone for the new building was laid by the president of Paris City Council, Maurice Engelhard, on 30 October 1881. It was designed by Paul Laynaud in the Renaissance style, built in ashlar stone and was officially opened by the president of France, Jules Grévy, on 21 November 1883. A medal was issued to celebrate the occasion.

The design involved a symmetrical main frontage of seven bays facing onto Place Pannetière. The central three bays contained tall round headed openings with imposts, voussoirs and iron grills. The other bays on the ground floor were fenestrated by bipartite windows, stacked one on top of the other with panels in between. The first floor was fenestrated by tall mullioned and transomed windows with stone balconies, and the bays were flanked by full-height pilasters supporting a frieze. At roof level, there were six dormer windows connected by a parapet. Above the central bay, there was a panel with a coat of arms, surmounted by a clock and a triangular pediment and, behind the clock, there was an octagonal belfry with a spire. Internally, the principal rooms were the Salle de Conseil (council chamber) and the Salle des Mariages (wedding room). The interior design of these rooms was undertaken by Gaston Cailleux in the 1890s, and the ceilings and walls were decorated by Henri Rapin in the 1920s.

The belfry was badly damaged by a fire on 7 June 1988, but was subsequently restored. An annexe to the town hall, built to the east of the main building and connected by a glass bridge, was opened in April 1993. It was designed by Henri Gaudin and Bruno Gaudin, and constructed in stone and glass.
