= Lycée Maurice Utrillo =

Lycée Maurice-Utrillo

Information
- Type: Public high school

Lycée Maurice Utrillo is a comprehensive (polyvalent) senior high school/sixth form college in Stains, Seine-Saint-Denis, France, in the Paris metropolitan area.

As of 2016 it has 150 employees, including 100 teachers, and 1,200 students.

It opened in September 1990.
