= Lycée Évariste-Galois =

Lycée Évariste-Galois may refer to:

- Lycée Évariste Galois (Beaumont-sur-Oise) in Beaumont-sur-Oise
- Lycée Évariste Galois (Noisy-le-Grand)
- Lycée Évariste Galois (Sartrouville)
