= Bry-sur-Marne station =

Railway station in Bry-sur-Marne, France

Bry-sur-Marne
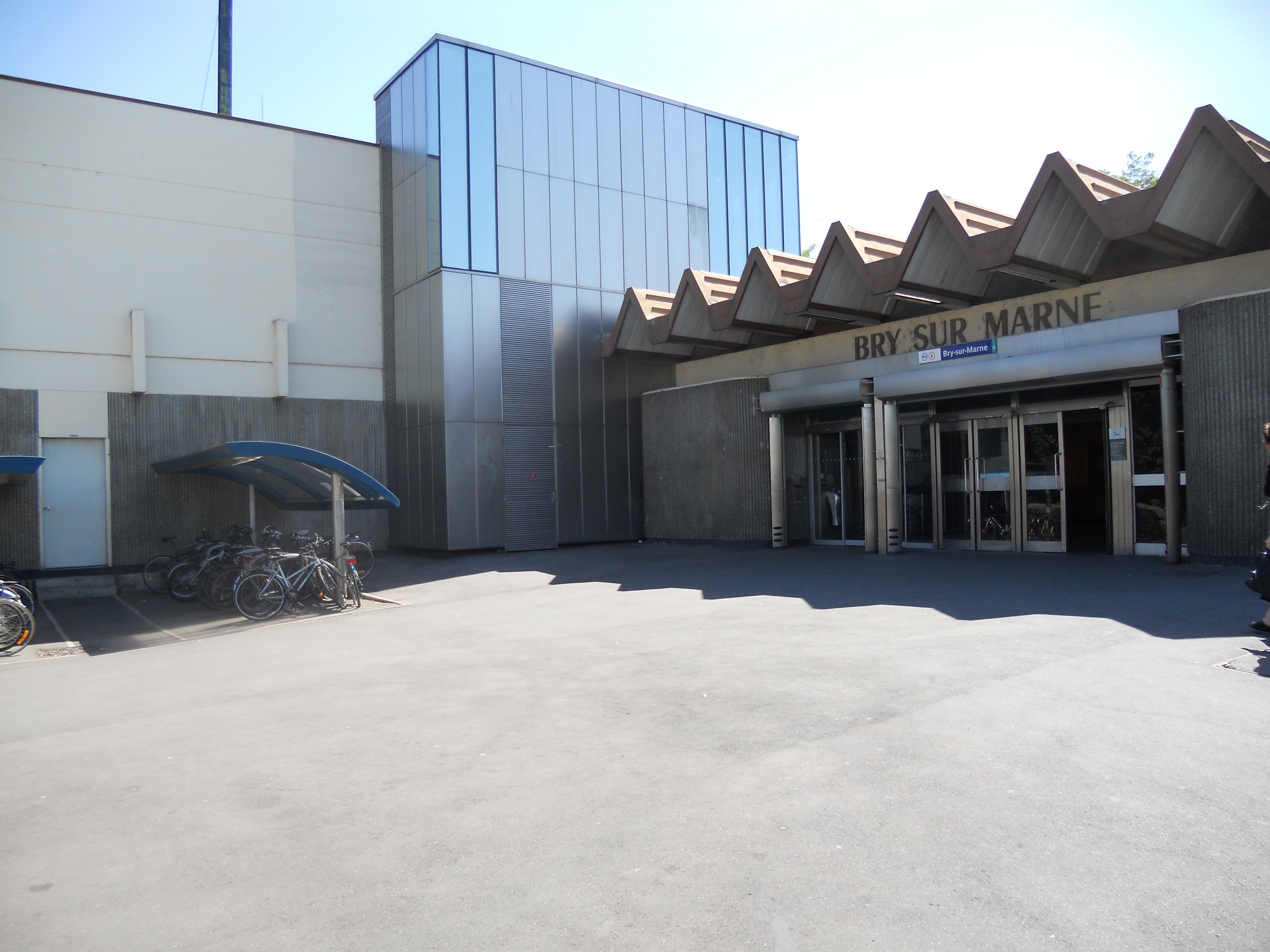
- Bry-sur-Marne station entrance

General information
- Location: Bry-sur-Marne; France
- Coordinates: 48°50′40″N 2°31′34″E
- Operator: RATP Group
- Platforms: 2 side platforms
- Tracks: 2
- Connections: RATP Bus: 120 220 520

Construction
- Structure type: Elevated
- Cycle facilities: Covered racks
- Accessible: Yes, by request to staff

Other information
- Station code: 87758326
- Fare zone: 4

History
- Opened: 9 December 1977

Passengers
- 2019: 2,450,013

Services
Preceding station	RER	Following station
Neuilly-Plaisance towards Cergy-le-Haut	RER A	Noisy-le-Grand – Mont d'Est towards Marne-la-Vallée–Chessy
Location

Bry-sur-Marne station is an Réseau Express Régional station in the Paris suburb Bry-sur-Marne (in the Val-de-Marne department).

== The station ==
The station is named for the town in which it is located, in the eastern suburbs of Paris. It comprises two tracks – one going towards Paris, the other towards Marne-la-Vallée and Disneyland Paris. The station contains a help desk, an automated ticket-vending machine, and a baker's shop. The tracks are on an elevated level; lifts provide access for wheelchair users.

The station is on the very edge of Bry-sur-Marne, close to the town of Noisy-le-Grand, thus making it also the closest available station for residents in parts of that town.

As of 2019, the estimated annual attendance by the RATP Group was 2,450,013 passengers.

=== RER A ===
On the A line, Bry-sur-Marne is located on branch A4, leading to the Marne-la-Vallée station, and thus connecting Paris both to parts of the western suburbs and to Disneyland Paris (which is in fact well outside Paris).

As it is a fairly small town, Bry-sur-Marne is one station (along with neighbouring Neuilly-Plaisance) where trains do not systematically stop, in either direction. Complaints by residents, requesting systematic stops at the station, have become something of a local issue, acknowledged by the mayor.

== Bus connections ==
The station is served by RATP Bus network lines: 120 (to Nogent-sur-Marne and to the town hall of Noisy-le-Grand), 220 (to Torcy) and 520 (a local shuttle bus).

== Gallery ==
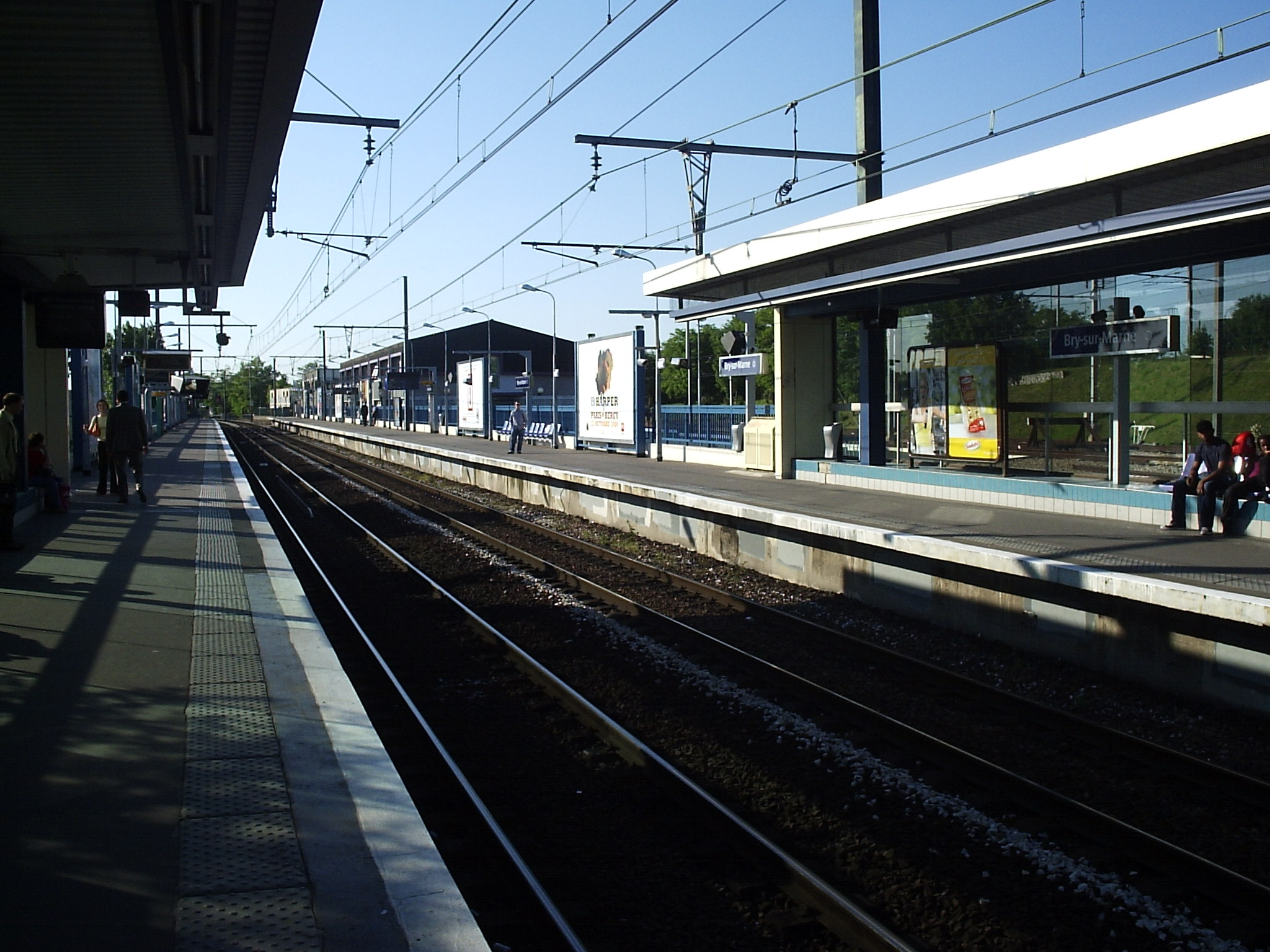
Platforms and tracks towards Paris
(in 2006)

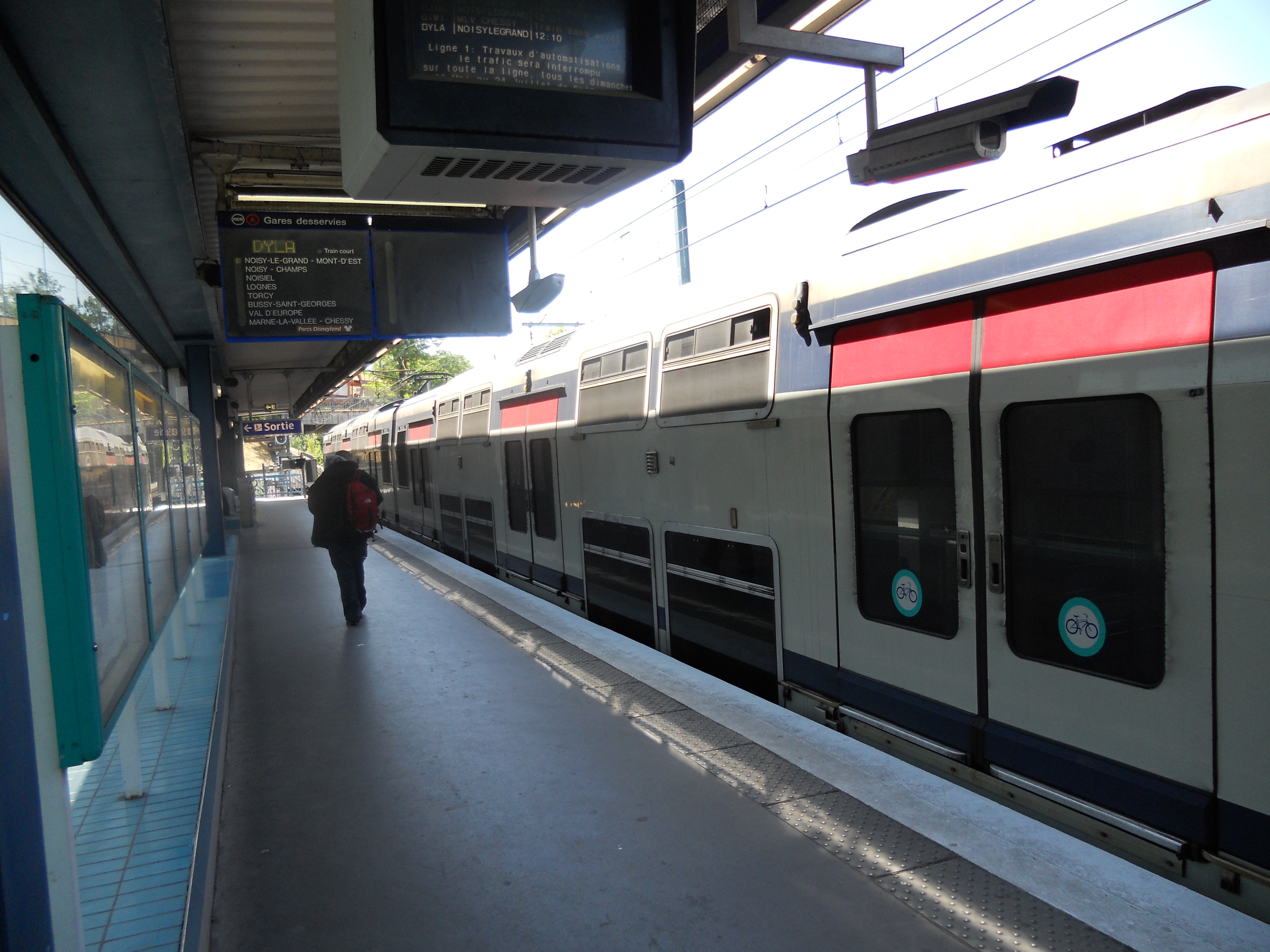
Train stopping on its way to Noisy-le-Grand.
The noticeboard indicates what stations the train will stop at and the screen indicates the following trains (time and destination)

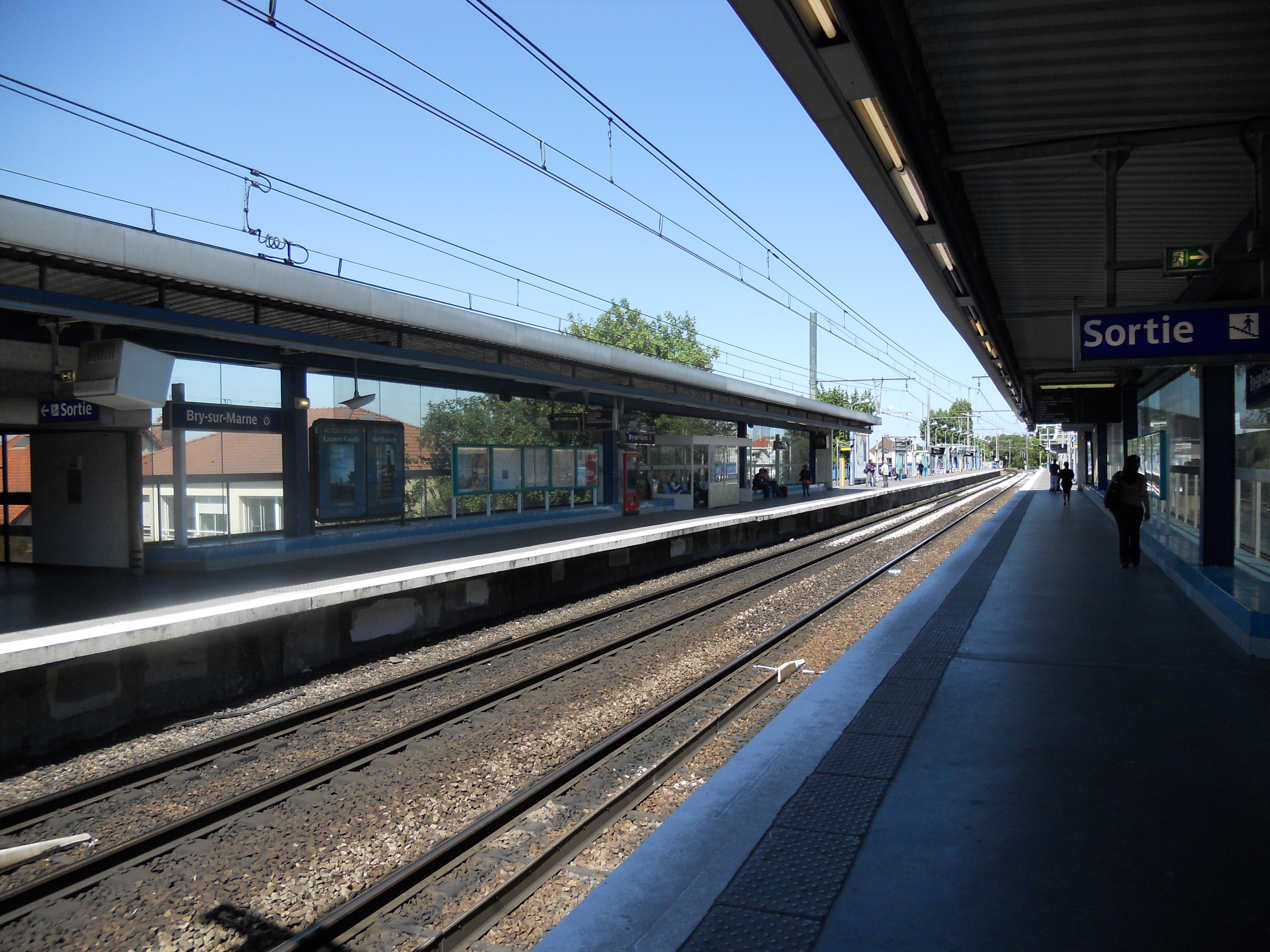
Platforms for trains towards Paris (left side) and towards Marne-la-Vallée (right side)
