= François de Gaulle =

French Catholic priest (1922–2020)

- Born: 13 February 1922; Montceau-les-Mines, France
- Died: 2 April 2020 (aged 98); Bry-sur-Marne, France
- Occupations: Priest; Missionary

François de Gaulle (French pronunciation: [fʁɑ̃swa d(ə) ɡol]; 13 February 1922 – 2 April 2020) was a French Catholic priest and missionary.

== Biography ==
The nephew of Charles de Gaulle, François joined the White Fathers in 1940, and entered seminary in Tunisia. Starting in 1950, he spent 50 years in French Upper Volta, and watched as it transitioned to Burkina Faso.

De Gaulle was the author of J'ai vu se lever l'Église d'Afrique, produced from interviews with Victor Macé de Lépinay and published in 2011.

De Gaulle died on 2 April 2020, in Bry-sur-Marne at the age of 98, from COVID-19 during the pandemic in France.
