= Lycée Flora Tristan =

Lycée Flora Tristan may refer to the following French schools:

- Lycée Flora Tristan (Noisy-le-Grand)
- Lycée Flora Tristan (Camblanes-et-Meynac) in Camblanes-et-Meynac
- Lycée Flora Tristan (La Ferté-Macé) in La Ferté-Macé
- Lycée Flora Tristan (Roubaix) in Roubaix
