= Noisy-le-Grand – Mont d'Est station =

Railway station in Noisy-le-Grand, France

Noisy-le-Grand–Mont d'Est
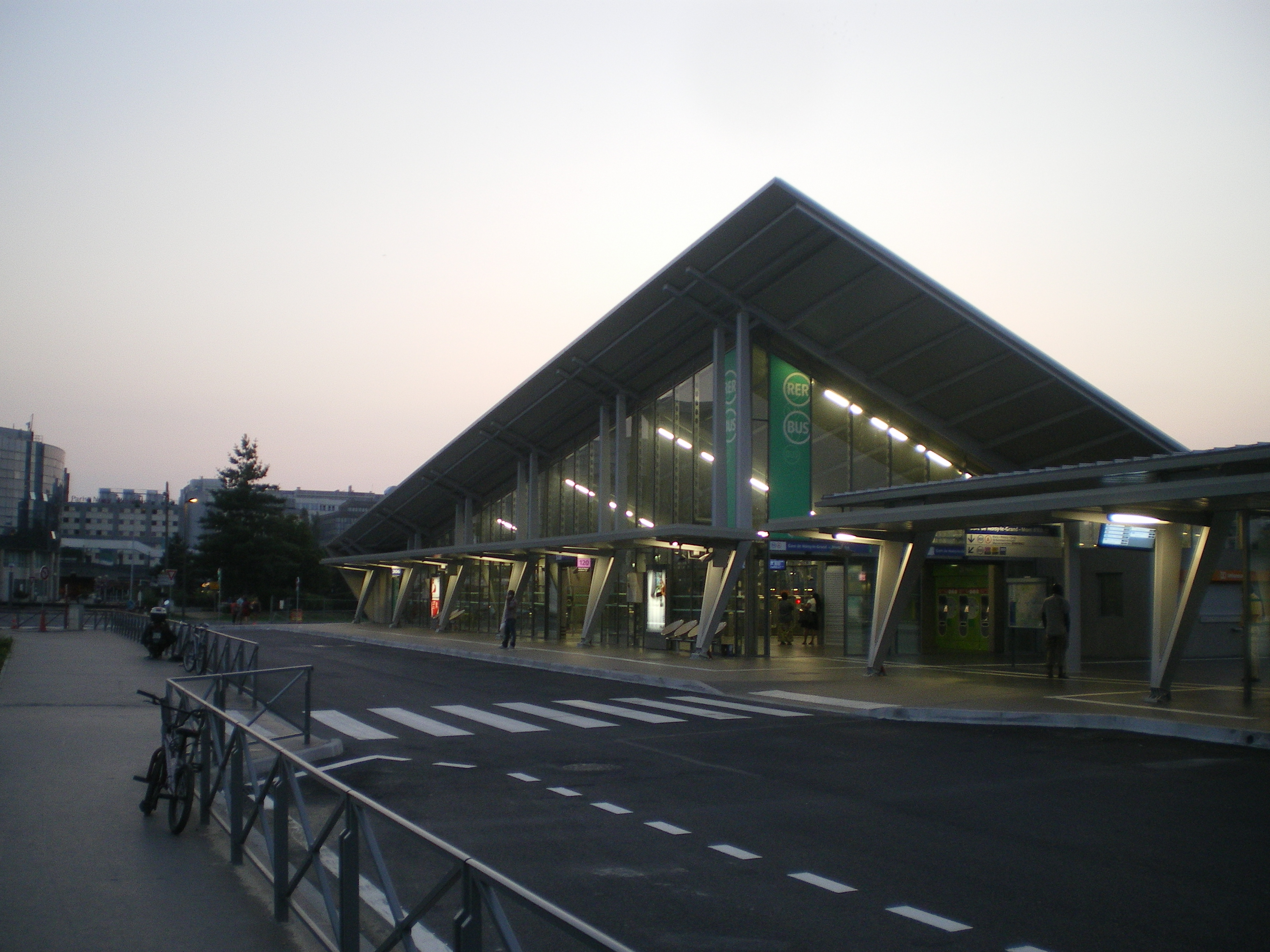
- The station building seen from the bus station.

General information
- Location: Avenue du Pavé Neuf; Noisy-le-Grand; France
- Coordinates: 48°50′26″N 2°32′53″E
- Operator: RATP Group
- Platforms: 1 island platform 1 side platform
- Tracks: 3
- Connections: RATP Bus: 120 206 207 303 306 310 320; Noctilien: N34 N130

Construction
- Structure type: Below-grade
- Parking: 587 spaces
- Cycle facilities: Racks
- Accessible: Yes, by request to staff

Other information
- Station code: 87758334
- Fare zone: 4

History
- Opened: 9 December 1977

Passengers
- 2019: 7,609,131

Services
Preceding station	RER	Following station
Bry-sur-Marne towards Cergy-le-Haut	RER A	Noisy–Champs towards Marne-la-Vallée–Chessy
Location

Noisy-le-Grand–Mont d'Est station is a train station in Noisy-le-Grand, Seine-Saint-Denis, under Les Arcades department store.

== Description ==
The station is in the Mont d'Est district of Noisy-le-Grand, under Les Arcades department store. One can walk from the station to the mall without going outside.

=== History ===
The station opened in 1977 as RER line A was officially created.

During the 1990s, a SK people mover was supposed to link the station and office blocks, but the project failed. However, the line was created and the ghost station still exists.

=== Traffic ===
As of 2019, the estimated annual attendance by the RATP Group was 7,609,131 passengers.

== Transport service ==
=== Train ===
Noisy-le-Grand–Mont d'Est is served by RER line A. The average waiting time for trains to Paris and Marne-la-Vallée–Chessy is 10 minutes. During peak hours, some trains from Paris terminate there.

=== Bus connections ===
The station is served by several buses:

- RATP Bus network lines: 120 (to Nogent-sur-Marne), 206 (to Emerainville and Pontault-Combault), 207 (to La-Queue-en-Brie), 303 (to Bobigny), 306 (to Saint-Maur – Créteil), 310 (to Noisy – Champs and to Les Yvris–Noisy-le-Grand) and 320 (a circular line serving several districts of Noisy-le-Grand);
- Noctilien network night bus lines: N34 (between Paris (Gare de Lyon) and Torcy) and N130 (between Paris (Gare de Lyon) and Marne-la-Vallée–Chessy – Disneyland).

== Gallery ==
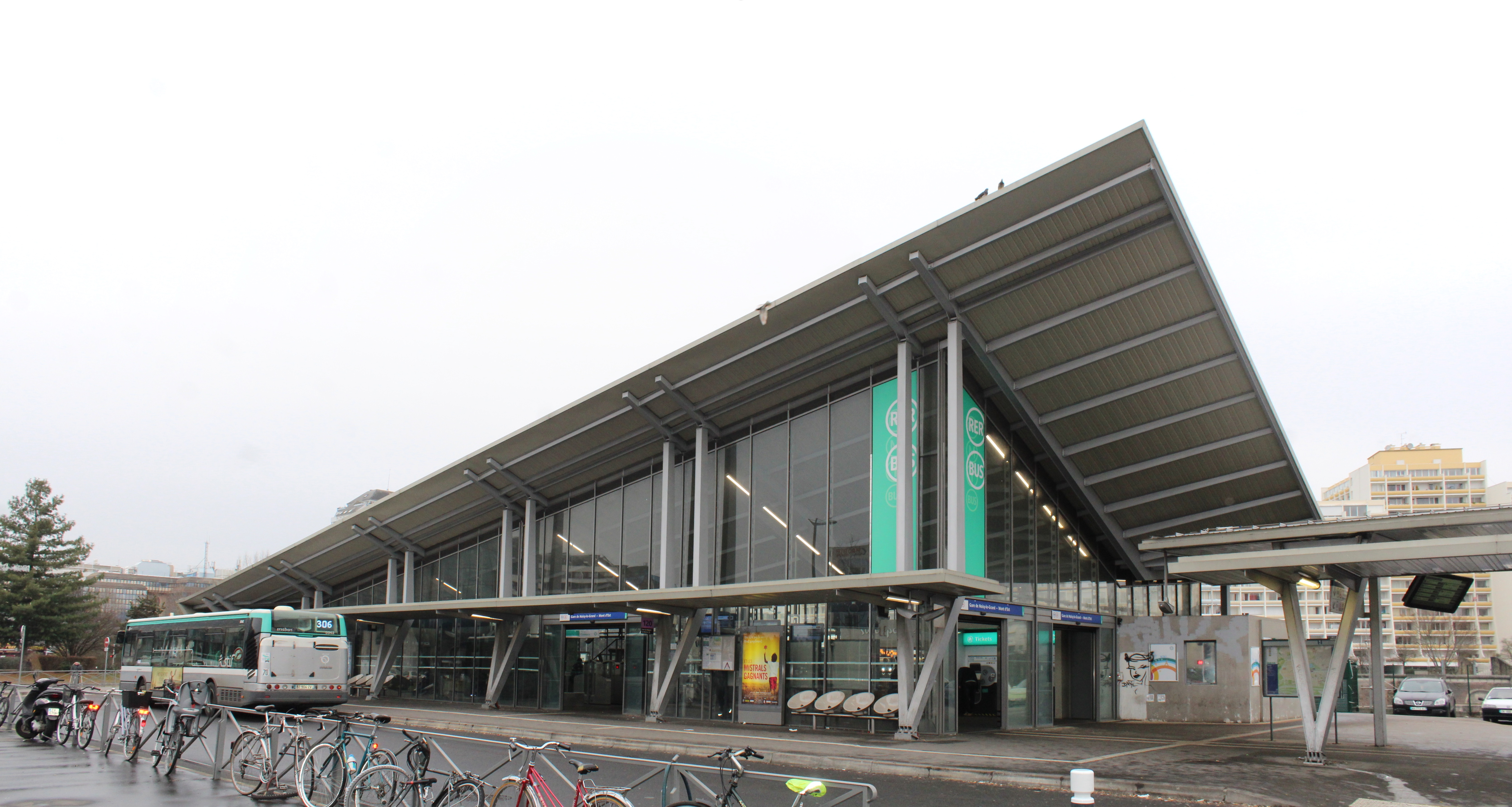
Main entrance to the station
(with the bus station partly visible)

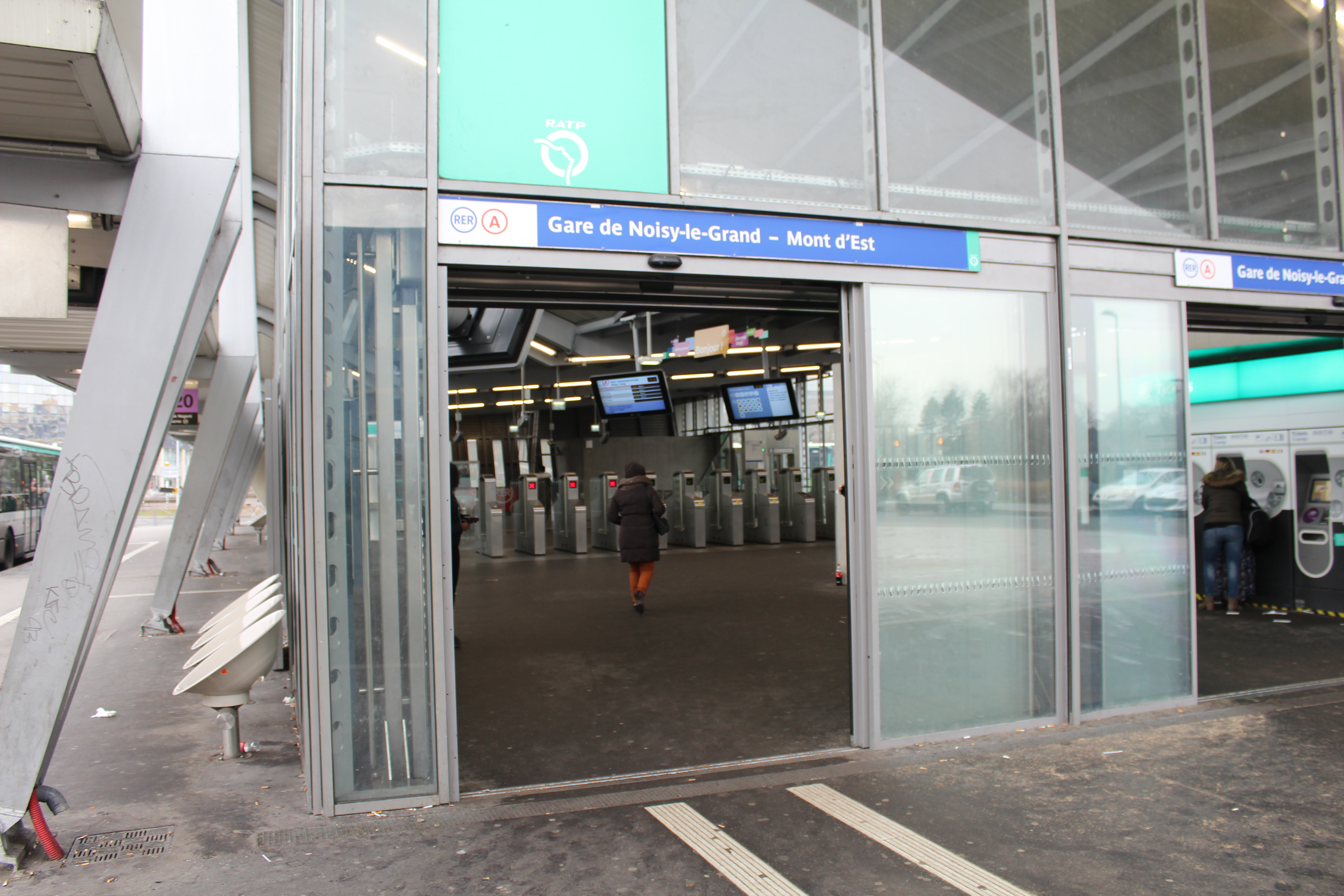
Main entrance and hall of the station

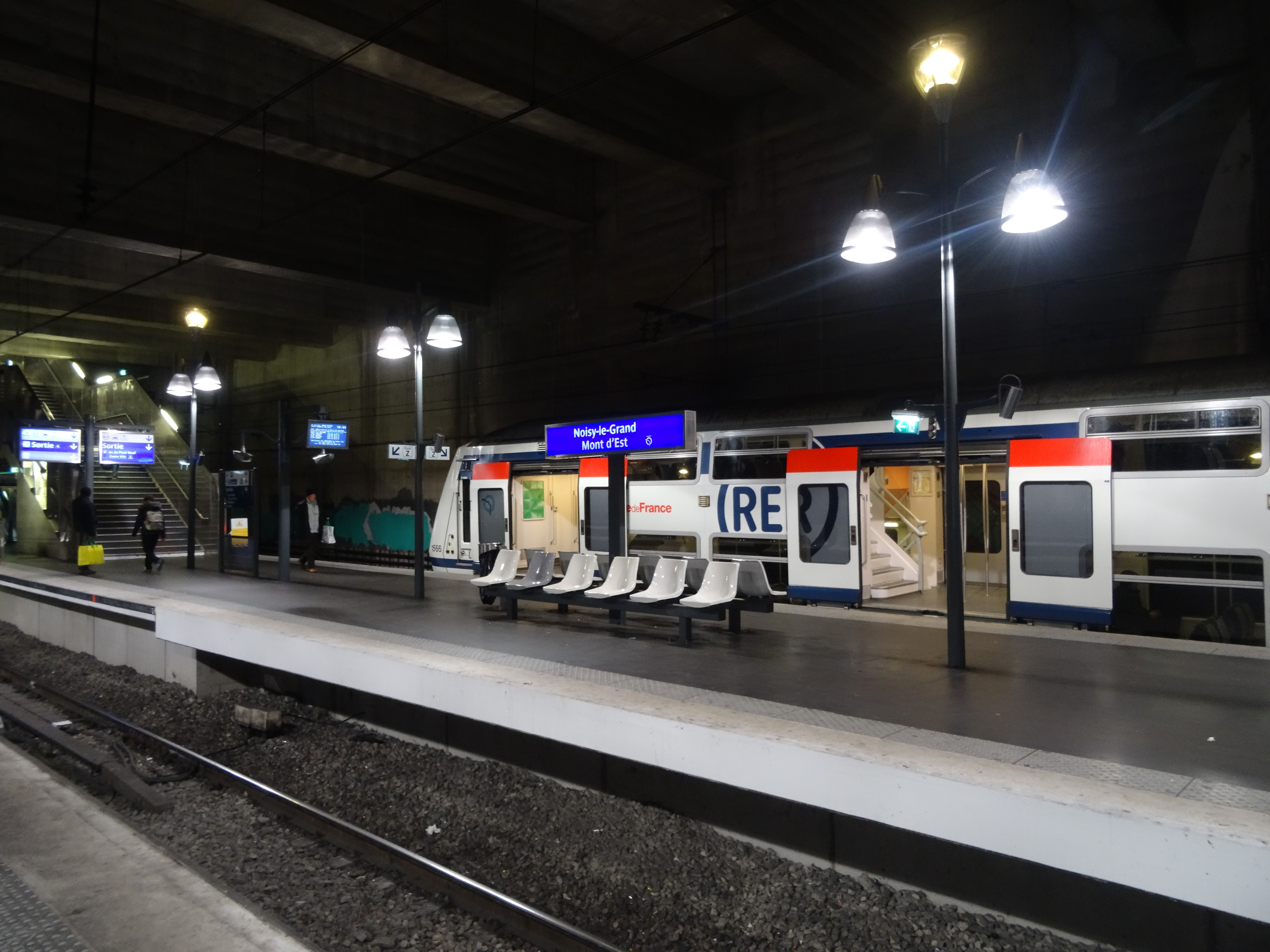
Train serving the station
(towards Paris)

== See also ==
- Noisy-le-Grand Metro
