= Noisy-le-Grand Metro =

Defunct people mover line in Greater Paris

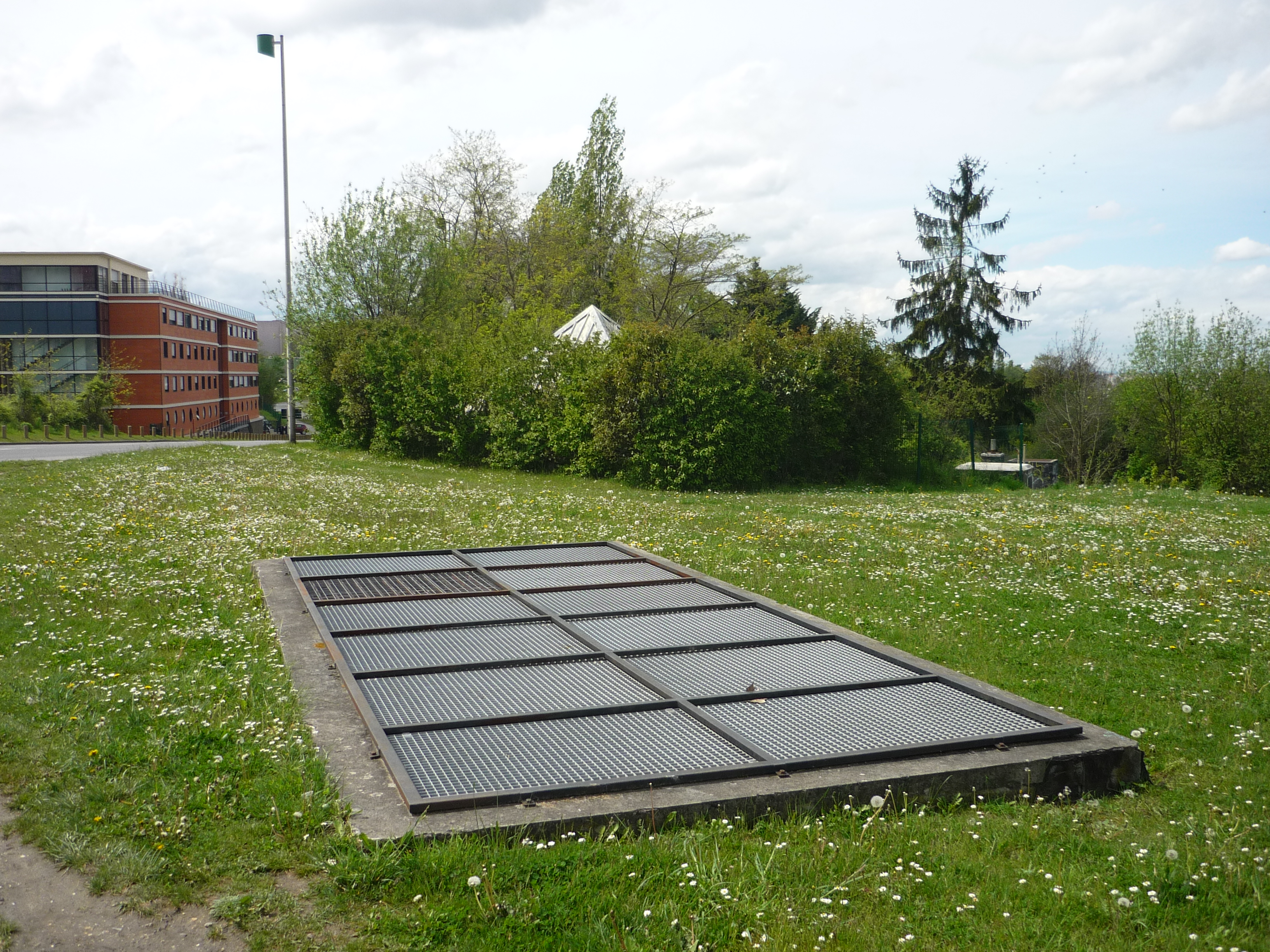
- Remains of the installations at Mailles Horizons, with an air vent in the foreground and the terminus building in the background.

Overview
- Status: Abandoned
- Termini: Noisy-le-Grand – Mont d'Est station; Z.A.C. Mailles Horizons
- Stations: 2

Service
- Type: People Mover
- Operator(s): EpaMarne
- Rolling stock: SK 4000

History
- Opened: 22 February 1993
- Closed: 7 October 1999

Technical
- Line length: 0.518 km (0.322 mi)

The Noisy-le-Grand Metro (French: Métro de Noisy-le-Grand) is a abandoned people mover line in Noisy-le-Grand, France. It was built and inaugurated, but never opened to the public. It was equipped with an advanced version of the SK system.

== History ==
=== Origins ===
In 1988, the first project was announced as part of promoter Christian Pellerin's "Maille Horizon Complex". The line was a double-track system, entirely underground, that measured 518 meters (1,699 ft) in length and had two stations. The purpose of the people mover system was to allow easy access to the vast real estate project by ensuring a rapid and continuous link between the center of the complex and the Noisy-le-Grand – Mont d'Est station on A Line of the Île-de-France RER.

On 4 July 1991 (34 years ago), the Syndicat des transports parisiens (STP), predecessor of the Syndicat des transports d'Île-de-France (STIF, now Île-de-France Mobilités), authorized construction of the system. Later the same month, on 30 July 1991, the construction project was awarded to the Ligne Horizon company.

In October 1991, Soulé was chosen to install, operate, and maintain, for the lifetime of the project, the Noisy-le-Grand SK system. This was the first installation of an SK system in an urban environment.

On 22 February 1993, construction work on the project was finished.

In November 1994, due to the bankruptcy of Christian Pellerin's project, the line was mothballed. Regular maintenance was still performed and the system was run empty on a monthly basis, with an estimated annual cost of one million francs (150,000 euros).

On 7 October 1999, the STP’s Board of Directors authorized the termination of the operating concession and closed the system.

=== Abandonment ===
This equipment belongs to the Public Development Establishments of Marne-la-Vallée (Épamarne), under the French Government, which remains responsible for its possible demolition. The SK system was bought by the RATP in 1996; the RATP is responsible for maintenance. There are no plans to open the system, nor would it be feasible after having been shuttered for so long. According to local sources, the system and equipment were in relatively good condition until 2006. Since 2007, the station, the equipment and the electrical installations are regularly looted.

In 2010, according to mayor Michel Pajon, the technology is obsolete, spare parts unavailable, the technical skills required to operate the system no longer exist and the transport cabins have not been maintained for five years. Also, the RATP refuses to provide details on maintenance costs for the system. The abandoned site is popular with urban explorers.

=== Future of the site ===
A study was undertaken in 2017 to determine the amount of asbestos used in the project's infrastructure, and the possible purchase of the remains by the city, for the symbolic cost of one euro. In July 2018, demolition started on the Mailles Horizon terminal station, in order to allow construction of housing on the land. However, the tunnel and the Mont d'Est station will not be removed.

In August 2020, the municipality of Noisy-le-Grand announced the conversion of the Mont d'Est site by 2023 into a "chic underground hybrid space" at ground level and two levels underground, including a garden, a brasserie, a wine bar, a grocery store, a concert hall, a coworking space, a playground and a pop-up store. First planned for 2023, tenders for projects on the site were announced in April 2022, with a possible opening date in 2025.

== Project cost ==
Seventy million French francs (13.7 million euros) were invested in this project, including 15 million francs at the expense of the municipality. This project has been the subject of observations by the Regional Chamber of Accounts of Île-de-France due to the important sums spent on the project, taken as a complete financial loss.
