= Bry-sur-Marne =

- Commune
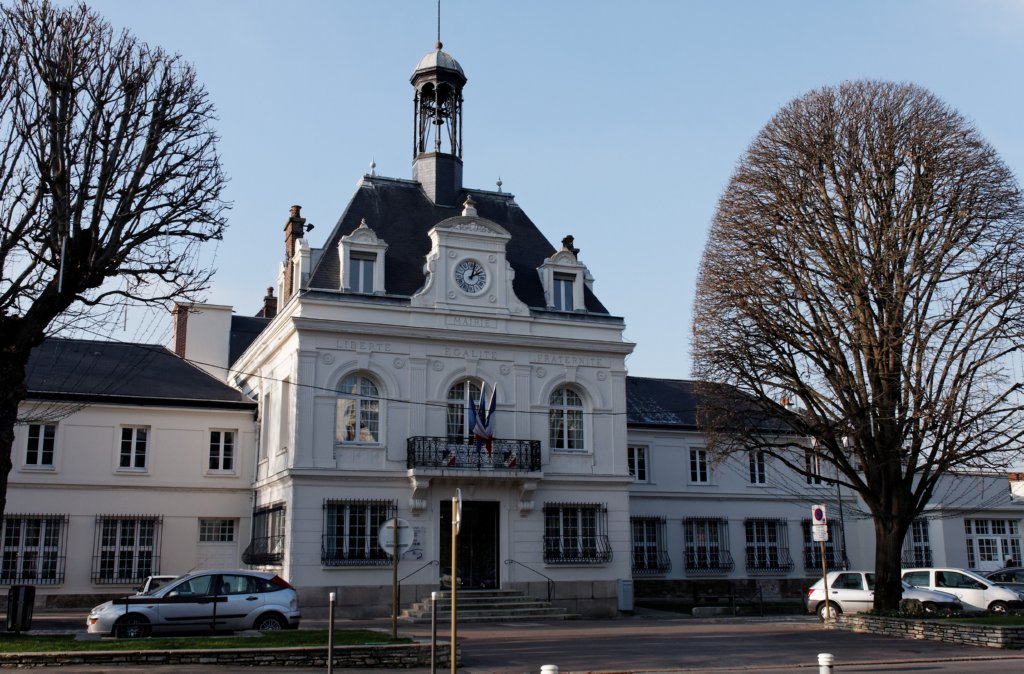
- The town hall of Bry-sur-Marne

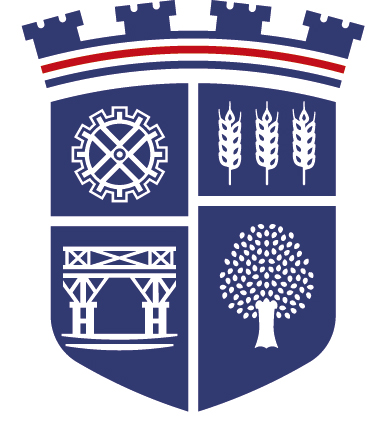
- Coat of arms

- Location (in red) within Paris inner suburbs
- Location of Bry-sur-Marne
- Location within France Location within Île-de-France (region)
- Coordinates: 48°50′28″N 2°31′20″E
- Country: France
- Region: Île-de-France
- Department: Val-de-Marne
- Arrondissement: Nogent-sur-Marne
- Canton: Villiers-sur-Marne
- Intercommunality: Grand Paris

Government
  - Mayor (2026–32): Charles Aslangul
- Area^{1}: 3.35 km^{2} (1.29 sq mi)
- Highest elevation: 100 m (330 ft)
- Lowest elevation: 36 m (118 ft)
- Population (2023): 18,503
  - Density: 5,520/km^{2} (14,300/sq mi)
- Demonym: Bryards
- Time zone: UTC+01:00 (CET)
  - Summer (DST): UTC+02:00 (CEST)
- INSEE/Postal code: 94015 /94360
- Website: www.brysurmarne.fr
- ^{1} French Land Register data, which excludes lakes, ponds, glaciers > 1 km^{2} (0.386 sq mi or 247 acres) and river estuaries.

Bry-sur-Marne (French pronunciation: [bʁi syʁ maʁn], lit. 'Bry-on-Marne') is a commune in the Val-de-Marne department in the eastern suburbs of Paris, France. It is located 12.6 km (7.8 mi) from the centre of Paris.

Part of the Métropole du Grand Paris, on the departmental border with Seine-Saint-Denis, Bry-sur-Marne is the westernmost commune of Marne-la-Vallée.

== History ==
=== Prehistory and early history ===
Bry's name comes from the Celtic word Briw, which means a bridge or a river crossing. The area has been inhabited since Neolithic times. The town's motto, which features on its coat of arms, is "Moult viel que Paris" - old French for "Much older than Paris".

In 1903, archeologist Adrien Mentienne uncovered the bones of a large bovine which died 15,000 years ago. In 1982, the skeleton of a woman who died in the 5th century BC was uncovered beneath the playground of a school in Bry. It is now housed in the town's museum.

From that century onwards, there was a permanent human presence where Bry now stands. In 1886, a necropolis was found which contained pottery, Gaul and Frankish weaponry, silver and gold jewelry, and coins, dating from the Gaul era to the Merovingian. The first known written mention of the town named Bry was in a charter signed by King Charles the Bald in 861.

The first church was built in 1130.

=== From the feudal era to modern times ===
In 1404, Robert de Châtillon, cousin of King Charles VI, was Bry's feudal lord. His castle no longer stands, and its exact location is uncertain. Bry's current château was built in the 1690s. It became the town hall in 1866. It was rebuilt after the Franco-Prussian War of 1870.

The railway came to Bry in 1926, followed by the motorway (1970) and the RER (1977). The town's hospital was built in 1936.

== Population ==
Historical population

Year	Pop.	±% p.a.
1793	425	—
1821	358	−0.61%
1846	387	+0.31%
1861	703	+4.06%
1866	845	+3.75%
1872	917	+1.37%
1876	972	+1.47%
1881	1,050	+1.56%
1886	1,330	+4.84%
1891	1,437	+1.56%
1896	1,699	+3.41%
1901	2,125	+4.58%
1906	2,733	+5.16%
1911	2,949	+1.53%
1921	3,468	+1.63%

Year	Pop.	±% p.a.
1926	4,417	+4.96%
1931	5,166	+3.18%
1936	5,182	+0.06%
1946	5,100	−0.16%
1954	6,660	+3.39%
1962	9,046	+3.90%
1968	11,672	+4.34%
1975	12,270	+0.72%
1982	12,168	−0.12%
1990	13,826	+1.61%
1999	15,000	+0.91%
2007	15,183	+0.15%
2012	16,319	+1.45%
2017	16,624	+0.37%
2023	18,503	+1.80%

Source: EHESS and INSEE (1968-2023)

== Education ==
The commune has one public preschool, Maternelle Jules Ferry; three combined public preschools and elementary schools, La Pépinière, Paul Barilliet, and Louis Daguerre; as well as one public elementary school, Henri Cahn. The commune has a public junior high school, Collège Henri Cahn.

The commune also has a private elementary through junior high school, Institut Saint Thomas de Villeneuve.

There are multiple public senior high schools in surrounding communes:

- Lycée Louis Armand (Nogent-sur-Marne)
- Lycée Hector Berlioz (Vincennes)
- Lycée Edouard Branly (Nogent-sur-Marne)
- Lycée Paul Doumer (Le Perreux-sur-Marne)
- Lycée Évariste Galois (Noisy-le-Grand)
- Lycée Pablo Picasso (Fontenay-sous-Bois)

== Personalities ==
- Photographer Louis Daguerre died in Bry-sur-Marne in 1851 and a monument marks his grave there.
- Laurel Zuckerman, author
- Hervé Bazin, author

=== Daguerre's diorama ===
Bry's most treasured artwork is a diorama painted by Louis Daguerre. The painting changes as each day wears on, mimicking daylight and night-time; the painted candlesticks light up at night. It is kept in the local church.

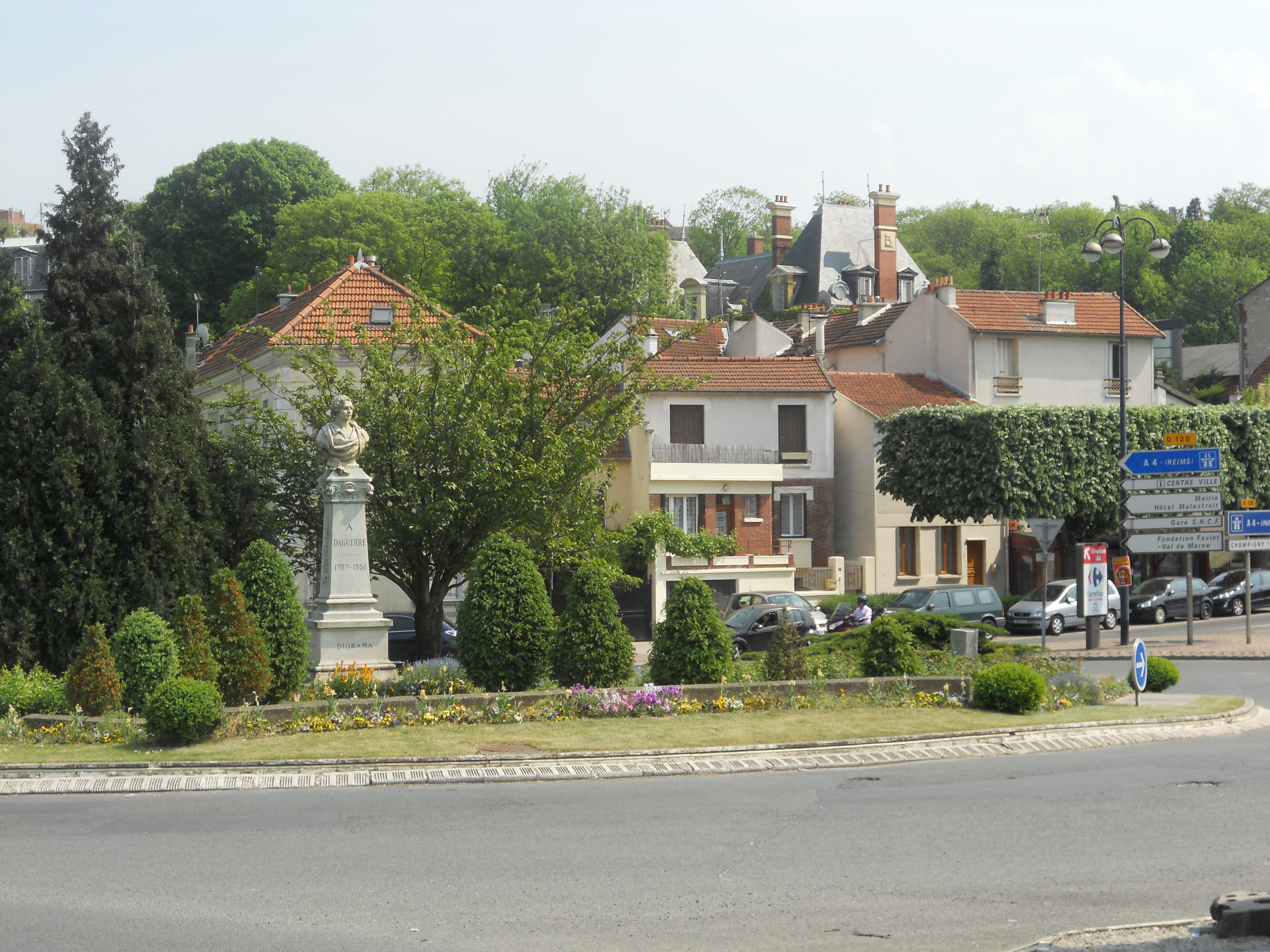
Monument to Louis Daguerre

== Transport ==
Bry-sur-Marne is served by Bry-sur-Marne station on Paris RER line A.

== International relations ==
The town has been twinned with Sawbridgeworth in Hertfordshire, England and Moosburg an der Isar in Germany since 1973.

== Organisations ==
The Institut national de l'audiovisuel has its headquarters in the commune.

== See also ==
- Communes of the Val-de-Marne department
