= Isaure Mosabau =

Congolese handball player

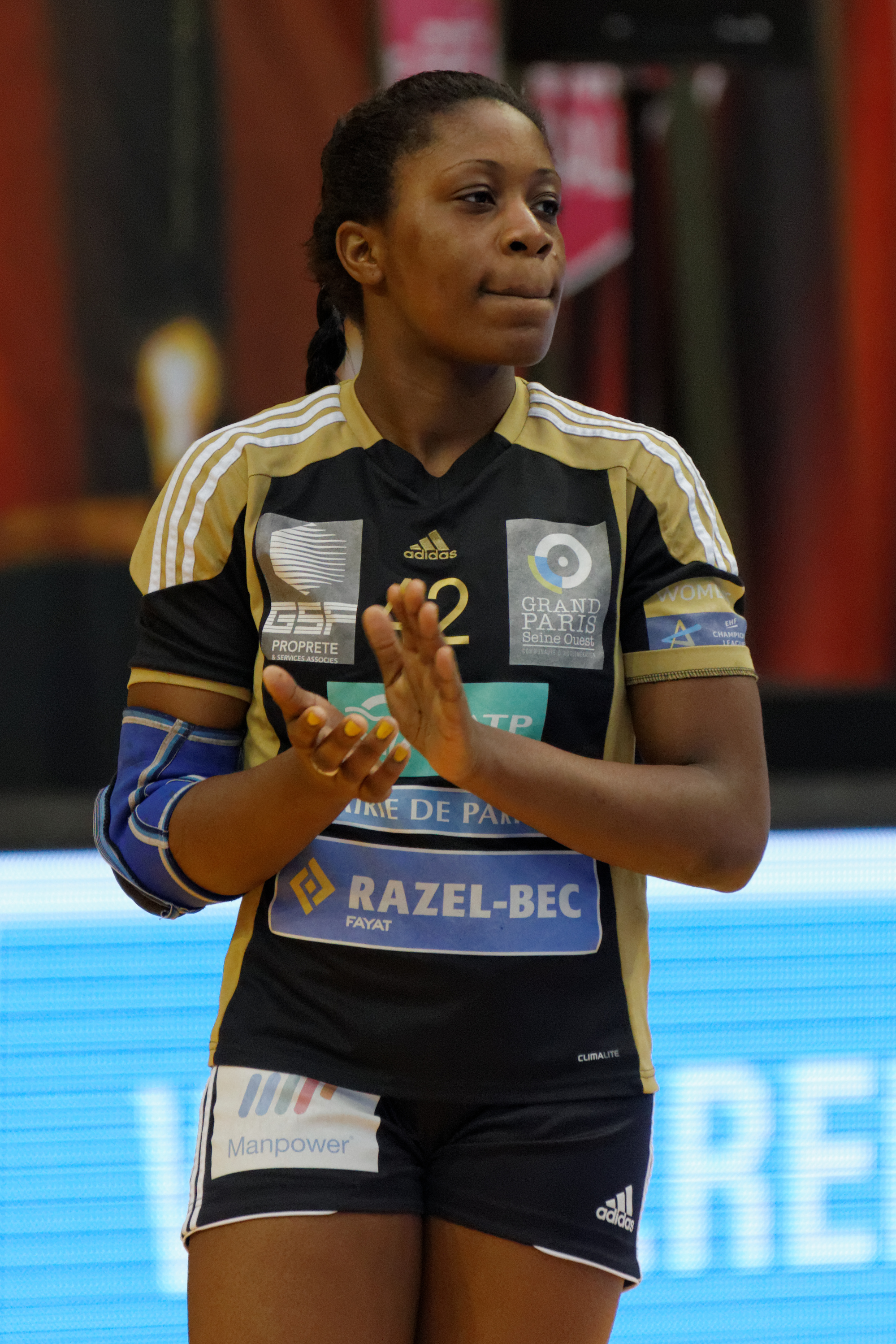

Personal information
- Full name: Isaure Mosabau Manpasika
- Nationality: Congolese
- Born: 10 June 1994 (age 32)
- Height: 1.71 m (5 ft 7 in)

Sport
- Sport: Handball
- Position: Pivot
- Current club: Noisy-le-Grand Handball
- Number: 42
National team
- Years: Team
- –: DR Congo

Isaure Mosabau Manpasika (born 10 June 1994) is a Congolese handball player for Noisy-le-Grand Handball in Noisy-le-Grand, France, and the DR Congo national team.

She represented DR Congo at the 2019 World Women's Handball Championship.
