= Théophile Poilpot =

French painter

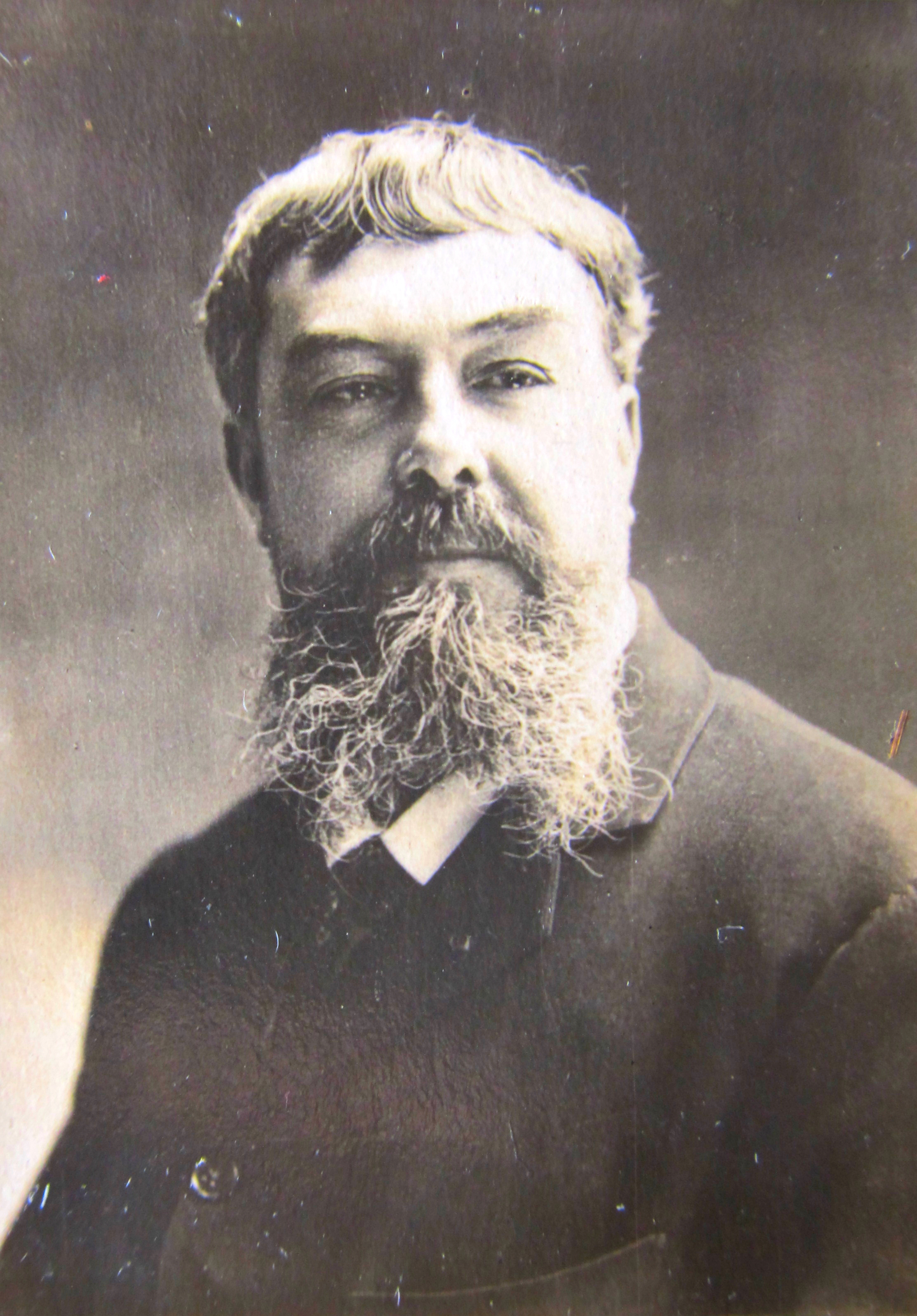
- Théophile Poilpot
- Born: 20 March 1848; Paris, France
- Died: 6 February 1915 (aged 66); Paris, France
- Education: Gustave Boulanger; Jean-Léon Gérôme
- Known for: Painter
- Movement: Realism
- Awards: Legion of Honour – Commandeur; Order of St. Anna

Théophile François Henri Poilpot (English: /pwɑːlˈpoʊ/ pwahl-POH, French: [teofil pwalpo]; 20 March 1848, Paris – 6 February 1915, Paris) was a French panorama painter.

== Biography ==
Théophile Poilpot was born and lived all his life in Paris. His father, who shared the same first name, was himself a famous painter. Théophile Poilpot was a student of Gustave Boulanger and Jean-Léon Gérôme at École des Beaux-Arts. Poilpot saw service in the Franco-Prussian War as a Sergeant of the First Volunteer Regiment of the Seine and in 1874 was retired as an officer of the reserves. He was a Mayor of Noisy-le-Grand (1887–1892) and had been an Alderman and a Cantonal Delegate. He was a noted military painter and became a Commandeur of the Legion of Honour in 1913. His paintings are prime examples of academic art of the time, particularly history painting. Among the societies to which he belonged were the Society of French Artists; the Committee of the Association of Artists, Painters, Sculptors, Architects, and Engravers; the Artistic and Literary Association and the Military Circle of the Friends of the Louvre.

== Painting career ==
Théophile Poilpot did not confine himself to French subjects, and his paintings are located in a number of countries. Several of his best known works are part of collections in the US, including Bull Run, in Washington, D.C., and the Merrimac and Monitor. Other major works by Poilpot include the Battle of Jena, now in Paris, the Crowning of Emperor Alexander III, in Moscow, the panorama of the Battle of Balaklava, now in London, the Transatlantic Panorama, which was shown at the Universal Exposition in 1889, the Algerian Panorama, shown at the Paris Exposition of 1900, and the famous Panorama of the Revolution and the Empire, now in Paris.

== Awards and honors ==
Théophile Poilpot received many honors and decorations, including the Military Medal and the appointment as a Chevalier of the Order of St. Anna of Russia.

== Works ==
=== Dioramas ===
- Battle of Nights (1894)
- The Paris of the century in 1892

=== Posters ===
Paris, National Library of France

=== Illustrations ===
Reichshoffen's Cuirassiers, historical record by Gustave Toudouze, illustrations by Th. Poilpot, Jacob and Paty.

=== Exhibitions ===
- Salon of 1874: A terrible Child 8
- Salon of 1875: The Tarabouk, memory of Algiers 9
- Salon of 1876: The Gallo-Roman Sender and Sleigh 10
- Salon of 1877: Death of Diogenes 11
- Salon of 1878: The Prey 12
- Universal Exhibition of 1889
- Universal Exhibition of 1900
