= Fayard =

Paris-based French publishing house

Fayard (French: [fajaʁ]; complete name: Librairie Arthème Fayard) is a French Paris-based publishing house established in 1857. Fayard is controlled by Hachette Livre.

== History ==
In 1999, Éditions Pauvert became part of Fayard. Claude Durand was director of Fayard from 1980 until his retirement in 2009. He was replaced by Olivier Nora, previously head of Éditions Grasset & Fasquelle another division of the Hachette group. On 6 November 2013, Nora was replaced by Sophie de Closets, who officially took over at the beginning of 2014.

In December 2009, Hachette Littérature (publisher of the Pluriel pocket collection) was absorbed by Fayard. Isabelle Seguin, the director of Hachette Littérature, became literary director of Fayard.

== Imprints ==
Fayard has three imprints:

- Editions Mille et Une Nuits
- Editions Mazarine
- Pauvert

== Works published ==
Works published by Editions Fayard include:

- Dictionnaire de la France médiévale by French historian Jean Favier
- Les Égarés by French writer Frederick Tristan which was awarded the 1983 Prix Goncourt
- Sorbonne Confidential by American author Laurel Zuckerman
- Tropic Moon by Belgian writer Georges Simenon

== Collections ==
- La Bibliothèque universelle de poche (1894)
- Modern-Bibliothèque (1904)
- Le Livre populaire (1905)
- Le Livre de demain (1923-1947)
- Leçons inaugurales du Collège de France (1950)
- Voici la France (1958)
- Recherches avancées (series editor: Raymond Abellio) (1974)
- Les Enfants du fleuve (series editor: Jean-Claude Didelot) (1990)
- Pour une histoire du XXe siècle (1991)
- Histoire de la pensée (1999)
- Fayard noir (2004-2009)
- À venir (series editor: Geoffroy de Lagasnerie) (2009)
