= SK (people mover) =

French people mover type built by Soulé

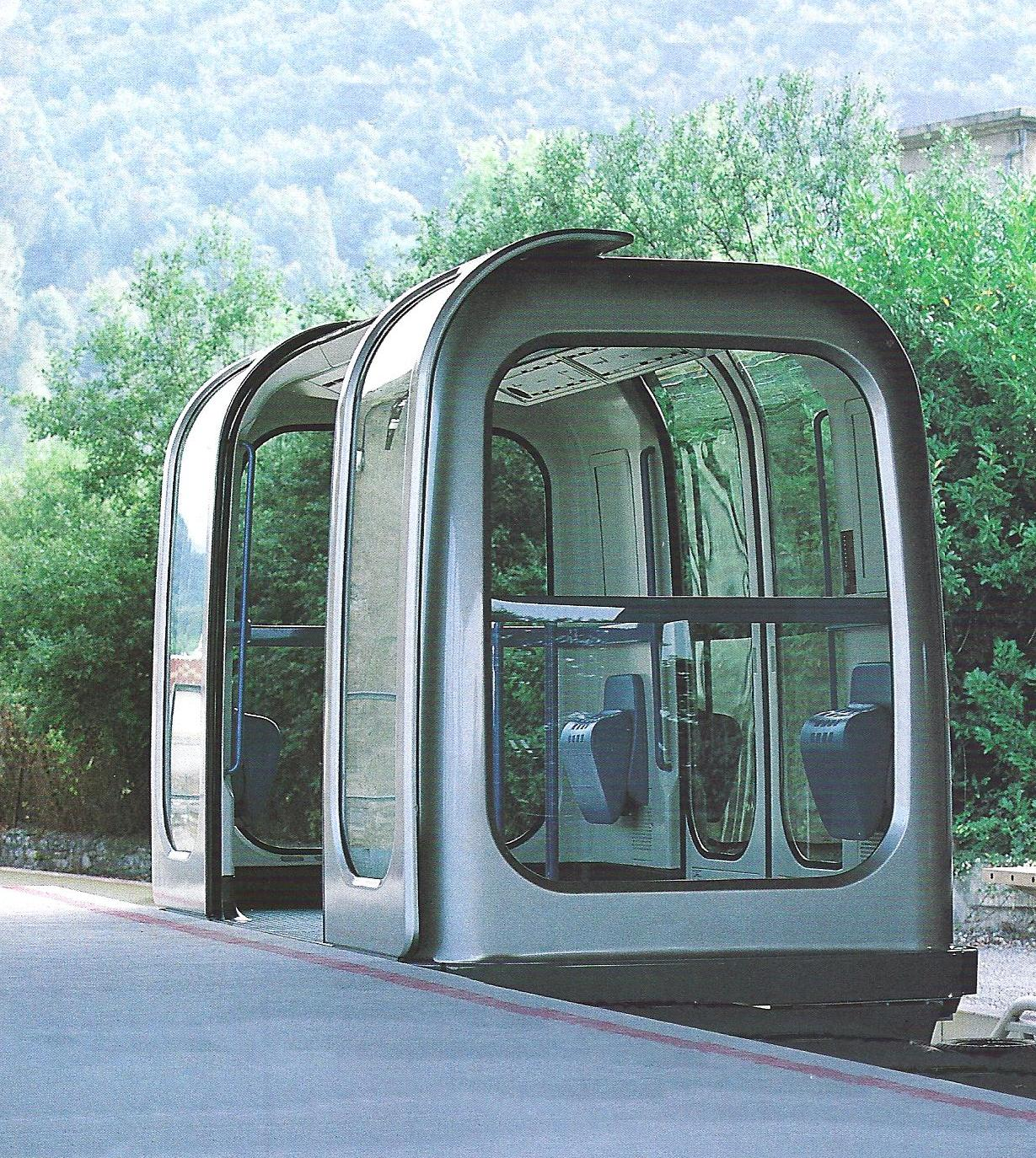
An SK cabin

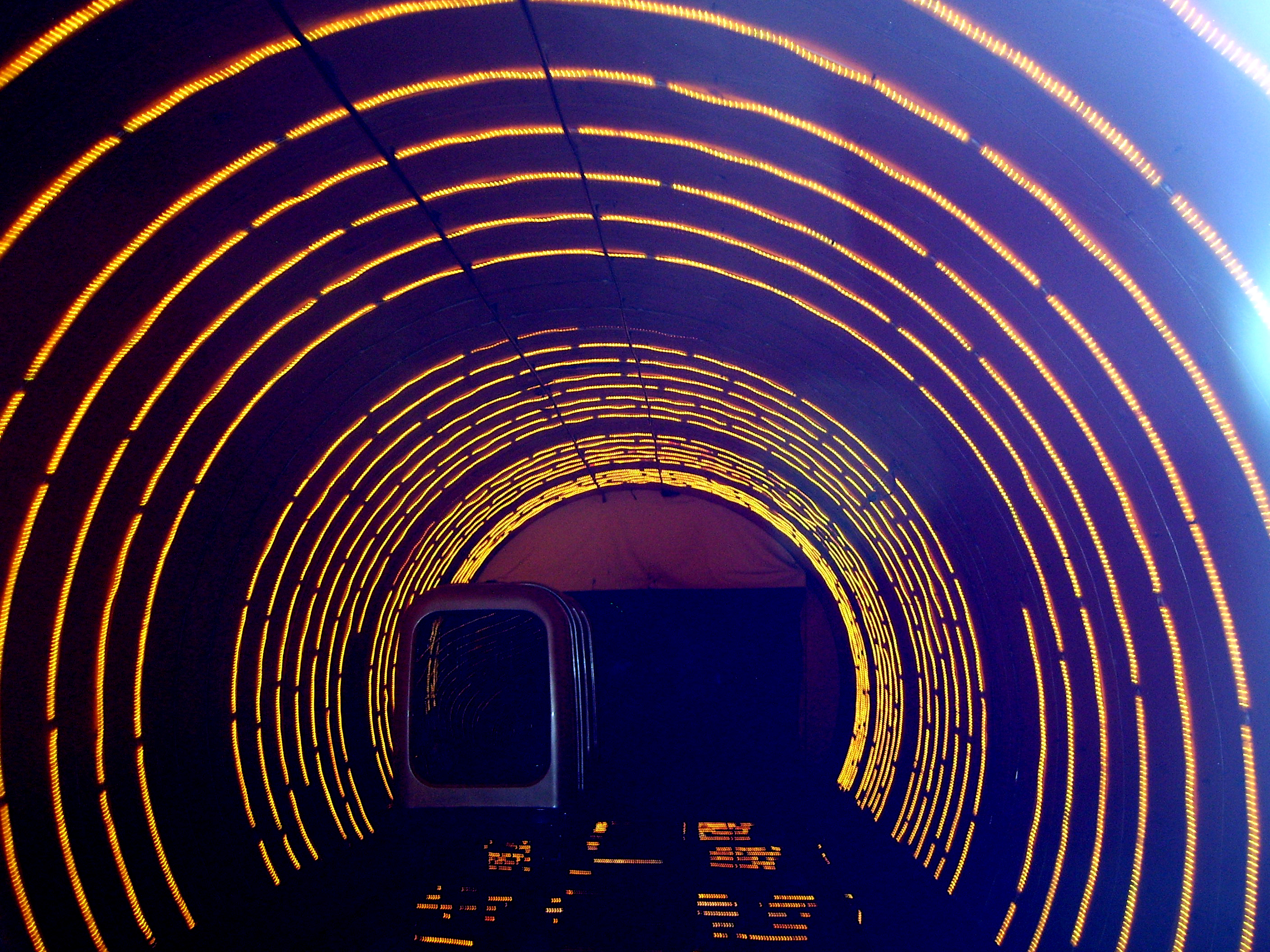
SK 6000 in the Bund Sightseeing Tunnel, Shanghai, China

The SK is a people mover built by the company Soulé from Bagnères-de-Bigorre. The initialism SK comes from the initials of the production company, Soulé, and of the designer, Kermadec.

The system consists of small cabins mounted on rails which are pulled by a cable at a constant speed. This idea is directly derived from the gondola lifts which Soulé produces for many ski resorts.

At stations, the cabin drops the cable and can stop. This technique only works on short lines; its inability to work on long or curved lines with many stops is due to risk of losing the cable and lack of stability at normal speed.

Deployed systems include the following:

- The system operated at the parking lot of the exhibition grounds of Villepinte in 1986
- An SK system operated for a period of six months at Expo 86
- In 1989, an SK system operated at an exposition in Yokohama, Japan
- An SK line was completed in February 1993 in Noisy-le-Grand but the office park it was supposed to serve was never built. The line continued to be maintained in an operational state until funding was cut in October 1999. It was subsequently abandoned, and one of the station buildings was demolished in 2018.
- Two SK 6000 lines were built at Charles de Gaulle Airport. The first was supposed to open on 1 May 1996, but the length of the line (3,500 m) created many technical problems making it impossible to open for public service. Line 2 should have opened in 1997, but it was never opened either. The project had a cost of 148 million euros before being abandoned. It was replaced by CDGVAL.
- The Bund Sightseeing Tunnel, Shanghai, China (opened 2001) uses the SK 6000.
