= Laurel Zuckerman =

American novelist

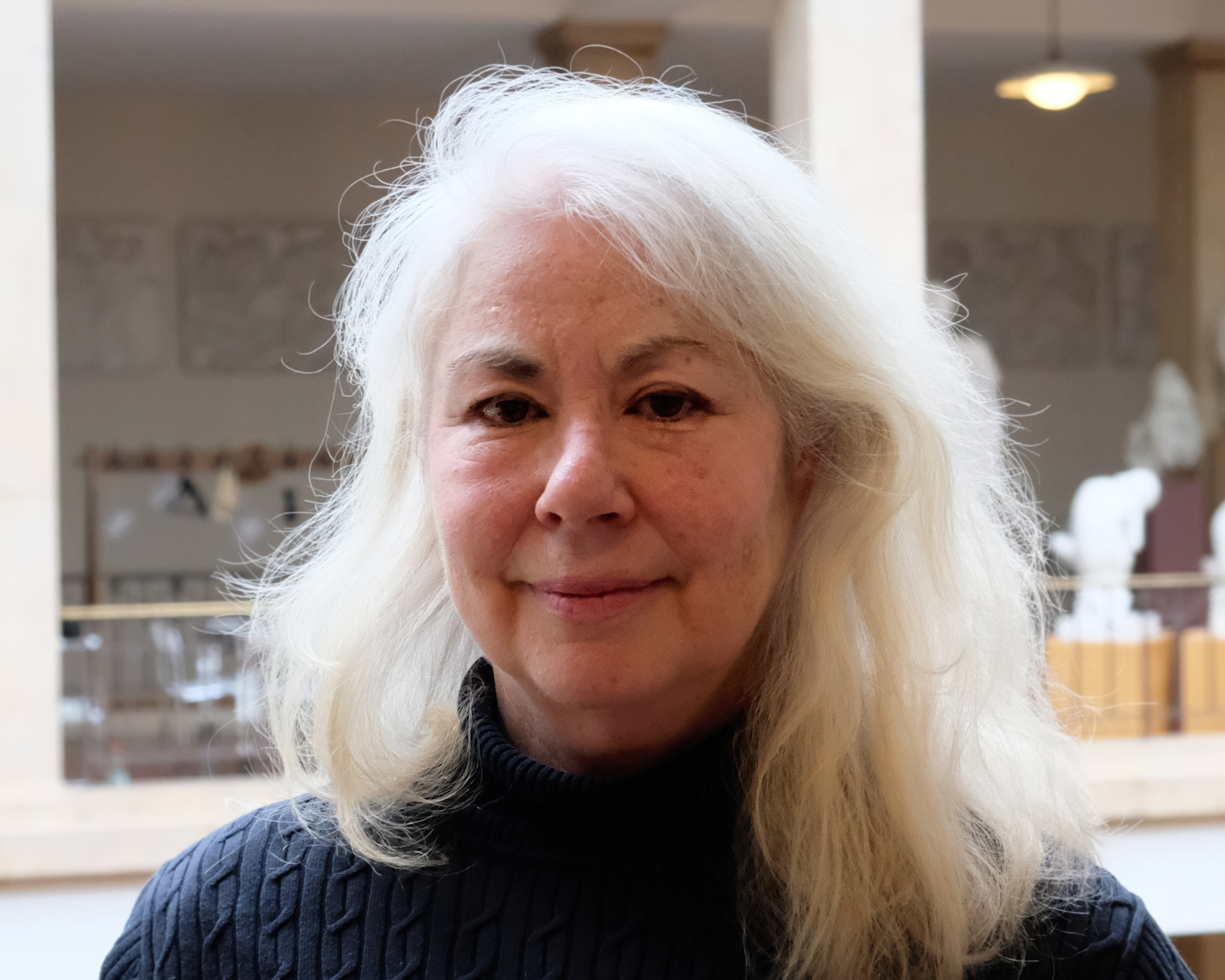
- Laurel Zuckerman (2024)
- Born: 1960 (age 64–65); Scottsdale, Arizona, U.S.
- Occupation: Author
- Children: 2

Laurel Zuckerman (born 1960) is an American author based near Paris, France.

== Biography ==
Zuckerman is originally from Scottsdale, Arizona, but now lives in France. She graduated from the HEC School of Management, a French business school. Until 2002, she worked in information technology. When the dot.com bubble burst, she decided to become an English teacher.

She first became widely known after publication of her controversial French novel Sorbonne Confidential (Fayard, 2007), a fictionalized account (with a strong autobiographical basis) of an American trying to obtain the agrégation (a competitive recruitment examination of the French Civil Service) in order to become an English teacher in the French public education system. The book is harshly critical of the French system and has generated considerable debate. The English version of the novel was published in 2009.

Her most recent novel is Professor Collie's Barbarian Dreams (Fayard, 2009), a humorous story about a historian so obsessed with the past that he forgets he lives in the present.

In 2016, after more than a decade of research, Zuckerman filed a lawsuit against the Metropolitan Museum of Art for the return to the heirs of Paul and Alice Leffmann of an early Picasso masterpiece called "The Actor". The Leffmanns, a German Jewish family, had fled Nazi Germany after being dispossessed of their home and factory. They sold the painting in 1938 to finance their escape to Brazil. The judge ruled that the family had waited too long to file the case, and a petition to the Supreme Court was unsuccessful.

Married, with two children, Zuckerman lives in Bry-sur-Marne, France, and is a former member of the local city council. She is also the editor of Paris Writers News.
