= Zodiac balloon accident =

Deadly balloon crash in Noisy-le-Grand, France

Coordinates: 48°50′52″N 2°33′10″E

The Zodiac balloon accident was the crash of a French military balloon at Noisy-le-Grand, France, on 17 April 1913, which killed five.

== Accident ==
The spherical French military balloon Zodiac, inflated with "ordinary gas", departed from the Aero club park at St. Cloud, on 17 April 1913, shortly before 2 p.m., with five aboard, including "military aeronauts" Capt. Clavenad, Capt. De Noue, Lt. de Vaissalot, and Artilleryman Rechy, and civilian pilot Aumont-Thiéville. The craft was carried over Paris by a strong westerly wind towards Fontenay-sous-Bois. At 1430 hrs., M. Luisgnann, a cafe proprietor, observed the aeronauts throwing out ballast. The balloon was flying very low and a moment later the car of the balloon collided with a chimney and was thrown violently on its side. The car then cleared the chimney and the balloon proceeded.

The occupants signaled distress, some apparently injured. The balloon was then blown against the side of a house, crashed into some telegraph wires, and then was blown away towards Villiers-sur-Marne. A few minutes later an explosion was heard, and the car hurtled to the ground. Three of the aeronauts were killed outright, one died on the way to a hospital and the other died after reaching there.

Two officers - Lieutenant de None and Lieutenant Vassalot de Regne - and Sergeant Richy [note variation in spellings from another account] were dead. A civilian named Aumont Thieville died soon thereafter. The fifth victim, Captain Clavenad, expired at 9 p.m. on 17 April.

A wire service report gave the accident location as over Villiers-sur-Marne.

Hilaire de Vasselot de Régné was one of the victims. The civilian was Jacques Aumont-Thiéville.
