= Hôtel de Ville, Noisy-le-Grand =

Town hall in Noisy-le-Grand, France

Hôtel de Ville
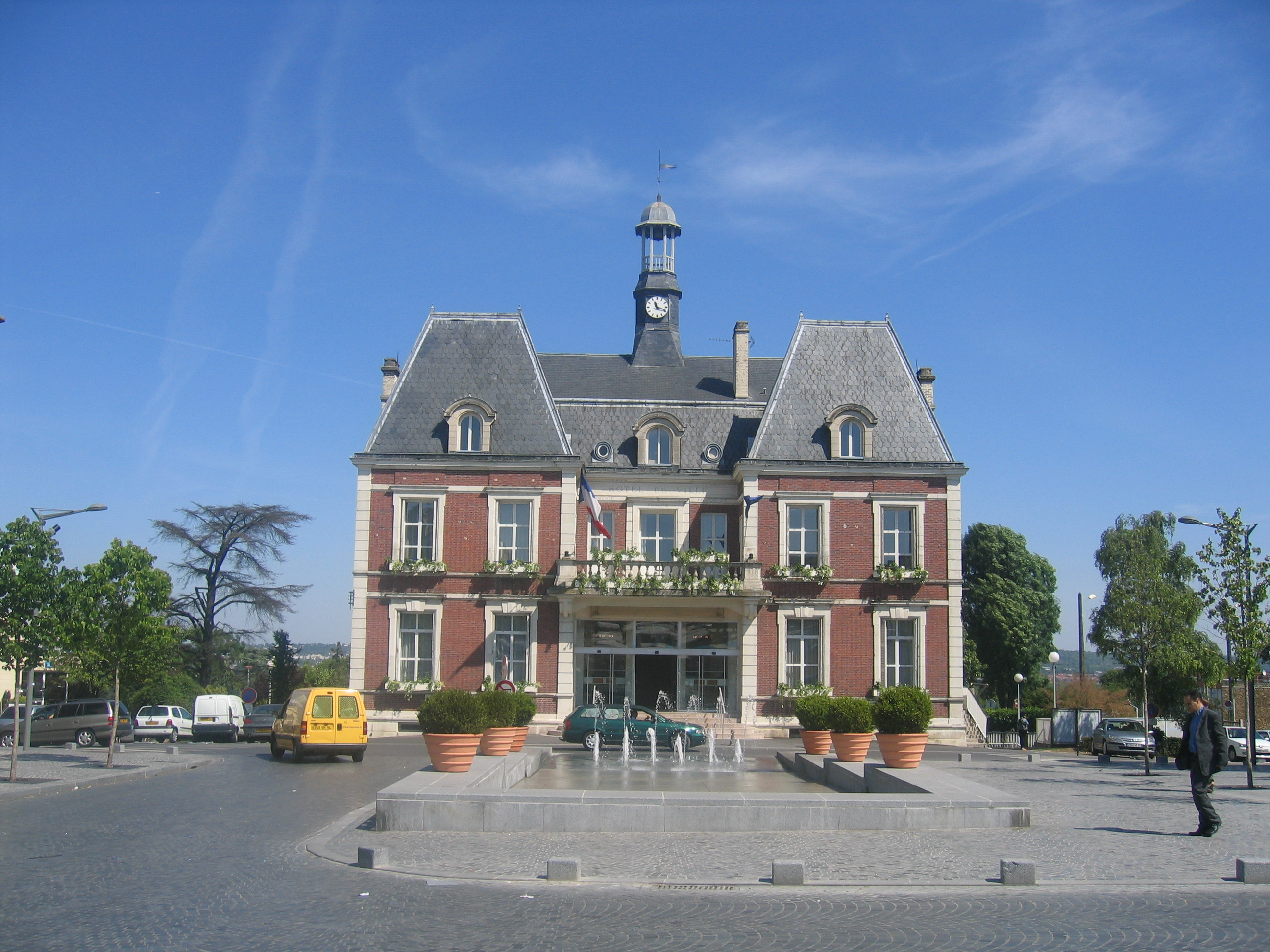
- The main frontage of the Hôtel de Ville in June 2006
- Interactive map of the Hôtel de Ville area

General information
- Type: City hall
- Architectural style: Neoclassical style
- Location: Noisy-le-Grand, France
- Coordinates: 48.8493°N 2.5525°E
- Completed: 1865

The Hôtel de Ville (French pronunciation: [otɛl də vil]; City Hall) is a municipal building in Noisy-le-Grand, Seine-Saint-Denis, in the eastern suburbs of Paris, standing on Avenue Émile-Cossonneau.

== History ==
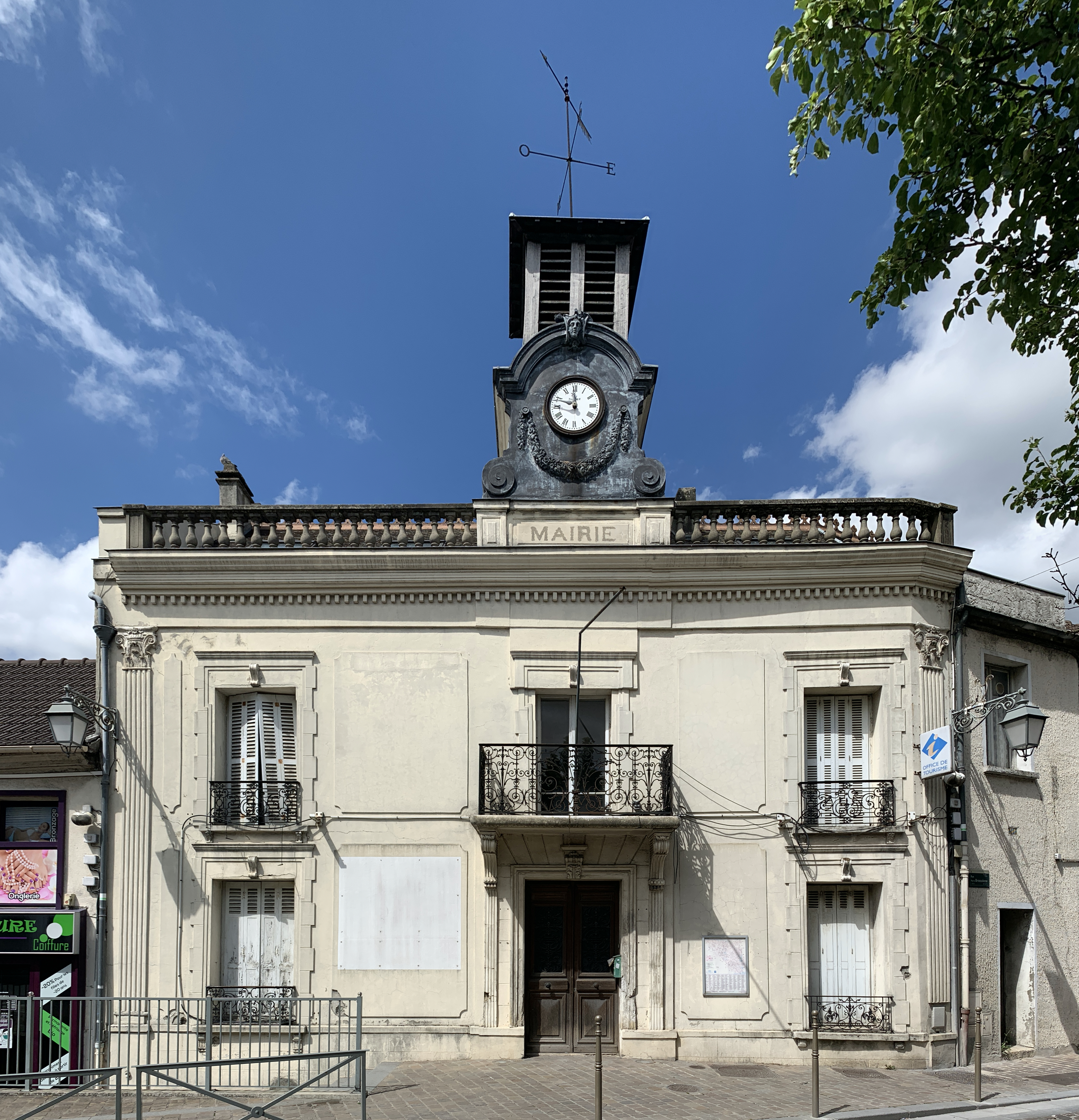
The old town hall

Following the French Revolution, the town council initially met at the private houses of successive mayors. However, in the 1830s, they decided to acquire a property for dedicated municipal use. The site they selected, on the corner of what is now Rue Pierre-Brossolette and Rue Pasteur, was owned by the Desvignes family. The building was designed in the neoclassical style and built in ashlar stone.

The design involved a symmetrical main frontage of three bays. The central bay featured a square headed doorway with voussoirs and a keystone and there were square headed windows with moulded surrounds in the other two bays on the ground floor, as well as the bays on the first floor. There were composite order pilasters, supporting an entablature, a modillioned cornice and a balustraded parapet, at the corners. The council acquired the building in 1841 and, after it had been converted for municipal use, the mayor, Pierre Ruffin, welcomed the first wedding guests to the building on 15 February 1843. The building subsequently accommodated a boys' school, a girls' school and a nursery school as well as the municipal offices.

The council staff, together with much of the local population, were evacuated to central Paris in 1870 during the Franco-Prussian War. The motto "Liberty – Equality – Fraternity" was carved into the entablature in 1884 and the French tricolour was flown from the flagpole continuously from 1892.

In the mid-1920s, the council decided to find larger premises. The site they selected, on what is now Avenue Émile-Cossonneau, was owned by the Périac family. The building was designed in the neoclassical style, built in red brick with stone dressings and completed in 1865. The design involved a symmetrical main frontage of seven bays with the last two bays at both ends projected forward as pavilions. The central bay featured a square headed doorway and there were square headed windows with moulded surrounds in the other two bays on the ground floor, as well as the bays on the first floor. There were pilasters supporting a cornice at the corners, and small dormer windows at attic level. The council acquired the building from François Augustin Périac and his wife, Sophie Louise Buisson, in 1926 and, after it had been converted for municipal use, it was officially re-opened by the mayor, Léon Bernard, in July 1927. Internally, the principal rooms were the Salle du Conseil (council chamber) and the Salle des Mariages (wedding room) on the ground floor, and the library and the municipal offices on the first floor. A small clock tower and belfry were added in 1931.

Following the liberation of the town by the French 2nd Armoured Division, commanded by General Philippe Leclerc, on 26 August 1944 during the Second World War, celebrations, including a parade, were held outside the town hall in the first week of September 1944.

Between 1947 and 1948, the building was reorganised internally with a grand staircase installed, the council chamber and the wedding room moved to the first floor, and the offices and public-facing staff moved to the ground floor. A balcony was also added to the main frontage. Following significant population growth, an extension on the north side, built largely underground, was completed in 1971. A much larger extension on the north side, involving an underground council chamber with a terrace above, was completed in January 2013. It also featured wings which stretched right back to Boulevard Paul Pambrun, on either side of the rear garden. The new structures were built to a design by Chaix & Morel et Associés and involved extensive use of vertical window slats to provide shade for the staff inside.

== Sources ==
- "Noisy et sa mairie, 150 ans d'histoire" (PDF). Town of Noisy-le-Grand. 2013.
