= Bund Sightseeing Tunnel =

Sightseeing tunnel in Shanghai

Shanghai Bund Sightseeing Tunnel
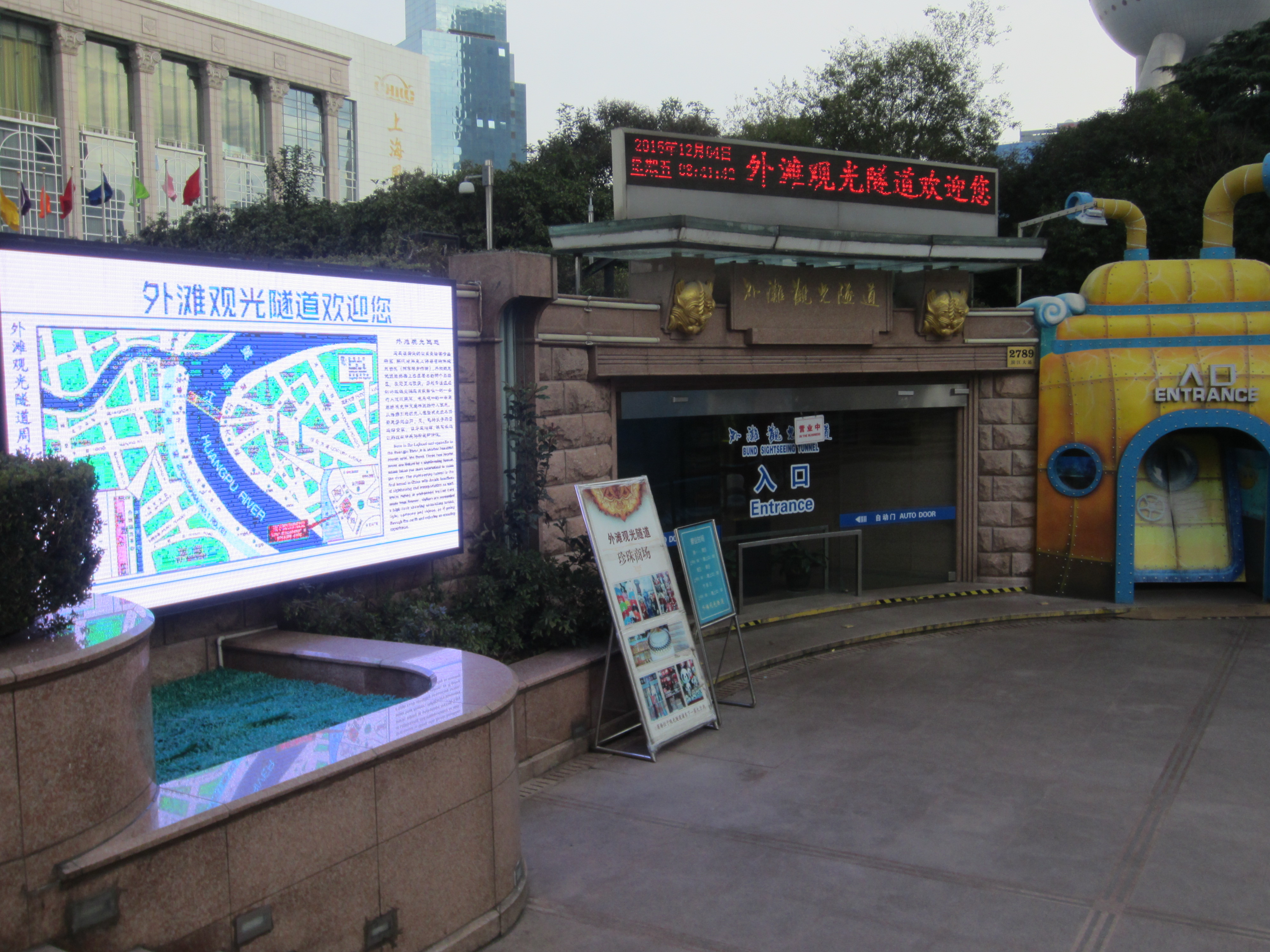
- Tunnel entrance, 2015

Overview
- Status: Operational
- Locale: Huangpu, Pudong, Shanghai
- Termini: Puxi Station: 300 Zhongshan East 1st Road (north of Chen Yi Square, east of Nanjing E. Rd.); Pudong Station: 2789 Binjiang Road (under the Oriental Pearl Tower)
- Stations: 2

Service
- Type: APM
- Services: Puxi Station ↔ Pudong Station
- Rolling stock: SK carriage SK6000

History
- Opened: January 2, 2001; 25 years ago

Technical
- Line length: 646.7 m (2,122 ft)
- Number of tracks: 2
- Character: Underground
- Operating speed: Approximately 7.8 km/h (5 mph)
Route map
Bund Sightseeing Tunnel:
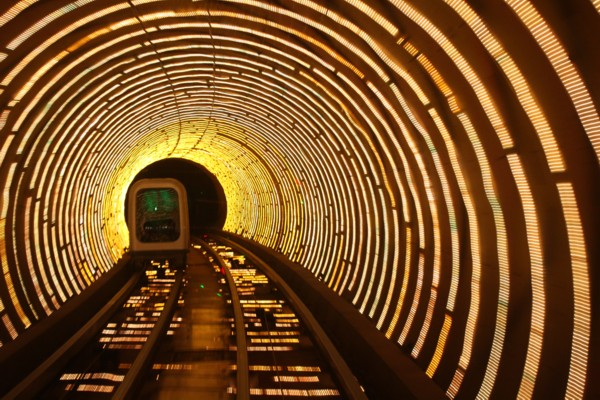
Bund Sightseeing Tunnel:
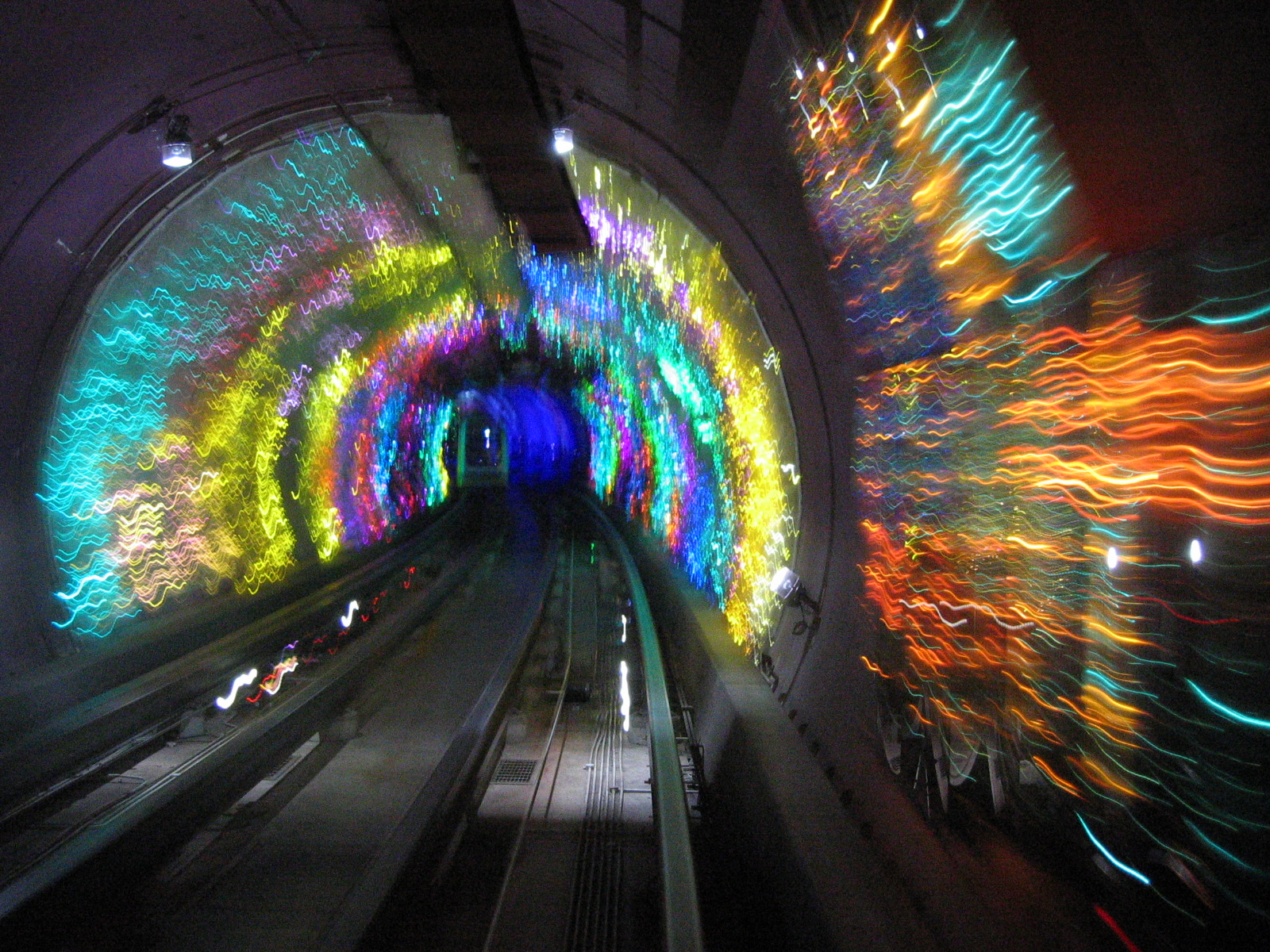

The Bund Sightseeing Tunnel is a tunnel connecting the Shanghai Bund and Pudong in Shanghai, China, which houses a cable-hauled passenger rail line.

== Overview ==
The rail line has a total length of 646.7 meters, with a station at each end. As of 2010, there were 14 passenger cars. Construction started in 1998 and trial operation began in October 2000. The tunnel is a single-hole double-lane tunnel, passing through the upper part of the Metro Line 2 tunnel near the end of Puxi.

The passenger-carrying system consists of unmanned SK carriages (SK 6000 type) imported from France. The fully automatic vehicles are towed by a cable, and there is a turning platform at the terminus to allow the carriages to turn around. There is an overhaul parking area at Pudong Station.

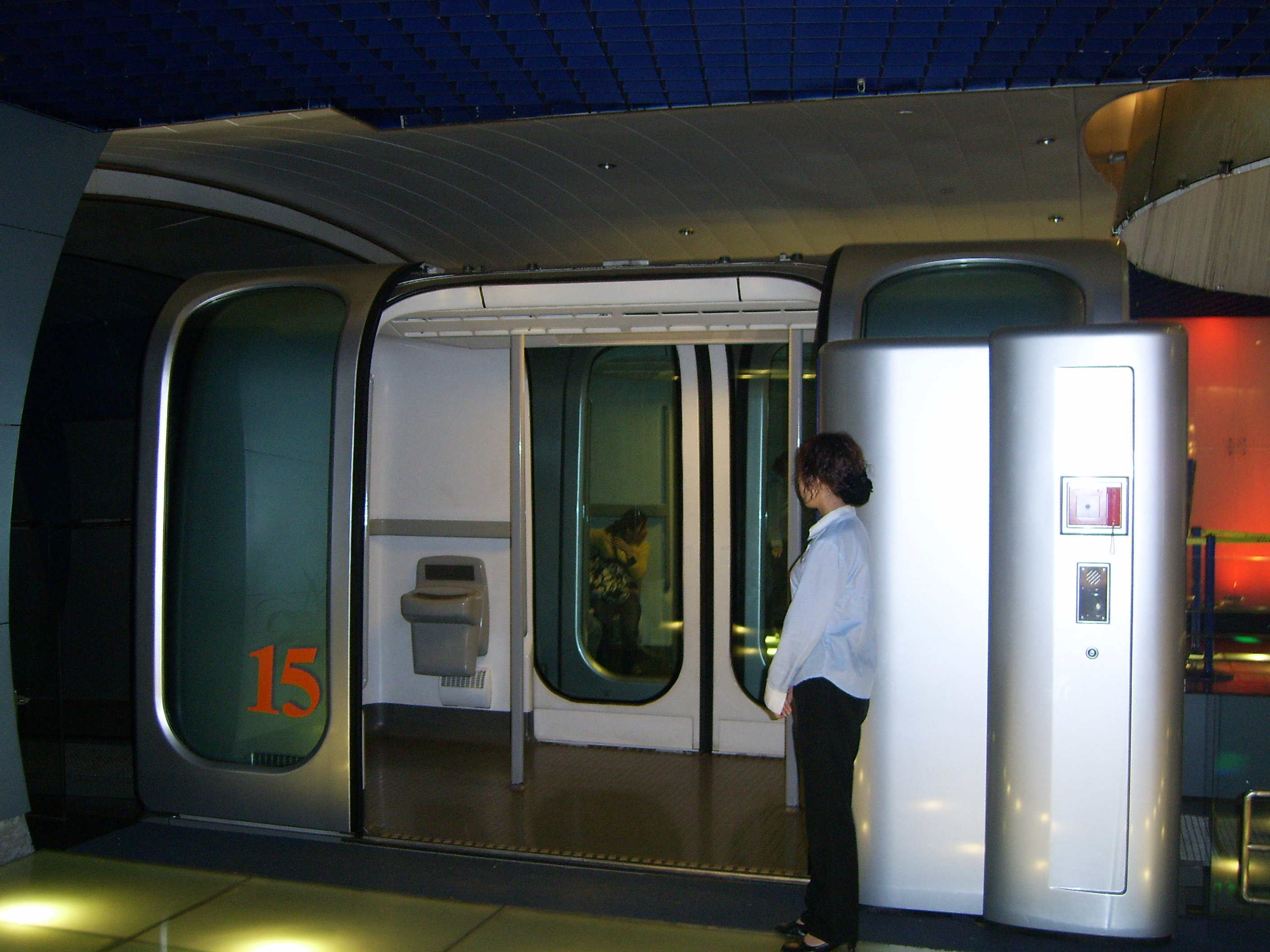
Unmanned SK carriage imported from France (SK 6000 type)

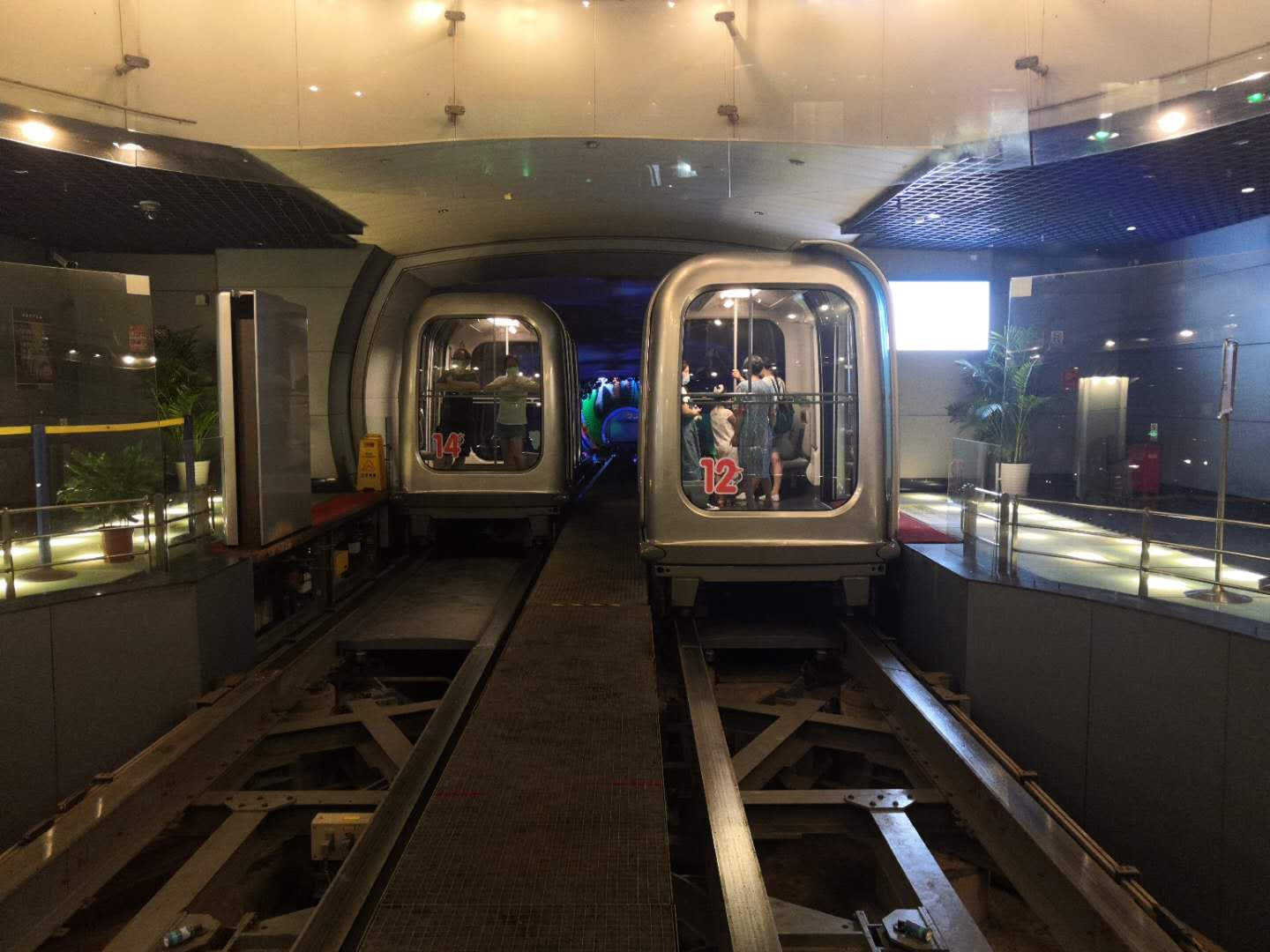
Two SK6000 cars of the Shanghai Bund Sightseeing Tunnel

The project was constructed as a tourist attraction and many tourists use it to cross the Huangpu River, even though it costs more than ten times the price of a metro ticket. Passengers are treated to a sound and light show during the journey, which takes between three and five minutes.

== See also ==
- Bund Tunnel, a road tunnel
