= Lycée Flora Tristan (Noisy-le-Grand) =

Lycée Flora-Tristan

Location
- 27 Rue des Hauts Roseaux; Noisy-le-Grand, Île-de-France, 93160; France; 48°50′37″N 2°34′27″E

Information
- Type: Public high school
- Principal: Éric Schlegel
- Grades: Sophomore Year, Junior Year, Senior Year
- Colors: Blue and fuchsia
- Team name: Lycée Flora Tristan
- Newspaper: Flora's Time
- Website: lyceefloratristan.fr

Lycée Flora Tristan is a French senior high school/sixth-form college in Noisy-le-Grand, in the Paris metropolitan area.

In September 2026 there was a teachers' strike at the start of the school term, when all 32 students in one class turned out to have been repeating their previous year in the class.
