= Lycée Évariste Galois (Noisy-le-Grand) =

Lycée Évariste-Galois

Information
- Type: Public high school

Lycée Évariste-Galois is a lycée in Noisy-le-Grand, Seine-Saint-Denis, France.
