= Noisy-le-Grand =

- Commune
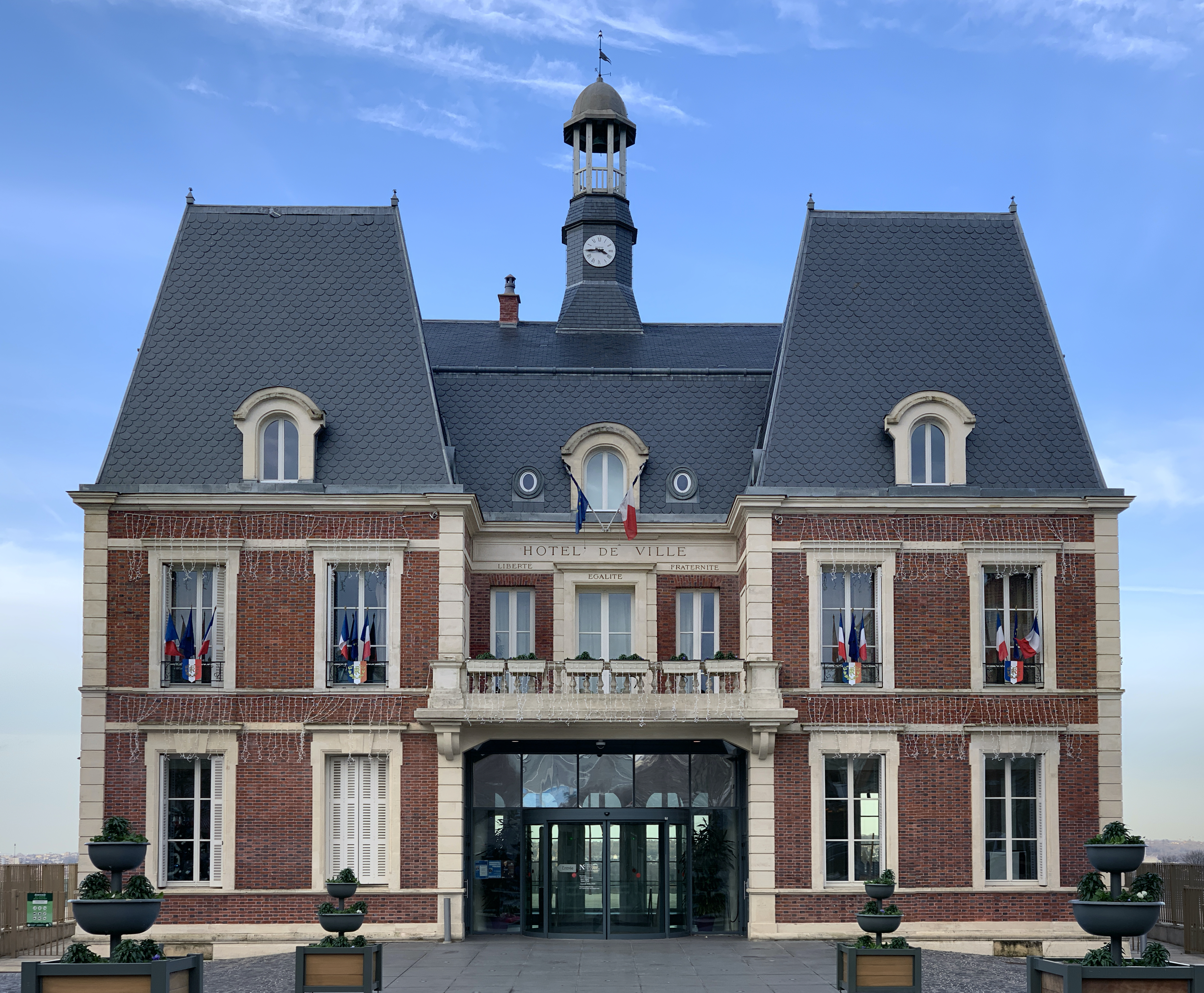
- The Hôtel de Ville

- Coat of arms

- Location (in red) within Paris inner suburbs
- Location of Noisy-le-Grand
- Location within France Location within Île-de-France (region)
- Coordinates: 48°50′52″N 2°33′10″E
- Country: France
- Region: Île-de-France
- Department: Seine-Saint-Denis
- Arrondissement: Le Raincy
- Canton: Noisy-le-Grand
- Intercommunality: Grand Paris

Government
  - Mayor (2026–32): Vincent Monnier
- Area^{1}: 12.95 km^{2} (5.00 sq mi)
- Highest elevation: 113 m (371 ft)
- Lowest elevation: 36 m (118 ft)
- Population (2023): 72,978
  - Density: 5,635/km^{2} (14,600/sq mi)
- Demonym: Noiséens
- Time zone: UTC+01:00 (CET)
  - Summer (DST): UTC+02:00 (CEST)
- INSEE/Postal code: 93051 /93160
- Website: www.noisylegrand.fr
- ^{1} French Land Register data, which excludes lakes, ponds, glaciers > 1 km^{2} (0.386 sq mi or 247 acres) and river estuaries.

Noisy-le-Grand (French pronunciation: [nwazi lə ɡʁɑ̃]; lit. 'Noisy-the-Great') or simply Noisy is a commune in the eastern outer suburbs of Paris, France.

It is located 15.2 km (9.4 mi) from the centre of Paris, on the left bank of the Marne in Seine-Saint-Denis on the departmental border with both Val-de-Marne and Seine-et-Marne. The commune of Noisy-le-Grand is part of the sector of Porte de Paris, one of the four sectors of the "new town" of Marne-la-Vallée.

Some of the postmodern architecture in the commune has been used as a shooting location in movies including Brazil and The Hunger Games.

== Name ==
The name Noisy comes from Medieval Latin nucetum, meaning "walnut grove", after the walnut trees (French: noyers) covering the territory of Noisy-le-Grand in ancient times.

The epithet "le-Grand" (Medieval Latin: Magnum), meaning "the Great", was added in the Middle Ages, probably to distinguish Noisy-le-Grand from the smaller settlement of Noisy-le-Sec, which was sometimes referred to as Nucenum Minus ("Noisy the Small").

== Demographics ==
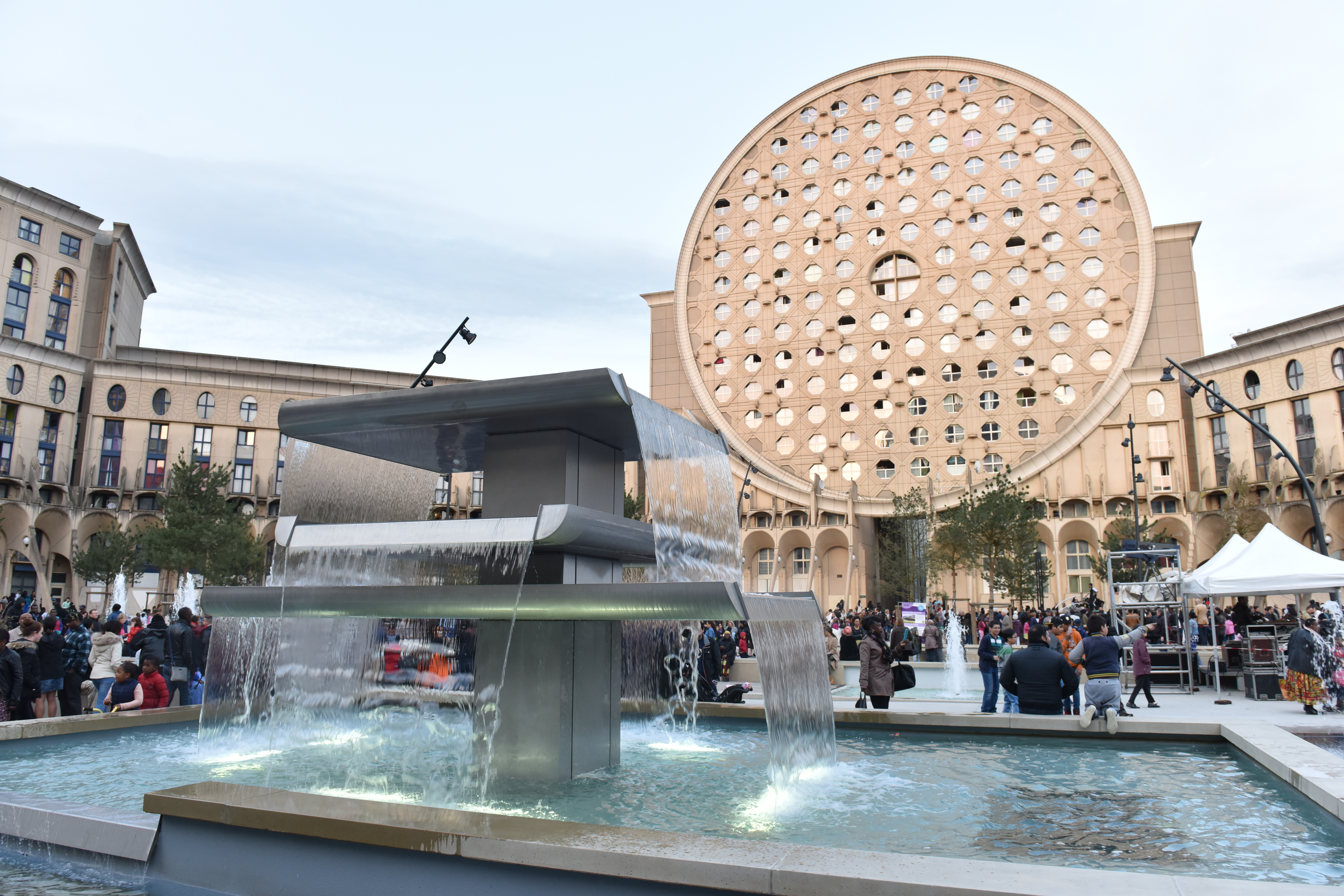
The Arenes Picasso in the Noisy-Le-Grand.

Like many other Seine-Saint-Denis cities, the commune is very cosmopolitan, home of many communities, with many of its locals coming from various continents and countries. It has a large African population, mostly from sub-Saharan countries (Senegal, Mali, Ivory Coast and many others) and East Asian countries, such as China, Vietnam and Cambodia. The city also includes significant, but less numerous, communities from Portugal and North African countries like Morocco and Algeria. Recently, the department, and the Parisian suburbs in general, has seen a new wave of immigration coming from Eastern Europe. Noisy-le-Grand now has communities from former Eastern Bloc countries like Romania, Bulgaria and Russia.

As of 1998 there were 2,700 East Asians in Noisy le Grand, making up about 5-6% of the city; many of them lived in the same complexes occupied by Africans and other foreigners, and Asians were widely distributed around the commune.

Historical population

Year	Pop.	±% p.a.
1793	986	—
1800	1,074	+1.23%
1806	1,052	−0.34%
1821	1,124	+0.44%
1831	1,171	+0.41%
1836	1,169	−0.03%
1841	1,079	−1.59%
1846	1,116	+0.68%
1851	1,132	+0.29%
1856	1,063	−1.25%
1861	1,258	+3.43%
1866	1,341	+1.29%
1872	1,248	−1.19%
1876	1,334	+1.68%
1881	1,394	+0.88%
1886	1,875	+6.11%
1891	1,799	−0.82%
1896	1,771	−0.31%
1901	1,797	+0.29%

Year	Pop.	±% p.a.
1906	2,112	+3.28%
1911	2,211	+0.92%
1921	2,584	+1.57%
1926	4,425	+11.36%
1931	6,407	+7.68%
1936	7,050	+1.93%
1946	6,808	−0.35%
1954	10,398	+5.44%
1962	16,813	+6.19%
1968	25,440	+7.15%
1975	26,662	+0.67%
1982	40,585	+6.19%
1990	54,032	+3.64%
1999	58,217	+0.83%
2007	62,529	+0.90%
2012	62,592	+0.02%
2017	68,183	+1.73%
2023	72,978	+1.14%

Source: EHESS and INSEE (1968-2023)

== Administration ==
The canton of Noisy-le-Grand comprises two communes: Noisy-le-Grand and Gournay-sur-Marne. The Hôtel de Ville was completed in 1865.

== Economy ==
Previously Star Airlines (now XL Airways France) had its headquarters in the Immeuble Horizon building in the commune. Cédric Pastrour, the founder of the airline, said that the company chose the Noisy site because the airline did not yet know which airport, Charles de Gaulle Airport or Orly Airport, would serve as the airline's base, and that the Noisy site was equidistant to both airports. Pastour added that the Noisy site had access to the A4 and the A86 autoroutes and was close to the Francilienne, and that the costs in the Noisy area were lower than the costs in the airport area.

== Education ==
The commune has municipal preschools and elementary schools.

Junior high schools:

- Collège du Clos Saint-Vincent
- Collège François-Mitterrand
- Collège Françoise-Cabrini
- Collège international
- Collège Jacques-Prévert
- Collège Saint-Exupéry
- Collège Victor-Hugo

Senior high schools/sixth form colleges:

- Lycée Évariste-Galois (Noisy-le-Grand)
- Lycée Flora-Tristan (Noisy-le-Grand)
- Lycée Françoise-Cabrini (Noisy-le-Grand)
- Lycée International de l'Est Parisien (Noisy-le-Grand)

== Transport ==
Noisy-le-Grand is served by two stations on Paris RER line A: Noisy-le-Grand–Mont d'Est station and Noisy–Champs station.

Noisy-le-Grand is also served by Les Yvris–Noisy-le-Grand station on Paris RER line E.

== Heraldry ==
arms of Noisy-le-Grand	arms of Noisy-le-Grand : Azure, on a chevron Or an antique crown azure, between 3 nuts, and a base of waves argent.

== Notable people ==
- Alexis Claude-Maurice, footballer
- Steve Hérélius, boxer
- Steven Moreira, footballer
- Johan Passave-Ducteil, basketball player
- Théophile Poilpot, painter
- Wesley Said, footballer
- Jean-Marc Théolleyre, (1924–2001), French journalist, winner of the 1959 Prix Albert Londres, died in Noisy-le-Grand

== See also ==
- Communes of the Seine-Saint-Denis department
- Zodiac balloon accident, 1913 – crash of a military balloon
