= Abbé Pierre sexual abuse scandal =

Sexual abuse by founder of Emmaus

The Abbé Pierre sexual abuse scandal regards the numerous sexual assaults that French Catholic priest and Emmaus charity organization founder Abbé Pierre allegedly committed over a period from the 1950s to the 2000s, in addition to the complicity and lack of action by multiple religious and humanitarian organizations associated with Pierre towards such cases until 2024. These cases were revealed on 17 July 2024 by the publication of a report commissioned from the Egaé firm by Emmaüs International.

== Publication of the report ==
On 17 July 2024, Emmaüs International published an eight-page report commissioned from the Egaé firm and written by its creator, feminist activist Caroline De Haas. This report follows the testimony of the daughter of a couple close to Abbé Pierre, who came to first meet Véronique Margron, president of the conference of religious men and women of France, before meeting with the leaders of the Emmaüs association in June 2023. She denounced "serious acts" committed against her in the early 1980s when she was sixteen or seventeen years old.

The report presents the testimonies of seven women reporting "behavior that could be considered sexual assault or sexual harassment" by Abbé Pierre between the end of the 1970s and 2005, one of them being a minor at the time of her first case of victimization. Two testimonies mentioned in the report stated that the victims had first brought their cases to the Emmaüs management in 1992 and 1995, and that the association never followed up with them. The report notes "a form of control, fueled by the age difference, the status of Abbé Pierre and a form of idolatry, or the situation of subordination between him and others (immediate family and co-workers)". According to the daily newspaper La Croix, "this report reveals a man of the Church who does not stop himself from seeking to satisfy his urges, feeling authorized to commit acts reprehensible by the law of the time."

On 20 July, an eighth woman testified on France Inter to a sexual assault in 2006, when Abbé Pierre was 93 years old and was being treated in a Parisian military hospital. According to the testimony of this nurse, two or three of her colleagues also had to undergo the same treatment. The facts had not been made public prior due to the victim initially ascribing Abbé Pierre's behavior to his advanced age, completely unaware at the time that Abbé Pierre had committed the same acts for decades. The testimonies collected present many similarities, which in particular involved repeated touching of the chest done usually when Abbé Pierre was alone with his victims, while seeming to exercise psychological control over them.

On 24 July, a source close to the case announced that the Egaé platform had collected around ten new testimonies.

== Tribune by CIASE researchers ==
On 20 July, following the publication of the report, the daily newspaper Le Monde published an opinion piece by four researchers who worked with the Independent Commission on Sexual Abuse in the Church (CIASE) from 2019 to 2021. Philippe Portier, who chaired the historical work of CIASE, political scientist Anne Lancien, and historians Paul Airiau and Thomas Boulu wrote that they were not surprised by the revelations in the report commissioned by Emmaüs and the Abbé-Pierre Foundation. In fact, among the 1,200 testimonies sent to the CIASE that they had to process, three implicated Abbé Pierre. These three signed testimonies were deemed coherent and written without consultation between their authors. One of them appears in the report published in 2024 on Abbé Pierre.

The researchers believed that "Abbé Pierre's sexual compulsion leading to repeated aggression seems indubitable. Archival data and testimonies are numerous and consistent. This compulsion never really ceased. [The case of] Abbé Pierre also confirms, if it were necessary, that sexual deviance in the Catholic clergy was very equally distributed across all tendencies, progressive or intransigent ." They also questioned the voluntary silence of the Catholic hierarchy and the organizations founded by Abbé Pierre: "The informed bishops and the leaders of Emmaüs stifled the affairs. The concealment created a shared secret, to the detriment of the assaulted, who were never taken into account. [...] The bishops of the 1950s did not take any canonical sanctions. [...] The leaders of Emmaüs were content to unofficially and elliptically warn women working for Emmaüs."

=== Reactions of the Catholic Church ===
On 26 July 2024, President of the Conference of Bishops of France Éric de Moulins-Beaufort, speaking in an op-ed published in Le Figaro, believes that the text of the four researchers "affects, whatever one may say, the honor of the thousands of priests and deacons [...] in France [and] once again casts suspicion on the bishops, accused more or less explicitly of having 'covered up the affair'." He believed that "a careful study of the archives will be necessary to understand how Abbé Pierre then received the measures taken, whether he respected them or not, and how they were followed by the ecclesiastical authorities concerned."

According to one of the CIASE researchers who signed the article, the Diocese of Grenoble, to which Abbé Pierre belonged, "acknowledged having data, without having communicated it" which was also affirmed by the researcher Axelle Brodiez-Dolino when interviewed by the magazine La Vie: "the file of Abbé [Pierre] at the bishopric of Grenoble is surprisingly blank. There are only a few pages relating to the Resistance. I searched in vain for the other documents: they have disappeared...". In response to the article, the head of the communications department of the diocese of Grenoble denied the claims on July 26: "During the visit of one of the four signatories of the article, on 20 June 2020, the requested archives were made fully available to the CIASE. [...] The diocese of Grenoble-Vienne refutes any desire to obstruct or withhold information."

== Older testimonies ==
The investigation by La Vie magazine, published on the day the report was published, reports older known testimonies dating back to the 1950s and 1960s. According to some sources, Abbé Pierre had his first sexual relationship with a woman during the war while he was in the French Resistance. His popularity, with the creation of Emmaüs in 1949 and his public appeal from the "Uprising of Kindness" in 1954, gave rise to numerous sexual escapades.

=== Trip to the United States in April–May 1955 ===
After his highly publicized appeal on 1 February 1954, Abbé Pierre left for the United States on 19 April 1955. Jacques Maritain, former French ambassador to the Holy See and professor at Princeton University, was in charge of organizing this tour in several American cities from the East Coast to Los Angeles. Television appearances and a conference at the United Nations headquarters were also planned. Abbé Pierre arrived in New York on 25 April where he was welcomed by Maritain and Cardinal Francis Spellman, the local archbishop, who gave the priest a check for US$2,000. On 6 and 7 May, Maritain was notified by two "panicked" American priests of complaints from two women in New York about Abbé Pierre, who was then in Chicago with a student of Maritain's, Marshall Suther. They claimed that the priest had made sexual advances towards them. Abbé Pierre, for his part, told Maritain by telephone the same day that this was "a matter of minor imprudence." Three days later, Marshall Suther made this revelation to Maritain, which the latter noted in his notebooks: "One cannot understand the amount of follies [committed by Abbé Pierre] with unknown women, not only in New York but also in Paris." Spellman and the Archbishop of Chicago, Cardinal Samuel Alphonsus Stritch, were alerted to the advances made.

On 12 May 1955, Maritain advocated that Abbé Pierre hastily return to Paris from Chicago by a direct flight in order to avoid scandal. Other complaints were also reported in Chicago and Washington. Abbé Pierre tried to evade his exfiltration by returning to New York and, against Maritain's wishes, even extended his trip across the Atlantic to Quebec. An American Jesuit recommended that Maritain meet Spellman to assure him that Cardinal Maurice Feltin, Archbishop of Paris, had been notified, so that Abbé Pierre would never return to the United States. Two other French bishops were aware of the events that took place during this shortened trip: André-Jacques Fougerat, then Bishop of Grenoble, the diocese on which Abbé Pierre depended, and Bishop of Versailles Alexandre Renard who had several communities of the Emmaüs movement under his jurisdiction.

Jacques Maritain, who returned to France in the summer of 1955, drew the attention of the Catholic hierarchy to the case of Abbé Pierre with the help of René Voillaume, who was summoned on 7 September by Cardinal Feltin to report his actions. The founder of Emmaüs then alternated between retreats and stays in clinics until his internment in 1957–58 within a Swiss psychiatric institute in Prangins imposed by the bishops who had been informed of his situation. They stated: "Deviant priests are usually taken care of in France by the Secours sacerdotal, so the relocation suggests how seriously the matter is taken." He was removed from the Emmaüs community in 1957, and placed under the guardianship of two socius ("both chaperone and spiritual advisor"), one of which was the Jesuit Jacques Monnier. The bishops limited his travels: his schedule was monitored by Julien Gouet, secretary of the Assembly of Cardinals and Archbishops of France. However, no canonical sanction was taken against him. The civil authorities were warned: while Edmond Michelet was preparing in 1958 to promote Abbé Pierre to the rank of officer of the Legion of Honour, Cardinal Feltin wrote to him to dissuade him: "It is better not to speak of this abbé. He has had some fortunate initiatives, but it seems preferable, at present, to keep quiet about him." The General Intelligence Service opened a file on the priest concerning his morals. Lucie Coutaz, secretary to Abbé Pierre, co-founder of Emmaüs, and the only one in the movement at the time to be aware of the priest's misconduct, was distressed and worried about this situation which put the organization's work in danger if the facts became known to the public. A policy of silence was then put in place to protect it.

=== 1960s ===
In his book of memoirs Peasant of the Right Bank, published in July 2023, a year before the publication of the report, theologian André Paul mentioned cases of harassment by Abbé Pierre against women, which the author would have passed over in silence without "the recent revelations of the sexual ignominies of such unsuspected personalities as Jean Vanier and Abbé Jean-François Six." According to André Paul, Abbé Pierre allegedly acted perversely towards women in charge of the hotel in a religious community in Sweden, a country where he had been invited to in 1958 and where he made occasional stays, to the point that "the superior allegedly demanded that in the future he should only return accompanied by [his] socius."

In 1961, he was sent to Beni Abbès in Algeria for a spiritual retreat. For the researchers of the CIASE, this measure "follows the logic of behavioral reform applied by the Church to deviant priests and sexual aggressors."

According to André Paul, other events took place in Quebec in 1963 while Abbé Pierre was promoting the Emmaus fraternities: "The matter was settled amicably between the local police and the ecclesiastical authorities."

=== 1980s ===
Despite the great vigilance of Lucie Coutaz and the surveillance of the man who succeeded her after her death in 1982, Abbé Pierre "continued his risky behavior." Thus, two testimonies received by the CIASE concern cases of sexual assault committed in 1980 on an employee of Emmaüs, and in 1981 on a woman in Namur, Belgium, during a conference given by Abbé Pierre. In 2005, the second woman sent a letter to the Order of Capuchins, to which Abbé Pierre belonged, in which she asked the priest to apologize for his inappropriate actions. The Order forwarded it to the Diocese of Grenoble, where Abbé Pierre had been incardinated in 1939, which took no action. On 25 August 2024, the Bishop of Grenoble, Jean-Marc Eychenne, announced to the Dauphiné Libéré that he had found the 2005 letter by consulting the archives of his diocese. Two days earlier, members of an association defending victims of incest and sexual violence had demonstrated in front of the bishopric of Grenoble to demand an investigation into the acts committed by Abbé Pierre.

In a book published in 2007 entitled L'Abbé Père, Jean-Christophe d'Escaut, who was from a family welcomed into the first Emmaüs community in Neuilly-Plaisance (Seine-Saint-Denis), accused the priest of having tried to touch his sister's breasts in 1984. The singer Sandra Slag also claimed in her book Le Saint et la Pécheresse published in 2008 that the priest undressed in front of her and her daughter in 1985, and did it a second time in 1991 with her only.

According to another testimony received by CIASE, a woman aged 34 at the time, "E. de C.", asked Father Pierre for help in finding accommodation in 1989 while she was in a precarious financial situation. She had just left Canada for France after divorcing her husband due to domestic violence. The priest installed her in the guesthouse of the Saint-Wandrille Abbey (Seine-Maritime) and paid her son's board for his position for The Little Singers of Paris. She reported that Pierre took advantage of her situation to make her his "sexual object" in his Parisian apartment between 1989 and 1990: he masturbated in front of her, demanded fellatio, asked her to whip him and suggested that another woman join them so he could watch their lesbian romps. It was while watching the documentary Religious Abused, the Other Scandal of the Church that "E. de C." decided to give her testimony to the CIASE in 2019, shortly before her death.

Referring to his appointment in 2010 as director of the Abbé-Pierre d'Esteville center (Seine-Maritime), where the founder of Emmaüs is buried, Philippe Dupont reports that "some people who had known [Abbé Pierre] [to him] very quickly spoke about his relationships with women." The abbé's behavior was known within Emmaüs. According to one of the witnesses heard by the firm that produced the report, "it was not an epiphenomenon." The daily newspaper La Croix reports that "several women also claim to have reported the facts within the movement." An Emmaüs employee indicated that "the instruction was given to her female colleagues not to go see Abbé Pierre alone."

According to Axelle Brodiez-Dolino, a historian of poverty in France and author of the book Emmaüs et l'Abbé Pierre published in 2009, "Abbé Pierre had difficulty restraining his desire for women throughout his life." She considers the report "very convergent from one testimony to another". In this book, she had documented the priest's sexual compulsions known from the 1950s-1960s, which according to her constituted an "open secret" at the time.

A biographer and close friend of Abbé Pierre, Pierre Lunel reported in his book published in 1992, 40 ans d'amour, what he calls the "deviations of the Father" and his "misconduct". He writes on this subject: "Emmaus is at the mercy of the slightest revelation, but the strength of the myth ensures that the law of silence observed by those close to him is respected outside. The press has contributed too much to building the statue of the abbé to deny itself by breaking it."

== Reactions ==
=== Reactions from Emmaüs and the Abbé-Pierre Foundation ===
In a press release, Emmaüs International, Emmaüs France and the Abbé-Pierre Foundation "salute the courage of the people who have testified and helped, through their words, to bring these realities to light." The Foundation's general delegate, Christophe Robert, says he is shocked by the discovery of such acts and "angry": "I blame Abbé Pierre for having made these women suffer in this way and I salute the courage they had to testify."

=== Reactions from those close to Abbé Pierre ===
Former president of the Emmaüs communities and then of Emmaüs France between 1995 and 2007, Martin Hirsch says he learned from historical members of the movement of what was presented as the "impulses" and "illness" of Abbé Pierre. According to him, "the most shocking thing is that Abbé Pierre's motto was 'serve first those who suffer the most', and we now see that he created suffering among people who could not defend themselves." He argues that "one of the main lessons to be learned from this revelation is that the defense of the most vulnerable cannot be done in a lawless zone[fr]. Abbé Pierre founded the Emmaüs communities as a utopia on the fringes of legality. Since social rules did not know how to find a place for the excluded, the communities would dispense with the rules, the spirit of solidarity taking their place." In his opinion, which he also attributes to the leaders of the Emmaus movement, "the best tribute to pay to the victims is to continue the fight against poverty."

Biographer and close friend of Abbé Pierre, Pierre Lunel, without questioning or doubting the complaints that were made, claims to have never received any complaints. According to him, "we must not imagine Abbé Pierre in the shoes of a galloping seducer. His impulses, his desires, he lived them painfully. For him, it was a sin." A member of the movement since 1982 and confessor of Abbé Pierre, Jean-Marie Viennet indicates that he knew "his difficulties regarding his relationship with women", but declares to have "never heard of any assaults or rapes". Another close friend of Abbé Pierre, Bernard Kouchner, when interviewed on 4 August 2024 by the daily newspaper Le Monde, described the accusations as "ridiculous": "I remember talking about women several times with him. It remained completely vague. [It] is very damaging to focus on this when we know that the Church is being criticized for much more serious and much more specific things. The story of Abbé Pierre does not seem to me to be of any profound gravity."

== See also ==
- Catholic Church sexual abuse cases
- Jimmy Savile sexual abuse scandal
- Religious abuse
- Spiritual abuse
