= Abbé Pierre =

French Roman Catholic priest (1912–2007)

The Reverend Abbé Pierre
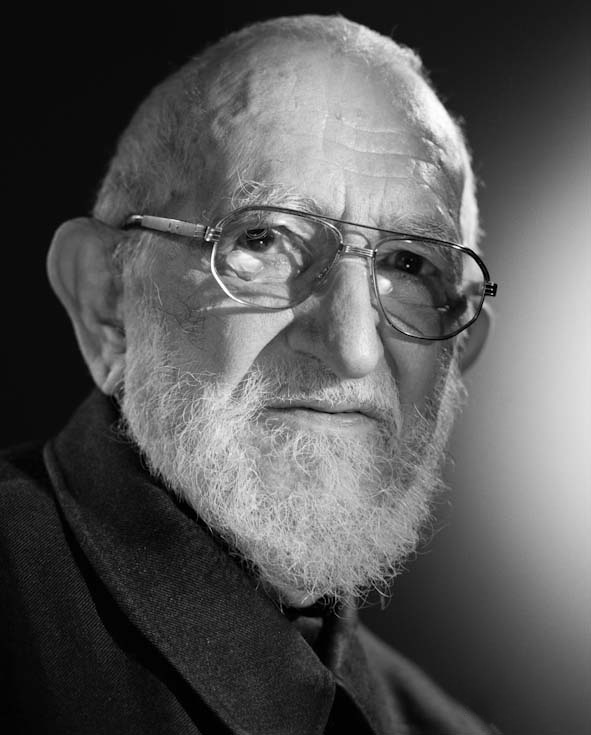
- Pierre in 1999
- Born: Henri Marie Joseph Grouès; 5 August 1912; Lyon, France
- Died: 22 January 2007 (aged 94); Paris, France
- Known for: Founder of Emmaus
- Political party: MRP

Member of the National Assembly for Meurthe-et-Moselle
- In office 1 October 1945 – 4 July 1951

Abbé Pierre (born Henri Marie Joseph Grouès; 5 August 1912 – 22 January 2007) was a French Catholic priest. He was a member of the Resistance during World War II and deputy of the Popular Republican Movement. In 1949, he founded the Emmaus movement, with the goal of helping poor and homeless people. For several decades, he was one of the most popular public figures in France. Allegations that he had sexually abused dozens of women, as well as several underage girls, emerged in 2024 and 2025.

== Youth and education ==
Grouès was born on 5 August 1912 in Lyon, France to a wealthy Catholic family of silk traders, the fifth of eight children. The writer and murderer Héra Mirtel was one of his aunts. He spent his childhood in Irigny, near Lyon. He was twelve when he met François Chabbey and went for the first time with his father to an Order circle, the brotherhood of the "Hospitaliers veilleurs" in which the mainly middle-class members would serve the poor by providing barber services.

Grouès became a member of the Scouts de France in which he was nicknamed "Meditative Beaver" (Castor méditatif). In 1928, aged 16, he made the decision to join a monastic order, but he had to wait until he was seventeen and a half to fulfill this ambition. In 1931, Grouès entered the Capuchin Order, renouncing his inheritance and offering all his possessions to charity.

Known as frère Philippe (Brother Philippe), he entered the monastery of Crest in 1932, where he lived for seven years and was ordained a priest on 24 August 1938. He had to leave in 1939 after developing severe lung infections, which made monastic life difficult. He became a chaplain to the sick at several places and then was made curate of Grenoble's cathedral in April 1939.

The theologian Henri de Lubac told him on the day of his priestly ordination: "Ask the Holy Spirit to grant you the same anti-clericalism of the saints".

== World War II ==
When World War II broke out in 1939, he was mobilised as a non-commissioned officer in the train transport corps. According to his official biography, he helped Jewish people to escape Nazi persecution following the July 1942 mass arrests in Paris, called the Rafle du Vel' d'Hiv, and another raid in the area of Grenoble in the non-occupied zone: "In July 1942, two fleeing Jews asked him for help. Having discovered the persecution taking place, he immediately went to learn how to make false passports. Starting in August 1942, he guided Jewish people to Switzerland".

His pseudonym dates from his work with the French Resistance during the Second World War, when he operated under several different names. Based in Grenoble, an important center of the Resistance, he helped Jews and politically persecuted escape to Switzerland. In 1942, he assisted Jacques de Gaulle (the brother of Charles de Gaulle) and his wife escape to Switzerland.

He participated in establishing a section of the maquis where he officially became one of the local leaders in the Vercors Plateau and in the Chartreuse Mountains. He helped people to avoid being taken into the Service du travail obligatoire (STO), the Nazi forced-labour program agreed upon with Pierre Laval, by creating in Grenoble the first refuge for resistants to the STO; he founded the clandestine newspaper L'Union patriotique indépendante. For a time, in 1943, he was given shelter by Lucie Coutaz, a Resistance member who later became his secretary and was his assistant in his charity work until her death in 1982.

He was arrested twice, once in 1944 by the Nazi police in the town of Cambo-les-Bains in the Pyrénées-Atlantiques, but was quickly released and travelled to Spain then Gibraltar before joining the Free French Forces of General de Gaulle in Algeria. In the Free North Africa, he became a chaplain in the French Navy on the battleship Jean Bart in Casablanca. He had become an important symbol of the French Resistance.

== Political career (1945–1951) and the 1960s–1970s ==
When the war was over, following de Gaulle's entourage's advice and the approbation of the archbishop of Paris, Abbé Pierre was elected deputy for Meurthe-et-Moselle department in both National Constituent Assemblies in 1945–1946 as an independent close to the Popular Republican Movement (MRP), mainly consisting of Christian democratic members of the Resistance. In 1946, he was re-elected as a member of the National Assembly, but this time as a member of the MRP. Abbé Pierre became vice-president of the World Federalist Movement in 1947, a universal federalist movement.

After a bloody accident resulting in the death of a blue-collar worker, Édouard Mazé, in Brest in 1950, Henri Antoine Grouès decided to put an end to his MRP affiliation on 28 April 1950, writing a letter titled "Pourquoi je quitte le MRP" ("Why I'm leaving the MRP"), where he denounced the political and social attitude of the MRP party. He then joined the Christian socialist movement named Ligue de la jeune République, created in 1912 by Marc Sangnier, but decided to finally end his political career. In 1951, before the end of his mandate, he returned to his first vocation: helping the homeless. With the modest funds he had received as a deputy, he invested in a run-down house near Paris in the Neuilly-Plaisance neighbourhood, repairing the whole house. He made it the first Emmaus base (because, according to him, it was simply too big for one person).

Although the priest had left representative politics, preferring to invest his energies in the Emmaus charity movement, he never completely abandoned the political field, taking strong stances on many and various subjects. Thus, when the decolonization movement was slowly beginning to emerge in the whole world, he attempted in 1956 to convince Tunisian leader Habib Bourguiba to obtain independence without using violence. Present in various international conferences at the end of the 1950s, he met Colombian priest Camilo Torres (1929–1966), a predecessor of Liberation theology, who asked for his advice on the Colombian Church's criticism of "workers' priests". He was also received by US president Eisenhower and Mohammed V of Morocco in 1955 and 1956. In 1962, he resided for several months in Charles de Foucauld's retreat in Béni-Abbés (Algeria).

Abbé Pierre was then called to India in 1971 by Jayaprakash Narayan to represent, along with the Ligue des droits de l'homme (Human Rights League) France in the issues of refugees. Indira Gandhi then invited him to deal with the question of Bengali refugees, and Grouès founded Emmaus communities in Bangladesh.

== Emmaus ==
=== 1949: the origin ===
Emmaus (Emmaüs in French) was started in 1949. Its name is a reference to a village in Palestine appearing in the Gospel of Luke, where two disciples extended hospitality to Jesus just after his resurrection without recognizing him. In that way, Emmaus's mission is to help poor and homeless people. It is a secular organization. In 1950 the first community of Emmaus companions was created in Neuilly-Plaisance close to Paris in France. The Emmaus community raises funds for the construction of housing by selling used goods. "Emmaus, it's a little like the wheelbarrow, the shovels and the pickaxes coming before the banners. A sort of social fuel derived from salvaging defeating men".

=== Winter 1954: "Uprising of kindness" ===
Abbé Pierre in 1955

Grouès became famous during the extremely cold winter of 1954 in France, when homeless people were dying in the streets. Following the failure of the projected law on lodgings, he gave a well-remembered speech on Radio Luxembourg on 1 February 1954, and asked Le Figaro, a conservative newspaper, to publish his call, in which he stated soberly that "a woman froze to death tonight at 3:00 AM, on the pavement of Sebastopol Boulevard, clutching the eviction notice which the day before had made her homeless". He went on to describe the drama of homeless life, claiming that in "every town in France, in every quarter of Paris" ministry was needed based on "these simple words: 'If you suffer, whoever you are, enter, eat, sleep, recover hope, here you are loved'".

The next morning, the press wrote of an "uprising of kindness" (insurrection de la bonté) and the now-famous call for help ended up raising 500 million francs in donations (Charlie Chaplin gave 2 million). This enormous amount was totally unexpected; telephone operators and the postal service were overwhelmed, and owing to the volume of donations, several weeks were needed just to sort them, distribute them, and find a place to stock them throughout the country. Moreover, this call attracted volunteers from all over the country to help them, including wealthy bourgeoises who were emotionally shaken by the Abbé's call: first to do the redistribution, but then to duplicate the effort all around France. Quite quickly, Grouès had to organise his movement by creating the Emmaus communities on 23 March 1954.

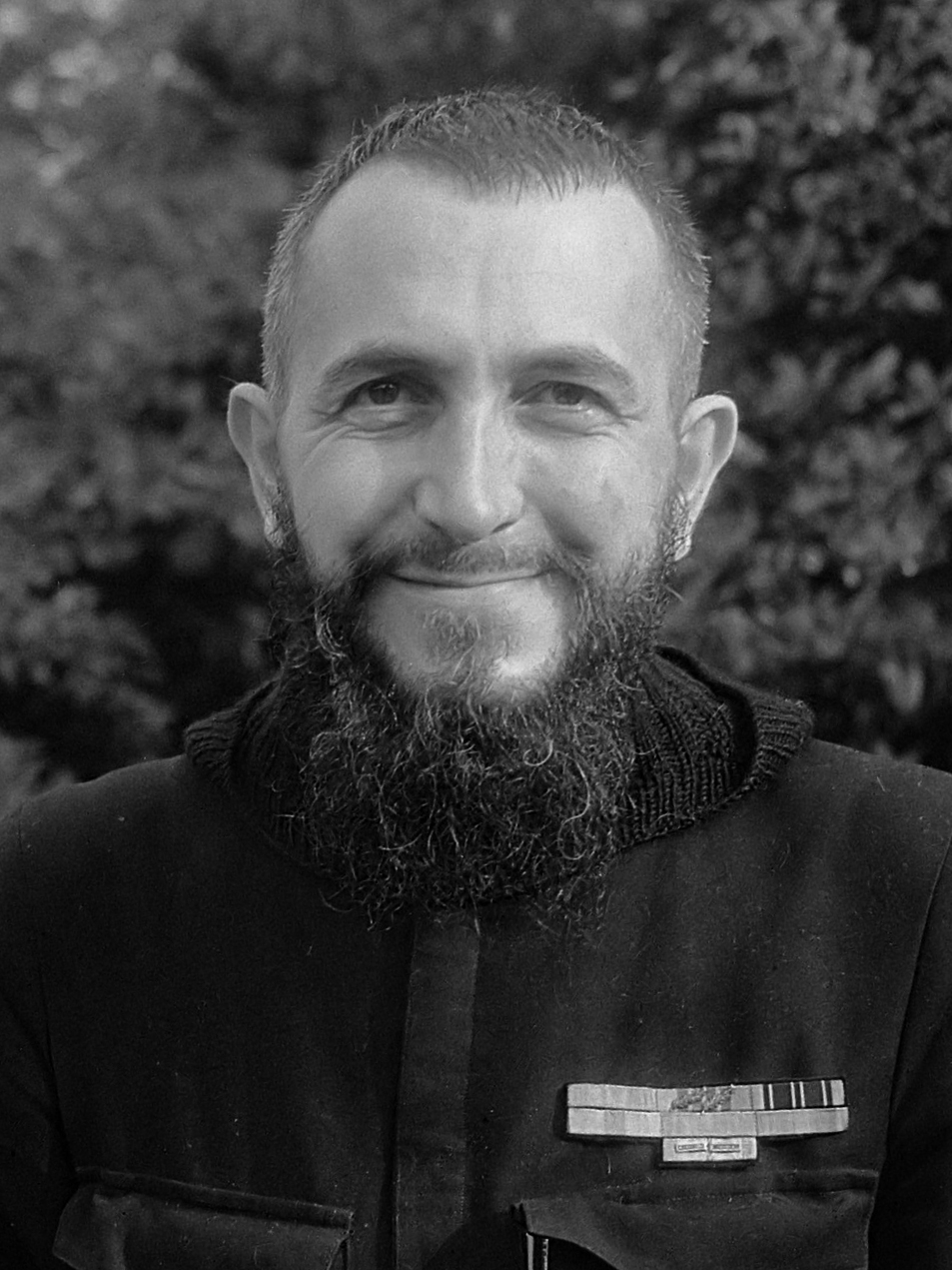
Abbé Pierre (1955)

A book was written by Boris Simon called Abbé Pierre and the ragpickers of Emmaus. It spread knowledge about the Emmaus community. In 1955, the priest gave President Eisenhower an English translation of the book in the oval office. The Emmaus communities quickly spread worldwide. Grouès traveled to Beyrouth (Beirut, Lebanon) in 1959, to assist in the creation of the first multiconfessional Emmaus group there; it was founded by a Sunni (Muslim), a Melkite (Catholic) archbishop and a Maronite (Christian) writer.

== 1980s to 2000s ==
After the 1981 election of President François Mitterrand (Socialist Party, PS), during which Abbé Pierre called for voters to vote in blank), he supported the initiative of the French Premier Laurent Fabius (PS) to create in 1984 the Revenu minimum d'insertion (RMI), a welfare system for indigent people. The same year, he organized the operation "Charity Christmas", which, relayed by France Soir, raised 6 million francs and 200 tons of products. The actor Coluche, who had organized the charitable Restos du Cœur, offered him 150 million French cents received by his organisation. Coluche's huge success with the Restos du Cœur, caused by his popularity (Coluche had even tried to nominate himself as a candidate in the 1981 presidential election before withdrawing), convinced the Abbé again of the necessity and value of such charitable struggles and the usefulness of the media in such endeavours.

In 1983, he spoke with Italian President Sandro Pertini to plead the cause of Vanni Mulinaris, imprisoned on charge of assistance to the Red Brigades (BR), and even observed eight days of hunger strike from 26 May to 3 June 1984 in the Cathedral of Turin to protest against detention conditions of "Brigadists" in Italian prisons and the imprisonment without trial of Vanni Mulinaris, who was recognized innocent sometimes afterwards. Italian magistrate Carlo Mastelloni recalled in the Corriere della Sera in 2007 that a niece of the Abbé was a secretary at Hyperion language school in Paris, directed by Vanni Mulinaris, and married to one of the Italians refugees then wanted by the Italian justice. According to the Corriere della Sera, it would even have been him who convinced then president François Mitterrand to grant protection from extradition to left-wing Italian activists who took refuge in France and had broken with their past.

More than 20 years later, the ANSA, Italian press agency, recalled that he had supported in 2005 one of his physicians, Michele d'Auria, who was a former member of Prima Linea, an Italian far-left group, and was accused of having participated in hold-ups during 1990. Like many other Italian activists, he had exiled himself to France during the "years of lead", and then joined the Emmaus companions. La Repubblica specified that Italian justice has recognized the innocence of all people close to the Hyperion School.

Following Grouès' death in January 2007, Italian magistrate Carlo Mastelloni declared to the Corriere della Sera that during the abduction of Aldo Moro Abbé Pierre had gone to the Christian Democrats' headquarters in Rome in an attempt to speak with its secretary Benigno Zaccagnini, in favor of a "hard line" of refusal of negotiations along with the BR.

In 1988, Abbé Pierre met representatives of the International Monetary Fund (IMF) to discuss the difficult financial, monetary and human issues brought by the huge Third World debt (starting in 1982, Mexico had announced it could not pay the service of its debt, triggering the 1980s Latin American debt crisis). In the 1990s, the Abbé criticized the apartheid regime in South Africa. In 1995, after a three-year-long siege of Sarajevo, he went there to exhort nations of the world to put an end to the violence, and requested French military operation against the Serb positions in Bosnia.

During the Gulf War (1990–91), Abbé Pierre directly addressed himself to US President George H. W. Bush and Iraq President Saddam Hussein. He asked French president François Mitterrand to engage himself in matters concerning refugees, in particular by the creation of a stronger organisation than the current UN High Commissioner for Refugees (HCR). He encountered this year the Dalai Lama during inter-religious peace encounters. A staunch supporter of the Palestinian cause, he has attracted attention with some of his statements on the Israeli-Palestine conflict.

His support "à titre amical" ("in title of friendship") for Roger Garaudy in 1996 brought controversy. The "Garaudy Affair" had been revealed in January 1996 by the Canard enchaîné satirical newspaper, which prompted a series of denunciations against his book, "The Foundational Myths of Israeli Politics", and led Garaudy to be charged of negationism (before being convicted in 1998, under the 1990 Gayssot Act). But Garaudy provoked public indignation when he announced in March that he was supported by the Abbé Pierre, who was immediately excluded from the honour committee of the LICRA (International League against Racism and Anti-Semitism). The Abbé condemned those who tried to "negate, banalize or falsify the Shoah", but his continued support to Garaudy as a friend was criticized by all anti-racist, Jewish organisations (MRAP, CRIF, Anti-Defamation League, etc.) and the Church hierarchy. His friend Bernard Kouchner, co-founder of Médecins Sans Frontières (MSF), criticized him for "absolving the intolerable", while Cardinal Jean-Marie Lustiger (and archbishop of Paris from 1981 to 2005) publicly disavowed him. The Abbé then went into retreat in the Benedictine monastery of Praglia near Padua, Italy. In the film documentary Un abbé nommé Pierre, une vie au service des autres, the Abbé declared that his support had been towards the person of Roger Garaudy, and not towards statements in his book, which he had not read.

The curator of the Deportation and Resistance Museum of the Isère department where Grouès carried out most of his resistance activities declared that Abbé Pierre would have merited ten times to be named Righteous Among the Nations for his struggle in favor of Jews during Vichy.

Following this 1996 controversial support to a personal acquaintance, the Abbé was shunned for a period by the media, although Grouès remained a popular figure.

== Positions on the Church hierarchy and the Vatican's policies ==
The Abbé's positions towards the Church and the Vatican also brought controversy. His positions on social issues and engagements were at times explicitly socialist and opposed to the Church. He maintained a relationship with the progressive French Catholic Bishop Jacques Gaillot, to which he recalled his duty of "instinct of a measured insolence". He did not like Mother Teresa; despite her work for the poor, her strict adherence to Catholic teaching on morality did not sit well with Abbé Pierre's left wing ideology. He had difficult relations with the Vatican. L'Osservatore Romano, known for reporting the deaths of priests, did not report on his death right away in 2007. Even though it is not customary for the Pope to offer condolences on the death of individual priests, Abbé Pierre's supporters were heavily critical of Pope Benedict XVI for not making an exception. Father Lombardi, spokesman of the Vatican, pointed journalists to the statement made by the French Church, while Benedict XVI did mention his death in private audiences. Official reactions from the Church came in two interviews of French cardinals, Roger Etchegaray and Paul Poupard. His criticisms of what he considered the lavish lifestyle of the Vatican got him a lot of publicity (especially when he reproached John Paul II for his expensive travels), but were not well received by the public. Cardinal Secretary of State Tarcisio Bertone lauded his "action in favor of poor": "Informed of the death of Abbe Pierre, the Holy Father gives thanks for his activity in favor of the poorest, by which he bore witness to the charity that comes from Christ. Entrusting to divine mercy this priest whose whole life was dedicated to fighting poverty, he asks the Lord to welcome him into the peace of His kingdom. By way of comfort and hope, His Holiness sends you a heartfelt apostolic blessing, which he extends to the family of the departed, to members of the communities of Emmaus, and to everyone gathering for the funeral".

His support for the ordination of women and for married clergy put him at odds with Catholic tradition, Church leaders and a substantial portion of French Catholics that followed the traditional teaching of the Church. The same stances, according to British state media, made him popular among the declining number of left-wing Catholics in France. In his book Mon Dieu... pourquoi? (God... Why?, 2005), co-written with Frédéric Lenoir, he admitted to breaking his solemn promise of celibacy by having had casual sex with women. Despite very strong grassroots opposition to adoption by same-sex couples, Abbé Pierre dismissed people's concerns that it deprives children of a mother or father and turns them into objects. The Abbé also opposed the traditional Catholic policy on contraceptives.

== Global policy ==
He was one of the signatories of the agreement to convene a convention for drafting a world constitution. As a result, for the first time in human history, a World Constituent Assembly convened to draft and adopt a Constitution for the Federation of Earth.

== Public image ==
=== International recognition ===
Abbé Pierre had the distinction of having been voted France's most popular person for many years, though he was surpassed in 2003 by Zinedine Zidane, moving to second place. In 2005, Abbé Pierre came third in a television poll to choose Le Plus Grand Français (The Greatest Frenchman).

In 1992, Pierre was awarded the Grand Officer of the National Order of the Legion of Honour. He refused the award, explaining in a letter addressed to Pierre Bérégovoy that he would refuse as long as "the automatic allocation of vacant premises had not put an end to the suffering of the homeless [...] Honour demands that those who suffer most should be served first. As long as this honour is ignored, how could anyone accept any distinction in our national order?"

In 1998, he has been made Grand Officer of the National Order of Quebec while in 2004, he was awarded the Grand Cross of the Legion of Honor by Jacques Chirac. He also received the Balzan Prize for Humanity, Peace and Brotherhood among Peoples in 1991 "For having fought, throughout his life, for the defence of human rights, democracy and peace. For having entirely dedicated himself to helping to relieve spiritual and physical suffering. For having inspired – regardless of nationality, race or religion – universal solidarity with the Emmaus Communities".

=== Accidents and health problems ===
He was often sick, particularly in the lungs when he was young. He was left unscathed in several dangerous situations:

- In 1950, while on a flight in India, his plane had to make an emergency landing due to engine failure.
- In 1963, his ship was shipwrecked in the Río de la Plata, between Argentina and Uruguay. He survived by clinging to a wooden part of the ship, while around him 80 passengers died. On a later trip to Algiers he showed the pocket knife which had enabled him to survive this ordeal.

== Death ==
Abbé Pierre remained active until his death on 22 January 2007 in the Val-de-Grâce military hospital in Paris, following a lung infection, aged 94. He took a stance on most social struggles: supporting illegal aliens, assisting the homeless on the "Enfants de Don Quichotte" movement (end of 2006–start of 2007) and social movements in favor of requisitioning empty buildings and offices (squats), etc. He continued to read La Croix, the Catholic social newspaper every day. In January 2007, he went to the National Assembly to lobby for a law on lodging homeless people. Following his death, the Minister of Social Cohesion Jean-Louis Borloo (UMP) decided to give Abbé Pierre's name to the law, despite the latter's scepticism of the law's real value. In 2005 he opposed conservative deputies who wanted to reform the Gayssot Act on housing projects (loi SRU), which would have imposed a 20% housing project limit in each town.

After homage by dignitaries, several hundred ordinary Parisians (among them professor Albert Jacquard, who worked with the abbé for the cause of homelessness) went to the Val-de-Grâce chapel to pay their respects. His funeral on 26 January 2007 at the Cathedral of Notre Dame de Paris was attended by numerous dignitaries: President Jacques Chirac, former President Valéry Giscard d'Estaing, Prime Minister Dominique de Villepin, many French Ministers, and the Companions of Emmaus, who were seated in the cathedral's first rows according to Abbé Pierre's last wishes. He was buried in a cemetery in Esteville, a small village in Seine-Maritime where he once lived.

== Sexual abuse allegations ==
In July 2024, the Fondation Abbé Pierre and Emmaus issued a statement about the results of an investigation they had commissioned after reports of abuse by Pierre had come to light. An independent research group reported that seven women (one of them a minor at the time of abuse) gave testimony about abuse they suffered at the hands of the French priest between the late 1970s and 2005.

In September 2024, a report commissioned by the Fondation reported that Abbé Pierre sexually harassed or assaulted at least two dozen women. An 8–9 year child was also allegedly abused. The abuse happened in France and in the United States. The second report led the Abbé Pierre Foundation being retitled, and Emmaus France voting on removing the priest's name from its logo. The Abbé Pierre Centre in Esteville in Normandy, where he lived for many years and is buried, was to close, and the disposal of hundreds of statuettes, busts and other images of the charity's creator was discussed. There was evidence that colleagues in Emmaus and the Catholic Church knew about Abbé Pierre's sexual behaviour, but did not speak out.

On 14 January 2025, the Bishops' Conference of France took legal action after the nine new accusations of sexual violence, in order to request the opening of an investigation.

== Honours ==
- France:
  - Grand Cross of the Order of the Legion of Honor (2004)
  - Grand Officer of the Order of the Legion of Honor (1992) (Note: He was nominated in 1992 but accepted it only in 2001, the delay being a protest of the French government's refusal to give vacant lodgings to homeless people.)
  - Commander of the Order of the Legion of Honor (1987)
  - Officer of the Order of the Legion of Honor (1981)
  - Recipient of the Médaille militaire
  - Recipient of the Croix de guerre 1939–1945 with bronze palms
  - Recipient of the Médaille de la Résistance
- Quebec:
  - ~~Grand Officer of the National Order of Quebec~~ (1995, stripped in 2025)

== Awards ==
- Balzan Prize

== Bibliography ==
He wrote many books and articles, including a book for children aged over ten, titled C'est quoi la mort?. Many of his publications have been translated into English. All profits from authors' rights (books, discs and videos) go to the Fondation Abbé Pierre which supports homeless and hungry people.

- 1987: Bernard Chevallier interroge l'abbé Pierre: Emmaüs ou venger l'homme, with Bernard Chevalier, éd. LGF/Livre de Poche, Paris. — ISBN 2-253-04151-3.
- 1988: Cent poèmes contre la misère, éd. Le Cherche-midi, Paris — ISBN 2-86274-141-8.
- 1993: Dieu et les hommes, with Bernard Kouchner, éd. Robert Laffont — ISBN 2-221-07618-4.
- 1994: Testament... — ISBN 2-7242-8103-9. Réédition 2005, éd. Bayard/Centurion, Paris — ISBN 2-227-47532-3.
- 1994: Une terre et des hommes, éd. Cerf, Paris.
- 1994: Absolu, éd. Seuil, Paris.
- 1996: Dieu merci, éd. Fayard/Centurion, Paris.
- 1996: Le bal des exclus, éd. Fayard, Paris.
- 1997: Mémoires d'un croyant, éd. Fayard, Paris.
- 1999: Fraternité, éd. Fayard, Paris.
- 1999: Paroles, éd. Actes Sud, Paris.
- 1999: C'est quoi la mort?
- 1999: J'attendrai le plaisir du Bon Dieu: l'intégrale des entretiens d'Edmond Blattchen, éd. Alice, Paris.
- 2000: En route vers l'absolu, éd. Flammarion, Paris.
- 2001: La Planète des pauvres. Le tour du monde à vélo des communautés Emmaüs, de Louis Harenger, Michel Friedman, Emmaus international, Abbé Pierre, éd. J'ai lu, Paris — ISBN 2-290-30999-0.
- 2002: Confessions, éd. Albin Michel, Paris — ISBN 2-226-13051-9.
- 2002: Je voulais être marin, missionnaire ou brigand, rédigé avec Denis Lefèvre, éd. Le Cherche-midi, Paris — ISBN 2-7491-0015-1. Réédition en livre de poche, éd. J'ai lu, Paris — ISBN 2-290-34221-1.
- 2004: L'Abbé Pierre, la construction d'une légende, by Philippe Falcone, éd. Golias — ISBN 2-914475-49-7.
- 2004: L'Abbé Pierre parle aux jeunes, with Pierre-Roland Saint-Dizier, éd. Du Signe, Paris — ISBN 2-7468-1257-6.
- 2005: Le sourire d'un ange, éd. Elytis, Paris.
- 2005: Mon Dieu... pourquoi? Petites méditations sur la foi chrétienne et le sens de la vie, with Frédéric Lenoir, éd. Plon — ISBN 2-259-20140-7.
- 2006: Servir: Paroles de vie, with Albine Navarino, éd. Presses du Châtelet, Paris — ISBN 2-84592-186-1.

== Discography ==
- 2001: Radioscopie: Abbé Pierre - Entretien avec Jacques Chancel, CD Audio - OCLC 416996272.
- 1988–2003: Éclats De Voix, suite de CD Audio, Poèmes et réflexions, en 4 volumes:
  - Vol. 1: Le Temps des Catacombes, rééd. label Celia - OCLC 416996232.
  - Vol. 2: Hors de Soi, rééd. label Celia - OCLC 416996251.
  - Vol. 3: Corsaire de Dieu, rééd. label Celia - OCLC 416996232.
  - Vol. 4: ?, label Scalen - OCLC 401716081.
- 2005: Le CD Testament..., pour fêter le 56^{e} anniversaire de la Foundation d'Emmaüs (réflexions personnelles, textes et paroles inspirées de la Bible) - ISBN 2-227-47532-3.
- 2005: Avant de partir..., le testament audio de l'Abbé Pierre, CD audio et vidéos pour PC, prières et musiques de méditation - OCLC 319795796.
- 2006: L'Insurgé de l'amour, label Revues Bayard, Paris - OCLC 936964597.
- 2006: Paroles de Paix de l'Abbé Pierre, CD audio, label Fremeux - OCLC 419366250.

== Filmography ==
- 1955: Les Chiffonniers d'Emmaüs from Robert Darène with Pierre Mondy.
- 1989: Hiver 54, l'abbé Pierre from Denis Amar, with Lambert Wilson and Claudia Cardinale.
- 2023: Abbé Pierre – A Century of Devotion from Frédéric Tellier with Benjamin Lavernhe and Emmanuelle Bercot.

== See also ==
- Emmaus Mouvement
- Streetwise priest
- List of peace activists
