= Rougui Dia =

French chef (born 1976)

- Born: 1976 (age 49–50); France
- Education: École Hôtelière Villepinte
- Occupations: Chef, bakery owner, author

Rougui Dia (born 1976) is a French chef, who is internationally renowned. She is the first Black woman to be the executive chef at a Michelin-star restaurant. She is known as the “New Black Pearl of Paris,” comparing her to Josephine Baker, and the “African Queen of Parisian Cuisine".

== Biography ==
Dia was born in France to Muslim Senegalese immigrants. She and six siblings grew up in Neuilly-Plaisance. She began cooking African-inspired dishes for her family at around thirteen years old.

Dia enrolled in vocational and catering classes at the École Hôtelière Villepinte. She graduated with her certificat d'aptitude professionnelle in 1996. She continued studying there until 1999, when she received her practitioner's certification. She was unemployed for about two years due to racism in the industry, finally getting a job at Chez Jean, where she met Sébastien Faré.

A mentor recommended that Dia at the restaurant Le Louvre Chef under Faré, where she rose from clerk to sous-chef. In 2000, she began working at Le Petrossian 144 under Chef Phillipe Conticini, where she began as vegetable cook and again rose to sous-chef. In 2005, she was promoted to head-chef, to "media frenzy." In this position, she was the first Black woman to lead a Michelin-starred restaurant. While there, she incorporated Senegalese, Indian, and Caribbean cuisine into the menu.

In 2006, Dia published an autobiography, Le Chef est une Femme (The Chef is a Woman).

In 2013, Dia moved to Le Vraymonde at the Buddha-Bar Hotel Paris, a restaurant known for its Asian dishes, as their executive chef. Three years later, she opened a pastry shop, Un Amour de Baba, specializing in rum babas. In 2019, Rougui moved to Denver, where her sister lives, where they opened bakery and high-end bistro Le French, where she is the executive chef.

== Awards ==
- 2024: Semi-finalist for Best Chef: Mountain (with Aminata Dia), James Beard Foundation Award
- 2014: Trofemina Trophy
- French National Medal of Honor
