= Robert Hirsch (actor) =

French actor (1925–2017)

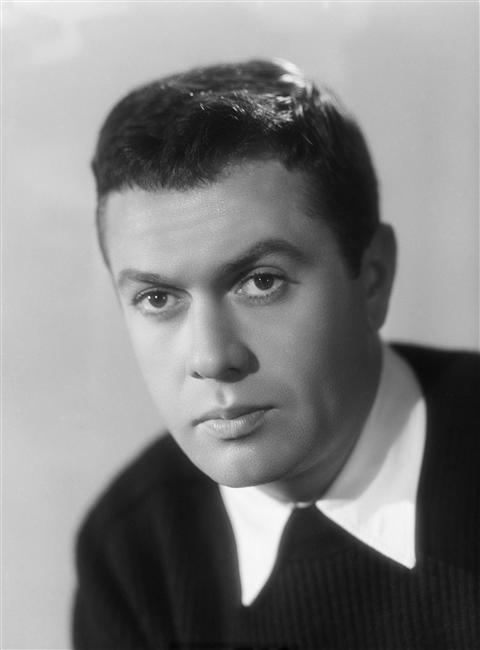
- Born: 26 July 1925; L'Isle-Adam, Val-d'Oise, France
- Died: 16 November 2017 (aged 92); Paris, France
- Occupation: Actor
- Years active: 1951–2017

Robert Hirsch (26 July 1925 – 16 November 2017) was a French actor. He was a sociétaire of the Comédie-Française since 1952. In 1990, he won César Award for Best Actor in a Supporting Role for his role in Hiver 54, l'abbé Pierre.

His other film appearances included The Hunchback of Notre Dame, and in 2006/07 he appeared in Le gardien (a French adaptation of Harold Pinter's The Caretaker) at Théâtre de l'Oeuvre then Théâtre de Paris.

In April 2011, he asked Florian Zeller to write a part specially for him. The result was Le Père which had its first performance in Le Théâtre Hébertot, Paris, in September 2012. Hirsch played the central character, André, at the age of 87.

== Partial filmography ==
- The Turkey (1951) - Rédillon
- Royal Affairs in Versailles (1954) - Le duc de Charmeroy (uncredited)
- Les Intrigantes (1954) - Pakévitch
- Yours Truly, Blake (1954) - Saganoff
- Plucking the Daisy (1956) - Roger Vital
- The Hunchback of Notre Dame (1956) - Pierre Gringoire
- The Amorous Corporal (1958) - Boisrose
- Mimi Pinson (1958) - Jean-Lou
- Maigret and the Saint-Fiacre Case (1959) - Lucien Sabatier
- 125 Rue Montmartre (1959) - Didier Barrachet
- Adieu Philippine (1962) - Juan Salcedo dans l'émission de télévision 'Montserrat' (uncredited)
- Impossible on Saturday (1965) - Carlo, plus 11 other roles
- Monnaie de singe (1966) - Fulbert Taupin
- Kiss Me General (1966) - Martin
- All Mad About Him (1967) - Mathieu Gossin
- Les cracks (1968) - Me Mulot
- Appelez-moi Mathilde (1969) - Hubert de Pifre, l'officier
- Shock Treatment (1973) - Gérôme Savignat
- Chobizenesse (1975) - Jean-Sébastien Bloch
- La crime (1983) - Avram Kazavian
- Hiver 54, l'abbé Pierre (1989) - Raoul
- My Man (1996) - M. Hervé
- Mortel Transfert (2001) - Armand Zlibovic
- A Private Affair (2002) - Vieil homme
- The Art Dealer (2015) - Claude Weinstein (final film role)

== Awards and nominations ==
=== Molière Awards ===
Year	Group	Award	Play	Result
1992	Molière Awards	Best Supporting Actor	Le Misanthrope	Won
1997	Molière Awards	Best Supporting Actor	En attendant Godot	Won
1999	Molière Awards	Best Actor	Le Bel air de Londres	Won
2007	Molière Awards	Best Actor	The Caretaker	Won

Year	Group	Award	Play	Result
1990	Molière Awards	Best Actor	Moi Feuerbach	Nominated
1993	Molière Awards	Best Actor	Une folie	Nominated
2003	Molière Awards	Best Actor	Sarah	Nominated

=== César Awards ===
Year	Group	Award	Film	Result
1990	César Awards	Best Supporting Actor	Hiver 54, l'abbé Pierre	Won

== Sources ==
- Europa Publications (2003). The International Who's Who 2004. Routledge. ISBN 978-1-85743-217-6.
- L'Avant-scene theatre No. 1331 Octobre 2012
