= Hiver 54, l'abbé Pierre =

1989 film by Denis Amar

- Theatrical release poster
- Directed by: Denis Amar
- Written by: Marie Devort; Denis Amar
- Produced by: Christian Ardan
- Starring: Lambert Wilson; Claudia Cardinale; Robert Hirsch; Bernie Bonvoisin
- Cinematography: Gerard de Battista
- Edited by: Jacques Witta
- Music by: Philippe Sarde
- Production companies: Belles Rives Productions; Midships Associes
- Distributed by: AMLF; Metropolitan Filmexport; Circle Releasing Corporation
- Release date: 1 November 1989
- Running time: 102 Minutes
- Country: France
- Language: French
- Budget: $7.3 million
- Box office: $12.3 million

Hiver 54, l'abbé Pierre is a 1989 French film, directed by Denis Amar, and starring Lambert Wilson and Claudia Cardinale. Supporting actor Robert Hirsch won a Best Supporting Actor award from the French Academy of Cinema for the film.

== Plot ==
Based on a true story, the film recounts the efforts by a parish priest, Father Pierre, to gain assistance from the government for the homeless, who after World War II were living in poverty and suffering from one of the coldest winters on record. His plea, which was published in newspapers, roused public support and resulted in the establishment of a charity, "Les Chiffoniers d'Emmaus" (The Ragpickers of Emmaus) to raise funds for them. The charity is still operational.

== Cast ==
- Lambert Wilson – Father Pierre
- Claudia Cardinale – Hélène Vannier
- Robert Hirsch – Raoul
- Bernie Bonvoisin – Castaing
- Isabelle Petit-Jacques – Mademoiselle Coutaz
- Stephane Butet – Jean
- Wladimir Yordanoff – Senator Charmat
- Philippe Leroy – Jacques
- Laurent Terzieff – Press Boss
- Bernard Lefort – Paris Prefect of Police

== Awards ==
Robert Hirsch won the César Award for Best Supporting Actor from the Académie des Arts et Techniques du Cinéma in 1990.

== See also ==
- Abbé Pierre – A Century of Devotion
