= Hôtel de Ville, Neuilly-Plaisance =

Town hall in Neuilly-Plaisance, France

Hôtel de Ville
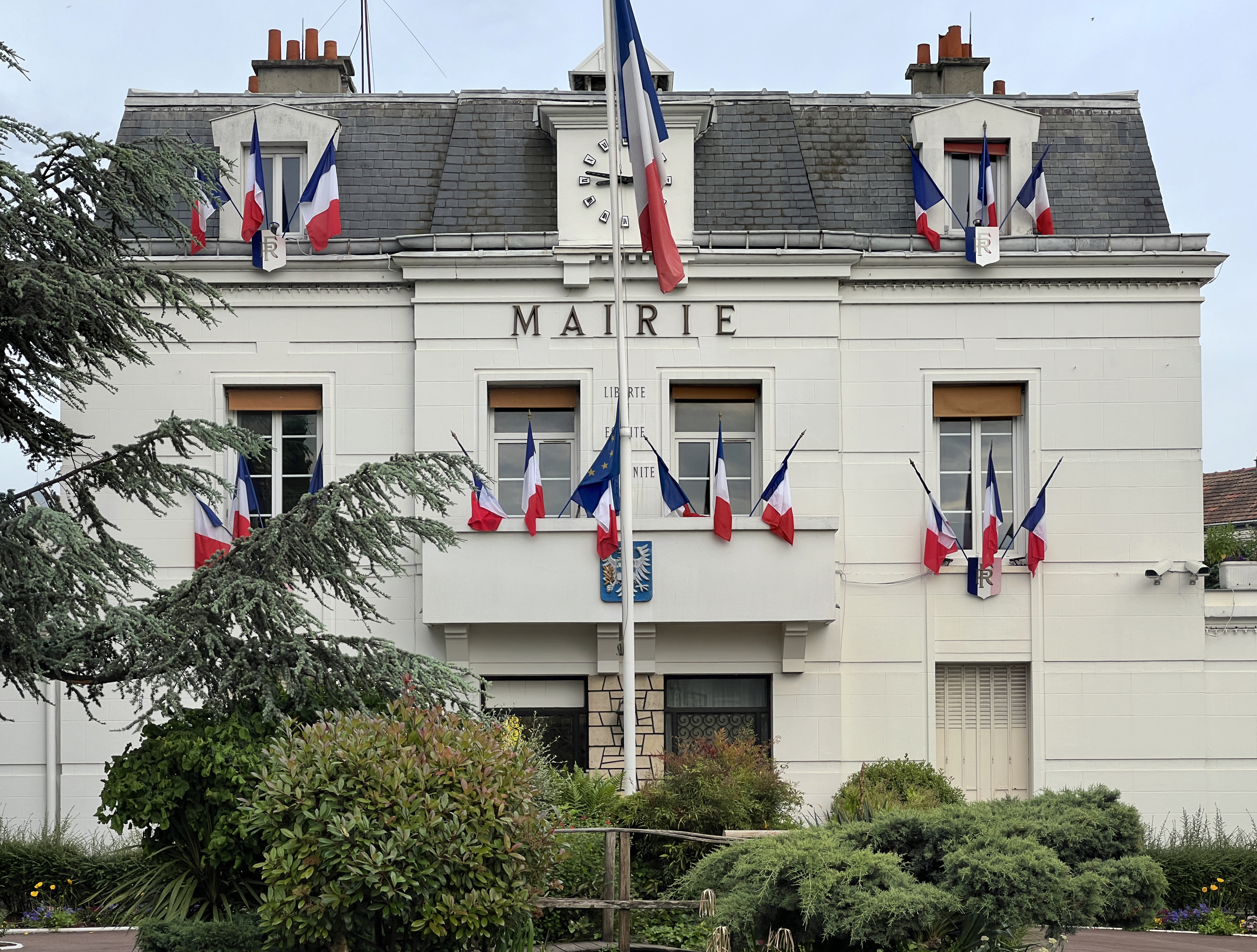
- The main frontage of the Hôtel de Ville in May 2024
- Interactive map of the Hôtel de Ville area

General information
- Type: City hall
- Architectural style: Neoclassical style
- Location: Neuilly-Plaisance, France
- Coordinates: 48.8608°N 2.5063°E
- Completed: c.1865

The Hôtel de Ville (French pronunciation: [otɛl də vil], City Hall) is a municipal building in Neuilly-Plaisance, Seine-Saint-Denis, in the eastern suburbs of Paris, standing on Rue du Général de Gaulle.

== History ==
After the commune of Neuilly-Plaisance was separated from the commune of Neuilly-sur-Marne on 13 April 1892, the new town council led by the mayor, Louis Bordet, decided to acquire a suitable building to use as a town hall. The council received a payment of FFr15,000 from the commune of Neuilly-sur-Marne as compensation for loss of use of that commune's town hall. The building they selected was a private residence on the east side of Rue de Plaisance (now Rue du Général de Gaulle). It had been commissioned by a carriage builder, Sieur Langnier, and his wife in 1864. The building had been designed in the neoclassical style, built in ashlar stone and had been completed in around 1865.

The design involved a symmetrical main frontage of four bays facing onto Rue de Plaisance. The central section of two bays, which was slightly projected forward, featured two square-headed doorways on the ground floor, two square-headed French doors with a balcony, which was originally balustraded, on the first floor, and a clock, which was originally pedimented, at roof level. The outer bays were fenestrated by square-headed casement windows on both floors and there were dormer windows at attic level.

After Sieur Langnier got into financial difficulties, the building was repurchased by Sieur Poulet-Langlet, who had been the original developer of the area, in 1867. The building was later acquired by Antoine Tronchaud who, as well as being head of a school in Paris, was also involved in promoting the annual festival in Neuilly-Plaisance. After Tronchaud's death, the house was put up for sale and the newly-established council acquired it. A small lantern was added on the roof and one of the reception rooms was converted to create the Salle du Conseil (council chamber).

Extensions were added to the south to create a library in 1899, and to the rear to create a Salle des Mariages (wedding room) in 1905. A war memorial, in the form of a bronze soldier on a pedestal, designed by Louis Armand Bardery and intended to commemorate the lives of local service personnel who died in the First World War, was unveiled behind the building some 300 metres (980 ft) to the northeast along what is now Rue du Général Leclerc in 1921.
