= David Kirk (activist) =

American priest (1935–2007)

Davey "David" Kirk (March 12, 1935 – May 23, 2007) was an American priest, as well as a civil rights and anti-poverty activist who founded New York City's Emmaus House. He was reared a Baptist, but converted to the Melkite Catholic Church and later the Orthodox Church in America a few years before his death.

== Biography ==
=== Early life and education ===
David (his given name was Davey, which he despised) Kirk was born in Louisville, Mississippi, and was a Baptist by upbringing. Aged 12, he befriended a black man named Clint who worked for his father, family members said. After Clint was accused of murdering his wife, David, believing in his friend’s innocence, brought food every day to the woods where Clint was hiding. Clint eventually escaped over the state line to Louisiana.

Later, as the editor of his high school paper in Mobile, Alabama, David Kirk won permission to attend a local black high school for a month. He told the authorities he was researching an article about the education of black youth. What he really wanted to do, his family said, was to try to experience how the other half lived in the Jim Crow South. (He had asked to transfer to the school full-time, coming up with the cover story only after his request was denied.)

“I came out of that school shocked and radicalized”, he later wrote in an unpublished narrative of his life.

Entering the University of Alabama in 1953, Kirk was drawn to the work of a Catholic campus chaplain who opposed segregation. That year, Kirk converted to Catholicism. He earned a bachelor's degree in social science in 1957, and a few years later moved to New York to work with Dorothy Day at the Catholic Worker House on the Bowery. He earned a master's degree in social thought from Columbia University in 1964 and was ordained as a Melkite priest that year.

=== Priesthood ===
After ordination, Kirk went back to Alabama amid the civil rights movement. (He was jailed with Martin Luther King Jr. on at least one occasion.) Later returning to New York, he planned to start a communal house for the homeless on the Lower East Side. Day, who died in 1980, told him to go instead to Harlem, where the need was greater, and Emmaus House was born.

In 1969 David Kirk produced the book Quotations from Chairman Jesus (via Templegate Publishers), which became a bestseller after its release. The book aims to show, by compiling a wide variety of Biblical and early Christian quotations, that Jesus' life and teachings, as well as early Christianity, were actually based upon a community-centered mindset. In the text, Kirk wrote:

"Our present Christian community is not the church it ought to be... If this book has anything to say it is that the oppressed ought to come first in the Church which dares to follow Jesus Christ. If it suggests nothing more to you, let it say that money and property are meant to be common to everybody, and that he who shares power, property, and money with the poor, only returns what rightfully belongs to the poor."

=== Emmaus House ===
He established Emmaus House in the mid-1960s, on East 116th Street in Manhattan, New York. It was conceived not as a shelter but as a community for the city’s homeless men and women and was modeled on the Emmaus movement, begun in France after World War II to aid the poor.

Not long after it began, Emmaus House moved to 160 West 120th Street. In the mid-1980s, it moved again, into the former Charles Hotel on Lexington Avenue at 124th Street in Harlem. The building had long been known as a haven for drug dealers and prostitutes. Kirk's operation provided long-term housing to more than 70 people, and its community kitchen served 500 lunches a day. It also offered a variety of programs, from teaching job skills like woodworking to providing social services for drug addicts and persons with AIDS. Each resident was paid the same weekly stipend as Kirk himself ($25).

After 2001, Emmaus House moved back at its former location on West 120th Street, which can house up to 15 people.

=== Orthodoxy ===
In 2004, near the end of his life, Kirk converted to Eastern Orthodoxy, joining the Orthodox Church in America (an offshoot of the Russian Orthodox Church) while remaining a priest. He became a member of the Orthodox Peace Fellowship and began to collaborate with Albert J. Raboteau, an African American history professor in New York (and a fellow convert from Catholicism to Orthodoxy).

=== Death ===
After a period of declining health, kidney trouble and other ailments, Kirk died in his sleep, aged 72. At his request, he was buried near his longtime mentor, Dorothy Day, at Resurrection Cemetery in Staten Island.

After a brief period of uncertainty with regard to the future of Emmaus House immediately following Kirk’s decline and death, it began a period of renaissance.

== Bibliography ==
- Divine Disobedience: Profiles in Catholic Radicalism by Francine du Plessix Gray
