= Esteville =

- Commune
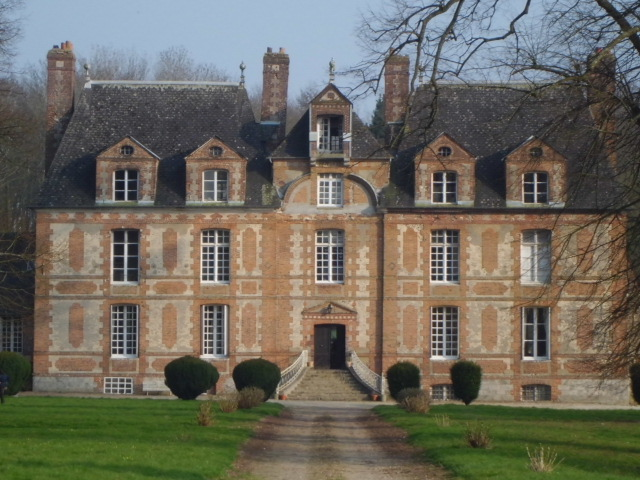
- The chateau in Esteville

- Coat of arms
- Location of Esteville
- Location within France Location within Normandy
- Coordinates: 49°36′24″N 1°13′21″E
- Country: France
- Region: Normandy
- Department: Seine-Maritime
- Arrondissement: Rouen
- Canton: Bois-Guillaume

Government
  - Mayor (2020–2026): Manuel Grente
- Area^{1}: 5.29 km^{2} (2.04 sq mi)
- Elevation: 172 m (564 ft)
- Highest elevation: 176 m (577 ft)
- Lowest elevation: 156 m (512 ft)
- Population (2023): 559
  - Density: 106/km^{2} (274/sq mi)
- Time zone: UTC+01:00 (CET)
  - Summer (DST): UTC+02:00 (CEST)
- INSEE/Postal code: 76247 /76690
- ^{1} French Land Register data, which excludes lakes, ponds, glaciers > 1 km^{2} (0.386 sq mi or 247 acres) and river estuaries.

Esteville is a commune in the Seine-Maritime department in the region of Normandy, France.

== Geography ==
A farming village situated in the Pays de Caux, some 15 miles (24 km) northeast of Rouen, at the junction of the D15 and the D57 roads.

== Heraldry ==
Arms of Esteville	The arms of Esteville are blazoned : Gules, a chevron between 2 plates and a fallow deer head argent, on a chief Or a castle gules between 2 trefoils vert.

== Population ==
Historical population
Year	Pop.	±% p.a.
1968	261	—
1975	320	+2.95%
1982	428	+4.24%
1990	378	−1.54%
1999	376	−0.06%
2007	529	+4.36%
2012	514	−0.57%
2017	495	−0.75%
2023	559	+2.05%
Source: INSEE

== Notable people ==
Abbé Pierre, priest and founder of the Emmaus movement, lived here for more than 20 years and was buried here, alongside 20 of his companions and his secretary, Lucie Coutaz who assisted him for much of his life. A centre of the Emmaus Movement, housing youngsters in difficulty, was built here where the priest's own private room may still be seen. Today his grave has become a place of meditation and the village of Esteville sometimes receives between 300 and 500 visitors per day.

== Places of interest ==
- The church of St.Sulpice, dating from the sixteenth century.
- The church of St.Clotilde, dating from the sixteenth century.
- The seventeenth-century chateau.

== See also ==
- Communes of the Seine-Maritime department
