= The Art Dealer =

2015 film by François Margolin

- Film poster
- Directed by: François Margolin
- Screenplay by: Jean-Claude Grumberg; François Margolin; Vincent Mariette; Sophie Seligmann
- Based on: an original idea by Sophie Seligmann
- Produced by: François Margolin
- Starring: Anna Sigalevitch; François Berléand; Michel Bouquet; Robert Hirsch; Louis-Do de Lencquesaing
- Cinematography: Caroline Champetier; Olivier Guerbois
- Edited by: Xavier Sirven
- Production companies: Margo Cinema; Commune Image Média
- Distributed by: Margo Cinema
- Release date: 18 March 2015
- Running time: 93 minutes
- Country: France
- Language: French

The Art Dealer (French title: L'Antiquaire) is a 2015 French thriller drama film produced and directed by François Margolin. The film is about a young woman's quest to recover the collection of paintings stolen from her Jewish family during the Second World War. It was released in France on 18 March 2015.

== Cast ==
- Anna Sigalevitch as Esther
- Michel Bouquet as Raoul
- Robert Hirsch as Claude Weinstein
- François Berléand as Simon
- Louis-Do de Lencquesaing as Melchior
- Adam Sigalevitch as Gaspard
- Alice de Lencquesaing as Jeanne
- Niels Schneider as Klaus
- Benjamin Siksou as Jean
- Fabienne Babe as Fabienne
- Christophe Bourseiller as Hurtado
- Olga Grumberg as The Editor
- Lolita Chammah as Sophie
