= Abbé Pierre – A Century of Devotion =

2023 biographical drama film

- French: L'Abbé Pierre – Une vie de combats
- Directed by: Frédéric Tellier
- Written by: Frédéric Tellier; Olivier Gorce
- Produced by: Wassim Béji; Thierry Desmichelle
- Starring: Benjamin Lavernhe
- Cinematography: Renaud Chassaing
- Edited by: Valérie Deseine
- Music by: Bryce Dessner
- Production companies: WY Productions; SND; France 3 Cinéma
- Distributed by: SND
- Release dates: 26 May 2023 (Cannes); 8 November 2023 (France)
- Running time: 138 minutes
- Country: France
- Language: French
- Budget: €15 million
- Box office: $6.1 million

Abbé Pierre – A Century of Devotion (French: L'Abbé Pierre – Une vie de combats) is a 2023 French biographical drama film based on the life of Abbé Pierre, a Catholic priest and national hero in France who devoted his life to helping the poor, homeless people and refugees. Directed by Frédéric Tellier from a screenplay written by Tellier and Olivier Gorce, the film stars Benjamin Lavernhe as Abbé Pierre.

The film premiered at the 76th Cannes Film Festival on 26 May 2023. It was theatrically released in France by SND on 8 November 2023.

== Synopsis ==
The life of Henri Grouès, known as Abbé Pierre, from his time in the Resistance in WWII to his fights against poverty and for the homeless.

== Cast ==
- Benjamin Lavernhe as Abbé Pierre
- Emmanuelle Bercot as Lucie Coutaz
- Michel Vuillermoz as Georges Legay

== Production ==
=== Development ===
In January 2020, it was announced that SND Films and Wy Productions were preparing a film about the life of Abbé Pierre. Frédéric Tellier was announced as director, and co-writer of the script with Olivier Gorce. The idea for the film was born from the desire of Wassim Béji and SND Films to tell the story of the priest's life. Béji explained, "Abbé Pierre had an incredible life and was a true rock star. To tell the story of this figure who traversed the 20th century is to tell our story". The film was produced by Béji's WY Productions and by SND, in co-production with France 3 Cinéma.

In developing the screenplay, Frédéric Tellier researched extensively for about 3 years. He read books written by Abbé Pierre or by his relatives and watched news footage as well as fictional portrayals of the subject, including Hiver 54, l'abbé Pierre (1989) and Les Chiffonniers d'Emmaüs (1955). He also spoke with individuals who knew the priest, such as Laurent Desmard, who worked in a high-ranking position at Emmaüs and who was his private secretary.

=== Filming ===
Filming began in December 2021, under the working title Les Onze Vies de l'Abbé Pierre (The Eleven Lives of Abbé Pierre). It took place in Paris (Studios Ferber), in the Île-de-France region (Villeneuve-la-Garenne, Boissy-sous-Saint-Yon) and in the Auvergne-Rhône-Alpes region, including Lyon, Chambéry (Savoie), Annecy (Haute-Savoie) and the Vercors (Isère). In July 2022, a sequence was shot in Agon-Coutainville (Manche).

Principal photography concluded in July 2022.

== Release ==
The film was selected to be screened out of competition at the 76th Cannes Film Festival, where it had its world premiere on 26 May 2023.

The film was theatrically released in France by SND on 8 November 2023.

== Reception ==
=== Critical response ===
Abbé Pierre – A Century of Devotion received an average rating of 3.1 out of 5 stars on the French website AlloCiné, based on 28 reviews.

Reviewing the film following its Cannes premiere, Allan Hunter of Screen International praised the film's "handsomely crafted storytelling".

=== Accolades ===
Award	Date of ceremony	Category	Recipient(s)	Result	Ref.
César Awards	23 February 2024	Best Actor	Benjamin Lavernhe	Nominated	

== See also ==
- Hiver 54, l'abbé Pierre
