= Lucie Coutaz =

Lucie Coutaz (9 May 1899 – 16 May 1982) was a French clerical worker who belonged to the French Resistance during the Second World War and afterwards assisted Abbé Pierre in setting up the charity Emmaus.

== Early life and career ==
She was born in Grenoble, and as a 16-year-old office worker suffered a paralysis caused by Pott disease, from which she recovered after a pilgrimage to Lourdes in 1921. Having completed secretarial training, she became a social worker and a union leader in the French Confederation of Christian Workers. The information office where she worked was used as a cover by the French Resistance. In 1943, she agreed to shelter Henry Grouès (alias Abbé Pierre) from the Gestapo, and this began a relationship that would last for almost forty years. The abbé took refuge in North Africa, but returned after the war to seek her out. He was now almoner of the "Maison du Marin" in Paris and asked her to accompany him there. Although reluctant to leave Grenoble, she agreed. His political activities took up so much of his time that she considered leaving.

== Post-war ==
She was awarded the Croix de Guerre with bronze star in 1945. After the war, she continued as secretary to the Abbé Pierre, and she became known as “Mother Coutaz” by the people in need who visited his offices. Some colleagues referred to her as "Lucie la Terreur". The abbé himself said that, without Lucie, Emmaus, which was founded in 1949, would never have existed. During France's exceptionally cold winter of 1954, the charity was almost overwhelmed by its task, and the abbé appealed publicly for assistance, while Lucie Coutaz looked after the day-to-day management. As a result, the first Emmaus communities were created.

At the age of 82, she again suffered a paralysis; among her last words were, "Maintenant, mission accomplie." Her book, 40 ans avec l'Abbé Pierre, was published in 1988. She is buried close to the abbé (who died in 2007) in the village of Esteville, his former home.
