= Frédéric Lenoir =

French sociologist, philosopher and writer (born 1962)

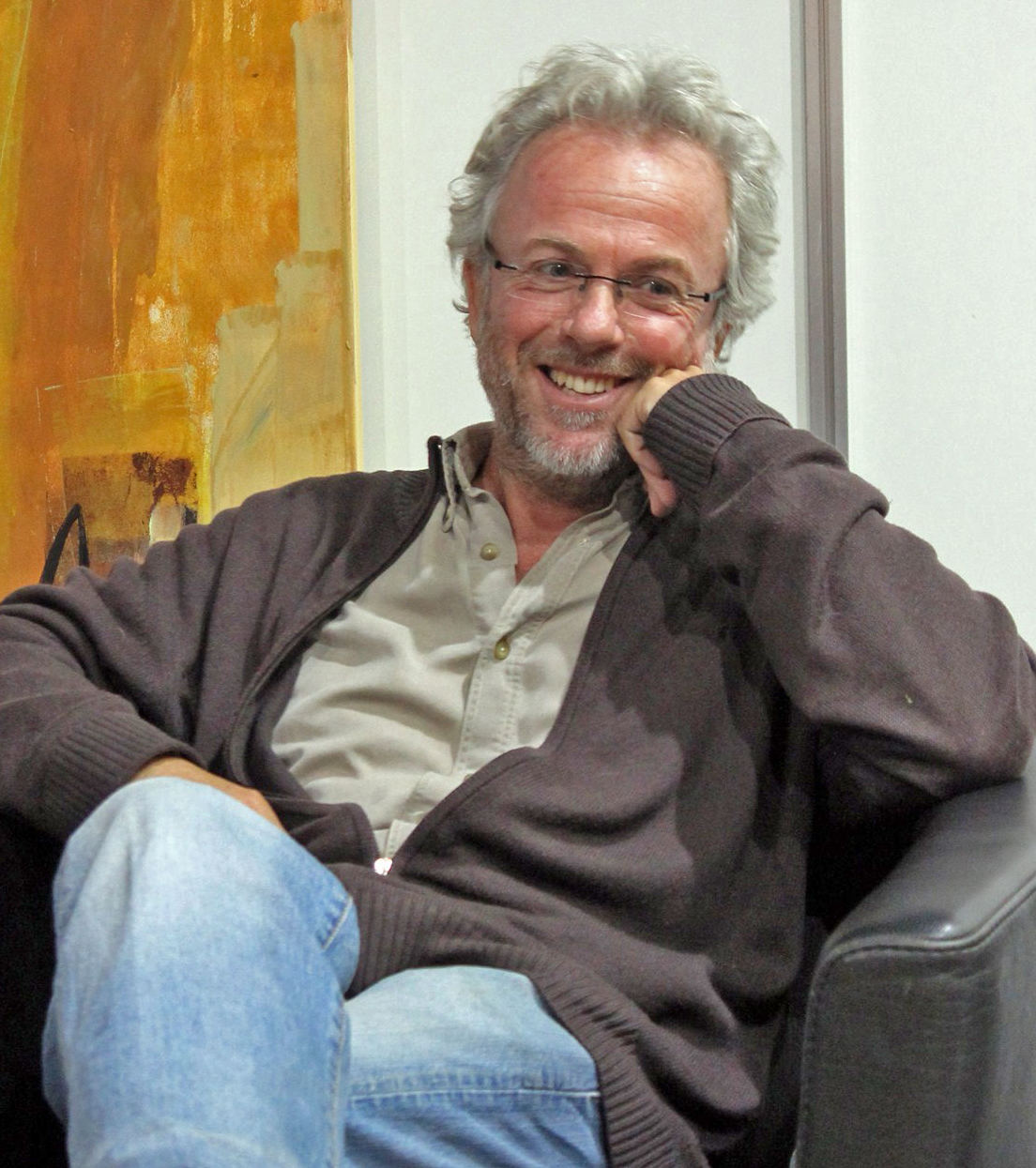
- Born: June 3, 1962 (age 63); Antananarivo, Madagascar

Frédéric Lenoir (born 3 June 1962) is a French sociologist, philosopher and writer.

== Biography ==
Lenoir studied philosophy at the University of Fribourg followed by a PhD on Buddhism and the West at the School for Advanced Studies in the Social Sciences. His first two novels – The Angel's Promise (2004, with Violette Cabesos) and The Oracle of the Moon (2006) – sold more than a million copies in twenty countries.

== Awards ==
- Prix Maison de la Presse (2004, with Violette Cabesos)
