= Neuilly-Plaisance =

- Commune
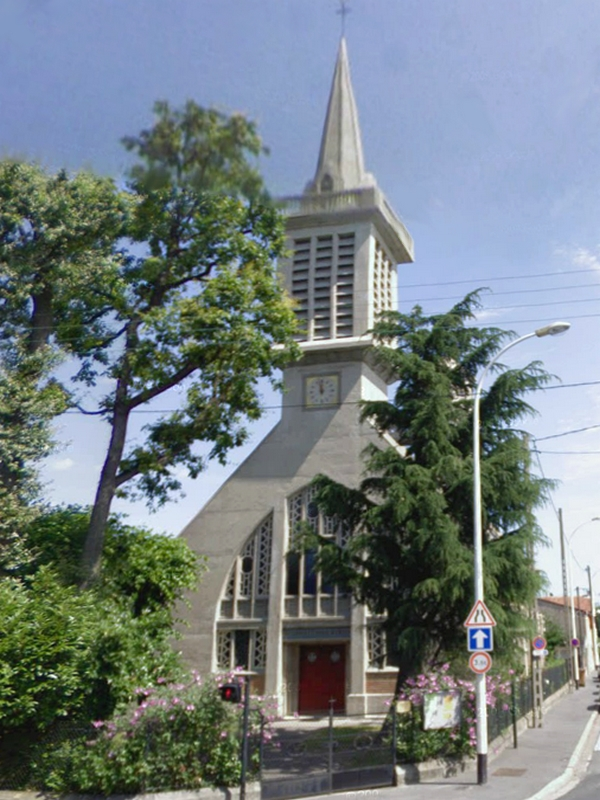
- The church of Our Lady of the Assumption, in Neuilly-Plaisance

- Coat of arms

- Location (in red) within Paris inner suburbs
- Location of Neuilly-Plaisance
- Location within France Location within Île-de-France (region)
- Coordinates: 48°51′43″N 2°30′23″E
- Country: France
- Region: Île-de-France
- Department: Seine-Saint-Denis
- Arrondissement: Le Raincy
- Canton: Villemomble
- Intercommunality: Grand Paris

Government
  - Mayor (2026–32): Christian Demuynck
- Area^{1}: 3.42 km^{2} (1.32 sq mi)
- Elevation: 48 m (157 ft)
- Highest elevation: 117 m (384 ft)
- Lowest elevation: 37 m (121 ft)
- Population (2023): 21,941
  - Density: 6,420/km^{2} (16,600/sq mi)
- Time zone: UTC+01:00 (CET)
  - Summer (DST): UTC+02:00 (CEST)
- INSEE/Postal code: 93049 /93360
- ^{1} French Land Register data, which excludes lakes, ponds, glaciers > 1 km^{2} (0.386 sq mi or 247 acres) and river estuaries.

Neuilly-Plaisance (French pronunciation: [nœji plɛzɑ̃s]) is a commune in Seine-Saint-Denis, Île-de-France. It is considered part of the eastern suburbs of Paris, France. It is located 11.8 km (7.3 mi) from the center of Paris.

The composer Alain Margoni was born in Neuilly-Plaisance on 13 October 1934.

== History ==
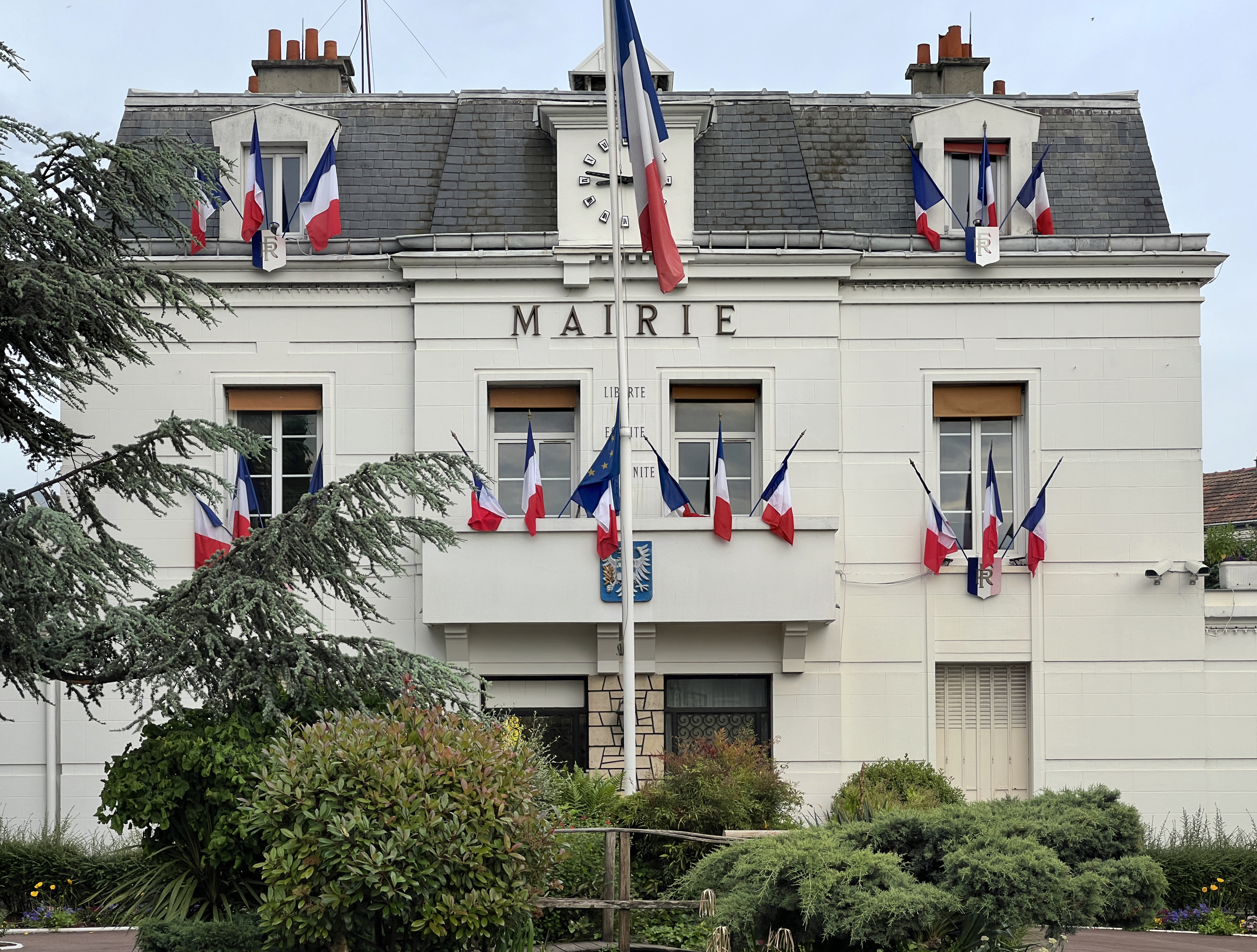
The Hôtel de Ville

The Hôtel de Ville was commissioned as a private residence and completed in around 1865.

The commune of Neuilly-Plaisance was created on 13 April 1892 by detaching its territory from the commune of Neuilly-sur-Marne.

The first community of Emmaus was established in this commune in 1949.

=== Heraldry ===
Arms of Neuilly-Plaisance	The arms of Neuilly-Plaisance are blazoned : Azure, an eagle displayed argent maintaining in dextre talon a laurel branch palewise or, and on an inescutcheon overall argent, a fess wavy azure and in chief a Latin cross gules between 2 crescents inverted vert. (the base arms are those of LE RAGOIS de BRETONVILLIERS, the superimposed ones of FOULQUES de Neuilly.

== Population ==
Historical population

Year	Pop.	±% p.a.
1896	4,663	—
1901	5,609	+3.76%
1906	6,441	+2.80%
1911	7,014	+1.72%
1921	9,094	+2.63%
1926	10,773	+3.45%
1931	12,148	+2.43%
1936	12,073	−0.12%
1946	11,842	−0.19%
1954	13,211	+1.38%

Year	Pop.	±% p.a.
1962	15,526	+2.04%
1968	17,613	+2.12%
1975	18,185	+0.46%
1982	16,960	−0.99%
1990	18,195	+0.88%
1999	18,236	+0.03%
2007	20,156	+1.26%
2012	20,755	+0.59%
2017	21,150	+0.38%
2023	21,941	+0.61%

Source: EHESS and INSEE (1968-2023)

== Transport ==
Neuilly-Plaisance is served by Neuilly-Plaisance station on Paris RER line.

== Education ==
Schools:

- Preschools/nurseries (maternelles): Bel Air, Paul Doumer, Foch, Léon Frapié, Paul Letombe, Victor Hugo
- Elementary schools: Bel Air, Cahouettes, Centre, Edouard Herriot, Joffre, Victor Hugo
- Junior high school: Collège Jean Moulin

== See also ==
- Communes of the Seine-Saint-Denis department
- Montgomery, Ohio, USA, sister city of Neuilly-Plaisance
