= Emmaus (charity) =

International poverty and homelessness charity

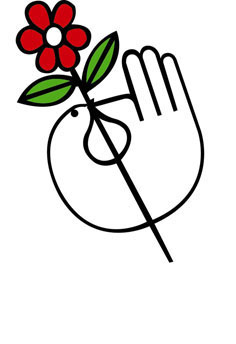
- Official logo of the Emmaus International organisation, since November 2014
- Founded: 1949
- Founder: Abbé Pierre
- Type: Not-for-profit
- Purpose: Poverty, exclusion and homelessness
- Location: Paris, France
- Region served: International
- Website: www.emmaus-international.org

Emmaus (French: Emmaüs, pronounced [e.ma.ys]) is an international solidarity movement founded in Paris in 1949 by Catholic priest and Capuchin friar Abbé Pierre to combat poverty and homelessness. Since 1971 regional and national initiatives have been grouped under a parent organization, Emmaus International, now run by Jean Rousseau, representing 425 groups in 41 countries, offering a range of charitable services.

Emmaus is a secular organisation, but communities around the world have kept the name because of its symbolism. The biblical story, found in the Gospel of Luke, describes how two men saw the resurrected Jesus on the road to the town of Emmaus, and so regained hope. The organization's guiding principle can be found in the Universal Manifesto of Emmaus International:

Serve those worse off than yourself before yourself. Serve the most needy first.

== History ==
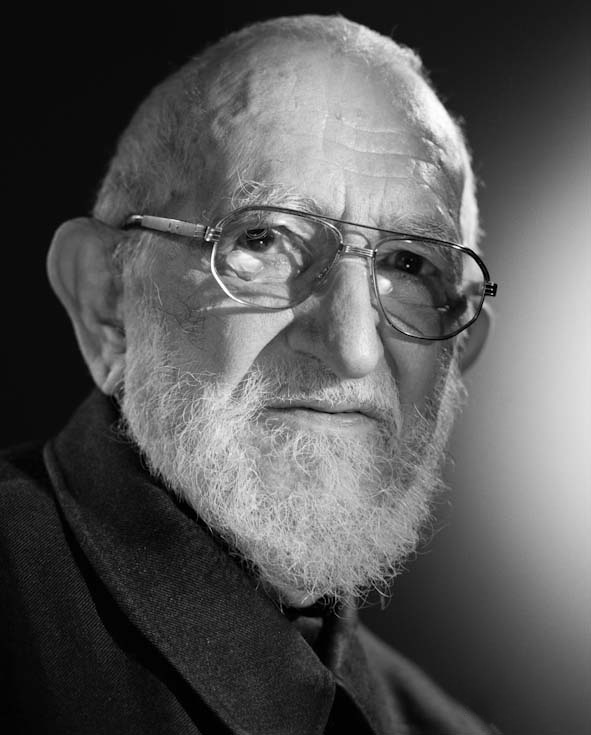
Abbé Pierre, founder of the Emmaus movement

The first Emmaus Community was founded by Father Henri-Antoine Groues (known as Abbé Pierre) in Paris in 1949 following the Second World War. The former Resistance member was also an MP who fought to provide accommodation for the homeless people of Paris. He was assisted by another former Resistance member, Lucie Coutaz.

As Paris faced poor living conditions and a lack of housing, father Pierre opened up his house to a group of those in need. He only set one condition: for them to help others. In 1947, Pierre rented a dilapidated home in Neuilly-Plaisance, 14 km east from Paris. He rebuilt the house and opened an international youth centre, which he named "Emaús", as a symbol of renovated hope. In 1949, he invited Georges Legay to become the first Emmaús Companion. Georges, a former convict who had attempted suicide in the Seine, helped to build temporary homes for those in need (initially in the priest's own garden), and then on any land they could obtain.

While Emaús was created by a Catholic priest, the intention behind it was to be a movement open to those of all nationalities and ethnic origins, without any distinction to separate individuals, ignoring any political convictions, spiritual or religious of those seeking help.

Initially, Emaús was sustained with Abbé Pierre's own salary. In 1951, lacking money, Abbé Pierre began to ask for money in the streets of Paris. Other members of the group then proposed that they should search the trash of Paris, to obtain and sell all that they could obtain.

From Parliament in 1951, Abbé Pierre dedicated himself to the homeless cause. He struggled to pay Georges and the first 18 members of the Emmaus Community. The priest was rebuffed by his Church for begging at restaurants and so organised 'rag pickers' to collect unwanted items for resale. This formed the basis of Emmaus Communities raising funds and using profits to help others.

When the harsh French winter of 1954 hit, many homeless people died in the streets. As a result, Abbé Pierre launched a campaign for donations on Radio Luxembourg: "Friends, this is a call for help. A woman has just frozen to death tonight, near boulevard Sebastopol, in her hands, an eviction note". In the following days, more than 2000 tonnes of donations were seen.

== International movement ==
During the 1950s, in many countries, communities imitating Abbé Pierre's actions emerged, following his practices as a model. In 1969, in Bern, Switzerland, 60 groups of people from 20 countries adopted the Universal Manifesto of the Emaús movement, deciding to create a general international secretary.

In 1971, the Emaús movement became the International Emaús. The preamble of the organisation's manifesto states:

Our name, Emaús, is one of a Palestinian city where those who were desperate found hope ahain. This name evokes in all, whether believers or not, our common conviction in which only love can unite us and help us move forward together.

The objective of this movement is "to act for every human, every society, every nation, so they can live and share".

By 2017 there were 400 Emmaus organisations in 44 countries.

== Emmaus in the UK ==
The first British Emmaus Community appeared in Cambridge in 1992. It was set up by Selwyn Image, who had been a student volunteer at an Emmaus Community in Paris. The charity provides formerly homeless people with a home and work, usually collecting, sorting and reselling donated furniture and household goods. Emmaus UK acts as a central resource to local Emmaus Communities across the UK. As of September 2016, there are 28 Emmaus Communities operating in the UK, with others under development. These communities provide accommodation and meaningful work for formerly homeless people.

== People involved or associated with Emmaus ==
- Abbé Pierre
- Terry Waite
- Queen Camilla
- HomeSense
- Mehran Karimi Nasseri
- Tracy Edwards
- David Kirk

== See also ==
- Emmaus Mouvement
- Emmabuntüs
- Poverty reduction
