= Montreuil, Seine-Saint-Denis =

Montreuil
- Commune
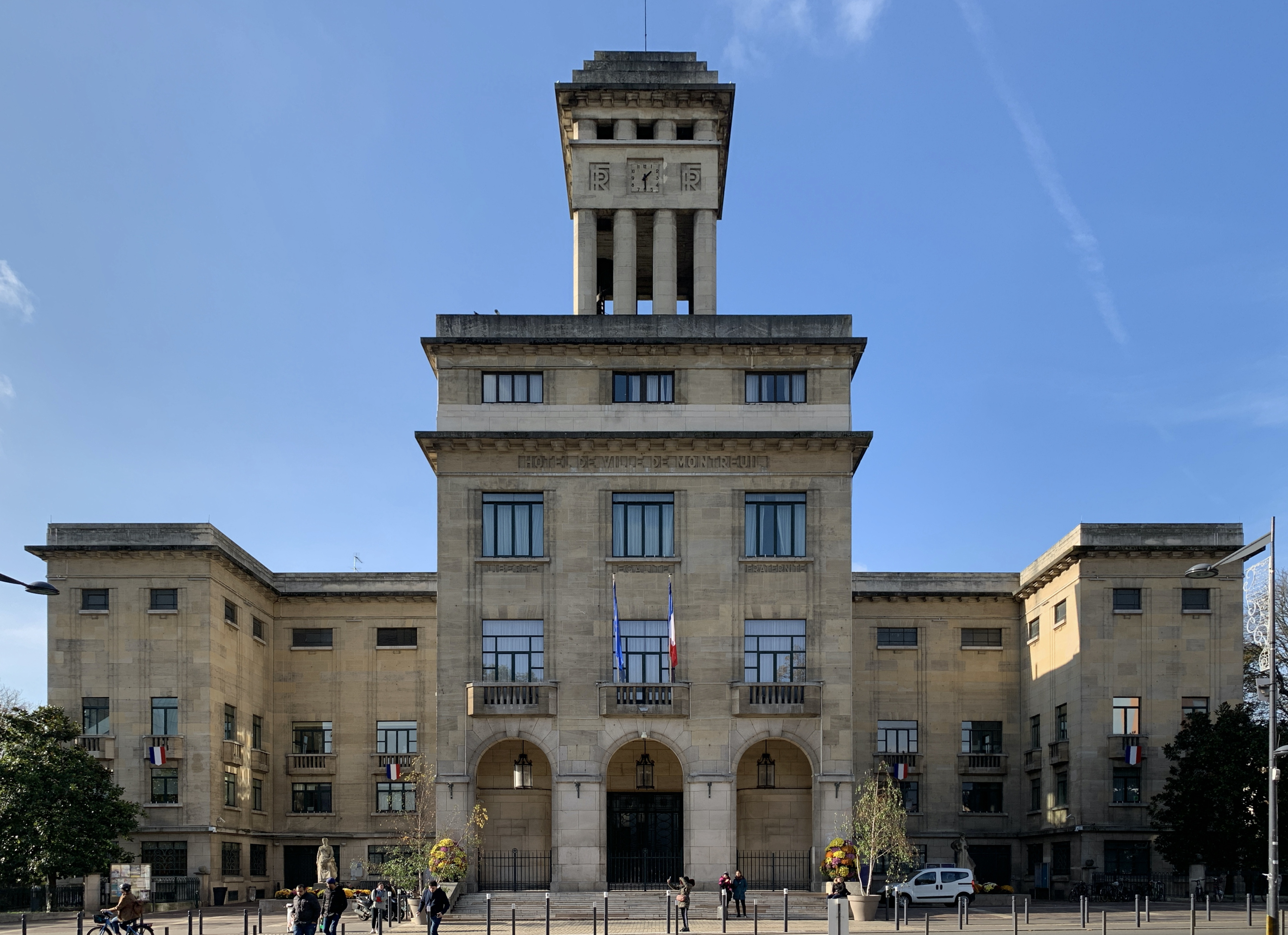
- The Hôtel de Ville

- Coat of arms

- Location (in red) within Paris inner suburbs
- Location of Montreuil
- Location within France Location within Île-de-France (region)
- Coordinates: 48°51′40″N 2°26′37″E
- Country: France
- Region: Île-de-France
- Department: Seine-Saint-Denis
- Arrondissement: Bobigny
- Canton: Montreuil-1 and 2
- Intercommunality: Grand Paris

Government
  - Mayor (2026–32): Patrice Bessac (PCF)
- Area^{1}: 8.92 km^{2} (3.44 sq mi)
- Elevation: 70 m (230 ft)
- Highest elevation: 117 m (384 ft)
- Lowest elevation: 52 m (171 ft)
- Population (2023): 111,934
  - Density: 12,500/km^{2} (32,500/sq mi)
- Time zone: UTC+01:00 (CET)
  - Summer (DST): UTC+02:00 (CEST)
- INSEE/Postal code: 93048 /93100
- ^{1} French Land Register data, which excludes lakes, ponds, glaciers > 1 km^{2} (0.386 sq mi or 247 acres) and river estuaries.

Montreuil (French pronunciation: [mɔ̃tʁœj]), also known unofficially as Montreuil-sous-Bois (pronounced [mɔ̃tʁœj su bwa]), is a commune in the eastern suburbs of Paris, France. It is located 6.6 km (4.1 mi) from the centre of Paris, in the Seine-Saint-Denis department and in the Métropole du Grand Paris. With a population of about 112,000, Montreuil is the third most populous suburb of Paris after Saint-Denis and Boulogne-Billancourt. It is located north of Paris's Bois de Vincennes (in the 12th arrondissement), on the border with Val-de-Marne.

== Name ==
The name Montreuil was recorded for the first time in a royal edict of 722 as Monasteriolum, meaning "little monastery" in Medieval Latin. The settlement of Montreuil started as a group of houses built around a small Merovingian monastery.

== History ==
A small monastery was recorded on the site during the Merovingian period on a hill that overlooked Vincennes, which is most likely where Montreuil gained its name.

Under the reigns of Louis XIV and Louis XVI the "Peach Walls" which provided the royal court with the fruits were located in Montreuil. It was also later home to the Lumière brothers and Georges Méliès whose workshops were located in lower Montreuil.

On 1 January 1860, the city of Paris was enlarged by annexing neighboring communes. On that occasion, the commune of Charonne was disbanded and divided between the city of Paris, Montreuil, and Bagnolet. Montreuil received a small part of the territory of Charonne.

Today Montreuil is divided into several districts:

- Le bas Montreuil (which joins together the old workshops (bordering on Saint-Mandé), the marché aux puces (bordering on Paris, carries of Montreuil),
- The Mairie (the malls, la croix de Chavaux, the Hôtel de Ville (town hall), and the Church of St Peter and St Paul),
- La Noue (parc des Guilands, city of du Val, Robespierre, bordering on Bagnolet),
- Le Bel Air (Jean Moulin housing estate, park des Beaumonts, city of Bel Air, city of Grand Pechers),
- La Boissière (all the north of Montreuil including parc Montreau and parc des Beaumonts, bordering on Romainville, Noisy-le-Sec, Rosny-sous-Bois and Fontenay-sous-Bois).

=== Main artistic heritage ===
- Decorations (ceramics and frescoes) in the state school "Voltaire" by Maurice Boitel (1954).
- Many definitive street art murals on several buildings of the city, like the tribute to Frantz Fanon, French psychiatrist and philosopher from the French overseas department of Martinique (boulevard Théophile Sueur).
- "Au temps d'harmonie", pointillist painting from famous 19th century French painter Paul Signac, in the town hall.
- Polyptych (enamels), in the cathedral entrance of the Georges Méliès student residence by Guillaume Bottazzi.

=== Heraldry ===
Arms of Montreuil	The herald arms of Montreuil is coloured as follows: Azur-coloured base, one gold-coloured chevron between three golden peach branches, and in center top a golden Fleur-de-lis . or Azure, a Chevron Or between three Peach branches Or fructed and in centre chief point a Fleur-de-lis Or.

== Geography ==
=== Climate ===
Montreuil has an oceanic climate (Köppen climate classification Cfb). The average annual temperature in Montreuil is 12.0 °C (53.6 °F). The average annual rainfall is 669.9 mm (26.37 in) with May as the wettest month. The temperatures are highest on average in July, at around 20.2 °C (68.4 °F), and lowest in January, at around 4.6 °C (40.3 °F). The highest temperature ever recorded in Montreuil was 40.0 °C (104.0 °F) on 25 July 2019 and 12 August 2003; the coldest temperature ever recorded was −17.7 °C (0.1 °F) on 17 January 1985.

Climate data for Montreuil (1981−2010 normals, extremes 1981−present)
Month	Jan	Feb	Mar	Apr	May	Jun	Jul	Aug	Sep	Oct	Nov	Dec	Year
Record high °C (°F)	16.0 (60.8)	21.0 (69.8)	25.5 (77.9)	30.5 (86.9)	33.0 (91.4)	37.5 (99.5)	40.0 (104.0)	40.0 (104.0)	35.0 (95.0)	30.0 (86.0)	22.5 (72.5)	17.0 (62.6)	40.0 (104.0)
Mean daily maximum °C (°F)	7.1 (44.8)	8.1 (46.6)	12.0 (53.6)	15.2 (59.4)	19.3 (66.7)	22.4 (72.3)	25.0 (77.0)	24.7 (76.5)	20.9 (69.6)	16.2 (61.2)	10.6 (51.1)	7.4 (45.3)	15.8 (60.4)
Daily mean °C (°F)	4.6 (40.3)	5.1 (41.2)	8.3 (46.9)	10.9 (51.6)	14.8 (58.6)	17.8 (64.0)	20.2 (68.4)	19.9 (67.8)	16.5 (61.7)	12.6 (54.7)	7.9 (46.2)	5.1 (41.2)	12.0 (53.6)
Mean daily minimum °C (°F)	2.2 (36.0)	2.1 (35.8)	4.6 (40.3)	6.6 (43.9)	10.3 (50.5)	13.2 (55.8)	15.4 (59.7)	15.0 (59.0)	12.1 (53.8)	9.0 (48.2)	5.2 (41.4)	2.9 (37.2)	8.3 (46.9)
Record low °C (°F)	−17.7 (0.1)	−12.5 (9.5)	−8.5 (16.7)	−2.7 (27.1)	1.0 (33.8)	4.8 (40.6)	8.0 (46.4)	7.0 (44.6)	4.0 (39.2)	−2.0 (28.4)	−7.5 (18.5)	−9.2 (15.4)	−17.7 (0.1)
Average precipitation mm (inches)	53.3 (2.10)	44.3 (1.74)	51.1 (2.01)	52.3 (2.06)	65.6 (2.58)	56.9 (2.24)	57.8 (2.28)	52.9 (2.08)	52.1 (2.05)	63.1 (2.48)	56.7 (2.23)	63.8 (2.51)	669.9 (26.37)
Average precipitation days (≥ 1.0 mm)	10.8	10.3	10.8	9.6	10.3	8.7	8.1	8.0	8.1	9.9	11.0	11.8	117.5
Source: Météo-France

== Demographics ==
=== Population ===
Historical population

Year	Pop.	±% p.a.
1793	3,763	—
1800	3,879	+0.43%
1806	3,950	+0.30%
1821	3,006	−1.80%
1831	3,314	+0.98%
1836	3,546	+1.36%
1841	3,718	+0.95%
1846	3,620	−0.53%
1851	3,810	+1.03%
1856	4,311	+2.50%
1861	6,871	+9.77%
1866	9,235	+6.09%
1872	12,295	+4.89%
1876	13,607	+2.57%
1881	18,693	+6.56%
1886	21,541	+2.88%
1891	23,986	+2.17%
1896	27,087	+2.46%
1901	31,773	+3.24%

Year	Pop.	±% p.a.
1906	35,904	+2.47%
1911	43,217	+3.78%
1921	51,026	+1.67%
1926	58,521	+2.78%
1931	70,450	+3.78%
1936	71,803	+0.38%
1946	69,838	−0.28%
1954	76,252	+1.10%
1962	92,207	+2.40%
1968	95,698	+0.62%
1975	96,587	+0.13%
1982	93,368	−0.48%
1990	94,754	+0.18%
1999	90,674	−0.49%
2007	102,097	+1.49%
2012	103,520	+0.28%
2017	109,897	+1.20%
2023	111,934	+0.31%

Source: EHESS and INSEE (1968-2023)

=== Immigration ===
Place of birth of residents of Montreuil in 1999
Born in metropolitan France	Born outside metropolitan France			
73.1%	26.9%			
73.1%	Born in overseas France	Born in foreign countries with French citizenship at birth^{1}	EU-15 immigrants^{2}	Non-EU-15 immigrants
73.1%	2.3%	2.8%	4.8%	17.0%
^{1} This group is made up largely of former French settlers, such as pieds-noirs in Northwest Africa, followed by former colonial citizens who had French citizenship at birth (such as was often the case for the native elite in French colonies), as well as to a lesser extent foreign-born children of French expatriates. A foreign country is understood as a country not part of France in 1999, so a person born for example in 1950 in Algeria, when Algeria was an integral part of France, is nonetheless listed as a person born in a foreign country in French statistics.^{2} An immigrant is a person born in a foreign country not having French citizenship at birth. An immigrant may have acquired French citizenship since moving to France, but is still considered an immigrant in French statistics. On the other hand, persons born in France with foreign citizenship (the children of immigrants) are not listed as immigrants.

Montreuil's inhabitants often exaggeratedly nickname the town the "second Malian town after Bamako", or sometimes "Mali-sous-Bois" or "Bamako-sur-Seine" even though the Seine does not cross the town. Montreuil has indeed a very important Malian population: more than 2,000 inhabitants according to the INSEE in 1999, between 6,000 and 10,000 people according to the mairie, which estimates that Montreuil has the largest Malian community in France. 10% of the population is Malian or has Malian origins.

== Administration ==
The mayor of Montreuil is the member of Parti communiste français Patrice Bessac, who was elected on the second round of 2014 municipal elections, defeating the former ex-Communist mayor Jean-Pierre Brard in a four-way second round. He was re-elected in the first round of the 2020 elections with 51.34% votes, though with 33.67% participation (down from 53.11% in the 2014 election) due to the COVID-19 crisis (which also caused a delay of the 2nd turn in other cities). He was re-elected in 2026.

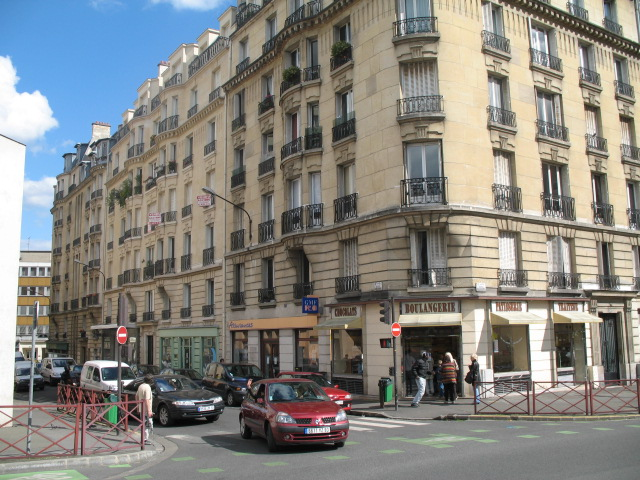
Streets in Montreuil

The city is divided into two cantons: canton of Montreuil-1 and canton of Montreuil-2.

== Economy ==
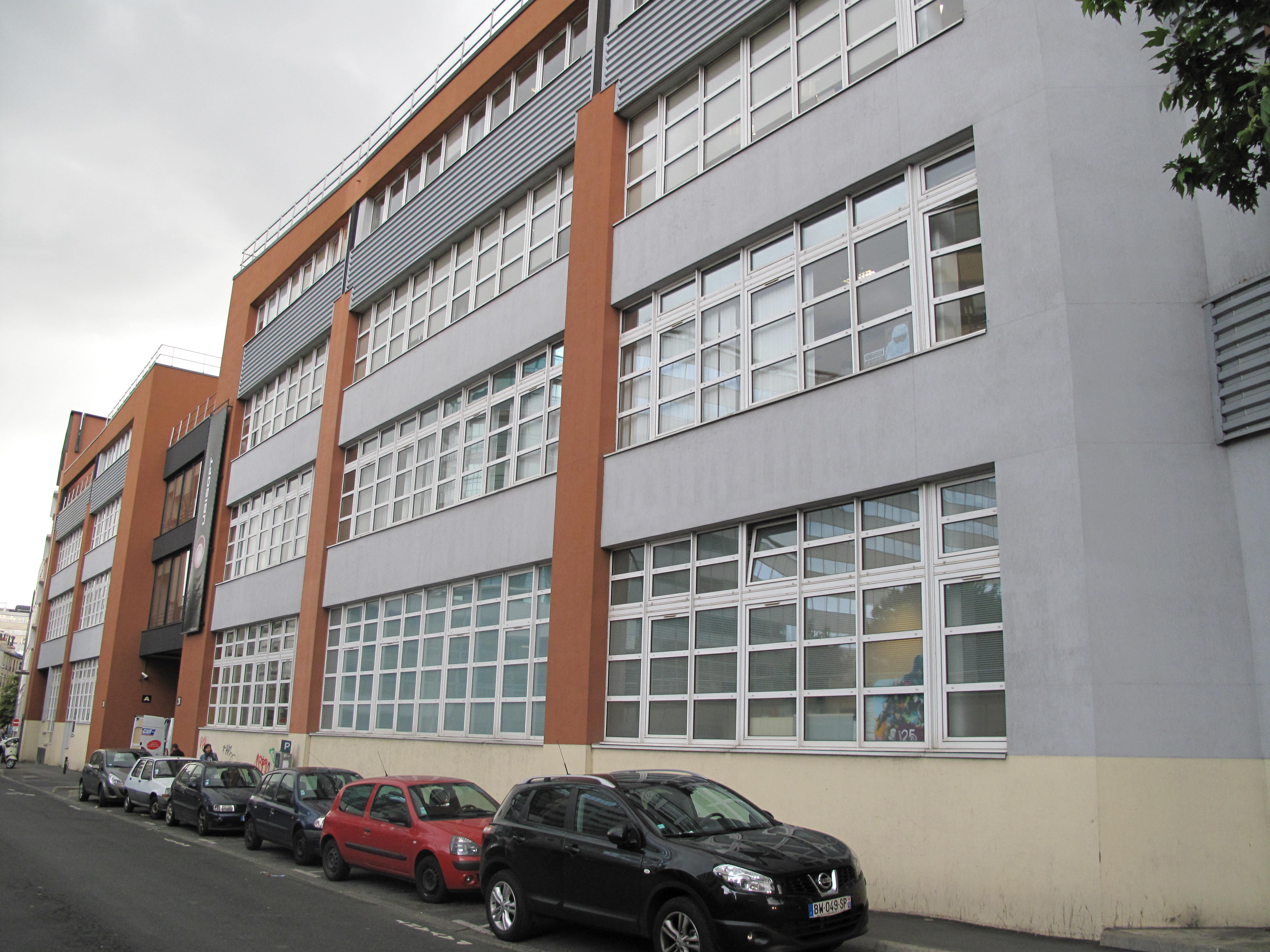
Ubisoft administrative head office in Montreuil

Video game company Ubisoft has its corporate head office in Montreuil. The Air France Paris office (of Air France-KLM) is in Montreuil.

== Education ==
The commune's educational services are operated out of the Opale B Administrative Building. Montreuil has eight collèges, three lycées, two lycées techniques, and the IUT of the University of Paris 8.

Senior high schools/sixth form colleges:

- Lycée Eugénie-Cotton
- Lycée Jean Jaurès
- Lycée Condorcet

The Montreuil Library (Bibliothèque de Montreuil) consists of the Robert-Desnos Central Library, the Daniel-Renoult Library, the Colonel-Fabien Library, and the Paul-Eluard Library. Robert-Desnos, in a park near the commune's town hall, is the largest library in the commune. It houses a music library and Internet access points. Daniel-Renoult, near Montreau Park, serves the Montreau-Ruffins Théophile Sueur community. Colonel-Fabien, in the Ramenas-Fabien-Léo Lagrange community, is near the Intercommunal Hospital. Paul-Eluard is near the La Grande Porte shopping centre and is within 50 metres (160 ft) of the Robespierre Paris Métro station and Rue de Paris.

== Notable residents and personalities ==
- Djamel Abdoun, Algerian footballer who played at the 2010 FIFA World Cup
- Mehdi Abeid, Algerian footballer
- Nicolas Aithadi, Visual Effects, Guardians of the Galaxy
- Jean-Claude Andruet, rally driver
- Oumar Bakari, footballer
- Vicki Bècho, footballer for France
- Rosette Bir, sculptor
- Sacha Boey, footballer
- Élodie Bouchez, actress
- Jacques Brel, singer/songwriter/actor
- Souarata Cisse, basketball player
- Olivier Dacourt, footballer
- Henri Decaë, cinematographer
- Jean Delannoy, director
- Yehvann Diouf, Senegalese Footballer
- Emmanuel Flipo, artist
- Pape Gueye, footballer
- Christophe Guilluy, geographer
- Adèle Haenel, actress
- Helno (Noël Rota) (1963-1993), singer with Lucrate Milk, Bérurier Noir & Les Négresses Vertes
- William Mallet, perpetrator of the 2022 Paris shooting
- Ethan Mbappé, footballer
- Pierre de Montreuil, 13th century architect, died in 1267 in Paris
- Nordi Mukiele, footballer
- Sikou Niakate, footballer
- Elisha Owusu, footballer
- Prince Waly, rapper
- Émile Reynaud, director
- Mamadou Samassa, footballer
- Gaston-Auguste Schweitzer, sculptor
- Abel Thermeus, footballer
- Tignous, cartoonist and activist killed in the Charlie Hebdo shooting
- Frédéric Verger, writer
- Warren Zaïre-Emery, footballer

== Transport ==
Montreuil is served by three stations on Paris Métro Line 9: Robespierre, Croix de Chavaux, and Mairie de Montreuil.

There are several new Métro (Line 11 - Montreuil-Hôpital) and tramway (extension of the T1 tramway) stations under construction. The region is also working on the extension of the Métro Line 1 to Val-de-Fontenay, with a possible new station in the East of Montreuil (Grands Pêchers).

== International relations ==
Montreuil is twinned with Cottbus, Brandenburg, Germany and a few other towns and cities of Africa, Asia and Europe.

== See also ==
- Hornec gang
- Gaston-Auguste Schweitzer Birthplace of this sculptor
- Pierre de Montreuil
- Musée de l'Histoire vivante
