= Church of St. Peter and St. Paul (Montreuil, Seine-Saint-Denis) =

Church in Montreuil, Seine-Saint-Denis, France

Church of St. Peter and St. Paul, Montreuil
- Church of Saint Peter and Saint Paul du Haut-Montreuil
- French: Église Saint-Pierre-et-Saint-Paul-du-Haut-Montreuil
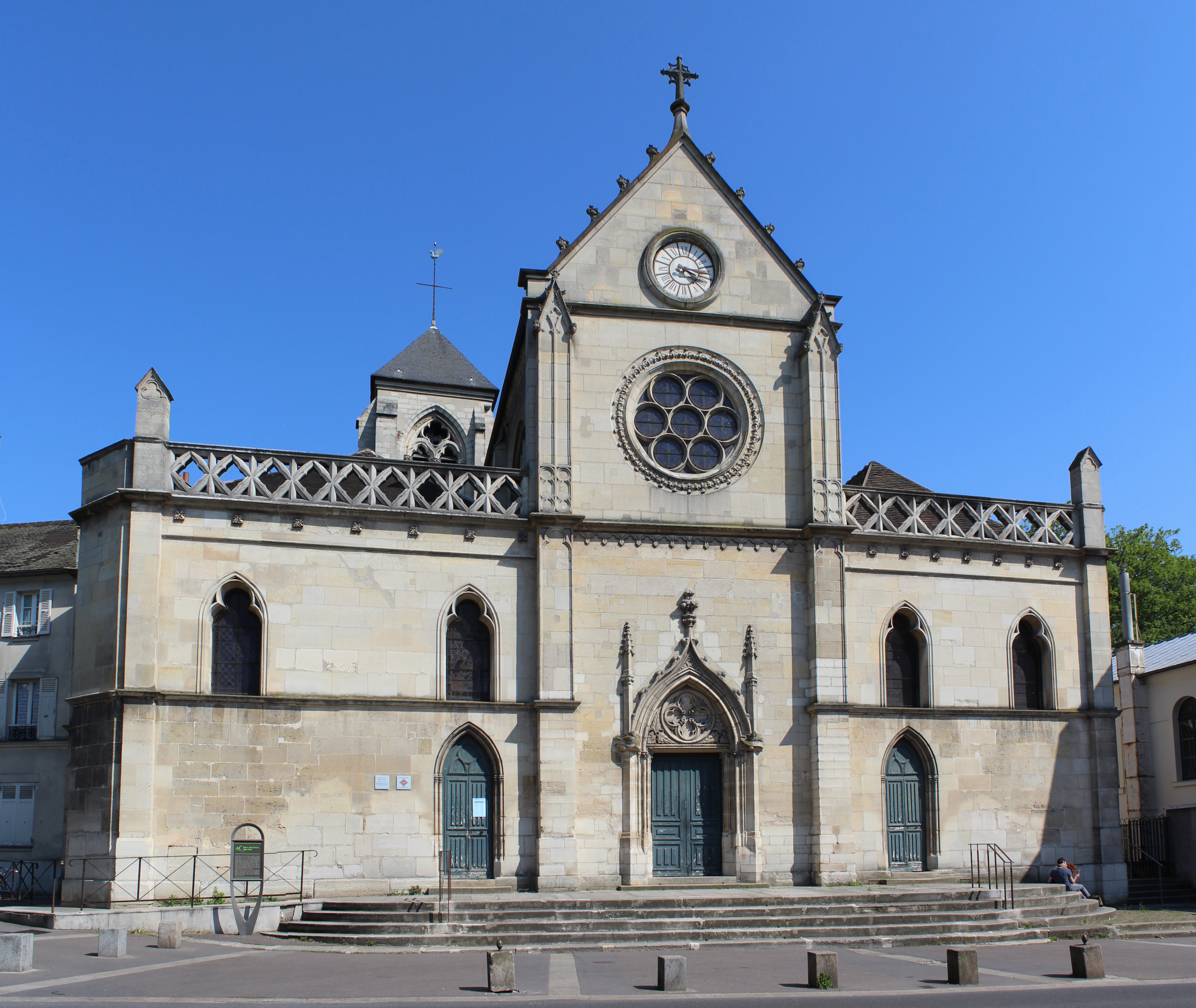

- Location in France
- 48°51′49″N 2°26′40″E
- Location: 2, Rue de Romainville; Montreuil, Seine-Saint-Denis, France
- Country: France
- Denomination: Roman Catholic

History
- Status: Church
- Dedication: Saints Peter and Paul

Architecture
- Functional status: Active
- Architectural type: Church
- Style: Gothic

Administration
- Diocese: Saint-Denis

Monument historique
- Official name: Eglise Saint-Pierre et Saint-Paul-du-Haut-Montreuil
- Criteria: Class MH
- Designated: 18 March 1813
- Reference no.: PA00079938

The church of St. Peter and St. Paul (French: église Saint-Pierre-et-Saint-Paul), formally the church of Saint Peter and Saint Paul du Haut-Montreuil, is a Roman Catholic church in Montreuil, Seine-Saint-Denis, France. It was the parish church of the royal Château de Vincennes.

== Location ==
The church is located at the crossing of Boulevard Henri-Barbusse, Rue Franklin and Rue de l'Église in the commune of Montreuil just east of Paris. The chevet is located at 2, Rue de Romainville.

== History ==
The parish of Montreuil was probably already formed in the Merovingian period as shown by the presence of a small monastery (Latin: monasteriolum) on a hill that overlooked Vincennes. This monastery was then probably the origin of the place name Montreuil.

In the 8th century, a royal decree testified the presence of a church on the site on the feast day of Sts. Peter and Paul (29 June). The current building replaced an earlier Romanesque church. The oldest part of the building is the choir from the late 12th and early 13th centuries. It was built by Louis IX (later Saint Louis) and is similar to the choir of Notre-Dame de Paris.

St. Peter and St. Paul was the parish church of the royal Château de Vincennes and was therefore attended and maintained by members of the French royal family between the 13th and the 16th centuries, which enabled the residents of Montreuil to pay fewer taxes. The church usually drew the royal family for Sunday and Easter services. At this time, Louis IX and his mother Blanche of Castile frequently attended religious services there. King Charles V and his future spouse Joanna of Bourbon were baptised together at St. Peter and St. Paul in 1375. In the 16th century, the royal family moved to the Palace of Fontainebleau and the Château de Saint-Germain and no longer attended the church of Montreuil regularly. However, it made donations for St. Peter and St. Paul until Notre-Dame de la Pissote became a parish church in Vincennes in the mid-17th century.

The central part of the façade was built in the 14th century, while the façade of an aisle was erected in the 15th century. The bell tower was built in the 14th and 15th centuries, with an interruption during the Hundred Years War. The great nave and the first three bays date back to the 15th century, while the side aisles with the baptismal font were added in the 18th century. In the 19th century, the bell tower was restored after its spire was destroyed by lightning in 1808. The church was completed in the 19th century with the construction of the chapel of Sainte-Geneviève.

St. Peter and St. Paul was listed as a Class Historic Monument in 1913.

By the end of the 20th century and the early 21st century, the church was highly deteriorated. The ceiling collapsed several times and the keystone of the nave broke away in 1986, which caused the church to be closed by 1993. After further restoration works that cost nearly €1,9 million, the renovated choir was inaugurated on March 10, 2007.

== Architecture ==
The church has a rectangular base, with a flat chevet and no transept. The triforium is characteristic of the early 13th-century Gothic style. Its arch frames three ribs in each bay.

Around 1980, tombs were excavated in front of the façade of the church.

Numerous small stakes reinforce the foundations of the church. The chevet wall is adorned with two wooden statues of Saints Peter and Paul topped by four bas-reliefs showing the Four Evangelists. A brass cross made by Jacques Dieudonné stands in the center.

== Gallery ==
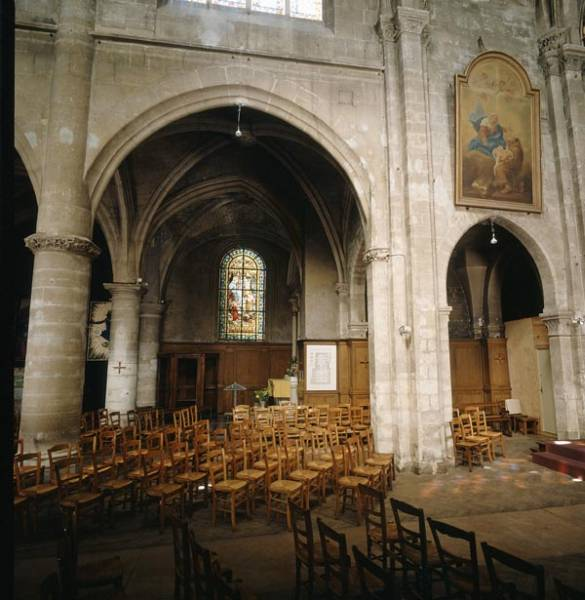
The interior of the church

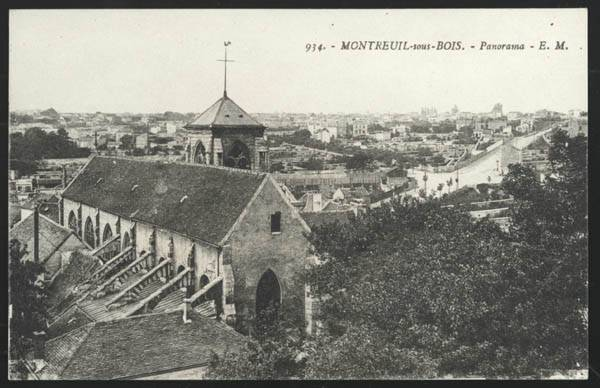
Old post card (ca. 1900) showing the church

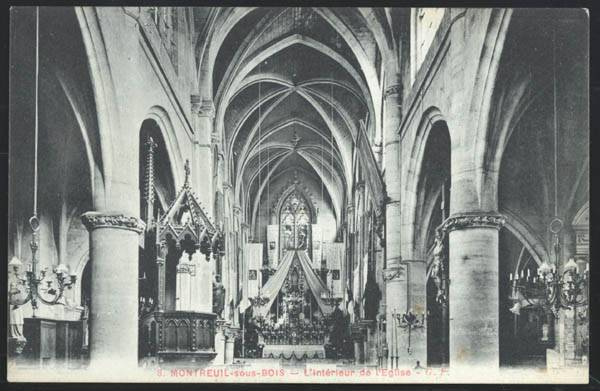
Old post card (ca. 1900) showing the interior of the church

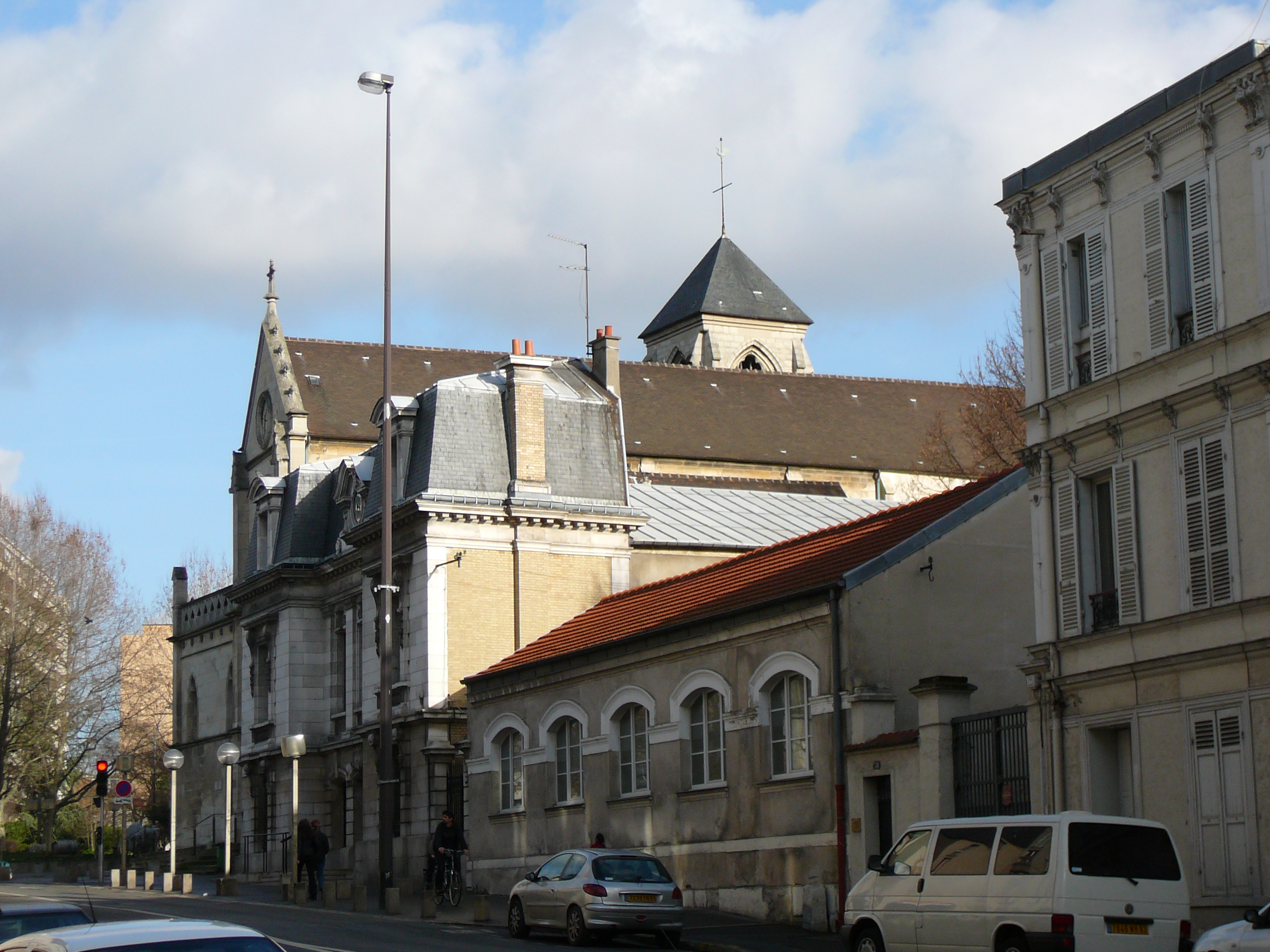
Current view of the church from Rue Franklin

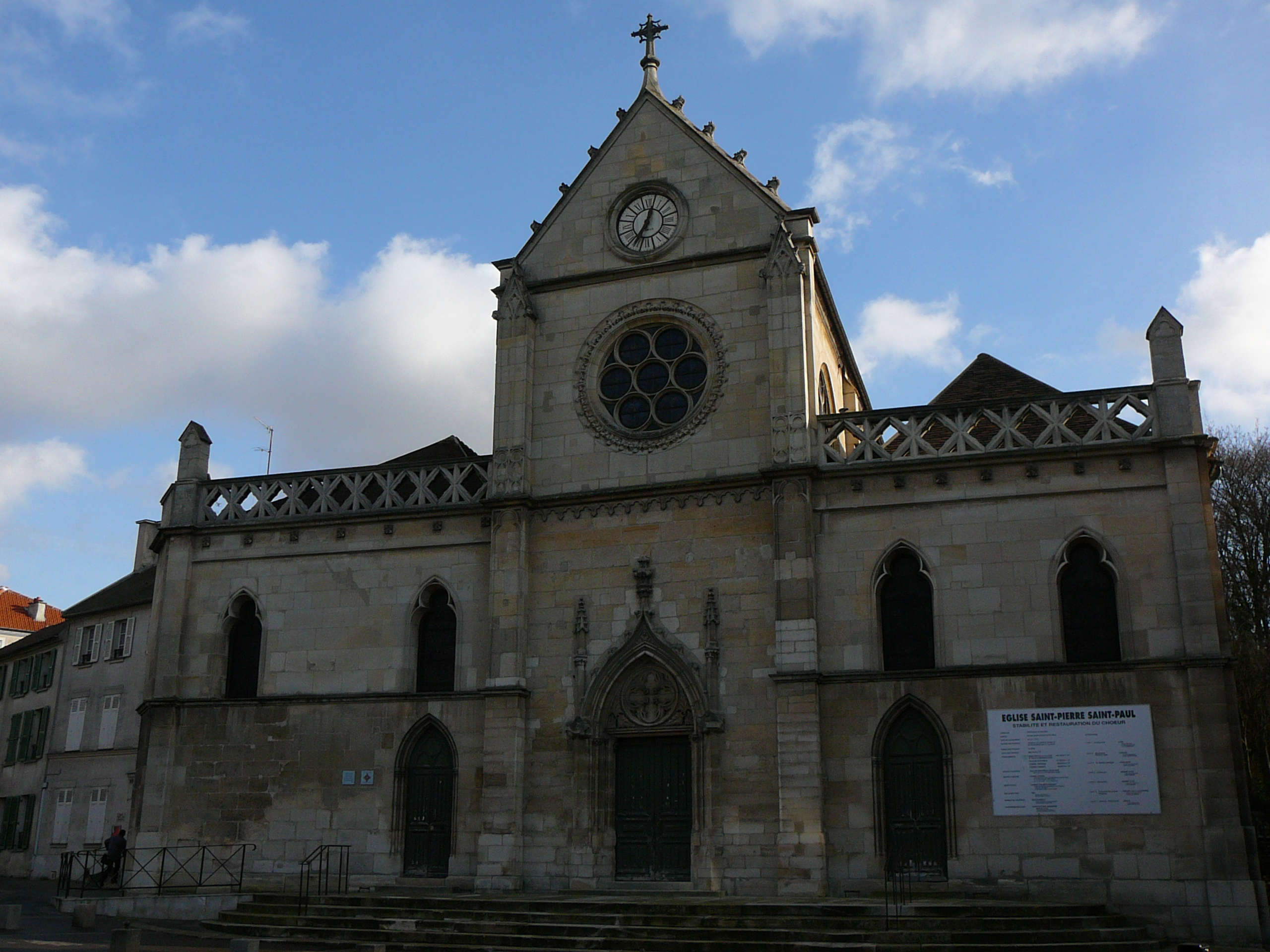
Current view of the façade

== Notable people ==
- Louis IX and his mother Blanche of Castile attended several services in the church
- Charles V and his future spouse Joanna of Bourbon were baptised there together in 1375
- Martin Prévost (1611–1691), settler of New France, was baptised at St. Peter and St. Paul on 4 January 1611
