= Hôtel de Ville, Rosny-sous-Bois =

Town hall in Rosny-sous-Bois, France

Hôtel de Ville
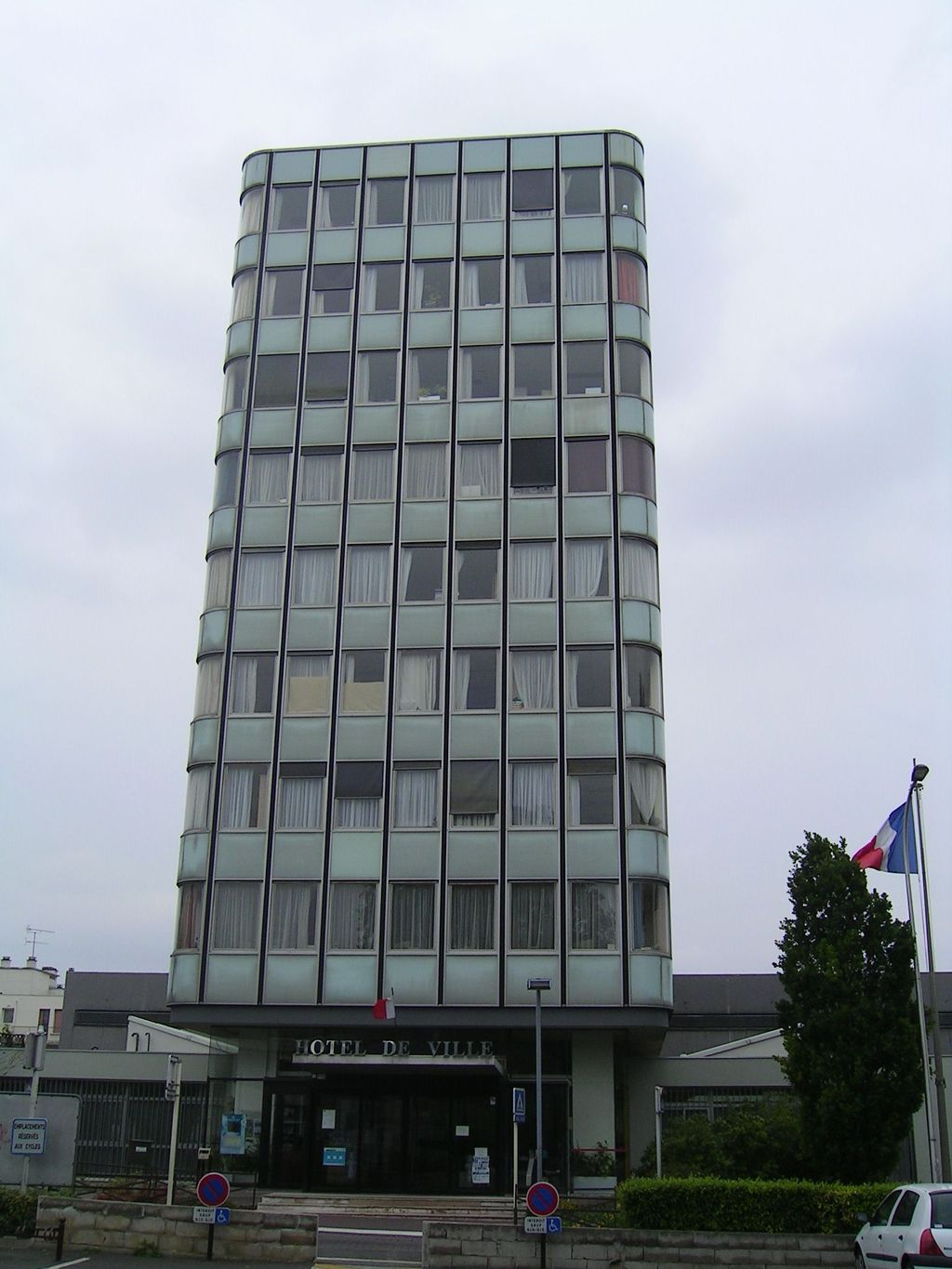
- The main frontage of the Hôtel de Ville in May 2007

General information
- Type: City hall
- Architectural style: Modern style
- Location: Rosny-sous-Bois, France
- Coordinates: 48.8720°N 2.4881°E
- Completed: 1964

Height
- Height: 32.42 meters (106.4 ft)

Design and construction
- Architect: Jean de Mailly

The Hôtel de Ville (French pronunciation: [otɛl də vil], City Hall) is a municipal building in Rosny-sous-Bois, Seine-Saint-Denis in the eastern suburbs of Paris, standing on Rue Claude Pernès.

== History ==
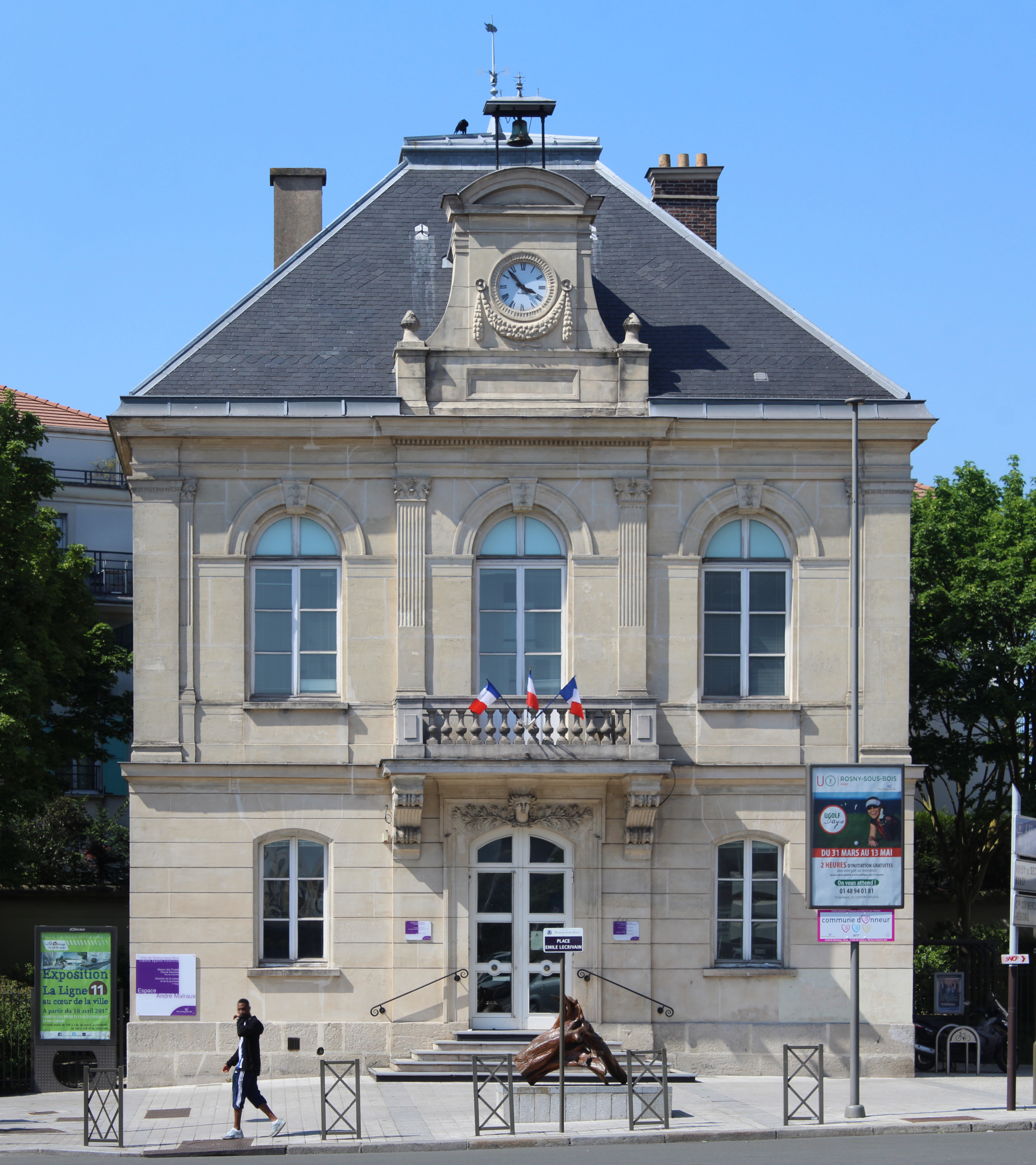
The old town hall

Following the French Revolution, the town council established a school and municipal office in a building opposite the Church of Sainte-Geneviève on Rue de l'Église (now Rue Saint-Denis). In 1828, the council acquired another building, No. 5 Rue de l'Église, from Madame Chalmandier and relocated the school and municipal office there. In November 1864, after the municipal office became too small, the council led by the mayor, Henri Ancelin Adolphe, decided to commission a dedicated town hall. The site they selected was on the corner of what is now Rue Paul Cavaré and Rue du Général Gallieni. The square-shaped building was designed by Claude Naissant in the neoclassical style, built in ashlar stone and was officially opened on 24 June 1868.

The design involved a symmetrical main frontage of three bays facing onto the corner of the two streets. The central bay featured a short flight of steps leading up to a segmental headed doorway with a keystone carved in the shape of a mask. It was flanked by brackets supported a balustraded balcony. On the first floor, there was a French door, which was flanked by Ionic order pilasters supporting an entablature and a cornice. Above the central bay was a clock which was flanked by pilasters supporting a round headed pediment. The outer bays were fenestrated by segmental headed windows on the ground floor and by round headed windows with moulded surrounds and keystones on the first floor, and there were Doric order pilasters at the first floor corners.

The building was damaged during the Franco-Prussian War in 1870: a plaque which had been installed to commemorate the opening of the building was lost during the war and was never recovered. The damage was repaired in 1889 and further restoration work took place in 1920. Since the late 1960s, the old town hall has served as the Espace André-Malraux, accommodating the culture and youth service and the archives department.

During the Second World War, one of the councillors, Edouard Beaulieu, was arrested, along with his son, on account of their communist sympathies and transported to Auschwitz concentration camp where they both died. After the war a plaque was installed in the town hall to commemorate their lives.

In the mid-20th century, the council led by the mayor, Philibert Hoffmann, decided to commission a modern town hall. The site they selected was at the northwest end of a property donated by a former deputy mayor, Richard Gardebled, in 1908. In accordance with Gardebled's bequest, the site had been cleared and put into use as a public park. The new building was designed by Jean de Mailly in the modern style, built in concrete and glass and was completed in 1964. The design involved an eight-storey tower with alternating bands of glass and cladding: it featured curved corners and sat on a podium facing onto Rue Claude Pernès. It was 32.42 meters (106.4 ft) high. Internally, the principal room was the Salle du Conseil (council chamber).
