= Canton of Montreuil-1 =

Coordinates: 48.87°N 2.44°E

The canton of Montreuil-1 is an administrative division of the Seine-Saint-Denis department, Île-de-France region, northern France. It was created at the French canton reorganisation which came into effect in March 2015. Its seat is in Montreuil.

It consists of the following communes:

1. Montreuil (partly)
2. Rosny-sous-Bois
