= Hôtel de Ville, Montreuil, Seine-Saint-Denis =

Town hall in Montreuil, Seine-Saint-Denis, France

Hôtel de Ville
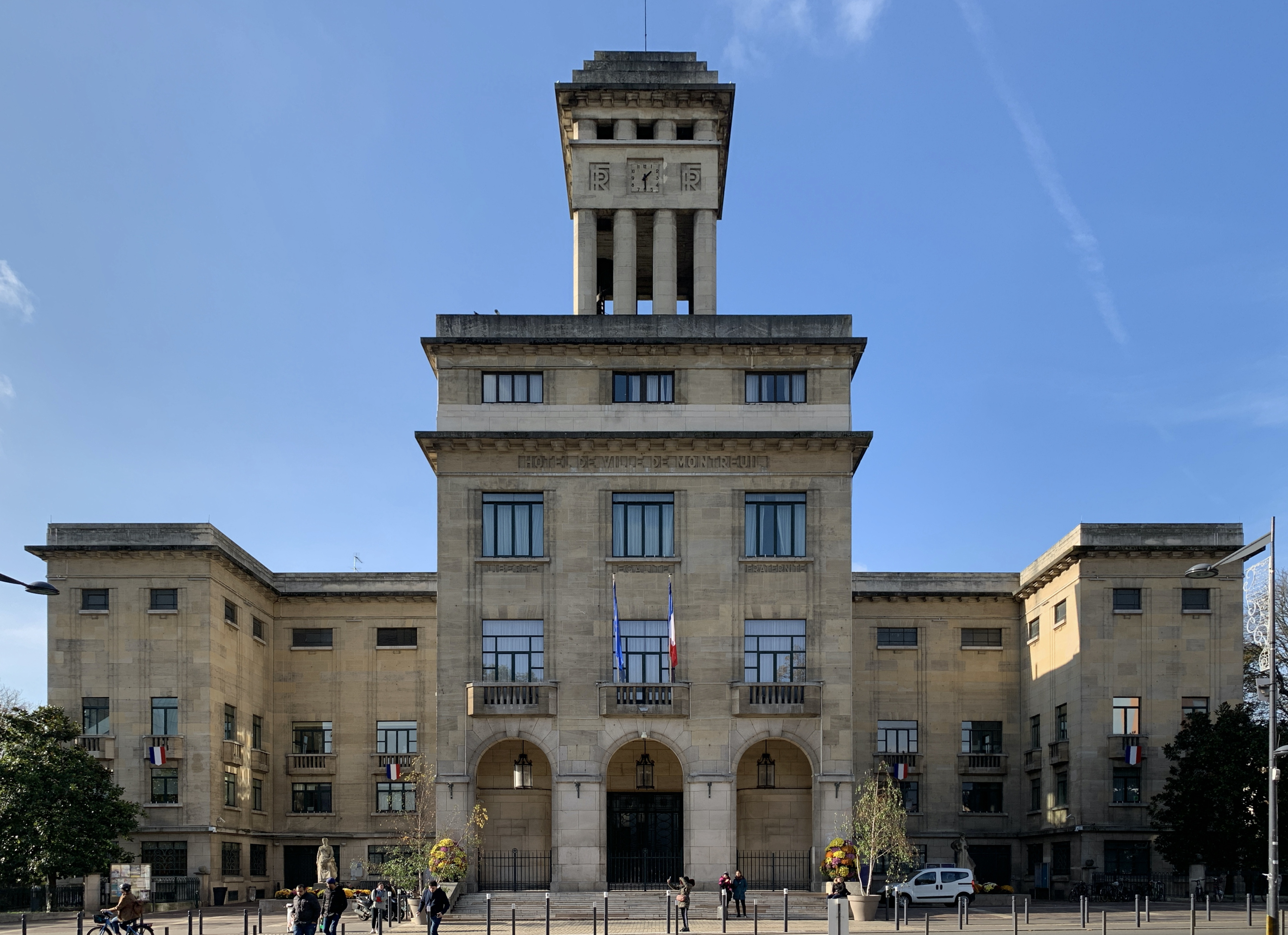
- The main frontage of the Hôtel de Ville in November 2019

General information
- Type: City hall
- Architectural style: Rationalist style
- Location: Montreuil, France
- Coordinates: 48.8624°N 2.4409°E
- Completed: 1935

Height
- Height: 40 metres (130 ft)

Design and construction
- Architect: Florent Nanquette

Monument historique
- Official name: Hôtel de ville
- Type: Inscrit
- Designated: 2024
- Reference no.: PA93000077

The Hôtel de Ville (French pronunciation: [otɛl də vil], City Hall) is a municipal building in Montreuil, Seine-Saint-Denis, in the eastern suburbs of Paris, standing on Place Jean Jaurès. It was designated a monument historique by the French government in 2024.

== History ==
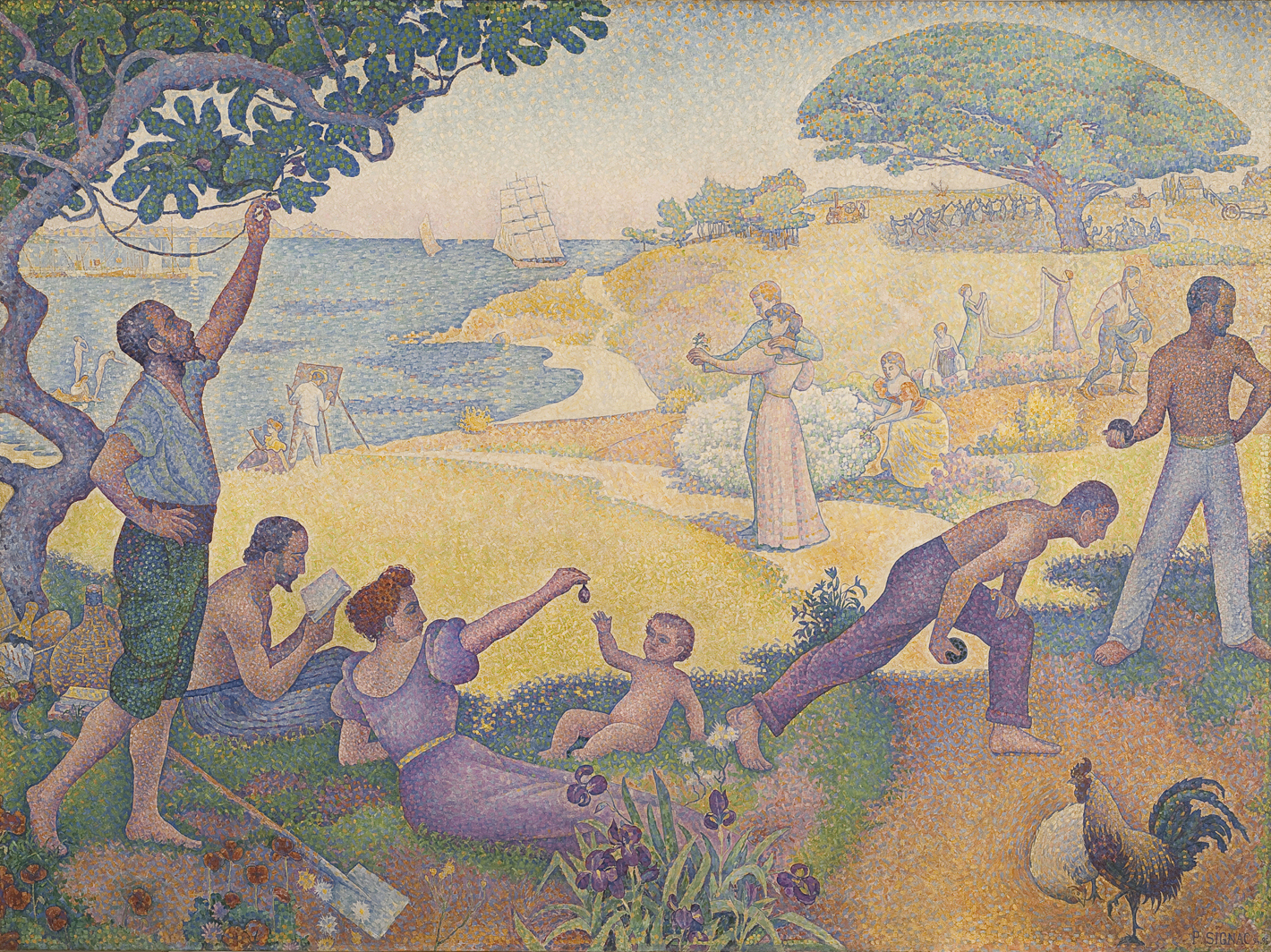
Au temps d'harmonie by Paul Signac

Following the French Revolution, meetings of the new town council took place in a building known as the Maison Commune. The council then relocated to a private house belonging to the Maupas family in Rue du Milieu (now Rue Victor-Hugo) in 1840. In the mid-19th century the council decided to commission a dedicated town hall. The site they selected was on a newly created square, Place Girard (now Place Jean Jaurès). Construction started in 1859. It was designed by Claude Naissant in the neoclassical style, built in ashlar stone and was completed in the early 1864. A stone which had been recovered from the Bastille, when it was demolished, was embedded in the building.

Following a significant increase in population in the early decades of the 20th century, the town council decided to create a new town hall, built around the old building. This concept proved too challenging to deliver and the old town hall was eventually demolished. The new building was designed by Florent Nanquette in the Rationalist style, built in ashlar stone and was officially opened in February 1935. The design involved a symmetrical main frontage of 11 bays, with the end sections, of two bays each, projected forward. The central section of three bays which was also projected forward featured three double height openings with voussoirs and keystones on the ground floor. There were casement windows on the upper floors, balconies in front of the windows above the openings, and prominent ledges projecting out above the upper floors. There was also a bell tower, which was 40 metres (130 ft) high, formed with four columns on each side, with clock faces attached, supporting a cornice and multi-tiered parapet. The wings and end sections were fenestrated in a similar style. Internally, the principal rooms were the Salle du Conseil (council chamber), Salle des Mariages (wedding room) and Salle des Fêtes (ballroom).

The council chamber was decorated with 12 paintings by Charles Fouqueray depicting important local historical events, the wedding room with four murals by Claude-Charles Bourgonnier depicting the seasons, and the ballroom with four murals by Roger Parent depicting dance, music, comedy and drama. Following the death of the painter Paul Signac in 1935, his widow presented a painting entitled Au temps d'harmonie to the town, and it was subsequently hung on the staircase.

On 17 August 1944, during the Second World War, elements of the Francs-Tireurs et Partisans stormed the town hall. This was nine days in advance of the official liberation of the town by the French 2nd Armoured Division, commanded by General Philippe Leclerc, on 26 August 1944. After the war, two statues representing agriculture and industry by Lucien Gibert and Édouard Manchuelle respectively were installed in front of the town hall.

Bins outside the town hall were set on fire during the Nahel Merzouk riots in June 2023.
