= Rosny-sous-Bois =

Commune in Île-de-France, France

- Commune
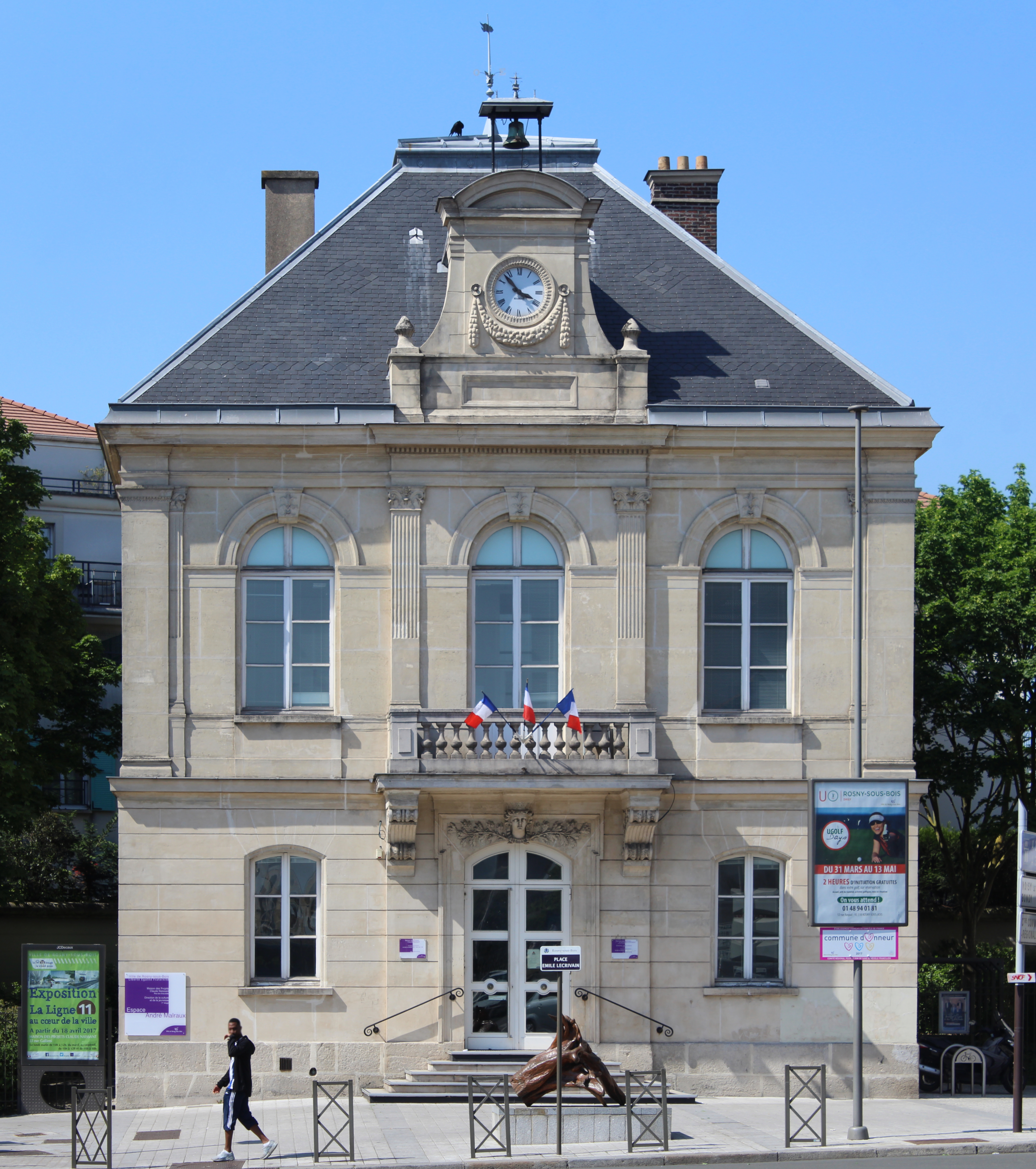
- The old Hôtel de Ville

- Coat of arms

- Location (in red) within Paris inner suburbs
- Location of Rosny-sous-Bois
- Location within France Location within Île-de-France (region)
- Coordinates: 48°52′00″N 2°29′00″E
- Country: France
- Region: Île-de-France
- Department: Seine-Saint-Denis
- Arrondissement: Le Raincy
- Canton: Montreuil-1
- Intercommunality: Grand Paris

Government
  - Mayor (2026–32): Magalie Thibault
- Area^{1}: 5.91 km^{2} (2.28 sq mi)
- Highest elevation: 116 m (381 ft)
- Lowest elevation: 45 m (148 ft)
- Population (2023): 47,180
  - Density: 7,980/km^{2} (20,700/sq mi)
- Time zone: UTC+01:00 (CET)
  - Summer (DST): UTC+02:00 (CEST)
- INSEE/Postal code: 93064 /93110
- ^{1} French Land Register data, which excludes lakes, ponds, glaciers > 1 km^{2} (0.386 sq mi or 247 acres) and river estuaries.

Rosny-sous-Bois (French: [ʁoni su bwɑ]) is a commune in the eastern suburbs of Paris, France. It is located 10.1 km (6.3 mi) from the centre of Paris.

It is the seat of the national centre of road information of the national gendarmerie.

== Toponymy ==
The name Rosny derives from the Latin Rodoniacum, probably meaning the 'estate of Rosinius', a Gallo-Roman landowner. Sous-Bois literally means 'under the woods'.

== History ==
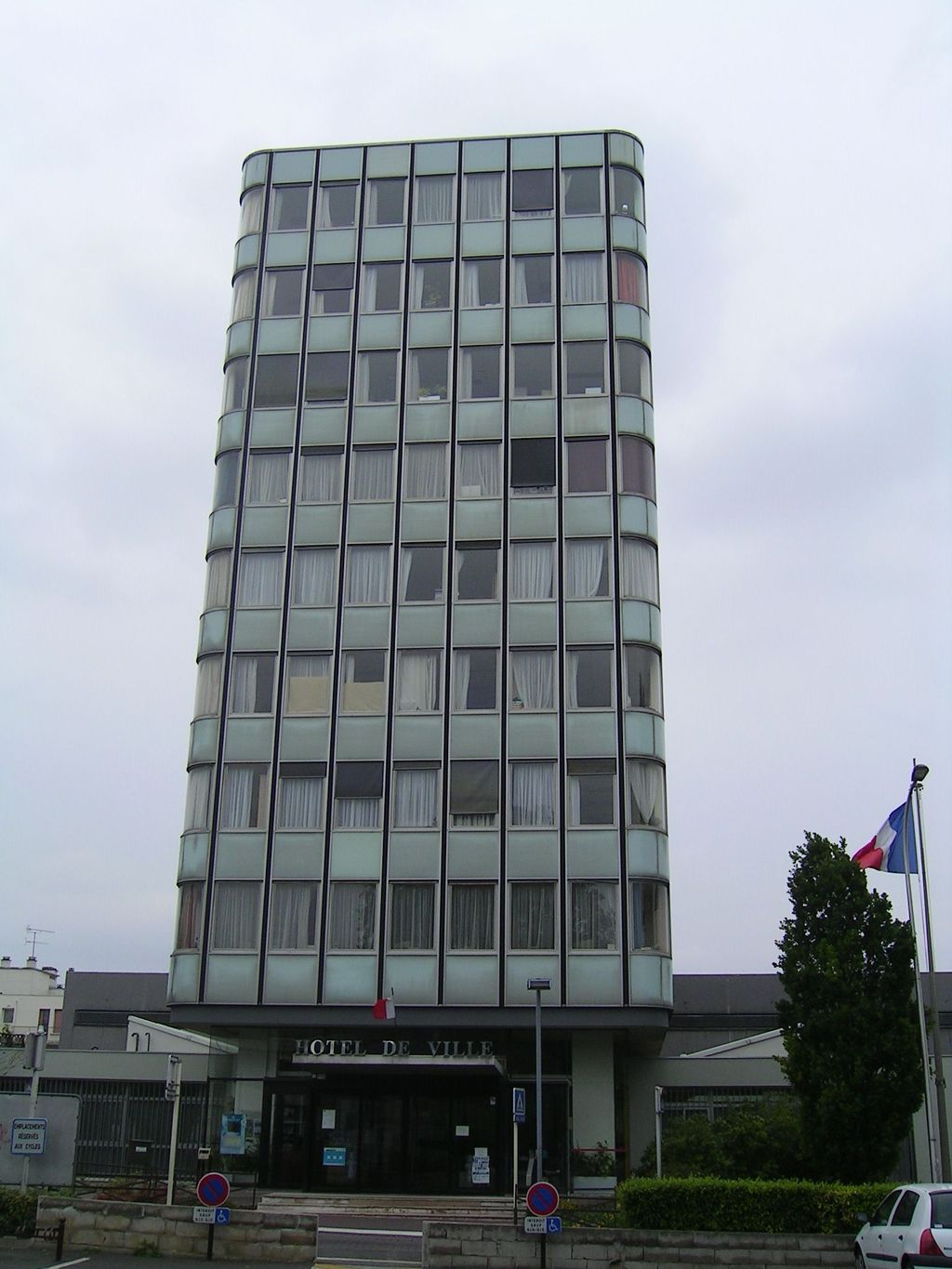
The current Hôtel de Ville

The current Hôtel de Ville was completed in 1964.

== Population ==
Historical population

Year	Pop.	±% p.a.
1793	693	—
1800	936	+4.39%
1806	780	−2.99%
1821	822	+0.35%
1831	895	+0.85%
1836	948	+1.16%
1841	1,075	+2.55%
1846	1,004	−1.36%
1851	1,014	+0.20%
1856	1,018	+0.08%
1861	2,156	+16.19%
1866	1,605	−5.73%
1872	1,684	+0.80%
1876	1,924	+3.39%
1881	1,745	−1.93%
1886	2,400	+6.58%
1891	2,603	+1.64%
1896	3,245	+4.51%
1901	4,329	+5.93%

Year	Pop.	±% p.a.
1906	5,837	+6.16%
1911	6,933	+3.50%
1921	8,061	+1.52%
1926	10,856	+6.13%
1931	14,477	+5.93%
1936	14,691	+0.29%
1946	14,270	−0.29%
1954	16,491	+1.82%
1962	21,001	+3.07%
1968	30,705	+6.54%
1975	35,784	+2.21%
1982	36,970	+0.47%
1990	37,489	+0.17%
1999	39,105	+0.47%
2007	41,283	+0.68%
2012	42,080	+0.38%
2017	46,207	+1.89%
2023	47,180	+0.35%

Source: EHESS and INSEE (1968-2023)

== Coat of arms ==
arms of Rosny-sous-Bois	The arms of Rosny-sous-Bois are blazoned: Azure, an eagle rampant argent, holding in his right talon an olive branch palewise Or.

== Transport ==
Rosny-sous-Bois is served by two stations on Paris RER E: Rosny–Bois-Perrier and Rosny-sous-Bois.

== Education ==
The commune has seven public primary school groups, with each having a preschool (maternelle) and an elementary school. There is also a private Montessori French-English bilingual primary school, Ecole maternelle privée «Les merveilles».

Secondary schools:

- Junior high schools: Albert Camus, Langevin-Wallon, Saint Exupery
- Senior high schools/sixth-form colleges: Lycée Charles de Gaulle and Lycée Professionnel Jean Moulin

== Notable people ==
- Selim Bouadla—footballer
- Mamadou Diakité—footballer
- Nicolas Douchez—footballer
- Soufiane Guerrab—actor
- Loïc Lapoussin-footballer

== See also ==
- Communes of the Seine-Saint-Denis department
