= Philippe Tillous-Borde =

French entrepreneur (1946–2022)

- Born: 17 May 1946; Versailles, France
- Died: 17 December 2022 (aged 76); Paris, France
- Education: École nationale supérieure d'horticulture; École nationale supérieure agronomique
- Occupations: Entrepreneur; engineer

Philippe Tillous-Borde (17 May 1946 – 17 December 2022) was a French entrepreneur and engineer. He was a co-founder of the group Sofiprotéol with Jean-Claude Sabin and later president of the Avril Group. From 2007 to 2010, he was a member of the Commission for the Liberation of French Growth.

== Biography ==
Tillous-Borde was an agronomic engineer by training from his studies at the École nationale supérieure d'horticulture and the École nationale supérieure agronomique. He was born into a Basque family known for rugby. After an experience with the Altiplano, he joined the Groupe d'Étude et de Recherche en BIOSystèmes, where he applied mathematical models to organic farming. In 1974, he joined the company Oleafin, a joint venture between the Louis Dreyfus Company and the Comptoir national des techniques agricoles (CNTA), as a research investment officer and director of investment and management control.

In 1983, the CNTA filed for bankruptcy. To stabilise the sector and allow for its redevelopment, Tillous-Borde and trade unionist Jean-Claude Sabin co-founded Sofiprotéol, which financed the protein and oilseed sector in France. Its main crops were rapeseed and sunflower. At the end of the 1980s, Sofiprotéol invested in biodiesel designed from rapeseed oil. The oil produced by the company was known for having the highest concentration of Omega-3 fatty acid on the market. Sofiprotéol became the highest seller of table oils in France with the purchase of Lesieur in 2002 and olive oils of Puget in 2004.

At the same time, Tillous-Borde was also involved in consolidating the table oil sector with a strategy focusing on joint products. Soybean meal was particularly rich in protein and used for animal feed. He joined Glon-Sanders, the leader in French animal feed, in 1998 and later took over the company in 2007. He also focused on glycerin and founded the company Novance in 1996. In 2009, Sofiprotéol ventured into the field of renewable chemicals with the acquisition of Belgian company Oléon. To continue the strategic development of the company internationally, he pushed the acquisitions of Romanian company Expur and a heavy stake in the Moroccan company Lesieur Cristal. He also invested heavily in oleochemicals in Malaysia.

In 2012, Sofiprotéol's turnover was 7.3 billion euros. Having reached the age limit, Tillous-Borde passed the baton to his successor, Jean-Philippe Puig at the request of Xavier Beulin. The group was renamed Avril and transformed into a partnership limited by shares.

Suffering from genetic myopia, Tillous-Borde was severely visually impaired. A member of the board of directors of the Fondation Voir et Entendre, he was entrusted with the leadership of the company Streetlab, whose mission was to improve the autonomy, mobility and quality of life of visually impaired people and seniors.

Tillous-Borde died in Paris on 17 December 2022, at the age of 76.

== Decorations ==
- Commander of the Legion of Honour (2015)
- Commander of the Ordre national du Mérite (2011)

== Publications ==
=== Testimony ===
- Un homme d'entreprise visionnaire : 40 ans au service d'une ambition agricole pour la France (2015) ISBN 978-2-212-56174-6

=== Articles ===
- "Coopératives et systèmes traditionnels de l'Altiplano péruvien" (1973)
- "Les protéines dans le monde : bilans et nouveaux enjeux" (1980)
- "Les équilibres de marchés agricoles évolutions et tendances" (2015)
- "Notre agriculture, au cœur des enjeux de la COP21" (2015)
