= Asnières-sur-Seine =

- Commune
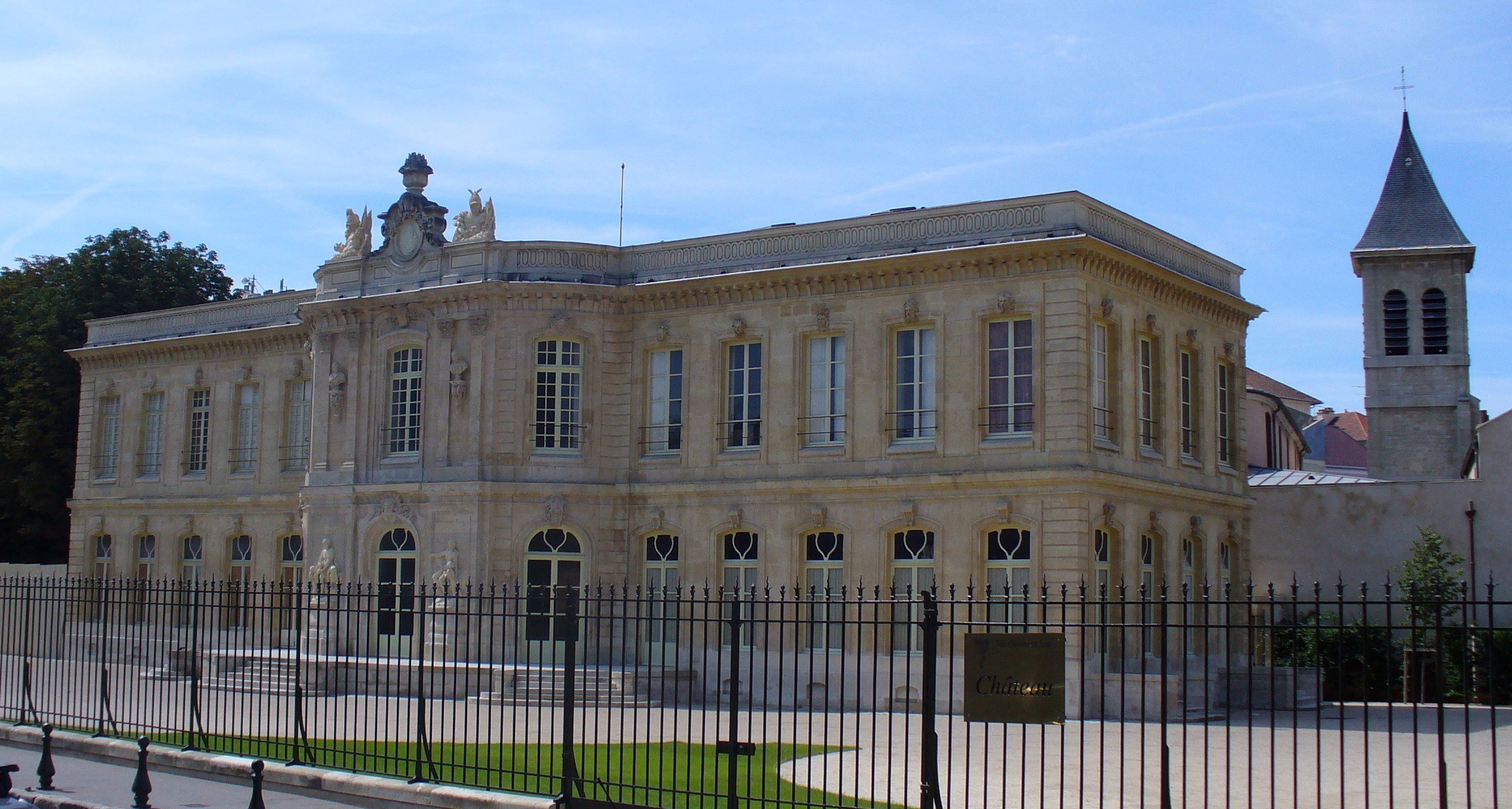
- The Château d'Asnières

- Coat of arms

- Location (in red) within Paris inner suburbs
- Location of Asnières-sur-Seine
- Location within France Location within Île-de-France (region)
- Coordinates: 48°54′39″N 2°17′20″E
- Country: France
- Region: Île-de-France
- Department: Hauts-de-Seine
- Arrondissement: Nanterre
- Canton: Asnières-sur-Seine, Courbevoie-1
- Intercommunality: Métropole du Grand Paris, ÉPT Boucle Nord de Seine

Government
  - Mayor (2026–32): Manuel Aeschlimann (LR)
- Area^{1}: 4.82 km^{2} (1.86 sq mi)
- Highest elevation: 43 m (141 ft)
- Lowest elevation: 22 m (72 ft)
- Population (2023): 93,941
  - Density: 19,500/km^{2} (50,500/sq mi)
- Demonym: Asniérois
- Time zone: UTC+01:00 (CET)
  - Summer (DST): UTC+02:00 (CEST)
- INSEE/Postal code: 92004 /92600
- Website: asnieres-sur-seine.fr
- ^{1} French Land Register data, which excludes lakes, ponds, glaciers > 1 km^{2} (0.386 sq mi or 247 acres) and river estuaries.

Asnières-sur-Seine (French pronunciation: [ɑnjɛʁ syʁ sɛn]; lit. 'Asnières-on-Seine') is a commune in the Hauts-de-Seine department in the Île-de-France region of northern France. It lies on the left bank of the river Seine, eight kilometres from the centre of Paris in the northwestern suburbs of the French capital. The area should be reached by Line 15 of the Paris Métro by 2030. The inhabitants are called the Asniérois (masculine) and Asniéroises (feminine) in French.

== Name ==
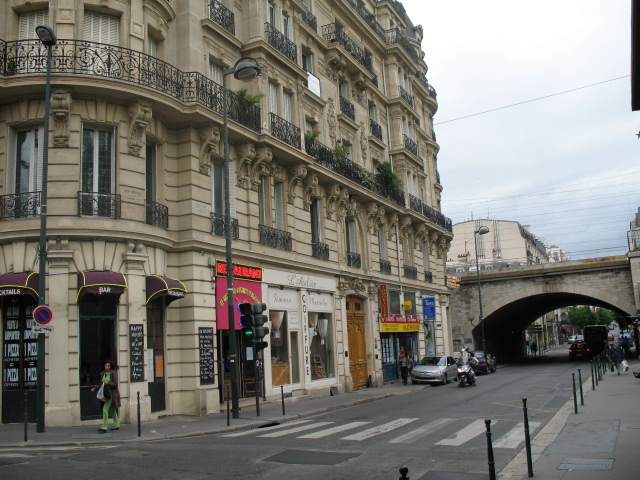
Avenue de la Marne

Asnières-sur-Seine was originally known simply as Asnières. The name was recorded for the first time in a papal bull of 1158 – as Asnerias, from Medieval Latin asinaria, meaning "donkey farm". The poor soil of Asnières, where heather grew in medieval times, was probably deemed suitable only for the breeding of donkeys. By the early 20th century it had become a favourite boating centre for Parisians, and its industries included boat building.

On 15 February 1968 the commune was officially renamed Asnières-sur-Seine to distinguish it from other French communes also called Asnières.

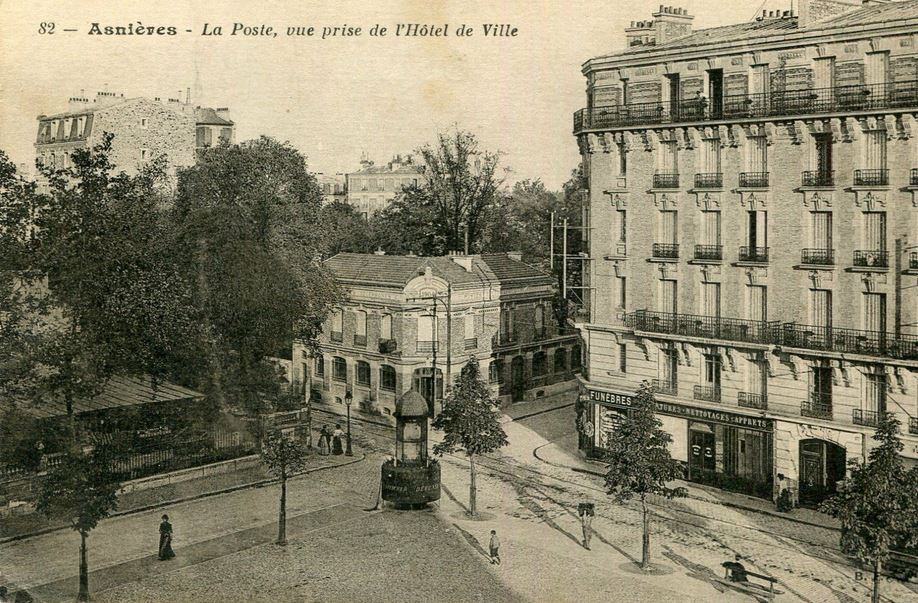
Old post office

== Demographics ==
Historical population

Year	Pop.	±% p.a.
1793	345	—
1800	334	−0.46%
1806	316	−0.92%
1821	386	+1.34%
1831	514	+2.91%
1836	556	+1.58%
1841	702	+4.77%
1846	925	+5.67%
1851	1,186	+5.10%
1856	1,822	+8.97%
1861	3,213	+12.01%
1866	5,455	+11.17%
1872	6,236	+2.26%
1876	8,278	+7.34%
1881	11,352	+6.52%
1886	15,203	+6.02%
1891	19,575	+5.19%
1896	24,317	+4.43%
1901	31,336	+5.20%

Year	Pop.	±% p.a.
1906	36,482	+3.09%
1911	42,583	+3.14%
1921	49,607	+1.54%
1926	52,609	+1.18%
1931	63,654	+3.89%
1936	71,831	+2.45%
1946	72,273	+0.06%
1954	77,838	+0.93%
1962	81,768	+0.62%
1968	80,113	−0.34%
1975	75,431	−0.86%
1982	71,077	−0.85%
1990	71,850	+0.14%
1999	75,837	+0.60%
2007	82,056	+0.99%
2012	83,845	+0.43%
2017	85,191	+0.32%
2023	93,941	+1.64%

Source: EHESS and INSEE (1968–2023)

=== Immigration ===
Place of birth of residents of Asnières-sur-Seine in 1999
Born in metropolitan France	Born outside metropolitan France			
78.3%	21.7%			
78.3%	Born in overseas France	Born in foreign countries with French citizenship at birth^{1}	EU-15 immigrants^{2}	Non-EU-15 immigrants
78.3%	1.7%	2.9%	3.5%	13.6%
^{1} This group is made up largely of former French settlers, such as pieds-noirs in Northwest Africa, followed by former colonial citizens who had French citizenship at birth (such as was often the case for the native elite in French colonies), as well as to a lesser extent foreign-born children of French expatriates. A foreign country is understood as a country not part of France in 1999, so a person born for example in 1950 in Algeria, when Algeria was an integral part of France, is nonetheless listed as a person born in a foreign country in French statistics.^{2} An immigrant is a person born in a foreign country not having French citizenship at birth. An immigrant may have acquired French citizenship since moving to France, but is still considered an immigrant in French statistics. On the other hand, persons born in France with foreign citizenship (the children of immigrants) are not listed as immigrants.

== Departmental representation ==
The commune is divided between two cantons (departmental constituencies):

- Asnières-sur-Seine: composed of part of the commune of Asnières-sur-Seine. Currently represented by Josiane Fischer (UDI) and André Mancipoz (LR).
- Courbevoie-1: composed of part of the commune of Courbevoie and of the remainder of the commune of Asnières-sur-Seine. Currently represented by Daniel Courtès (LR) and Marie-Pierre Limoge (UDI).

== Economy ==
Lesieur – a major producer of cooking and table oils and part of the Avril Group – has its headquarters in Asnières.

== Education ==
=== Public schools ===
(fully financed by the commune, department, or region):

- 20 kindergarten / nursery schools (écoles maternelles);
- 16 elementary / primary schools (écoles élémentaires);
- 4 junior high schools: the Collège André Malraux, the Collège Auguste Renoir, the Collège François Truffaut, and the Collège Voltaire;
- 3 senior high schools: the Lycée d'enseignement adapté Martin Luther King, the Lycée professionnel de Prony, and the Lycée général et technologique Auguste Renoir;
- additionally, the Institut départemental médico-éducatif Gustave Baguer specializes in the education of hearing-impaired children and young people.

=== Private schools ===
(partly financed by the commune, department, or region) include:

- The École catholique Sainte-Agnès (preschool and elementary school)
- The Institution Saint-Joseph (preschool through junior high school)
- The Institution Sainte-Geneviève (preschool through senior high school)

== Communications ==
=== Public transport ===
Asnières-sur-Seine is served by three stations on Paris Métro Line 13: Gabriel Péri, Les Agnettes, and Les Courtilles, the last named being the terminus of the line.

Line 1 of the Île-de-France tramway also serves the metro station at Les Courtilles, connecting it to Noisy-le-Sec.

Trains on Lines J (Gisors) and L (Cergy) of the Transilien Paris-Saint-Lazare suburban rail network call at Asnières-sur-Seine station, while those on Line J (Gosos) also serve Bois-Colombes station and those on Line L (Cergy) also serve Bécon-les-Bruyères station which lie just outside the western limit of the commune.

A number of bus routes – lines 140, 165, 175, 177, and 276 – run through Asnières and connect it to its neighbouring communes.

=== Roads ===
Car traffic in Asnières is difficult. Most of the traffic is on the banks of the Seine around the city. The crossing of the Asnières bridge is extremely crowded and slow during peak hours. The Grand rue Charles-de-Gaulle followed by the Avenue d'Argenteuil are also impractical as they also deserve Bois-Colombes and northern towns. Moreover, the city has very few parking spaces, and garages and private parking spaces are scarce and expensive.

Between 2010 and 2013, there was a development plan to change the one-way streets of the city to become two-way for bicycles.

== Sport ==
In addition to the Courtilles ice rink, the town has ten gyms, six stadiums, a shooting range, two tennis clubs (Azur Tennis Club and the Tennis Club du Ménil), a skate park, a Parisian boules court and a swimming pool.

The Asnières Volley 92 participates in Ligue B (2nd national level) and plays at the Courtilles gymnasium. The city also has a handball club in agreement with neighboring cities. For the 2017–2018 season, the first team evolves in Pool 2 in National 2. Finally, the city counts, with the Molosses, an American football club, created in 1992, evolving in Casque d'Or (D2), 2-time vice-champion of France of D1 (1999, and 2014).

A full-contact club, known as ABC (Asnieres Boxing Club) is also managed by a coaching team composed with ex-France and European champions. Around 100 members take part in trainings three times a Week (Monday, Wednesday and Friday). The judo and jujitsu club Arts Martiaux d'Asnières uses several of the town's gyms.

== Asnières in art ==
=== Georges Seurat ===
Asnières

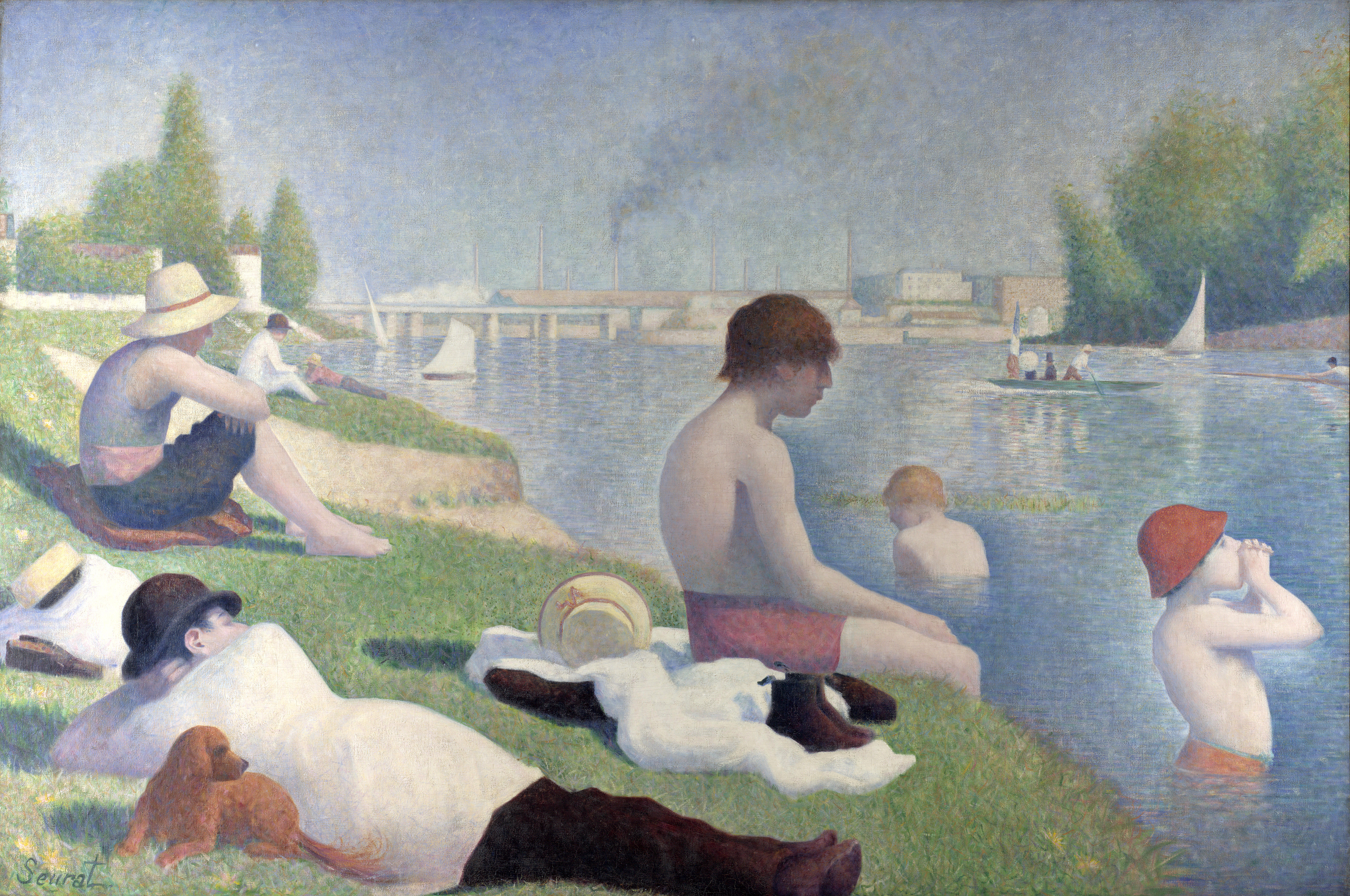
Bathers at Asnières by Georges Seurat

A Sunday Afternoon on the Island of La Grande Jatte, 1884–6, by Georges Seurat (Art Institute of Chicago)

Bathers at Asnières by Georges Seurat depicts a scene of 19th century leisure and developing industry in this suburb of Paris.

Between 1884 and 1886 Seurat painted Sunday Afternoon on the Island of La Grand Jatte, using a new technique – which came to be known as pointillism – of forming an image from patterns of tiny coloured dots.

=== Vincent van Gogh ===
Van Gogh paintings of Asnières

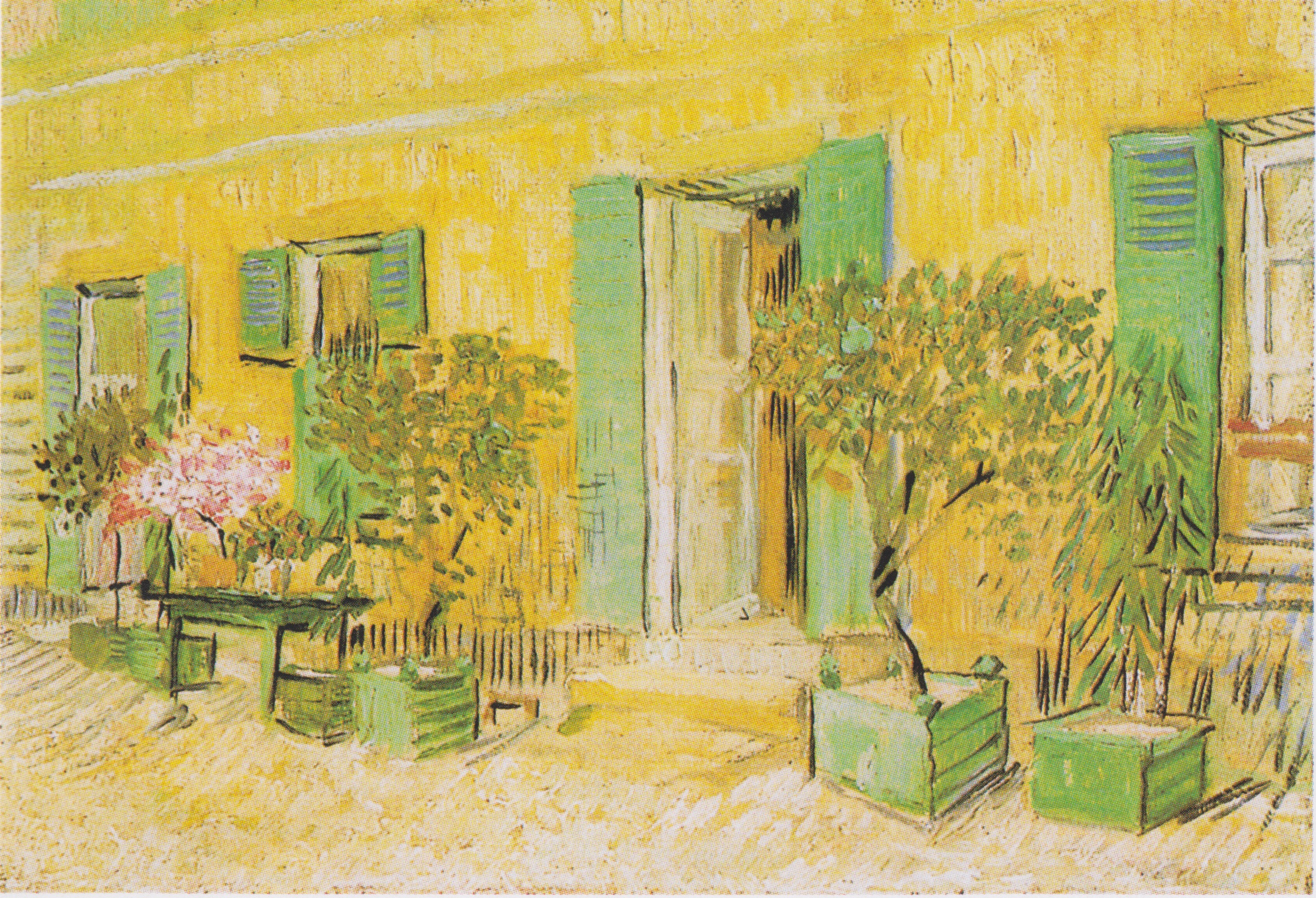
Exterior of a Restaurant at Asnières, summer 1887 (Van Gogh Museum, Amsterdam)

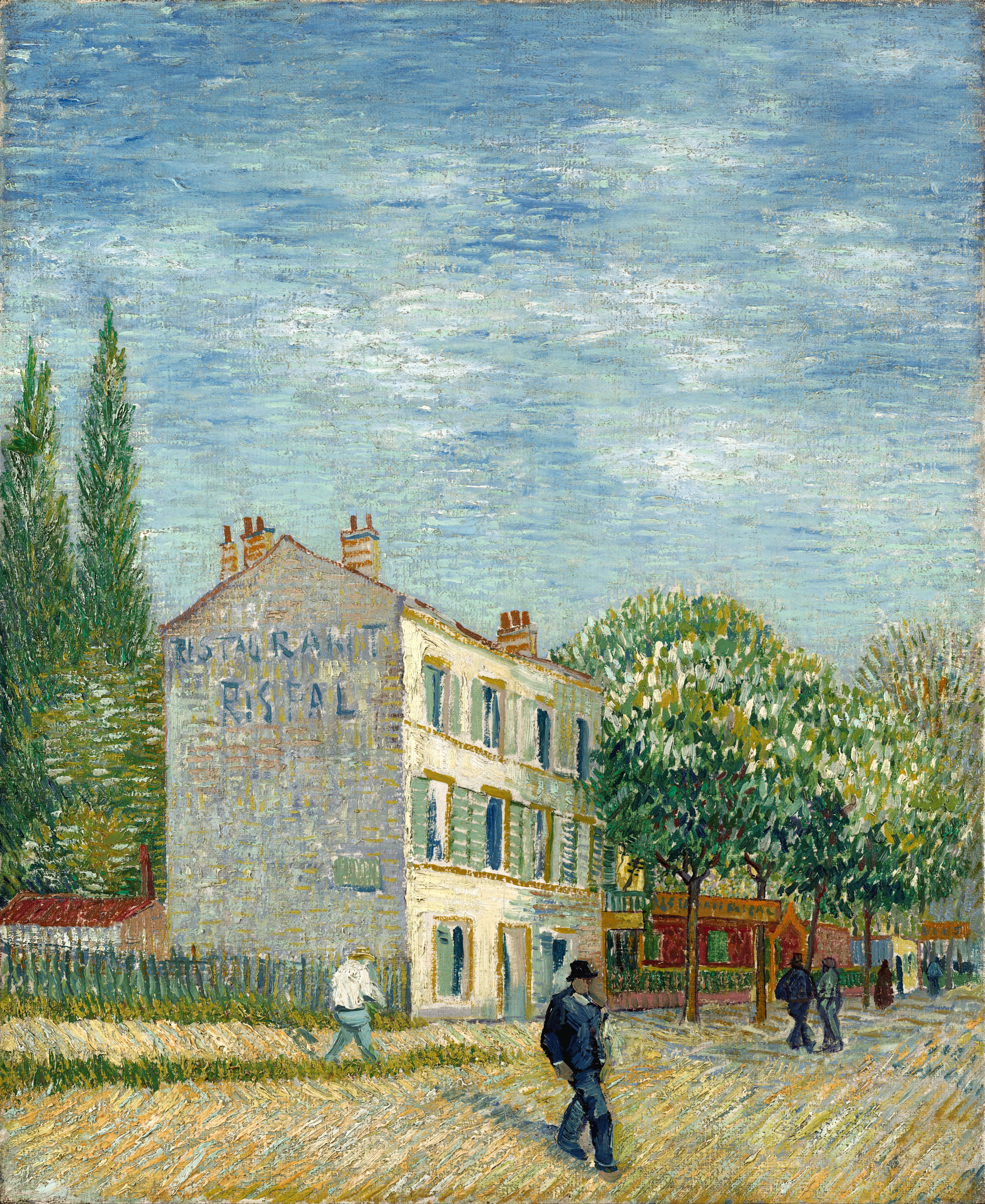
The Rispal Restaurant at Asnières, summer 1887(Nelson-Atkins Museum of Fine Art, Kansas City)

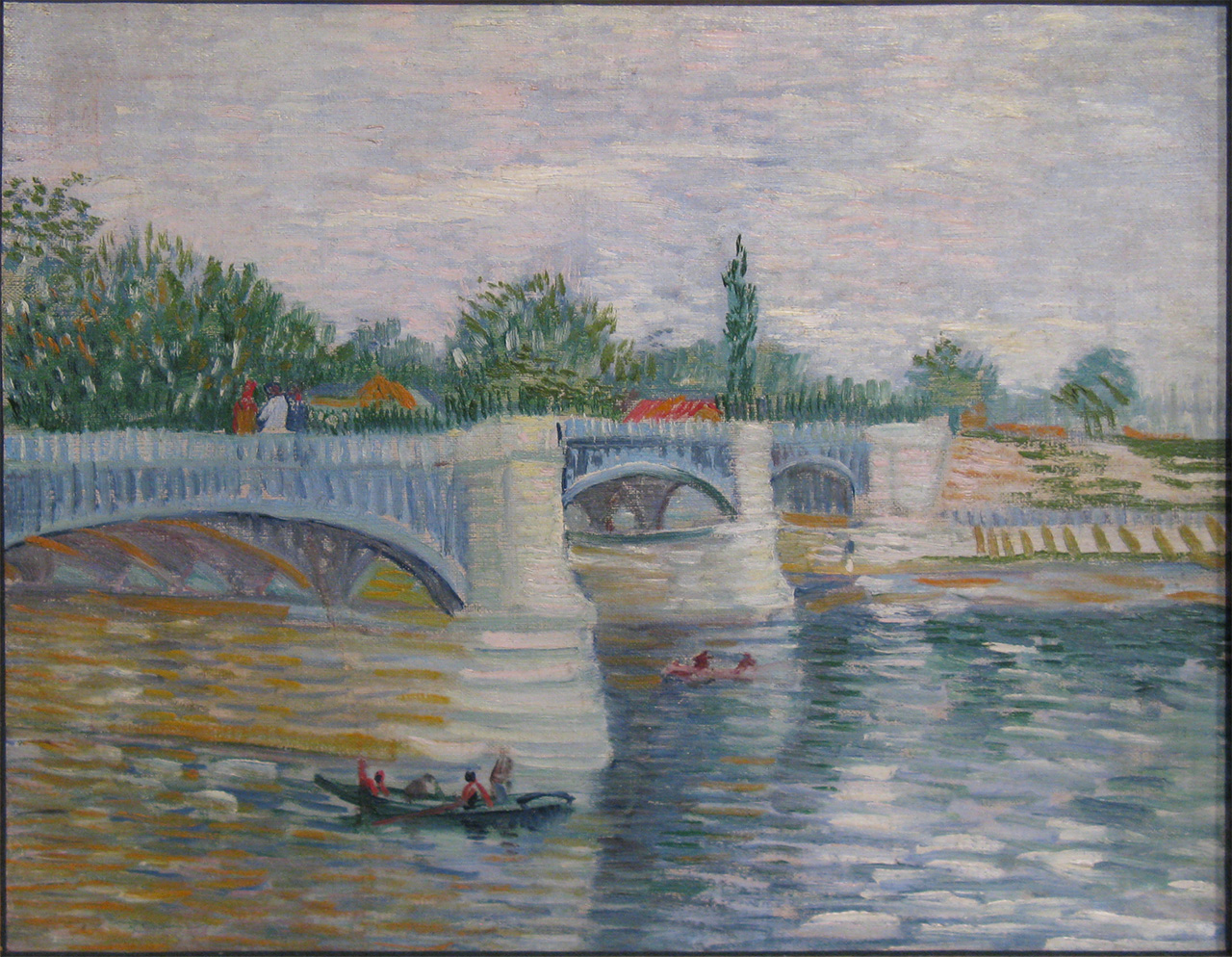
The Seine with the Pont de la Grande Jatte, summer 1887 (Van Gogh Museum, Amsterdam)

Vincent van Gogh made a series of paintings of Asnières. Influenced by impressionism and pointillism, he modified his traditional style and used vivid colour, shorter brushstrokes, and perspective to engage the viewer. His views of the banks of the Seine represent an important progression towards his later landscape paintings. In Asnières, within walking distance of his brother Theo's flat in Montmartre, van Gogh painted parks, cafés, restaurants, and the river.

== Local landmarks ==
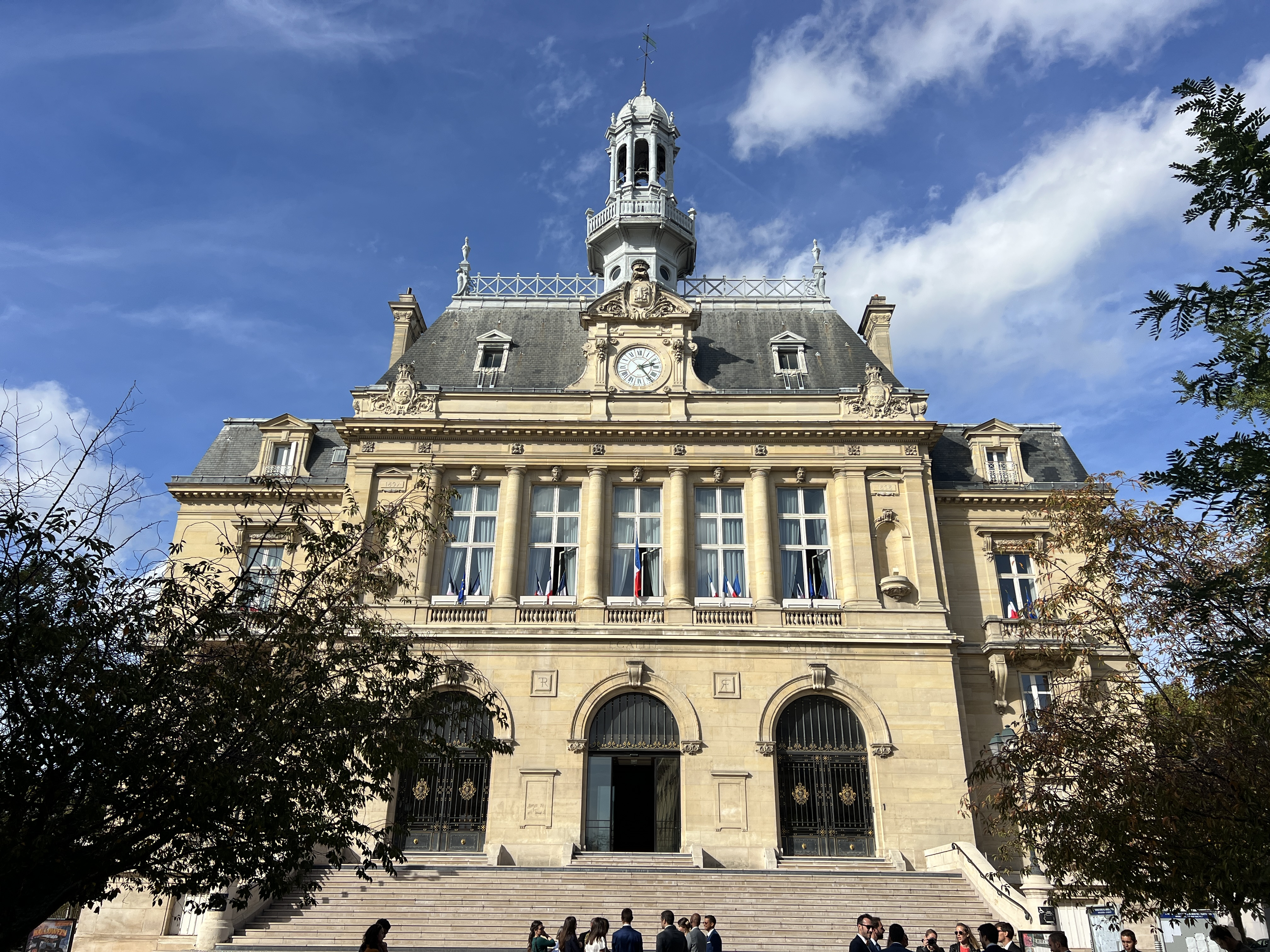
The Hôtel de Ville

- The Château d'Asnières is a stately home dating from the mid-18th century.
- The Cimetière des Chiens et Autres Animaux Domestiques in Asnières, dating from 1899, is believed to be Europe's oldest public pet cemetery (or "zoological necropolis").
- The Hôtel de Ville was completed in 1899.
- Gare Lisch, an antique train station, is in Asnières-sur-Seine.

== Twin towns – sister cities ==
Asnières-sur-Seine is twinned with:

- Spandau (Berlin), Germany
- Stockton-on-Tees, England, United Kingdom

== Notable people ==
- Manuel Aeschlimann (born 1964), National Assembly deputy and Mayor of Asnières
- Henri Barbusse (1873–1935), politician and writer, a street in the town was named after him
- Carlotta Brianza (1865-1938), Ballerina, she danced Aurora in the premiere of Marius Petipa's The Sleeping Beauty (ballet).
- Maurice Hewitt (1884–1971), violinist
- William Gallas (born 1977), footballer
- Frédéric Gorny (born 1973), actor
- Ginette Keller (1925–2010), composer
- Axel Ngando (born 1993), footballer
- Barbara Pravi (born 1993), singer
- Gaston Rivierre (1862–1942), cyclist
- Vincent van Gogh (1853–1890), painter

The old château was the death place of Anne Marie Victoire de Bourbon (1675–1700), daughter of Henri Jules de Bourbon and thus grand daughter of le Grand Condé, cousin to Louis XIV.

The Franco-Irish composer and pianist George O'Kelly died here in 1914.

Louis Vuitton opened his first workshop and resided here until his death. The workshop still stands today and some emblematic pieces are still made there (rigid trunks, leather models).

The Hutu Rwandan businessman and suspected war criminal Félicien Kabuga was arrested here on 16 May 2020 after 26 years as a fugitive for crimes against humanity committed during the Rwandan genocide. Specifically, he is accused of funding the genocide as well as buying thousands of machetes and importing them into Rwanda for use as weapons to kill Tutsis during the genocide.

== See also ==
- Communes of the Hauts-de-Seine department
