= Christiane Lambert =

French agricultural activist (born 1961)

- Foulier
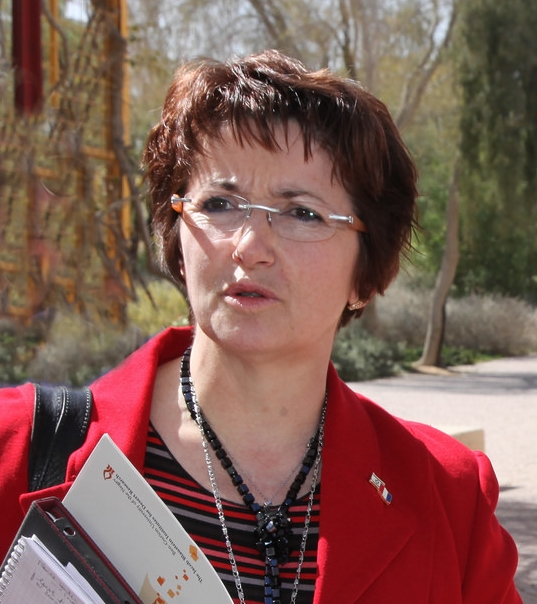
- Lambert in 2012
- Born: 25 June 1961 (age 64); Saint-Flour, Puy-de-Dôme, France
- Occupations: Farmer, agricultural trade unionist
- Organization(s): FNSEA, COPA-COGECA
- Spouse: Thierry Lambert
- Awards: Women of Political Influence Price awarded by the club Génération femmes d'influence (2017)
- Honours: Legion of Honour (2021)

Christiane Lambert (née Foulier; born 25 June 1961) is a French farmer and agricultural trade unionist who has headed the Fédération Nationale des Syndicats d'Exploitants Agricoles since 2017. In 2020, she became the president of the Comité des Organisations Professionnelles Agricoles - Comité Général de la Coopération Agricole de l'Union Européenne.

== Early life ==
Born in Saint-Flour (Cantal) in 1961, Christiane Lambert is the daughter of Guy Foulier and Marie Berthuy, farmers and activists in the Jeunesse Catholique Agricole.

At the age of 19, she obtained the Brevet de Technicien Supérieur techniques agricole from the Saint-Dominique Institute in Puy-en-Velay. She set up her dairy farm of 25 hectares and 40 pigs in Massiac.

She was a former handball champion.

In 1985, she lost her father in a work accident. A year later, on 16 August 1986, she married Thierry Lambert with whom she had three children.

In 1989, she took over with her husband the mixed farm of her parents-in-law's, based on pig breeding in Bouillé-Ménard, in Maine-et-Loire. It is a Collective Farming Grouping including 106 hectares of crops (maize, wheat, barley, peas and rape) for a 230 sows farrow-to-finish pig farm.

== Union activities ==
=== Early activities ===
At the age of 20, Christiane Lambert started her union activities by becoming the chairwoman of the Cantonal Centre of Young Farmers in Massiac. She remained in this position until 1984.

From 1982 to 1988, she was vice-president of the Departmental Centre of Young Farmers of Cantal and first chairperson of the Regional Centre of Young Farmers of Auvergne in 1986.

In 1994, she became the first chairwoman of the National Centre of Young Farmers until 1998.

In 1999, she was elected to head the Forum des Agriculteurs Responsables Respecteux de l'Environnement (Forum of Responsible and Environmentally Friendly Farmers) and VIVEA (a continuing education funds for farmers). She left the FARRE and VIVEA in 2005.

She was also president of the Departmental Federation of Farmers' Unions from 2001 to 2011.

In 2010, she became the deputy chairwoman of the Fédération Nationale des Syndicats d'Exploitants.

=== Presidency of the FNSEA ===
Following the death of Xavier Beulin in 2017, she was acting president of the FNSEA and was elected first chairwoman on 29 March 2017 at the Brest Congress. Her presidency became official on 13 April 2017 during the board meeting. After being officially elected and adopting a reformist vision, Christiane Lambert highlighted the teamwork and orientations led by Xavier Beulin to defend agriculture.

In France, she protected farming by involving civil society and putting forward: "organic farming, animal welfare, producer organisations, fair prices for producers within the framework of the Spain 2 law". While in the European Union, she fought for reducing the gaps of competitiveness between Member States by requesting the implementation of a compulsory minimum wage in each Member States.

=== Militant actions ===
Christiane Lambert advanced and protected the farming profession by guarantying them fair incomes. It was done through the Etats Généraux de l'Alimentation (General States of Food), set up by Emmanuel Macron to offer "fair pays to farmers and quality food to the population".

On 14 November 2017, they established the commitment charter where farmers, processing and distribution representatives must commit to offering better food products, transparency in their relations, taking into account the production costs of agricultural products. It was signed in presence of the French Minister of Agriculture Stéphane Travert and the Secretary to the French Minister of the Economy, Benjamin Griveaux".

To complete the agreement and in line with the FARRE, Christiane Lambert put in the place the "solutions contract for a green and digital agriculture" by removing pesticides and using crop protection technologies to fight against climate change.

At the end of the International Planet A Forum held on 29 June 2018 in Châlons-en-Champagne, Christiane Lambert and Pascal Canfin, General Director of WWF France (World Wide Fund for Nature) joined forces to further sustainable agriculture.

Their aim is the "artificialisation of land, the development of methanisation, the fair distribution of value between all the stakeholders in the agri-food chain and the protection of farmers against other agricultures".

In 2018, she launched the Agridemain movement which aims to "change the image of agriculture among the general public".

On 18 September 2020, Lambert became the president of the Comité des Organisations Professionnelles Agricoles - Comité Général de la Coopération Agricole de l'Union Européenne. She manages the presidency of COPA-COGECA as well as the FNSEA.

As president of COPA-COGECA and FNSEA, she defends the reform of a greener Common Agricultural Policy where farmers who fight against climate change can have access to direct aids: agroecology, agronomy, animal welfare etc. These aids help farmers to invest in material and equipment (e.g. fertilisers) and be formed to new practices.

== Honors ==
On 29 November 2017, Christiane Lambert received the "2017 Women of Political Influence Price awarded by the club Génération femmes d'influence (Influence Generation Women Club) who promotes female entrepreneurship and she dedicated it to all women farmers".

On 1 January 2021, she received the Legion of Honor.
