= Kwati (soup) =

Nepali bean soup

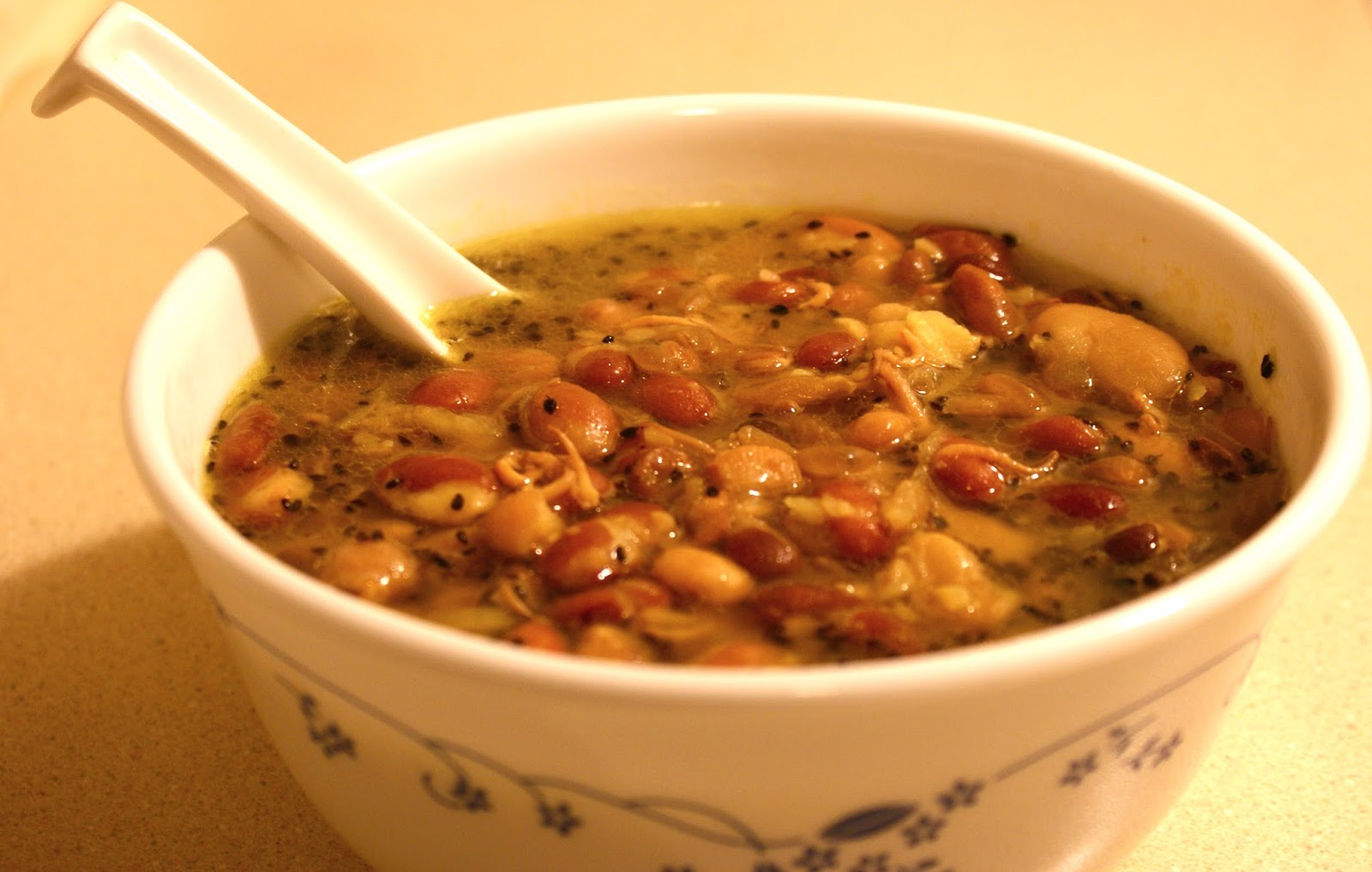
- A bowl of kwati
- Alternative names: Gedagudi, Kwanti
- Course: mixed soup
- Main ingredients: black gram, green gram, chickpea, field bean, soybean, field pea, garden pea, cowpea and rice bean

Kwātī (Newar: क्वाती (where क्वा (kwā) = 'hot' and ती (tī) = 'soup'); Nepali: क्वाँटी) is a mixed soup of nine types of sprouted beans. It is a traditional Newari dish consumed on the festival of Guni Punhi, the full moon day of Gunlā which is the tenth month in the Nepal Era lunar calendar.

== Consumption ==
Kwāti is eaten as a delicacy and for its health benefits and ritual significance. Kwati is considered to be a healthy food. Because the soup contains varieties of beans, this recipe is high in proteins.

The feast day coincides with Shravan Poornima of the month of Shravan in the Hindu lunisolar calendar which is celebrated as Janāi Purnimā (Raksha Bandhan), the festival of the sacred thread. The festival occurs in August.

== Production ==
Nine varieties of beans are used to make kwāti. The most commonly used ingredients are black gram, green gram, chickpea, field bean, soybean, field pea, garden pea, cowpea and rice bean.

The beans are soaked in water for three to four days until they have sprouted. They are boiled with various spices to make a thick soup. Ajwain seeds are tempered in oil and added to it as the special seasoning. Flatbread cut into one-and-a-half-inch squares can be boiled with the kwāti for variety.

== Gallery ==
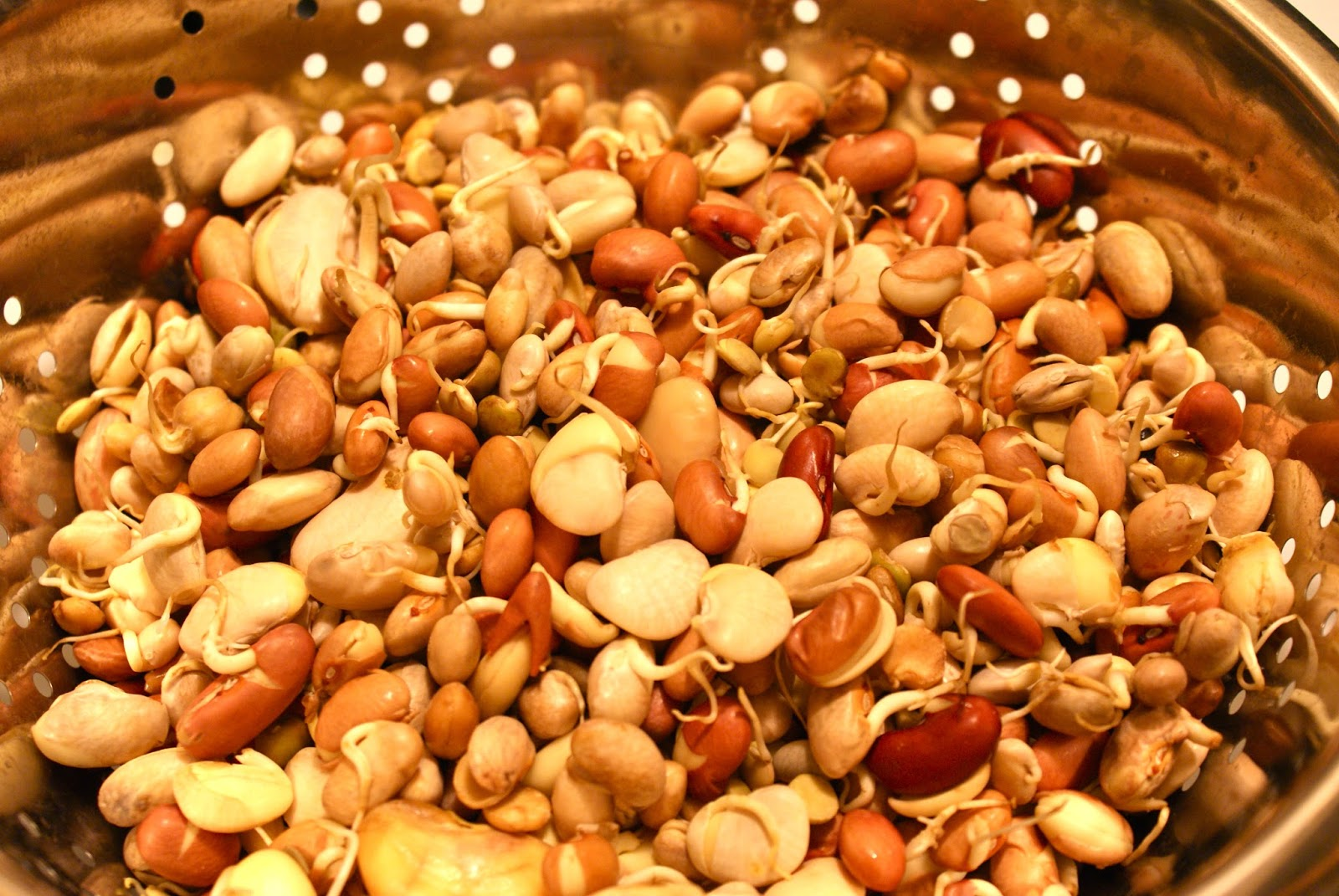
Ingredients of Kwati

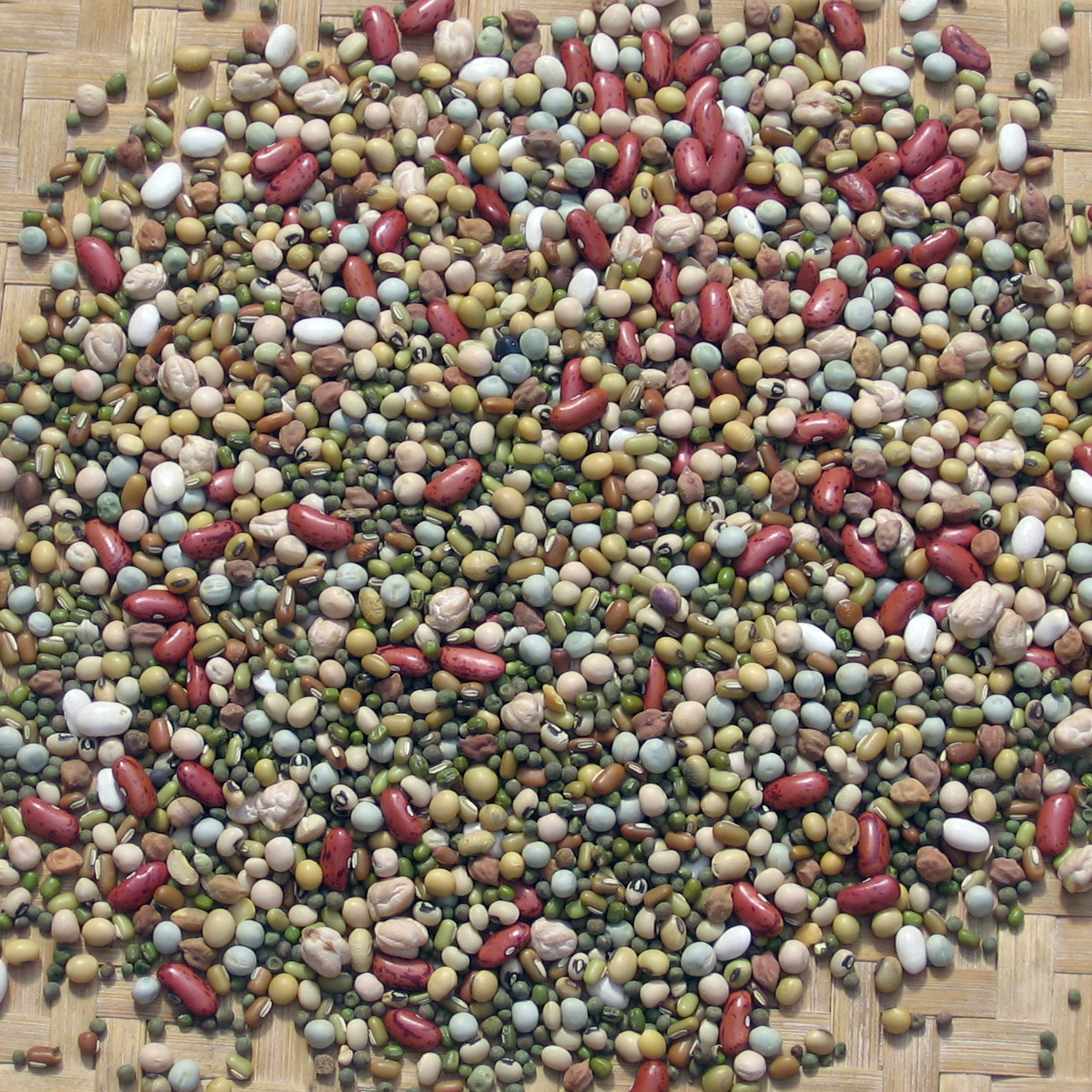
Nine types of beans and legumes used in kwati

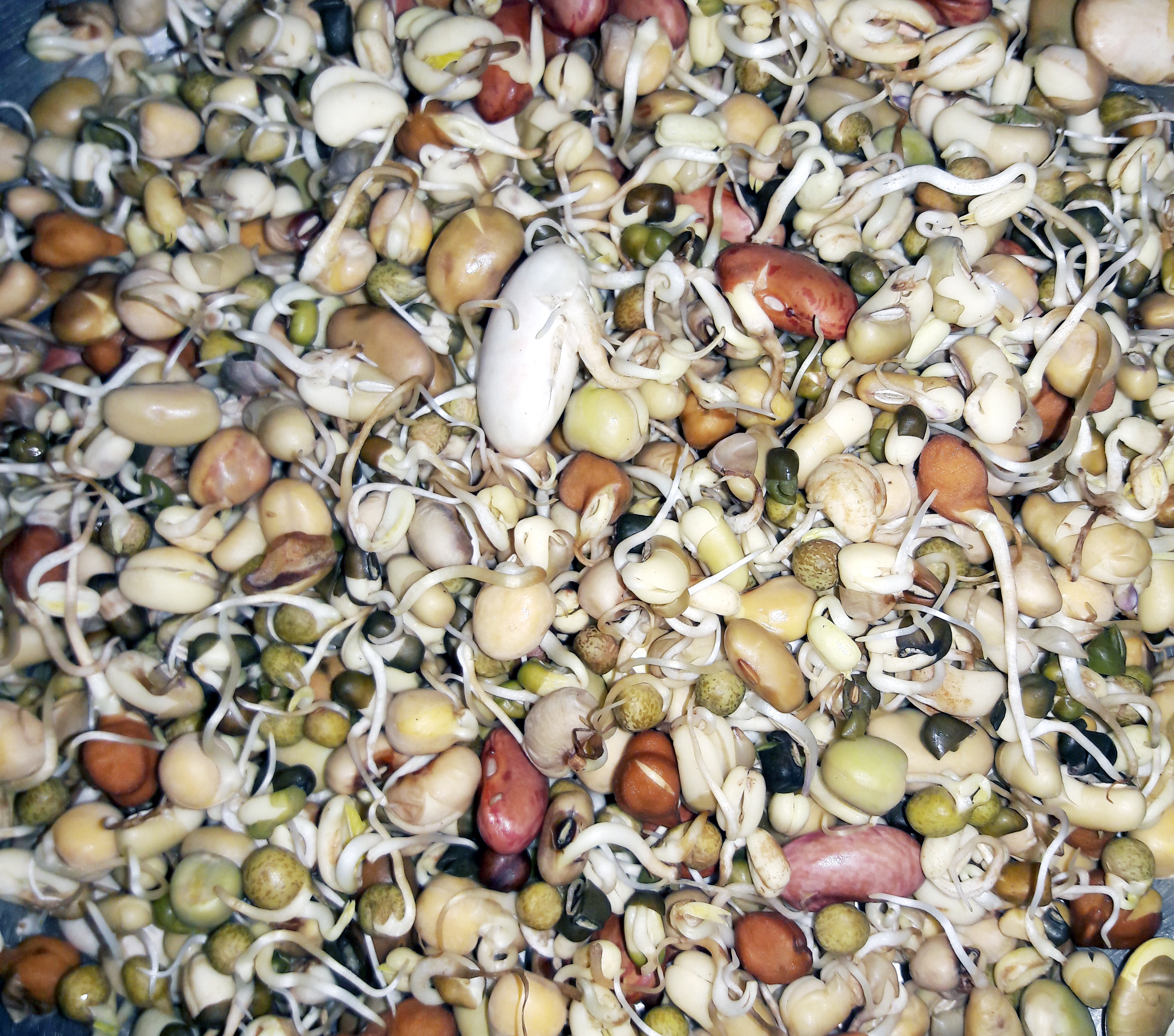
Kwati sprouts

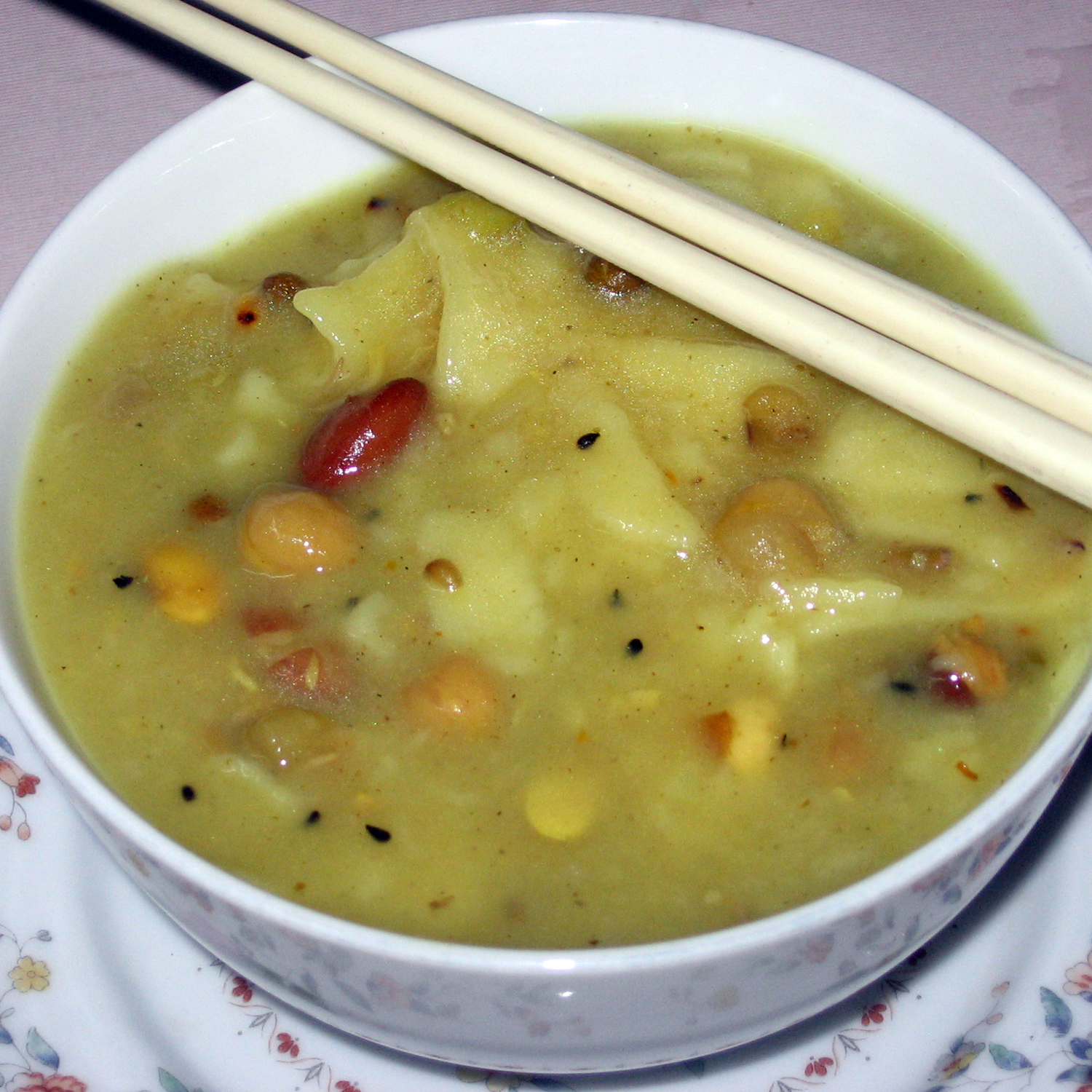
Kwati soup

== See also ==
- List of Nepalese dishes
- List of bean soups
- List of soups
