= Charter for the Environment =

Constitutional law in France

The Charter for the Environment (French: Charte de l'environnement) is a constitutional law of France approved in 2005, forming part of the constitutional block (bloc de constitutionnalité) of French law having the same force as the Constitution.

The Charter recognizes some fundamental rights and duties relating to the protection of the environment and introduces three major principles into the Constitution of France: the principle of prevention (in Art. 3), the precautionary principle, and the polluter pays principle.

The charter project was initiated by the President of the French Republic Jacques Chirac and prepared by a Commission headed by Yves Coppens, professor of anthropology at the Collège de France.

In changing the Constitution, the Charter is one of the Constitutional amendments under the French Fifth Republic.

== Origins ==
Jacques Chirac announced the Charter for the Environment project on 3 May 2001, in a speech in Orléans. He was nearing the end of his first seven-year term as President, and the Charter became one of his policy promises in his campaign at the 2002 French presidential election. Chirac was re-elected, with some 80 per cent of the votes in the second round, beating Jean-Marie Le Pen.

Chirac then appointed a special commission, chaired by Professor Yves Coppens, which took some two years to draft the text of the charter. This commission also included:

- Dominique Bourg of the University of Technology of Troyes;
- Christian Brodhag, director of research at the École des Mines de Saint-Étienne;
- Philippe Charrier;
- Bertrand P. Collomb, chairman of Lafarge;
- François Ewald, philosopher and jurist;
- Yves Jegouzo, State Councillor;
- Robert Klapisch, engineer and physicist;
- Christiane Lambert of the Forum des Agriculteurs Responsables Respecteux de l'Environnement;
- Jean-Claude Lefeuvre, professor at the National Museum of Natural History;
- François Loloum, Master of Requests of the Council of State;
- Marie-José Nicoli, President of UFC-Que Choisir;
- Jacques Pélissard, president of the Association of Mayors of France;
- Geneviève Perrin-Gaillard, Deputy for Deux-Sèvres;
- Pierre Picard, University of Paris X;
- Charles Pilet, veterinarian;
- Bernard Rousseau, President of France Nature Environnement; and
- Jean-François Trogrlic, national secretary of the French Democratic Confederation of Labour.

This Commission appointed two committees, one legal, the other scientific, to test some hypotheses it wished to consider. Public opinion was also gathered in a series of public meetings held throughout France.

The Commission submitted its report in April 2003, with a proposed text of the charter, which was later reworked by the General Secretariat of the Government and by the cabinet of the President of the Republic. As well as the charter itself, in its final form it includes a change to the preamble of the Constitution of France, inserting into it the ten elements of the Charter, and also to Article 34 of the Constitution.

The draft charter was presented as a constitutional bill to the National Assembly and then to the Senate and was approved in 2004. On 28 February 2005, Parliament met in Congress at Versailles and ratified the charter by 531 votes to 23. Jacques Chirac promulgated it on 1 March 2005.

== Articles of the Charter ==
- Article 1. Everyone has the right to live in a balanced environment which shows due respect for health.
- Article 2. Everyone is under a duty to participate in preserving and enhancing the environment.
- Article 3. Everyone shall, in the conditions provided for by law, foresee and avoid the occurrence of any damage which he or she may cause to the environment or, failing that, limit the consequences of such damage.
- Article 4. Everyone shall be required, in the conditions provided for by law, to contribute to the making good of any damage he or she may have caused to the environment.
- Article 5. When the occurrence of any damage, albeit unpredictable in the current state of scientific knowledge, may seriously and irreversibly harm the environment, public authorities shall, with due respect for the principle of precaution and the areas within their jurisdiction, ensure the implementation of procedures for risk assessment and the adoption of temporary measures commensurate with the risk involved in order to preclude the occurrence of such damage.
- Article 6. Public policies shall promote sustainable development. To this end they shall reconcile the protection and enhancement of the environment with economic development and social progress.
- Article 7. Everyone has the right, in the conditions and to the extent provided for by law, to have access to information pertaining to the environment in the possession of public bodies and to participate in the public decision-taking process likely to affect the environment.
- Article 8. Education and training with regard to the environment shall contribute to the exercising of the rights and duties set out in this Charter.
- Article 9. Research and innovation shall contribute to the preservation and development of the environment.
- Article 10. This Charter shall inspire France's actions at both European and international levels.

== The Impact of the Charter on the French Legal System ==
=== The Constitutional Council ===
The Constitutional Council invoked the "Charter for the Environment" for the first time in Decision No. 2005-514 DC of April 28, 2005, concerning the establishment of the "International Register of French Ships". In another decision dated June 19, 2008, regarding the law on genetically modified organisms (GMOs), the Constitutional Council, acting on the basis of the Charter for the Environment and Article 34 of the Constitution (which defines the scope of legislative authority)—struck down certain statutory provisions; nevertheless, the Council reaffirmed that "all rights and duties defined in the Charter for the Environment possess constitutional status"
