= Desmet (technologies company) =

Plant engineering and equipment company

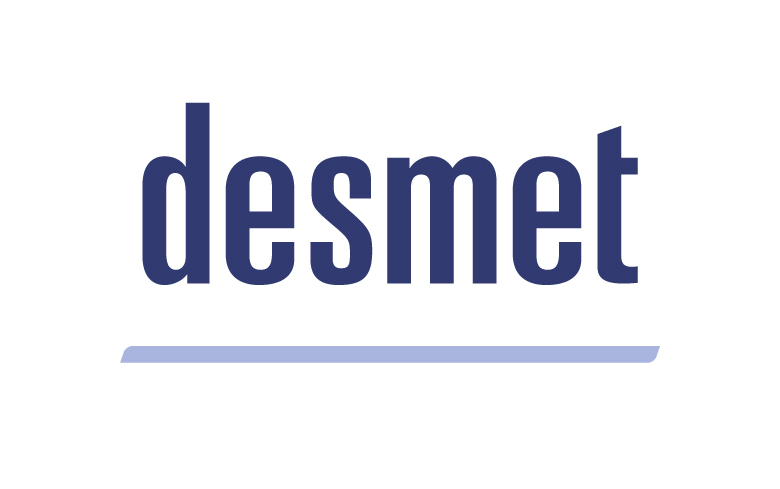
- Company type: Part of public company Alfa Laval Group
- Industry: Engineering, food technologies
- Founded: 1946
- Founder: Jean-Albert De Smet
- Headquarters: Diegem, Belgium
- Number of locations: 16
- Area served: Worldwide
- Operating income: $450 million
- Number of employees: 1200
- Website: www.desmet.com

Desmet is a multinational corporation founded in 1946 that provides custom-engineered plants and equipment which transform oilseeds, grains and tropical oils into protein feed/food, edible oils/fats, oleochemicals and biofuel.

Desmet owns 3 brands: Desmet, oilseed and biofuel technologies, RoseDowns, oilseed and rendering presses, and Stolz, grain handling and feed and food milling machinery.

== History ==
Desmet was founded in 1946 by engineer Jean-Albert De Smet, Who was at that time the director at the Antwerp Oil Mill and decided to start his own engineering company for the commercialization of his invention. Extraction De Smet was founded, and the offices were located in Edegem (near Antwerp) in Belgium.

Extraction De Smet expanded its portfolio of technologies for oils & fats processing: preparation and extraction (1946), oil refining (1963), grain handling and feed milling (1975 – co-operation with Stolz), fat modification (1983). Also during this period, there was an international expansion with the opening of engineering offices in Spain (1966), Mexico (1969), Argentina (1969), Brazil (1970), Malaysia (1978), US (1979), Singapore (1980) and India (1984).

In 1988, RoseDowns, a UK company founded in 1777, specialized in design and manufacturing of continuous oilseed presses, became part of "Desmet". Rosedowns is still located in Kingston upon Hull.

In December 2004, De Smet Technologies and Services and the Italian technology provider Ballestra, which specialized in technologies for detergents, surfactants, and chemicals, decided to merge the operations to work with the biodiesel market. Desmet Ballestra, the new name of the company, installed more than 120 ‘first generation’ biodiesel plants all over the world.

The company opened offices in Indonesia (2011), Morocco (2015) and Vietnam (2019). In 2020, the group acquired German company Serptec, a specialist in presses for rendering.

In the meantime, in 2012, Desmet Ballestra started the development of technologies for HVO and SAF pre-treatment plants, a second-generation biofuel for road and air transport.

However, in 2022, the private equity funds that were owners of Desmet Ballestra decided to sell the company in two parts. The company Desmet was created, which includes the activities of Desmet, RoseDowns and Stolz; while Ballestra operates as a fully separated entity.

Desmet is operating as an independent business unit of the "Food & Water Division" of the Alfa Laval Group, which owns 100% of the shares of Desmet. Also, the company is the owner of 70 patents and has 3 innovation centers located in Belgium, France, and Malaysia.
