= Hôtel de Ville, Asnières-sur-Seine =

Town hall in Asnières-sur-Seine, France

Hôtel de Ville
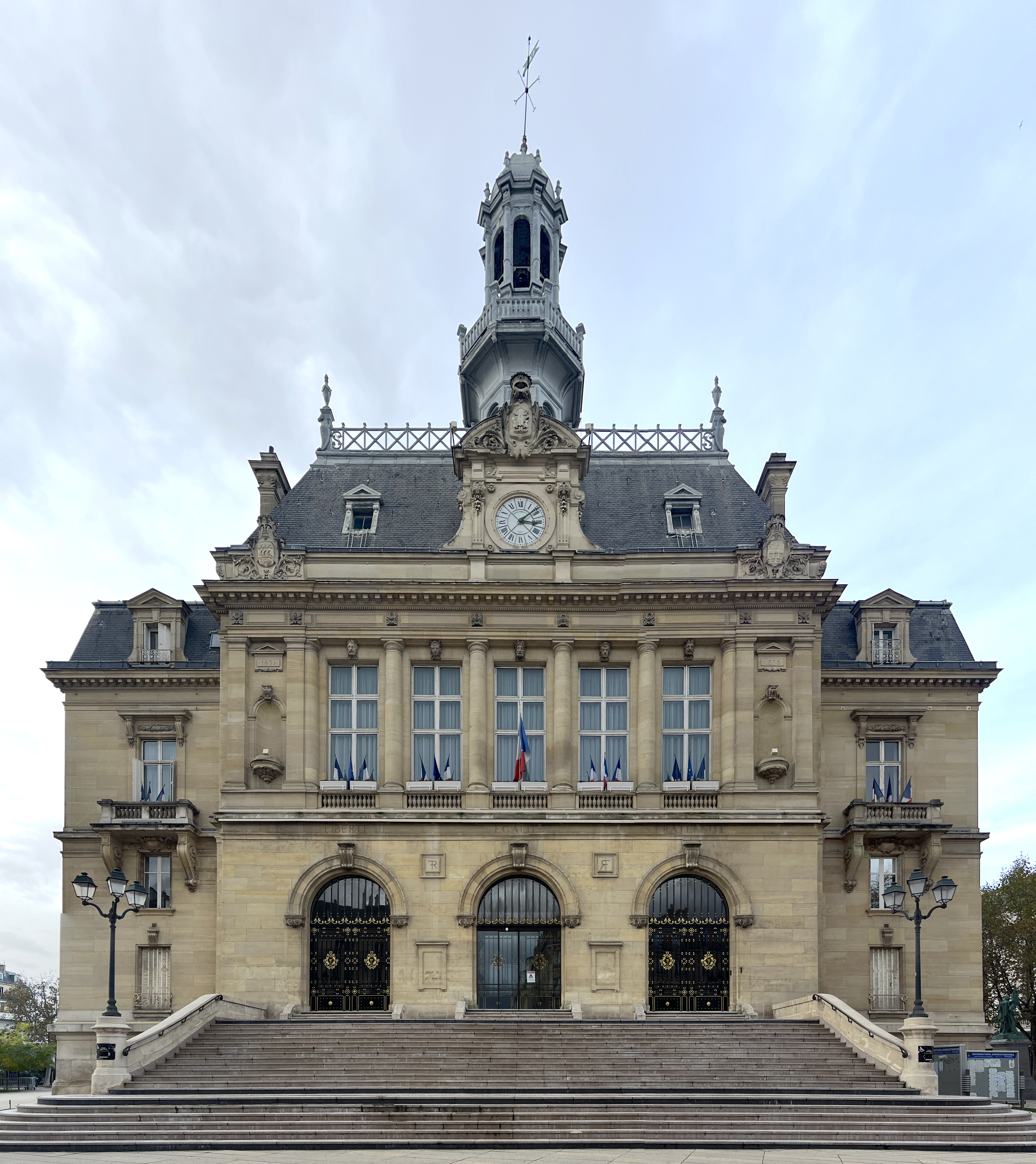
- The main frontage of the Hôtel de Ville in November 1923
- Interactive map of the Hôtel de Ville area

General information
- Type: City hall
- Architectural style: Neoclassical style
- Location: Asnières-sur-Seine, France
- Coordinates: 48.9107°N 2.2889°E
- Completed: 1899

Design and construction
- Architect: Emmanuel Garnier

The Hôtel de Ville (French pronunciation: [otɛl də vil], City Hall) is a municipal building in Asnières-sur-Seine, Hauts-de-Seine, in the northwest suburbs of Paris, France, standing on Place l'Hôtel de Ville. It has been included on the Inventaire général des monuments by the French Ministry of Culture since 1995.

== History ==
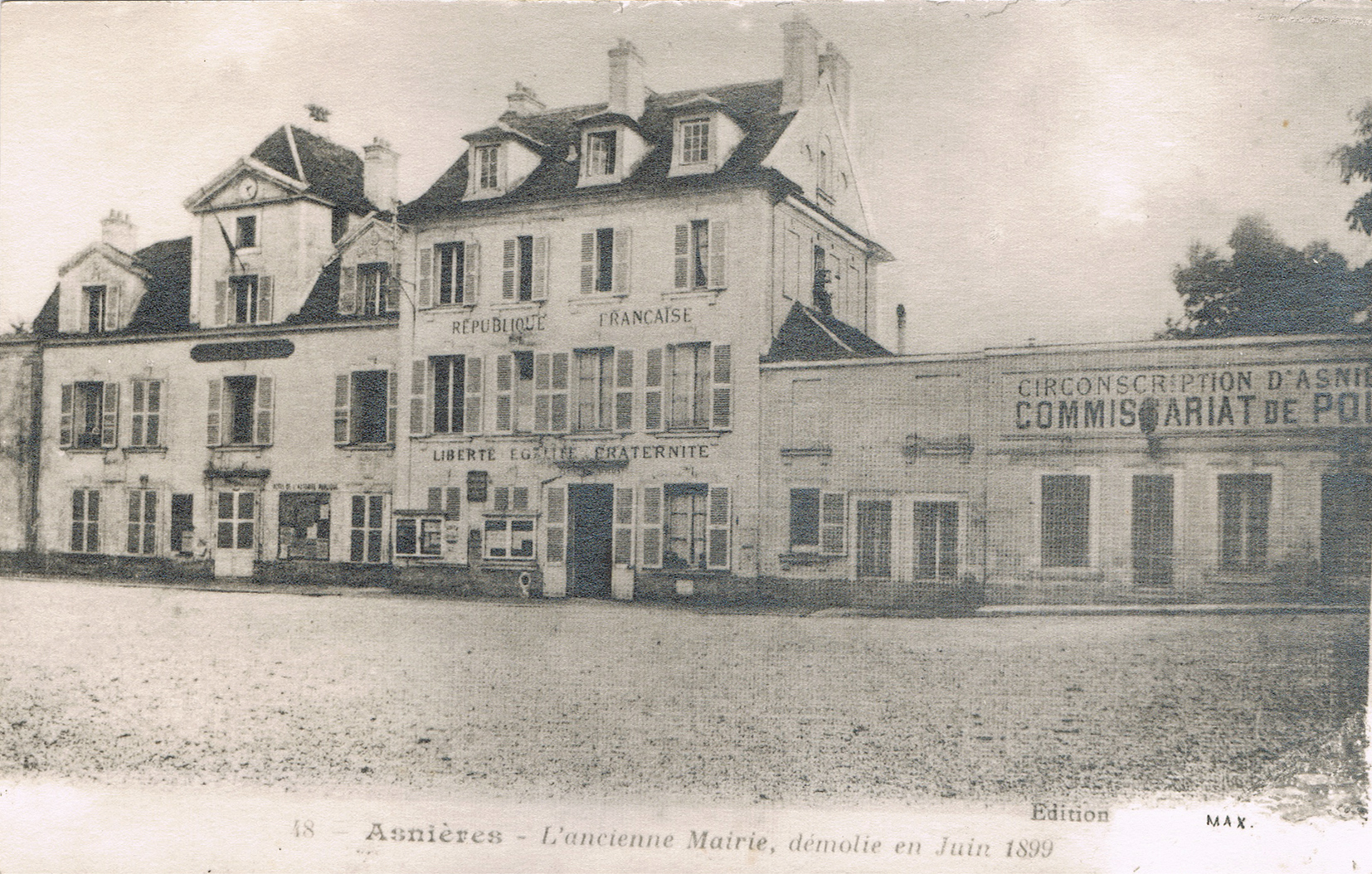
The town hall of 1849

After the French Revolution, the town council initially met at the private houses of successive mayors. The first dedicated meeting place of the town council was a former clergy house at No. 13 Rue de l'Église, which the council acquired in 1822. The town council then relocated to a former community school at No. 10 Rue de l'Église in November 1849.

In the early 1870s, the town council decided to commission a more substantial town hall. The site it selected was occupied by an 18th-century mansion with extensive gardens belonging to the Vanin de Courville family. The council acquired the site in 1875 and initiated the demolition of the mansion. The foundation stone for the new building was laid by the prefect, Justin de Selves, on 10 October 1897. The new building was designed by Emmanuel Garnier in the neoclassical style, built by a contractor, Eugène Lambert, in ashlar stone and was officially opened by the mayor, Hector-Gonsalphe Fontaine, on 15 October 1899.

The design involved a symmetrical main frontage of nine bays facing onto Place l'Hôtel de Ville. The central section of seven bays, which was slightly projected forward, featured a flight of steps leading up to three rounded headed openings with moulded surrounds and keystones. There were five tall casement windows on the first floor and niches in the bays beyond. The windows were flanked by Doric order columns and the niches were flanked by Doric order pilasters supporting a frieze, a modillioned cornice and a parapet. The outer bays were fenestrated by pairs of casement windows, one above the other, on the ground floor, and by casement windows with balconies and cornices of the first floor. Above the central bay, there was a clock flanked by pilasters supporting a segmental pediment, and behind the clock, there was an octagonal belfry. Internally, the principal rooms were the Salle du Conseil (council chamber), the Cabinet du Maire (mayor's parlour) and the Salle des Mariages (wedding room).

A bust by the sculptor, Auguste Maillard, depicting Marianne was installed in the main hall of the building in 1902, and four landscapes painted by Henri Bouvet were installed in the wedding room in 1904.

Following the liberation of the town by the French 2nd Armoured Division, commanded by General Philippe Leclerc, on 24 August 1944, during the Second World War, the mayor, Jacques Rehault, welcomed the chairman of the Provisional Government, General Charles de Gaulle, to the town hall and invited him to give a speech from the balcony on 28 February 1945.

Since the 1970s, the council has sought to generate income from filming: a comedy film entitled La Zizanie was shot in the town hall in 1978, and a film with a bizarre story-line entitled Korruption was shot there in 2014. In November 2017, it hosted a crossover i.e. mixing of two television series: Camping Paradis and Joséphine, ange gardien.
