= Protein crop =

Protein crops are crops that provide substantial protein, a large class of naturally occurring complex combinations of amino acids. Such crops, including various oilseeds and grains, are important in meeting the nutrient requirements of farm animals. EU Common Agricultural Policy designates certain protein crops as eligible for support, such as peas, field beans, and sweet lupins.
