= Francine Aubin =

French composer (1938–2016)

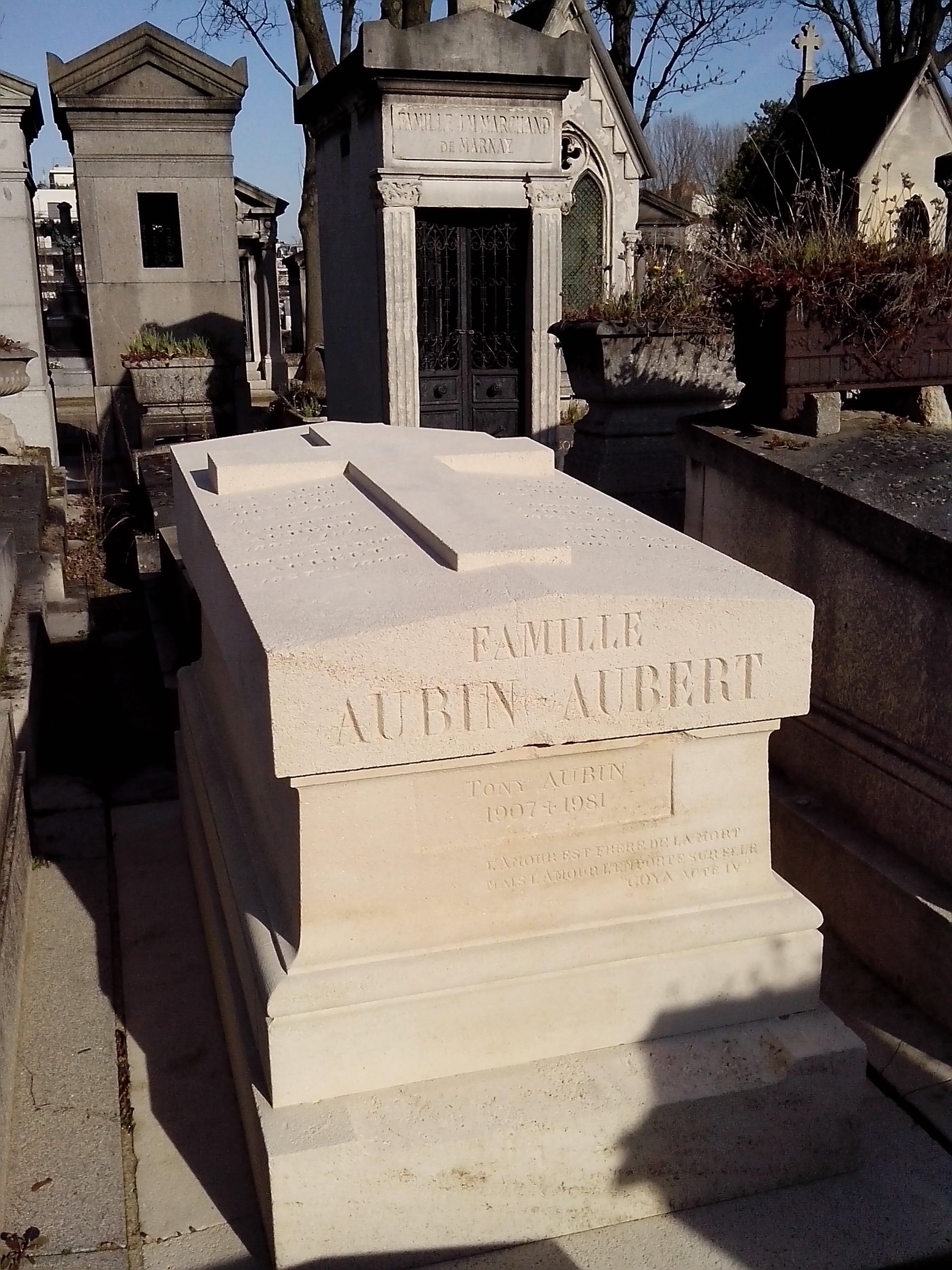
- Aubin's grave in the Père Lachaise Cemetery
- Born: Francine Agnès Gisèle Marie-Thérèse Tremblot de la Croix; 6 February 1938; Paris, France
- Died: 14 August 2016 (aged 78)
- Spouse: Tony Aubin

Francine Aubin (6 February 1938 – 14 August 2016) was a French composer, educator, conductor, and painter. She is most remembered for her variety of music for wind instruments.

== Life ==
Francine Aubin was born on 6 February 1938, in Paris to Richard Tremblot de la Croix and Marie-Thérèse Mauchauffée, the youngest of their five children. Her birth name was Francine Agnès Gisèle Marie-Thérèse Tremblot de la Croix.

She began her musical studies at the Troyes Conservatory, taking classes in harmony, flute, piano, and music theory. Aubin continued her education at the Paris Conservatory, where she studied composition with Tony Aubin, whom she would later marry.

In 1958, Francine earned the conservatory's first prize in composition. She continued on to win both the Grand Prize in composition at the Divonne-les-Bains International Competition and the first prize for piano improvisation at the Lyon International Competition.

In 1969, she became the first woman to earn a Certificat d'aptitude aux fonctions de directeur de conservatoire from the conservatory.

Amongst her achievements, Aubin became the director of the municipal conservatory of the 12th arrondissement of Paris, and in 1989 began her tenure as the director of the Rueil-Malmaison Conservatory and its associated symphony orchestra. Between 1970 and 1973, she took a pause from composing music to focus on her painting, which was often in a pointillist style. Aubin exhibited under the name "Tremblot de la Croix" or sometimes even just "Tremblot."

== Death ==
Aubin died on 14 August 2016.

== Selected works ==
=== Solo and chamber music ===
- 12 Études-caprices pour clarinette
- Ainsi racontent les nuages: saxophone alto mi bémol et piano
- Amulettes et grigris: percussion et piano
- Aquarelles: pour flûte et piano
- Ballade du gitan for bassoon and piano
- Berceuse pour Olivier: flûte ou hautbois et piano
- Chanson dans la rue: pour saxophone alto mi♭ et piano
- Concerto pour saxophone alto et piano
- Concerto pour tuba et piano
- Concerto pour violoncello et piano
- Deux pièces en forme de jazz: pour clarinette si♭ et piano
- L'amour espiègle, pour 8 cors

=== Works for orchestra ===
- Concerto: clarinette sib et orchestre à cordes
- Concerto Pour Ariane for double bass and orchestra
- Concerto pour cor et orchestre à cordes
- Concerto pour orgue et orchestre
- Symphonie (n°1) Allégorique
- Symphonie (n°2) de l'Espoir
- Symphonie juive
- Symphonie Kiev
