= Canton of Asnières-sur-Seine =

Administrative division of Hauts-de-Seine, France

Coordinates: 48.91°N 2.29°E

The canton of Asnières-sur-Seine is an administrative division of the Hauts-de-Seine department, in northern France. It was created at the French canton reorganisation which came into effect in March 2015. Its seat is in Asnières-sur-Seine.

It consists of the following communes:

1. Asnières-sur-Seine (partly)
