= Tony Aubin =

French composer (1907–1981)

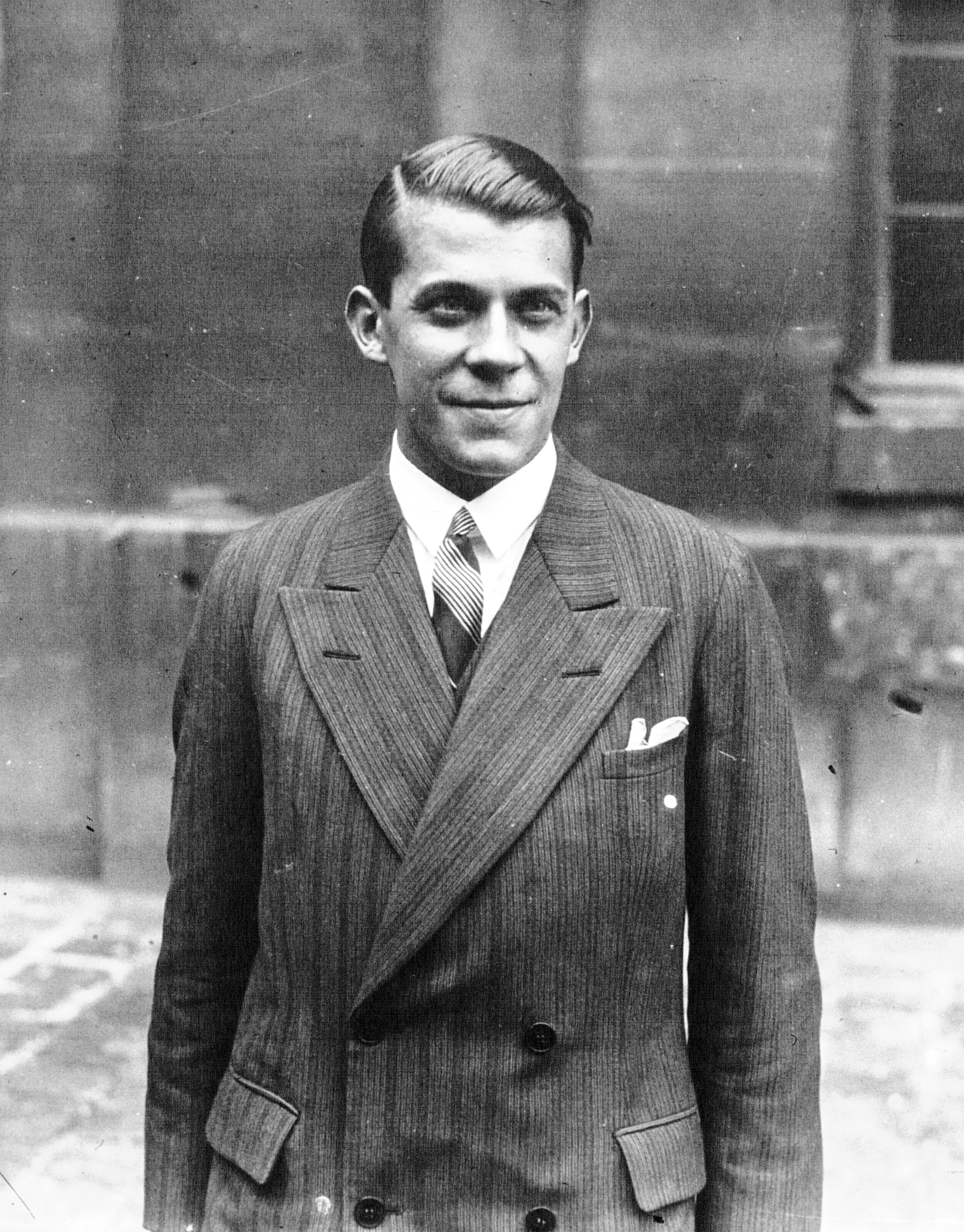
- Aubin in 1930
- Born: Tony Louis Alexandre Aubin; 8 December 1907; Paris, France
- Died: 21 September 1981 (aged 73); Paris, France
- Occupation: Composer
- Spouse: Francine Aubin

Tony Louis Alexandre Aubin (French pronunciation: [tɔni lwi alɛksɑ̃dʁ obɛ̃]; 8 December 1907 – 21 September 1981) was a French composer.

== Life and career ==
Aubin was born in Paris on 8 December 1907. From 1925 to 1930, he studied at the Paris Conservatory under Samuel Rousseau (music theory), Noel Gallon (counterpoint), Philippe Gaubert (orchestration and composition), and Paul Dukas (composition). He was awarded the Prix de Rome for the cantata Actaeon in 1930.

He was artistic director at Paris-Mondial from 1937 to 1944, and professor at the Paris Conservatory from 1944 to 1977. He also conducted works for French radio between 1945 and 1960. His works, heavily indebted to the impressionism of Ravel and Dukas, include many film scores.

His pupils included Olivier Alain, Garbis Aprikian, Raynald Arseneault, Jocelyne Binet, Jacques Castérède, Pierre Cochereau, Marius Constant, Ginette Keller, Talivaldis Kenins, Yüksel Koptagel, Ron Nelson, Makoto Shinohara, Francine Aubin, and Williametta Spencer.

== Works ==
- Piano Sonata, 1930
- Quatuor à cordes, 1930–1933
- Prélude, Récitatif et Finale for piano, 1930–1933
- Six Poèmes de Verlaine, 1932–1933
- Cressida, Melodrama, 1934
- 1er Sinfonie, "Romantique", 1935–1937
- Le Sommeil d'Iskender, 1936
- Cantilène variée for cello and piano, 1937
- La Chasse infernale (Le chevalier Pécopin), Scherzo Symphonique, 1941–1942
- Jeanne d'Arc à Orléans, Oratorio, 1942
- Suite danoise, 1942–1945
- Athalie, 1943
- Symphony No. 2, 1944
- François Villon, 1945
- Fourberies, Ballet, 1950–1952
- Variations on a theme of Franz Schubert, Ballet, 1953
- Grand pas on a theme of Johannes Brahms, Ballet, 1953
- Suite éolienne for flute, clarinet, and orchestra, 1956
- Périls, Lyrical drama, 1956–1958
- La Source, 1960
- Hymne à d'espérance, 1961
- Concertinetto for violin and piano, 1964
- Concertinetto del amicizia for flute and piano, 1965
- Concertino della Brughiera for bassoon and piano, 1966–1975
- Divertimento del incertezza for clarinet and piano or orchestra, 1967/ 1973
- La Jeunesse de Goya, opera, 1968–1970
- Concertino delle scoiattolo for oboe, piano and strings, 1970
- Au fil de l'eau, 1970
- Toccatrotta, 1972
- Hidalgoyas for guitar, 1975
- Passacaglia dell'addio for viola and piano, 1977

== Filmography ==
- 1941 : The Pavilion Burns (Jacques de Baroncelli)
- 1942 : À l'assaut des Aiguilles du Diable (Marcel Ichac)
- 1943 : White Wings
- 1943 : Le Corbeau (Henri-Georges Clouzot)
- 1943 : Sondeurs d'abîmes (Marcel Ichac)
- 1943 : Ceux du rivage
- 1944 : The Ménard Collection
- 1949 : The Pretty Miller Girl
- 1952 : Groenland, 20 000 lieues sur les glaces (Marcel Ichac/Jean-Jacques Languepin)
- 1952 : Victoire sur l'Annapurna (Marcel Ichac)
- 1966 : Illusions perdues
