= Avril Group =

Agro-industrial group based in France

Avril
- Company type: Limited partnership with share capital
- Industry: activities of head offices
- Founded: 1983; 43 years ago
- Headquarters: Paris, France
- Area served: Europe, Africa, Asia
- Key people: Jean-Philippe Puig, Manager
- Products: Human and animal nutrition, renewable chemistry and energy
- Brands: Lesieur, Puget, Diester, Matines (France), Bunica (Romania), Taous, El Kef (Morocco)
- Revenue: €6.854 billion (2021)
- Net income: €59 millions (2020)
- Owner: Interprofessional Development Fund for the Oilseeds and Proteins (FIDOP); French Federation of Oilseed and Protein Crop Producers (FOP); Fondation Avril
- Number of employees: 7,350 (2021)
- Website: groupeavril.com/en

Avril is an international agro-industrial group based in France, specialising in food, animal feed, energy and sustainable chemistry. It was founded in 1983, on the initiative of a collective group of leaders in the French farming sector, and was structured as a subsidiary to ensure outlets for French oilseeds (rapeseed, sunflower, soy) and protein crops (Peas, faba beans, lupin).

Formerly known as Sofiproteol, the group adopted the name of Avril in 2015, during a change in governance and legal structure, and became a partnership limited by shares.

The Avril group operates in 19 countries and employs 7,350 employees. In 2021, its sales revenues amounted to 6.9 billion euros. It holds a portfolio of leading brands in several markets, particularly in Europe and Africa.

== History ==
=== 1962–1983: From Plan proteins to CNTA, the genesis of Sofiprotéol ===
In 1962, the Dillon Round world trade negotiations led to a massive influx of US soybeans, exempt from European customs. Soy, rich in protein, is needed as livestock feed. In June 1973, following an exceptional drought, the US government decreed an embargo on the export of seeds and oilcake. This caused prices to soar, reflecting an interdependence of French and European farmers.

In 1974, a Protein Plan is launched in France under the leadership of a young farmer and unionist, Jean-Claude Sabin, backed by the public authorities. The aim of the plan was to increase the production of oilseed rape, sunflower, peas, flax and field beans through creating a chain of French vegetable oil and protein. Two interprofessional organizations emerged : the National Interbranch Union of Protein-rich plants (UNIP) in 1976 and the National Interbranch Organisation of Oilseed and Oil fruits (ONIDOL) in 1978. These organizations merged in 2015, giving birth to Terres Univia.

In the 1970s, the National Syndicate of Agricultural Techniques (CNTA), a key player of the Protein Plan, became the industrial tool of the French oilseed sector. Its bankruptcy in 1983 undermined the sector most tied to production. To refloat, the interprofessional organizations decided to create a financial fund: Sofiprotéol.

=== 1983: Birth of Sofiprotéol ===
The new company has been considered as a financial player in the French sector of vegetable oils and proteins. Its shareholders have included many agricultural stakeholders: UNIP, ONIDOL, and the French Federation of Oilseed Producers (FOP), bringing together nearly 100,000 producers.

Sofiprotéol had five employees in 1983. It was chaired by Jean-Claude Sabin, with general management entrusted to Philippe Tillous-Borde, an agricultural engineer specialized in industrial investments. Together, they ran the company for nearly 20 years.

From the beginning, the objectives of Sofiprotéol were to financially secure production for the various players in the sector and to ensure an industrial outlet for oilseeds and protein crops. It first played the role of a financial institution as development bank in the sector. Then, in the following years, the company took over assets in the field of crushing seeds, seeds, and packaging of edible oils. This was the beginning of extending the agricultural sector with the construction of an industrial chain, from farmers, to seed storage agencies and seed producers.

=== 1987–93: development of a French biofuel sector ===
In search of French rapeseed markets, ONIDOL with the French Institute of Petroleum (IFP) launched the first studies establishing a biofuel based on methyl rapeseed esters in 1987. After three years of experimentation, Diester was launched in 1990.

From 1991 to 1995, the EU allocated FF300 million to support innovative projects in non-food applications of farming products, including biofuels. In 1992, France authorized the incorporation of biofuels in diesel up to 5% and to 30% for company vehicles. Sofiprotéol developed industrial activity through involvement in the management of biodiesel production facilities. This was the beginning of the biodiesel industry, marked by the construction of the first plant in Compiègne in 1988.

=== 1993–2006: Strengthening co-products strategy ===
In 1993, Sofiprotéol opened a large rapeseed and sunflower seed crushing factory in Grand-Couronne, near Rouen. With a capacity of 360,000 tons, the site supplied a new factory dedicated to the production of biodiesel in 1995. During this period, Sofiprotéol augmented and extended its sector strategy by developing its work in oleochemistry, biotechnologies, animal feed, and nutrition.

In 1996, Sofiprotéol created Novance in partnership with Rhône-Poulenc Chimie. Novance produced products derived from vegetable oils for non-food applications, such as glycerin. In 1998, the Group took stake in Glon Sanders, a leader in the French animal feed sector and a major outlet for oilseed. Glon was fully acquired in 2012. With the 2003 acquisition of Lesieur and Puget in 2004, the group became the primary manufacturer of edible oils in France. Between 2007 and 2008, six new units tripled the production of biodiesel, thanks to the Biofuel Plan launched by French public authorities.

=== 2007–15: Restructuring and internationalization ===
The 2000s were marked by a Sofiprotéol surge. The group changed the development of its businesses. In 2007, Sofiprotéol created two major business divisions: Oilseeds, responsible for enhancing vegetable oils, and Animal Products, developing the group's activities in the field of nutrition and livestock production with related expertise : biosafety, nutritional specialties, etc...

The group has strengthened its international position. With the 2008 acquisition of the Belgian company Oleon, the group has been the European leader in oleochemistry. With the 2010 acquisition of Expur in Romania, the Group gained a firm foothold in the oilseed production basin of Eastern Europe and the Black Sea. In 2011, Lesieur Cristal was acquired, Morocco's leader in not only oils and seeds, but also soaps. Through the Green Morocco Plan, Sofiprotéol supported a strategy to develop Moroccan industries based on rapeseed, sunflower, and olive oil.

In 2012, Jean-Philippe Puig succeeded Philippe Tillous-Borde as head of group. In 2015, the group adopted new governance and a new identity. Industrial activities were assigned to the limited partnership with share capital (SCA), Avril. Sofiprotéol remains as an investment company under the control of Avril Group.

=== 2015–21: New identity and new activities ===
The Group, which was formerly known as Sofiprotéol, became a limited partnership with share capital "société en commandite par actions" and adopted the name "Avril" in 2015. This operation allows the Group's industrial activities to be more clearly distinguished from those of its investment company (which kept the name Sofiprotéol).

The Avril Group announced the acquisition of the Kerfoot Group in 2015, a UK family-owned company specialized in the distribution and packaging of Oils, primarily for the food, cosmetics and food service industries. The Lesieur subsidiary of the Avril Group became the majority shareholder of SPHB (Société de Production des Huiles de Bourbon). In 2016, the Group invested in a new factory, inaugurated by Manuel Valls, for the bottling and packaging of Lesieur vegetable oils in Bassens.

In 2016, the Avril Group launched a Sofiprotéol Private Debt fund with the management company Tikehau IM, to facilitate the funding of agribusiness and food processing industries. In 2016, the Avril Group set up an integrated rapeseed sector in Tunisia, in partnership with the local government.

In May 2018, Avril announced the acquisition of a majority participation in Costa d'Oro, an Italian olive oil producer (the Castel Group is taking a minority interest). In November 2018, Avril launched Oleo100, a fuel created from French rapeseed (and the first 100% vegetable fuel produced in France). In January 2019, Avril acquired Lecico, a German company specialized in lecithin and Phospholipids. Saipol, a subsidiary of Avril, launched OleoZE in February 2020, a purchasing service for sustainable French oilseeds. The platform enables farmers and collecting organizations to market their rapeseed and sunflower seeds by rewarding farming practices that reduce CO2 emissions.

From a financial point of view, this period was also characterized by the Group's return to being profitable in 2018 (the price of oil having penalized its biofuels business in previous years) and 2019, when net profit doubled from 16 million to 35 million euros.

In 2019, Avril joined forces with Terrena to create an industrial unit with an annual capacity of 30,000 metric tons, specializing in the crushing of organic oilseeds, intended to produce 100% French livestock feed and organic oils.

In 2021, Avril decided to refocus on plants. The group sold the biosafety company Théséo and announced that it would also sell its egg and pork activities. In Dieppe, together with the Dutch group DSM, Avril is building a unit dedicated to the production of rapeseed proteins, which is being run by the company Prolein. The protein will be extracted by an innovative process without chemical solvents. The company Olatein will produce the vegetable protein for producers of vegetable juices, steak and protein bars.

== Key figures ==
Gross sales and EBITDA since 2013
Year	Gross sales (euros)	EBITDA (euros)
2021	6.9 billion	356B +46% vs 2020
2020	5.8 billion	243B +43% vs 2019
2019	5.8 billion	170B +11% vs 2018
2018	6.1 billion	154B +26% vs 2017
2017	6.2 billion	122B −16% vs 2016
2016	5.9 billion	144B
2015	6.1 billion	206B
2014	6.5 billion	259B +23% vs 2013
2013	7 billion	211B

== Activities ==
=== Avril Vegetal ===
The Avril Végétal sector brings together vegetable processing activities from rapeseed and sunflower grains, as well as the sale of the resulting products. The sunflower and rapeseed seeds are collected then crushed to extract the vegetable oil and oil seed meal, destined for animal feed. Edible oil produced from this activity include Lesieur, Puget, Soléou, and Guénard in France; Lesieur Cristal in Morocco; and Bunica in Romania. It employed 3,279 people in 2020 for an EBITDA of €93,2 million. In 2020, 3.3 million tons of seeds were transformed by Avril.

Main subsidiaries: Saipol, Expur, Kerfoot, Lecico, Novastell, Lesieur, Lesieur, Cristal, Costa d'Oro.

==== Human nutrition ====
Avril Group is the largest producer of table oils in France (Lesieur, Puget, Fruit d'Or, Soléou, Guénard), Morocco (Lesieur Cristal) and Romania (Bunica). By contributing to 1.2 million tons of oil in 2014, Avril participated in the daily supply of 81 million individuals. The group also manufactures oil and vegetable based sauces and condiments.

==== Renewable energies ====
Avril produces under the brand Diester, a fifth of 11 million tons of biodiesel consumed annually by the European Union. It is the leading European producer of biodiesel. Diester is incorporated at a rate of 8% in the fuel used by all French diesel vehicles. Diester is a first-generation biofuel, made from rapeseed and sunflower vegetable oil.

Avril invests in research to develop second-generation biofuels. The target being to market biofuels from the inedible parts of plants and agricultural waste (lignin, cellulose) to produce food and energy. In 2013, The group launched a production of biodiesel based on animal fats and waste oils. The group participates in BioTfueL, a program that develops biodiesel and biokerosene from forestry waste (straw, wood, etc.). Avril also initiated Institute PIVERT, in Picardy. Institute PIVERT is the first European center developing plant chemistry based on oilseed biomass, collaborating with hundreds of researchers.

==== Oleochemicals and renewable chemistry ====
Through the 1996 creation of Novance and the 2008 acquisition of Oleon, Avril has dominated the European market of oleochemistry. Oleochemistry is a branch of "plant chemistry" developing chemical molecules, commonly referred to as bio-based molecules. Avril manufactures and markets a range of bio-based molecules from vegetable oils (rapeseed, sunflower, palm, soy, coconut). Among other molecules, Avril produces glycerol, a biodiesel byproduct. Glycerol is a non-toxic liquid, with a sweet taste, that is used in many pharmaceutical, cosmetic, and food products.

Through Lesieur Cristal, Avril produces soaps in Morocco, marketed under the brands Taous and El Kef.

=== Avril Livestock Sector ===
The Avril Farming division brings together the Group's animal activities. It includes the processing and sales of farm products (particularly eggs and pork). These activities are dedicated to either human consumption or animal nutrition. It employed 2 118 people in 2020 for an EBITDA of €21 million. The main subsidiaries of the Avril Livestock Sector are Sanders, Imevia, Sunfeed, Kiriel.

==== Animal nutrition and production ====
Through Sanders, Adonial, and others companies, Avril produces and sells rapeseed and sunflower oilseed meal. Extracted from oilseeds, these solid residues are rich in protein. Crushed and mixed with other ingredients (protein, grains, vitamins, etc.), they are intended to feed farm animals such as pigs, cattle, poultry, and rabbits. 2.7 million tons of animal feed are sold each year to Avril's partner farmers (26,000). One hundred million chickens are fed annually by Avril. European rapeseed and sunflower press cakes are a substitute for American soybean press cakes.

==== Biosafety and nutritional specialties ====
Biosecurity covers all preventive hygiene methods to minimize the infection and spread of diseases in livestock. In 2014, the group created Mixscience and Theseo, both having developed a reputation in France and abroad, around products and services for the hygiene of animal shelters, breeding material and treatment of water, air and surfaces.

==== Processing and distribution of food products ====
Since 2005, Avril has produced and marketed eggs known as Matines. Through Ovoteam and 3 Vallées, Avril supplies eggs for the agribusiness industry.

=== Avril development ===
This division brings together four activities: proteochemistry (renewable chemistry derived from plant oil cakes), treatment of byproducts from the food industry, transformation of organic waste into fertilizers and purchases of raw materials for third parties.

This division includes in particular:

- Terrial (organic fertilization), in which Suez holds 25% of the capital since 2019.

- Evertree, founded in 2016, which designs and develops alternatives to the traditional chemical intermediates generating volatile organic compounds (VOCs). Derived from rapeseed cake, the products and technologies developed by Evertree permit the design of wood composite panels that are more economical, and safe for health and more environmentally friendly. In 2019, the joint venture with BPI France and BPT commercialized a solution that reduces the presence of petrosourced resin and the pollution linked to the volatile organic compounds generated by these resins.

Main subsidiaries: Adonial, Terrial, Feed Alliance, Evertree

=== Investor Profession: Sofiprotéol ===
Sofiprotéol assists with loans and equity investments for over a hundred companies, representing approximately 80,000 employees in the agro-industry and in related sectors such as dairy processing. Sofiprotéol is committed to its partners on a permanent basis. The company strengthens the equity of companies, supporting them in their strategic decisions and modernization.

Following restructuring ratified in 2015, the shareholders of Sofiprotéol – Crédit Agricole, Natixis, Unigrains – became more involved. With a capital base from 70 to 330 million euros, Sofiprotéol intends to expand its scope of action to new sectors of agro-industry. Sofiprotéol has invested €276M since 2015, of which 11% has been invested in innovation. Xavier Dorchies was nominated Chief Operating Officer of Sofiprotéol, succeeding Michel Boucly in January 2020.

Sofiprotéol is committed in the following activities:

- Collection processing of agricultural products
- Upstream plant production
- Upstream animal production
- Investment funds
- Food products and consumer goods
- Sofiproteol dette privée (debt fund)
- Sustainable innovation, other

== Governance ==
=== Shareholders ===
The historical shareholders of the group are:

- Interprofessional Development Fund for the Oilseeds and Proteins (FIDOP)
- French Federation of Oilseed and Protein Crop Producers (FOP)

With the restructuring, a new player entered into the group's capital in 2014: Fondation Avril.

=== Group organization in Avril ===
Avril Group is a limited partnership with share capital (SCA) comprising two categories of partners:

- Limited partners, who represent the shareholders, exercise control through the supervisory board.
- The General Partner, who acts as manager of the Group through Avril Gestion. The Board of Avril Gestion appoints the manager of the SCA. The manager is supported by an executive committee.

By adopting the status of a limited partnership with share capital (SCA), historical shareholders of Sofiprotéol, the oilseed producers intend to remain at the heart of the project led by Avril.

==== Supervisory Board ====
The supervisory board is composed of eight members, six of which represent FIDOP, FOP, and Fondation Avril. Within this council also sit two elected staff members of the group. The supervisory board is currently chaired by Jacques Siret, President of Terre Univia.

==== Management Board ====
The management board of Avril Gestion decides on the major strategic and financial decisions of Avril.

In 2020, it consisted of nine members, four from the FOP, three qualified professionals and two former executives or former corporate officers of the Group:

- Arnaud Rousseau, President of Avril Gestion, President of the FOP
- Jean-Pierre Denis, Chairman of Crédit Mutuel Arkéa and Crédit mutuel de Bretagne
- Anne Lauvergeon, CEO of ALP Services and President of Sigfox
- Sylvie Rucar, consultant
- Sébastien Windsor, vice-president of the FOP
- Antoine Henrion, FOP Office Member
- Benjamin Lammert, FOP Office Member
- Yves Delaine, Former Group Executive of Avril
- Michel Boucly, Former Group Executive of Avril

==== Executive committee ====
The executive committee is headed by the Avril Group's Director and the Sofiprotéol's Executive Director, elected by the board of directors of Avril Gestion, Jean-Philippe Puig.

The executive committee consists of 9 other members:

- Xavier Dorchies, chief operating officer Sofiprotéol, Chief Strategy and Development Officer Avril
- Aymeric Mongeaud, chief financial officer, also oversees legal affairs and information systems
- Stéphane Yrles, Secretary General
- Moussa Naciri, General manager of the Avril Specialties Business Line, overseeing the Group's oleochemicals and animal specialties activities
- Paul Joël Derian, Vice President for Innovation, Research & Sustainable Development
- Marie de La Roche Kerandraon, Vice President for Human Resources and Engagement
- Christophe Le Bars, general manager of the Livestock Business Line
- Antoine Prevost, Group chief operating officer. In charge of industrial performance and the supply chain, as well as operational excellence

=== Fondation Avril ===
Avril Group is committed to pay 35% of its dividends to a foundation bearing its name and recognized as a public service by decree on 11 December 2014.

The foundation supports causes of general interest and is attached to three sustainable development goals:

- to contribute to preserving a high-quality environment in different territories and ensuring collective development of rural communities;
- to aid developing regions of the world, notably in Africa, in working to protect biodiversity and anticipating the impact of climate change on agricultural productions;
- to promote a healthy and sustainable diet through high quality products that are environmentally friendly and accessible to all.

The foundation is chaired by Philippe Tillous-Borde, co-founder of the Group in 1983. Appointed July 2015, Philippe Leroux is the director. Former director of the French Development Agency (AFD), Jean-Michel Severino is treasurer.

== Bibliography ==
=== Books ===
- Centre national de la cooperation agricole (CNCA), ed. (1975), Cooperation agricole (in French), vol. 21, Paris: Société auxiliaire pour la distribution des éditions de productivité, p. 220
- Azouvi, Alain, ed. (1984), Les industries agricoles et alimentaires en 1983 (in French), Paris: INSEE, p. 112
- de Perthuis, Christian, ed. (1993), Agriculture 2000 : le livre blanc, les stratégies agricoles face à la nouvelle PAC. Un enjeu majeur pour la France : l'adaptation de la filière grains (in French), Paris: Economica, p. 192, ISBN 9782717824759
- Jamet, Jean-Claude, ed. (1993), Le Diester, les enjeux du diesel vert : un avenir pour l'agriculture (in French), Paris: Edition de l'environnement, p. 365, ISBN 9782908620092
- Ballerini, Daniel, ed. (2006), Les biocarburants : état des locationx, perspectives et enjeux du développement (in French), Paris: Éditions Technip, p. 352, ISBN 9782710808695
- Observatoire économique, social et territorial de la Vendée (OESTV), ed. (2006), Réflexions sur la valorisation non-alimentaire de la biomasse (in French), La-Roche-sur-Yon: OESTV, p. 54
- Schneider, Anne; Huygue, Christian, eds. (2015), Les légumineuses pour des systèmes agricoles et alimentaires durables (in French), Versailles: Éditions Quæ, p. 512, ISBN 978-2-7592-2334-3
- Le Bourdonnec, Yannick; Tillous-Borde, Philippe, eds. (2015), Un homme d'entreprise visionnaire : 40 ans au service d'une ambition agricole pour la France (in French), Paris: Éditions Eyrolles, p. 180, ISBN 978-2-212-56174-6

=== Newspapers ===
La France Agricole

- La France Agricole (2002). "Sofiprotéol et Cereol concluent un accord financier sur Lesieur". La France Agricole (in French). No. 2963. Archived from the original on 2015-09-18. (consulted 18 September 2015)
- La France Agricole (2007). "Alimentation animale : Sofiproteol reprend Glon". La France Agricole (in French). Archived from the original on 2015-09-18. (consulted 18 September 2015)
- La France Agricole (2008). "Diester Industrie acquiert le belge Oleon". La France Agricole (in French). Archived from the original on 2015-05-24. (consulted 21 September 2015)
- La France Agricole (9 June 2015). "La filière se structure autour de Terres Univia et Terres Inovia". La France Agricole (in French). Archived from the original on 2015-09-17. (consulted 17 September 2015)

Les Echos

- Cougard, Marie-Josée (2005). "Glon et Coopagri s'allient dans les ovoproduits". Les Echos (in French). (consulted 21 September 2015)
- Les Echos (2010). "Bretagne : le Groupe Glon acquiert Porcgros". Les Echos (in French). Archived from the original on 2015-12-22. (consulted 21 September 2015)
- du Guerny, Stanislas (2011). "Le Groupe Glon s'empare de Sopral". Les Echos (in French). (consulted 21 September 2015)
- Delanglade, Sabine (2013). "Sofiprotéol, l'essence du succès". Les Echos (in French). (consulted 18 September 2015)
- Roussange, Guillaume (2014). "L'institut Pivert va activer la chimie végétale française". Les Echos (in French). (consulted 21 September 2015)
- Cougard, Marie-Josée (2014). "Avec Matines, le groupe Sofiprotéol veut réveiller le marché de l'oeuf". Les Echos (in French). (consulted 21 September 2015)
- Cougard, Marie-Josée (7 January 2015a). "Sofiprotéol se rebaptise Avril et change de gouvernance". Les Echos (in French). (consulted 22 October 2015)
- Cougard, Marie-Josée (27 May 2015e). "Avril crée une filière huile au Maroc avec Lesieur Cristal". Les Echos (in French). (consulted 21 September 2015)
- Landrieu, Valérie (2015). "La mutation juridique de Sofiprotéol". Les Echos (in French). (consulted 21 October 2015)

L'Usine nouvelle

- L'Usine nouvelle (13 June 1996). "Chimie : Partenariat dans la lipochimie". L'Usine nouvelle (in French). No. 2553. (consulted 18 September 2015)
- Moal, Catherine (13 September 2004). "Lesieur rachète l'huile d'olive Puget". L'Usine nouvelle (in French). (consulted 18 September 2015)
- du Guerny, Stanislas (27 July 2007). "Sofiprotéol prend le contrôle de Glon". L'Usine nouvelle (in French). (consulted 18 September 2015)
- Cahuzac, Adrien (8 January 2015). "Sofiprotéol adopte Avril comme nouveau nom". L'Usine nouvelle (in French). (consulted 20 September 2015)

Others

- Vincent, Marie-Hombeline (2002). "Oléagineux et protéagineux – Soja : le seul et même concurrent". Réussir Grandes Cultures (in French). No. 148. (consulted 17 September 2015)
- Entrepreneur Vert (2010). "Chimie verte". Entrepreneur Vert (in French). Archived from the original on 2016-03-03. (consulted 21 September 2015)
- Ministère de l'Ecologie, du Développement durable et de l'Energie (MEDDE) (2011). "Les EMAG : esters méthyliques d'acide gras". La filière biocarburant gazole (in French). Archived from the original on 2015-12-22. (consulted 21 September 2015)
- Garnier, Juliette (2012). "Sofiprotéol, ce conglomérat qui veille sur l'avenir de Doux". La Tribune (in French). (consulted 21 September 2015)
- Le Douarin, Pascal (10 April 2014). "Le groupe Sofiprotéol mise sur le développement international". Réussir Aviculture (in French). Archived from the original on 2015-01-08. (consulted 18 September 2015)
- Duboelle, Philippe (20 May 2014). "Sofiproteol souffle ses 30 bougies". Horizons Nord-Pas de Calais (in French). Archived from the original on 2016-03-03. (consulted 17 September 2015)
- Monnier, L. (2014). "Biocarburants : Total lancera à l'automne le chantier BioTfuel à Dunkerque". Agri44 (in French). Archived from the original on 2016-03-03. (consulted 21 September 2015)
- Vergonjeanne, Robin (26 May 2014). "Sofiprotéol : deux nouvelles sociétés pour renforcer son pôle animal". Terre-Net (in French). (consulted 21 September 2015)
- Laurent, Samuel (2015). "Que reprochent ses détracteurs à Xavier Beulin, patron de la FNSEA ?". Le Monde (in French). (consulted 22 October 2015)
- Lentschner, Keren; de La Chesnais, Eric (2015). "Avril, un géant de l'huile au cœur de l'agroalimentaire français". Le Figaro (in French)., (consulted 11 January 2016)
- Monteil, Michel (2015). "Philippe Tillous-Borde, plus de 30 ans au service de l'agro-industrie". Sud Ouest (in French). Monteil2015., (consulted 11 January 2016)
- Delfortrie, Perrine; Plagnol, Hervé (2015). "La Fondation Avril annonce ses objectifs". Agra Presse Hebdo (in French)., (consulted 11 January 2016)

=== Websites ===
- EurObserv (July 2014). Biofuel barometer (PDF) (Report). (consulted 20 September 2015)
- Ouest-France (14 September 2015). "Jean-Baptiste Bachelerie". Ouest-France (in French). (consulted 22 October 2015)

=== University works ===
- Boemare, Catherine, ed. (2001), Quel système de régulation des activités polluantes ? Le cas des sources mobiles de pollution atmosphérique (in French), Ecole des Hautes Etudes en Sciences Sociales, p. 366
- Mathieu, Alain, ed. (1998), L'interface entre secteur agricole et secteur petrolier: Quelques questions au sujet des biocarburants (in French), Université de Montpellier I, p. 38

=== Primary sources ===
- History: 1973–1983, Avril, archived from the original on 2015-10-22 (consulted 18 September 2015)
- History: 1983–1993, Avril, archived from the original on 2015-10-22 (consulted 21 September 2015)
- History: 1993–2006, Avril, archived from the original on 2015-10-22 (consulted 20 September 2015)
- History: 2006–2015, Avril, archived from the original on 2015-10-22 (consulted 21 September 2015)
- Avril Group, ed. (2015). A new springtime for the oils and proteins sectors : Activity Report 2014 (PDF) (Report). Paris: Avril. p. 65.
- Boucly, Michel (2014). "Sofiprotéol répartit la valeur ajoutée au sein de la filière des oléagineux et des protéagineux". BipiZ (in French). (consulted 18 September 2015)
