= Bertrand P. Collomb =

French business executive (1942–2019)

Bertrand Collomb
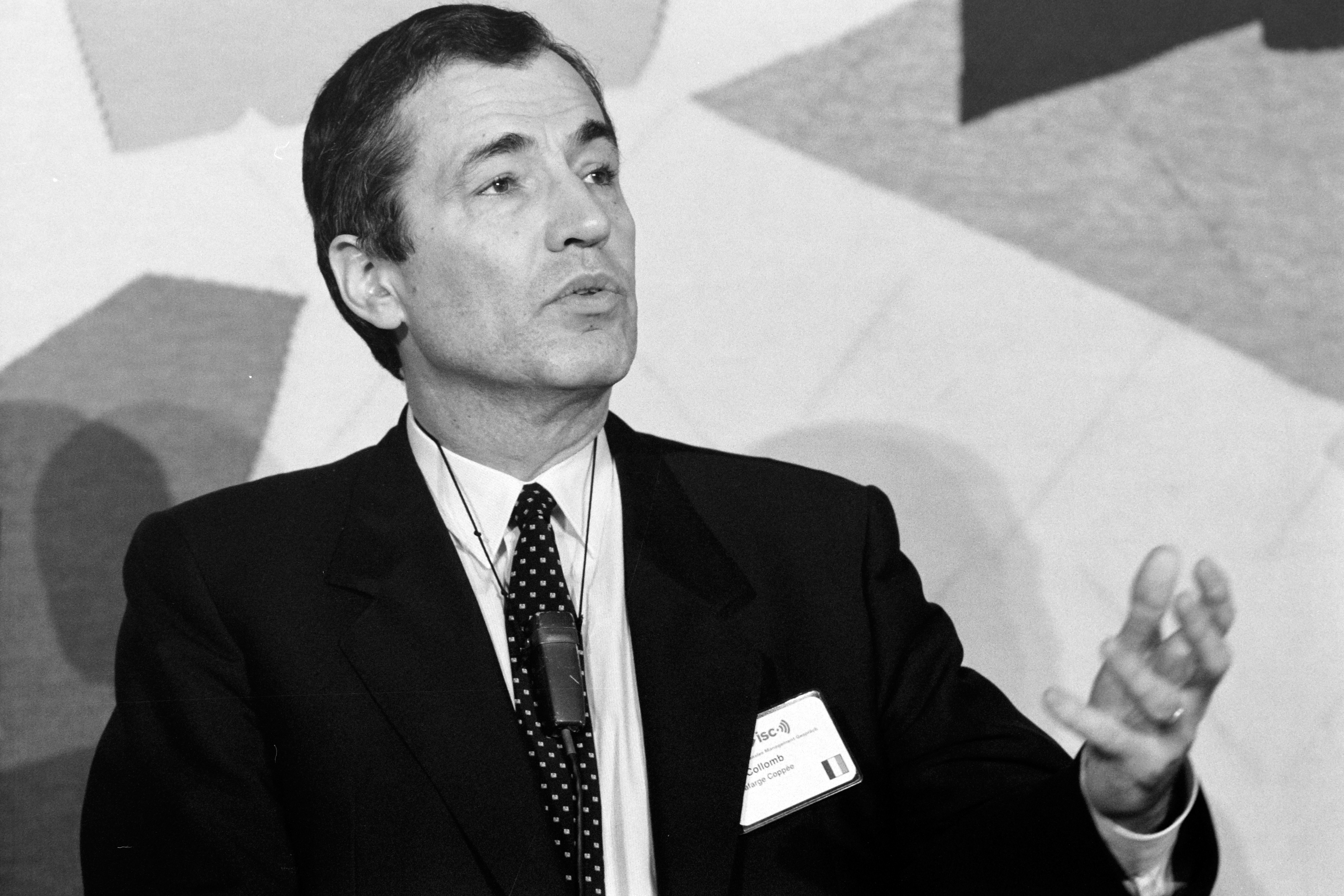
- Collomb in 1991
- Born: 14 August 1942; Lyon, France
- Died: 24 May 2019 (aged 76); Paris, France
- Education: Lycée du Parc; École Polytechnic; Mines Paris tech
- Occupation: Businessman

Bertrand P. Collomb (14 August 1942 – 24 May 2019) was a French business executive.

== Career ==
He was director of LafargeHolcim, the company resulting from the merger of Lafarge and its Swiss competitor, in 2015. He is also honorary chairman of Lafarge, after having served as the chairman and chief executive officer of Lafarge SA from July 1989 to May 2003, and its chairman until 2007, senior executive vice president from 1987 to January 1989 and also served as its chief operating officer.

Collomb was a member of the Institut de France (Académie des sciences morales et politiques).

Collomb was a director of several international companies, including Allianz, Unilever, Vivendi, DuPont, Total and ATCO.

He was also the chairman of the World Business Council for Sustainable Development in 2004–2005, and of the think tank Institut français des relations internationales.

Collomb was part of the "Coppens commission" which prepared the French Charter for the Environment of 2004.

== Personal life ==
He was the son of Charles Collomb (1901–1982) and Hélène Traon, and the grandson of Charles Collomb (1870–1933) and Catherine Ogier. He had three children from his first marriage to Caroline Wirth.

Collomb graduated in 1960 from the École Polytechnique and the Ecole des Mines with a degree in law. He then earned a PhD in Management at the University of Texas.

== Death ==
On 25 May 2019 LafargeHolcim announced that Collomb had died at the age of 76.

== Honors and awards ==
- Grand Officer of the Ordre National du Mérite
- Commandeur of the Order of Legion of Honour
- Knight of the Ordre des Palmes Académiques
- Knight of the Ordre des Arts et des Lettres
