= Paris-Mondial =

Programming
- Language: Multilingual
- Format: Variety

Ownership
- Owner: French Republic

Paris-Mondial (later known as Voice of France) was a French-government-owned shortwave external service radio station that began broadcasting in 1937. After the fall of France, it continued broadcasting a domestic-only program.

== Origins ==
Paris-Mondial first broadcast in 1937, targeting an international audience with multilingual programming. Its sign-on for its U.S.-directed broadcasts was "Hello, America!". A 1938 survey of French embassies reported that Paris-Mondial enjoyed a clear signal in North America, though reception in Africa and the Caribbean was spotty.

== Second World War ==
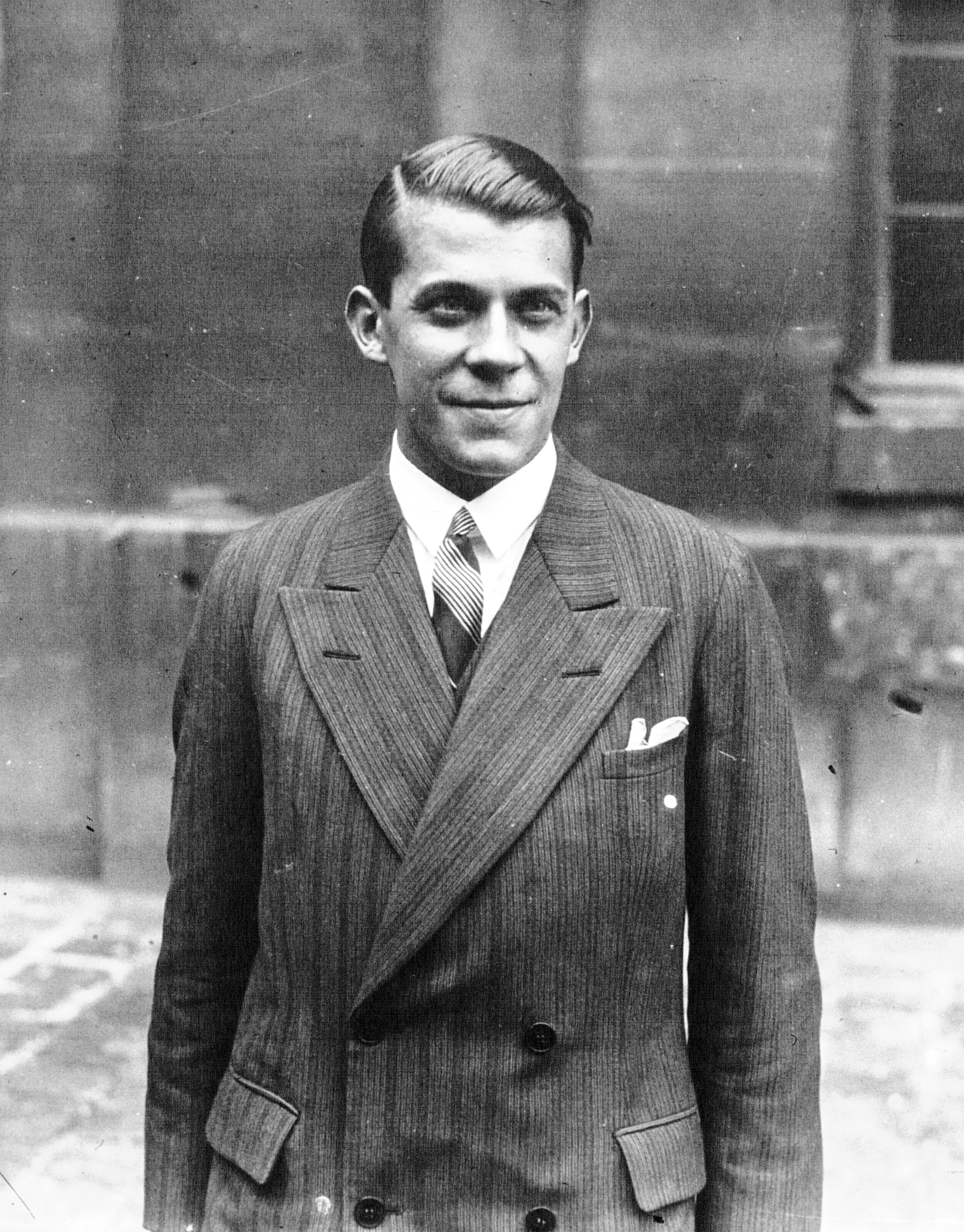
Tony Aubin, artistic director of Paris-Mondial

Following the invasion of France in 1940, Paris-Mondial eliminated all non-English programming and began a non-stop schedule of broadcasts that included, ultimately fruitless, appeals for help by Frenchmen who had lived or worked in the United States.

On June 9, 1940, the staff of Paris-Mondial abandoned their facilities in Paris and evacuated to a series of backup facilities, first in Poitiers and, after that became untenable, to Bordeaux. As of June 12, the monitoring centres of the U.S. networks NBC and CBS reported the station was continuing to transmit its "usual newscasts" and could still be picked up in New York City. However, this routine soon gave way to "recordings of military marches and panicked appeals for guns, tanks, and planes". On June 14 the station went off-air, returning on June 15 with the sign-on "this is Paris-Mondial, broadcasting from somewhere in France". Programming became increasingly intermittent during the final days of the French Third Republic. In its last hours, the station's broadcasts consisted almost exclusively of frantic talk-format programs "begging for aid".

After the fall of France, Paris-Mondial was rebranded by the government of the État Français as "the Voice of France" and aired a mixture of original programming and rebroadcasts of German radio, all internally directed (under the terms of the French surrender, international broadcasting was prohibited). When broadcasting German programming, Voice of France operated under the name "Y".

From 1937 to 1944, the artistic director of Paris-Mondial / Voice of France was Tony Aubin.

== See also ==
- Radio France Internationale
