= Ginette Keller =

French composer

- Born: 16 May 1925; Asnières-sur-Seine, France
- Died: June 27, 2010 (aged 85)
- Occupation: Composer

Ginette Keller (16 May 1925 - 27 June 2010) was a French composer.

== Biography ==
Keller was born in Asnières-sur-Seine. She studied at the Conservatoire de Paris with Nadia Boulanger, Tony Aubin and Olivier Messiaen. In 1951 she won the Second Prix de Rome with her cantata Et l'Homme vit se rouvrir les portes and in 1957 won second prize in the Queen Elisabeth Competition.

She taught aural training at the "Conservatoire" and analysis and counterpoint at the École Normale de Musique in Paris. She has composed for solo instruments, chamber and orchestral music. She has also written two operas with librettos by Alain Germain.

== Selected works ==
- Six chants de Lumière et d'Ombre for winds quartet, 1965
- Variables, premiered in 1966
- Chant de Parthénope for flute & piano, 1968
- Girations for percussion & piano, 1970
- Graphiques for soprano and ensemble, premiered at Festival International du Son 1971
- Ebauches for bassoon & piano, 1973
- Les Vieilles Dames d'Osnabrück, Opera, premiered in 1983
- Les adieux d'une cantatrice sans mémoire, Opera, premiered in 1986
- Vibrations pour harpe celtique, 1990
- Dialogues for clarinet & piano, 1992
- Sept mouvements incantatoires for four percussions, drums, celesta & a bowed instrument
- Paramorphoses for metals orchestra, piano & percussion
- Et l’Homme vit se rouvrir les portes, cantata
- Dialogues for clarinet & piano
- Tropes for piano
