= Saint-Flour-l'Étang =

- Commune
- Coat of arms
- Location of Saint-Flour-l'Étang
- Location within France Location within Auvergne-Rhône-Alpes
- Coordinates: 45°42′36″N 3°30′18″E
- Country: France
- Region: Auvergne-Rhône-Alpes
- Department: Puy-de-Dôme
- Arrondissement: Thiers
- Canton: Les Monts du Livradois

Government
  - Mayor (2026–32): Christophe Dos Santos
- Area^{1}: 9.45 km^{2} (3.65 sq mi)
- Elevation: 525 m (1,722 ft)
- Highest elevation: 561 m (1,841 ft)
- Lowest elevation: 319 m (1,047 ft)
- Population (2023): 268
  - Density: 28.4/km^{2} (73.5/sq mi)
- Time zone: UTC+01:00 (CET)
  - Summer (DST): UTC+02:00 (CEST)
- INSEE/Postal code: 63343 /63520
- ^{1} French Land Register data, which excludes lakes, ponds, glaciers > 1 km^{2} (0.386 sq mi or 247 acres) and river estuaries.

Saint-Flour-l'Étang (French pronunciation: [sɛ̃ fluʁ letɑ̃]; before 2020: Saint-Flour; Auvergnat: Sant Flor) is a commune in the Puy-de-Dôme department in Auvergne-Rhône-Alpes in central France.

== See also ==
- Communes of the Puy-de-Dôme department
