= Xavier Beulin =

French businessperson and trade unionist (1958–2017)

- Born: 19 December 1958
- Died: 19 February 2017 (aged 58)
- Occupation: Businessman

Xavier Beulin (19 December 1958 – 19 February 2017) was a French agribusiness executive and lobbyist. He was the chairman of the Avril Group from 2000 to 2017, and chairman of the Fédération nationale des syndicats d'exploitants agricoles from 2010 to 2017.
