= Jean-Philippe Puig =

French businessman

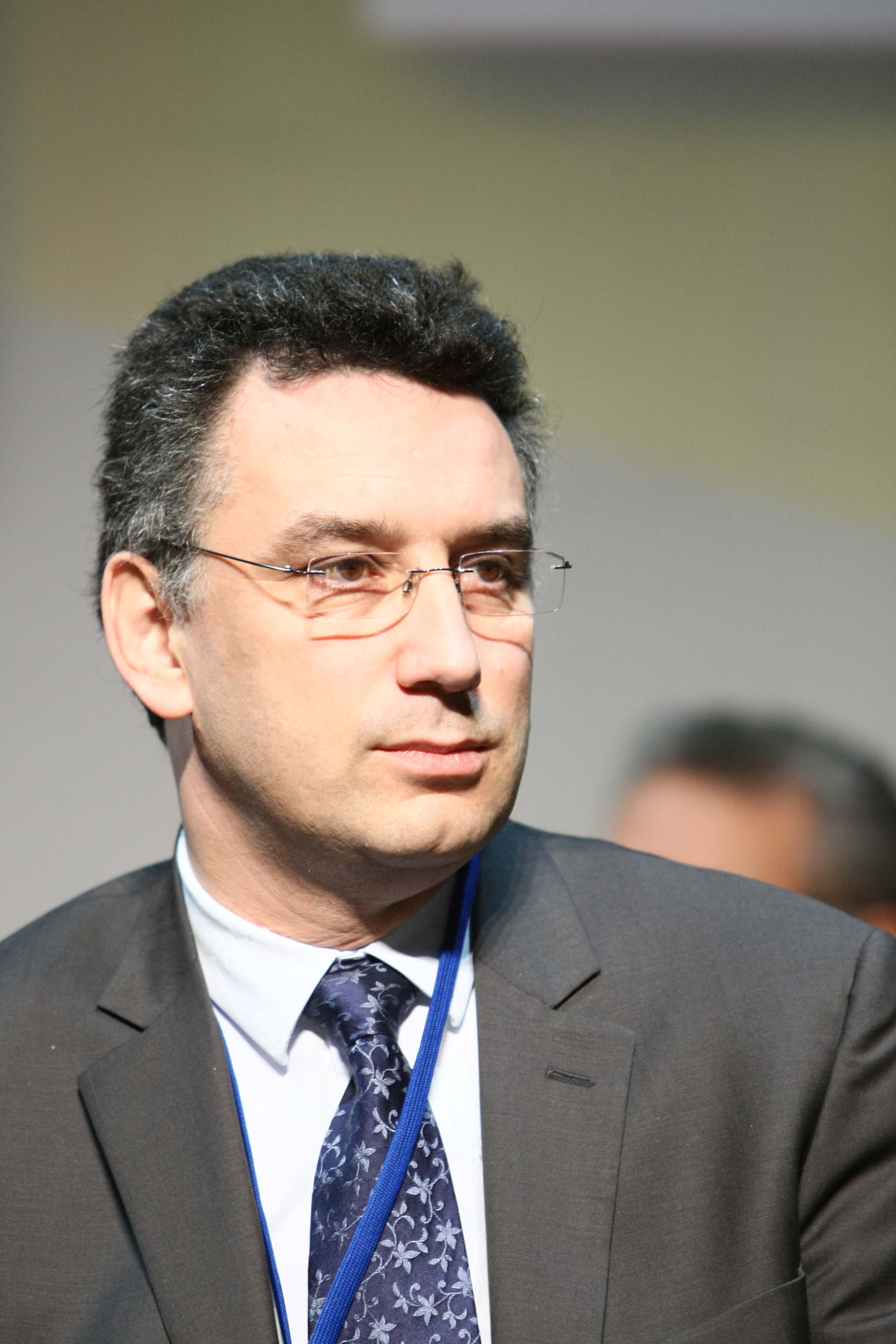
- Born: 18 January 1961 (age 65); France
- Education: Chimie ParisTech
- Occupation: Business executive
- Known for: CEO of Avril
- Children: 2

Jean-Philippe Puig (born 18 January 1961) is a French business executive and general director who has been the chief executive officer of Avril Group since 2012.

== Early life and education ==
Jean-Philippe Puig was born in France in 1961 and graduated from Chimie ParisTech in 1983.

== Career ==
Puig started in the aluminum industry, at the Research and Development division of Pechiney (French aluminum company). He occupied various positions at Pechiney: mining extraction, operations management, sales and international development, in different countries. He notably was plant manager in Delphi, Greece, and responsible for international development and financial control in Sydney. In 2003, he managed upstream activities of Pechiney.

In 2008, he was appointed Rio Tinto Alcan Group's chairman for Europe, Middle East and Africa, following the acquisition of Pechiney.

Puig joined Sofiproteol in 2012 as CEO, taking the position after Philippe Tillous-Borde's retirement. He operated a series of changes aiming at transforming a federation of small and medium businesses into an integrated food and agriculture company. Among these, he changed the governance of the company into a limited partnership with share capital ("société en commandite par actions"), an operation which allowed the distinction between the financial and industrial activities, and establish the farmers (oleaginous producers) at the heart of the governance.

The transformations came with a rebranding of the company: Sofiprotéol became Avril in January 2015.

Jean-Philippe Puig is a vocal defender of biofuels, and especially French biodiesel (Diester).

Following the Fipronil crisis, Jean-Philippe Puig defended the quality and food safety guarantees offered by the French production chain and called on transformers and distributors to give preference to French eggs.

In 2018, Jean-Philippe Puig emphasized that the Avril Group had been one of the first industrial groups to take a position opposed to the importation of palm oil in Europe. He recalled that "we have everything we need with colza oil and sunflower oil to make biofuel in Europe" without the need to import palm oil.

Facing the COVID-19 pandemic in France, Jean-Philippe Puig emphasized the Group's ability to adapt to the change in consumer behavior caused by the shift from eating out to eating at home. Regardless, the biofuels business faced a substantial economic impact from the pandemic. In spite of this crisis, the Avril Group has maintained its development plan and reiterated its continued investment in vegetable proteins.

In April 2022, during the presentation of the April Group's annual results, Jean-Philippe Puig announced his intention to increase its French sunflower processing capacity to more than one million tons of seeds, i.e. the Group will transform more than 50% of the French sunflower agricultural production.

== Other positions ==
Puig chairs the supervisory board of Agroinvest and CapAgro Innovation.

He is a member of "Cercle de l’industrie".

== Personal life ==
Jean-Philippe Puig plays the flute (he received the prize of the Aix-en-Provence Conservatoire), enjoys baroque music and admires Julien Gracq. He is married to a French teacher and has two children.
