= Farrow-to-finish =

Pig confinement operation

Farrow-to-finish is typically a confinement operation where pigs are bred and raised to their slaughter weight, usually 225–300 pounds. Facilities with a capacity of 2,500 or more swine are considered by the EPA to be concentrated animal feeding operations (CAFOs) subject to point source pollution permit requirements. Other types of hog operations include farrow-to-feeder pig, feeder pig-to-finish, weanling-to-feeder pig, and farrow-to-weanling.
