= Oleochemistry =

Study of vegetable oils and animal oils and fats

Oleochemistry is the study of vegetable oils and animal oils and fats, and oleochemicals derived from these fats and oils. The resulting product can be called oleochemicals (from Latin: oleum "olive oil"). The major product of this industry is soap, approximately 8.9 million tons of which were produced in 1990. Other major oleochemicals include fatty acids, fatty acid methyl esters, fatty alcohols and fatty amines. Glycerol is a side product of all of these processes. Intermediate chemical substances produced from these basic oleochemical substances include alcohol ethoxylates, alcohol sulfates, alcohol ether sulfates, quaternary ammonium salts, monoacylglycerols (MAG), diacylglycerols (DAG), structured triacylglycerols (TAG), sugar esters, and other oleochemical products.

As the price of crude oil rose in the late 1970s, manufacturers switched from petrochemicals to oleochemicals because plant-based lauric oils processed from palm kernel oil were cheaper. Since then, palm kernel oil is predominantly used in the production of laundry detergent and personal care items like toothpaste, soap bars, shower cream and shampoo.

== Processes ==
Important process in oleochemical manufacturing include hydrolysis and transesterification, among others.

=== Hydrolysis ===
The splitting (or hydrolysis) of the triglycerides produces fatty acids and glycerol follows this equation:

RCO_{2}CH_{2}–CHO_{2}CR–CH_{2}O_{2}CR + 3 H_{2}O → 3 RCOOH + HOCH_{2}–CHOH–CH_{2}OH

To this end, hydrolysis is conducted in water at 250 °C. The cleavage of triglycerides with base proceeds more quickly than hydrolysis, the process being saponification. Saponification however produces soap, whereas the desired product of hydrolysis are the fatty acids.

=== Transesterification ===
Fats react with alcohols (R'OH) instead of with water in hydrolysis in a process called transesterification. Glycerol is produced together with the fatty acid esters. Most typically, the reaction entails the use of methanol (MeOH) to give fatty acid methyl esters:

RCO_{2}CH_{2}–CHO_{2}CR–CH_{2}O_{2}CR + 3 MeOH → 3 RCO_{2}Me + HOCH_{2}–CHOH–CH_{2}OH

FAMEs are less viscous than the precursor fats and can be purified to give the individual fatty acid esters, e.g. methyl oleate vs methyl palmitate.

=== Hydrogenation ===
The fatty acid or fatty esters are susceptible to hydrogenation converts unsaturated fatty acids into saturated fatty acids. The acids or esters can also be reduced to the fatty alcohols. For some applications, fatty acids are converted to fatty nitriles. Hydrogenated of these nitriles gives fatty amines, which have a variety of applications.

=== Gelation ===
Liquid oil can also be immobilized in a 3D-network provided by various molecules called oleogelators.

== Applications ==
The largest application for oleochemicals, about 30% of market share for fatty acids and 55% for fatty alcohols, is for making soaps and detergents. Lauric acid is used to produce sodium lauryl sulfate and related compounds, which are used to make soaps and other personal care products.

Other applications of oleochemicals include the production of lubricants, solvents, biodiesel and bioplastics. Due to the use of methyl esters in biodiesel production, they represent the fastest growing sub-sector of oleochemical production in recent years.

== Oleochemical industry development ==
=== Europe ===
Through the 1996 creation of Novance and the 2008 acquisition of Oleon, Avril Group has dominated the European market of oleochemistry.

=== Southeast Asia ===
Southeast Asian countries' rapid production growth of palm oil and palm kernel oil in the 1980s spurred the oleochemical industry in Malaysia, Indonesia, and Thailand. Many oleochemical plants were built. Though a nascent and small industry when pitted against big detergent giants in the US and Europe, oleochemical companies in southeast Asia had competitive edge in cheap ingredients. The US fatty chemical industry found it difficult to consistently maintain acceptable levels of profits. Competition was intense with market shares divided among many companies there where neither imports nor exports played a significant role. By the late 1990s, giants like Henkel, Unilever, and Petrofina sold their oleochemical factories to focus on higher profit activities like retail of consumer goods. Since the Europe outbreak of 'mad cow disease' (or bovine spongiform encephalopathy) in 2000, tallow is replaced for many uses by vegetable oleic fatty acids, such as palm kernel and coconut oils.
