= Field bean =

Field bean is a general term for several plants found growing within fields or shrubbery and may refer to:

- Lablab purpureus (the hyacinth bean)
- Phaseolus vulgaris (the string bean)
- Vicia faba (the broad bean)
