= Lesieur =

Lesieur is a last name, and may refer to:

- Art Lesieur (1907–1967), American ice hockey player
- Émile Lesieur (1885–1985), French rugby player
- Eugène Lesieur (1890–1975), French wrestler
- Jean-Pierre Lesieur (born 1935), French poet
- Georges Lesieur (1848–1931), French businessman
- Marie Lesieur (1799–1890), known as Marie Lesueur, French ballet dancer
- Stephen Lesieur, Swiss-born English diplomat
