= Lycée Galilée =

Lycée Galilée may refer to:

- Lycée Galilée - Cergy - In the Paris metropolitan area
- Lycée Galilée with a bilingual French-German section - Combs-la-Ville - In the Paris metropolitan area
- Lycée Galilée - Franqueville-Saint-Pierre
- Lycée Galilée - Gennevilliers - In the Paris metropolitan area
- Lycée Galilée - Guérande
- Lycée Galilée - Vienne
