= Quiggin's =

Confectionery company

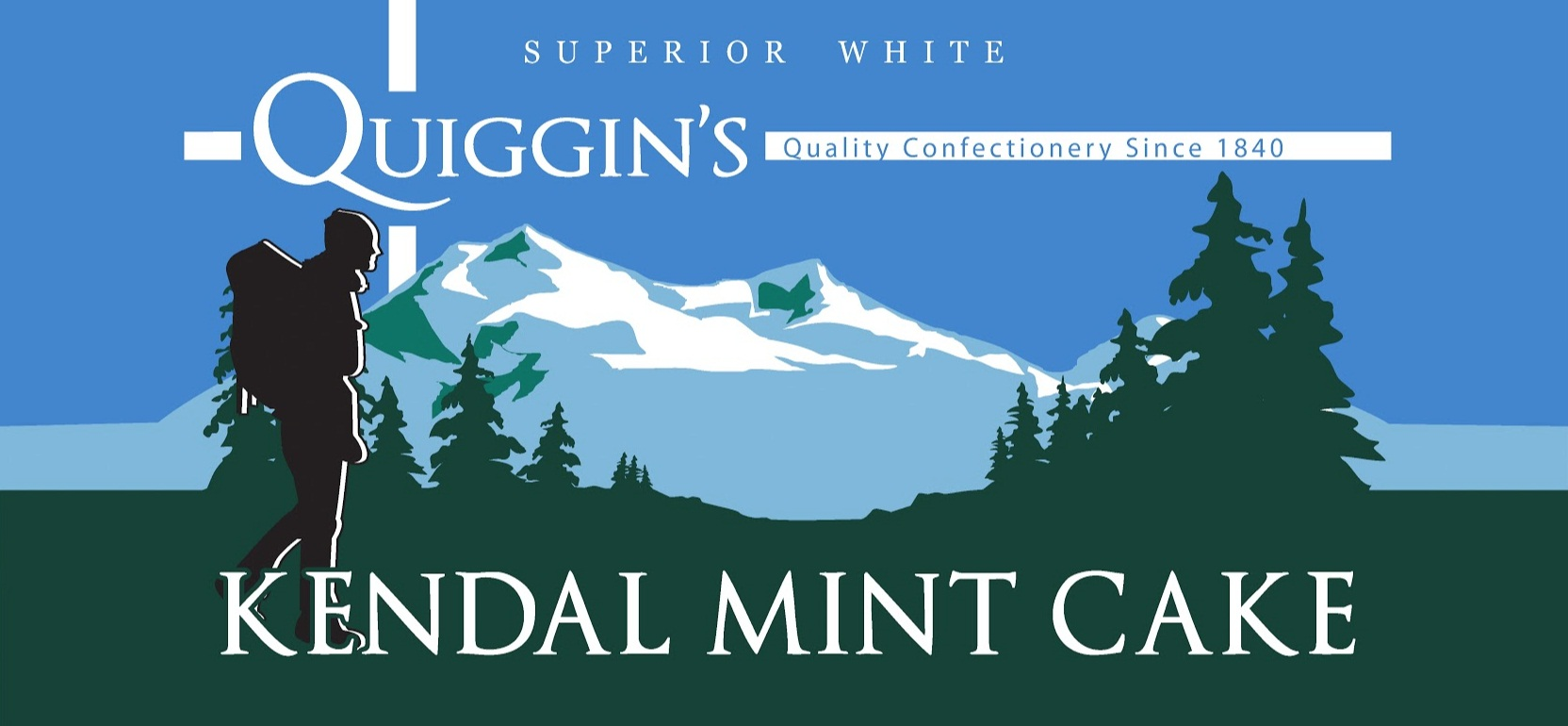
Quiggin's Kendal Mint Cake packaging as of 2020

Quiggin's is a British confectionery producer based in Kendal, Cumbria, and the oldest surviving manufacturer of Kendal Mint Cake. It is also one of only three manufacturers of this confection, the others being Romney's and Wilson's.

== History ==
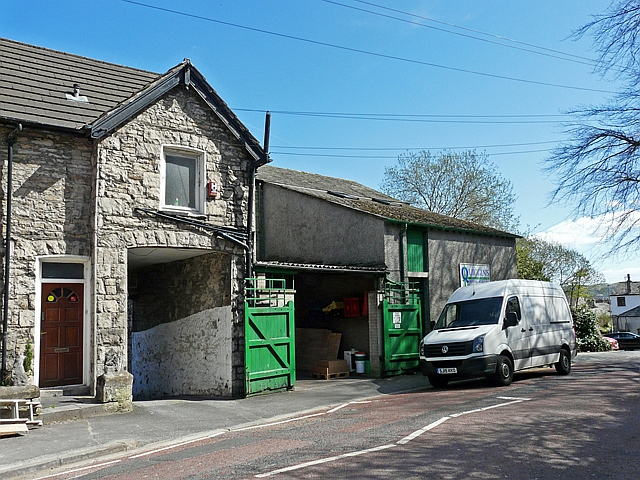
Quiggin's factory, Kendal, Cumbria, UK

The "Quiggin's Confectionery Company" was founded in 1840 on the Isle of Man by William Quiggin, and sold confections such as coconut ice and bullseyes. In 1847, Queen Victoria and Prince Albert visited Ramsey, and were greeted by William Quiggin, whose daughter presented Albert with a stick of rock with the words "Welcome Prince Albert to Mona" along with the Manx triskelion throughout its centre, and is regarded by some as the first lettered rock.

In 1872 Daniel, William's son, moved to Kendal and began his own confectionery company, the company today known as Quiggin's. Manufacture of Kendal Mint Cake began soon after (although the product was invented by Wiper's in 1869).

In 1975 Quiggin's became the first to cover their mint cake in chocolate, and the same year, Sir Chris Bonington took Quiggin's Kendal Mint Cake on his ascent of Mount Everest.

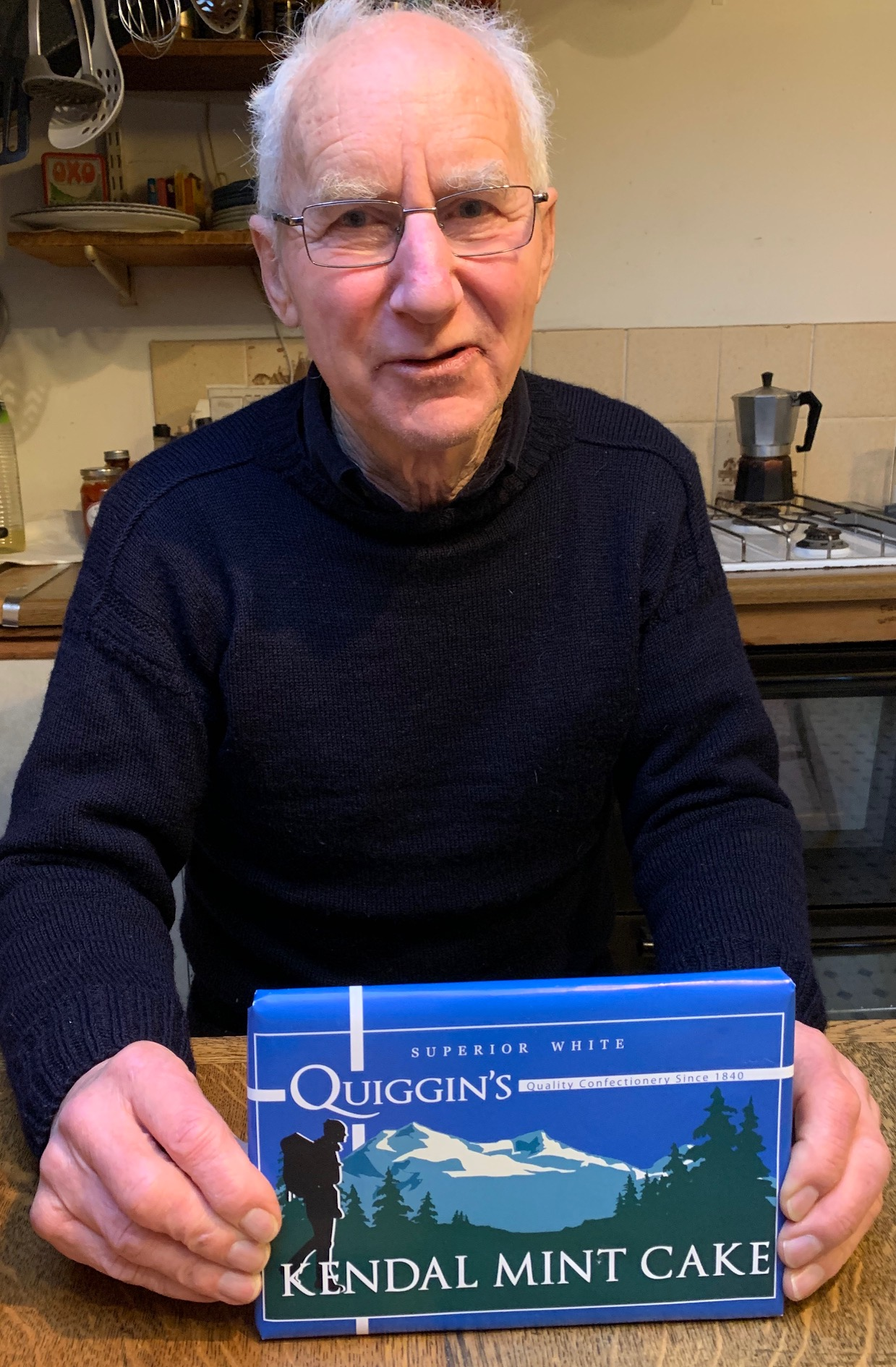
Quiggins's was a sponsor of the 1990 International Trans-Antarctica Expedition, the first to cross Antarctica on foot (pictured: Geoff Somers MBE)

Quiggin's Kendal Mint Cake accompanied the first successful non-mechanised Trans-Antarctic Expedition in 1990.
