= Institute for the History of Aluminium =

The Institute for the History of Aluminium (French: Institut pour l'histoire de l'aluminium) is a French non-profit organisation. Founded in 1986, its aims are to foster multidisciplinary study of the history of aluminium in its technical, economic, industrial, commercial and cultural aspects and to protect the aluminium industry's heritage.

The IHA publishes the Cahiers d'histoire de l'aluminium and an electronic newsletter. It provides support for students who are interested in the history of aluminium through research grants. Access to its specialised library and archives is open to researchers in the reading room of the IHA in Gennevilliers.
