= Tara expedition =

Oceanic research expeditions

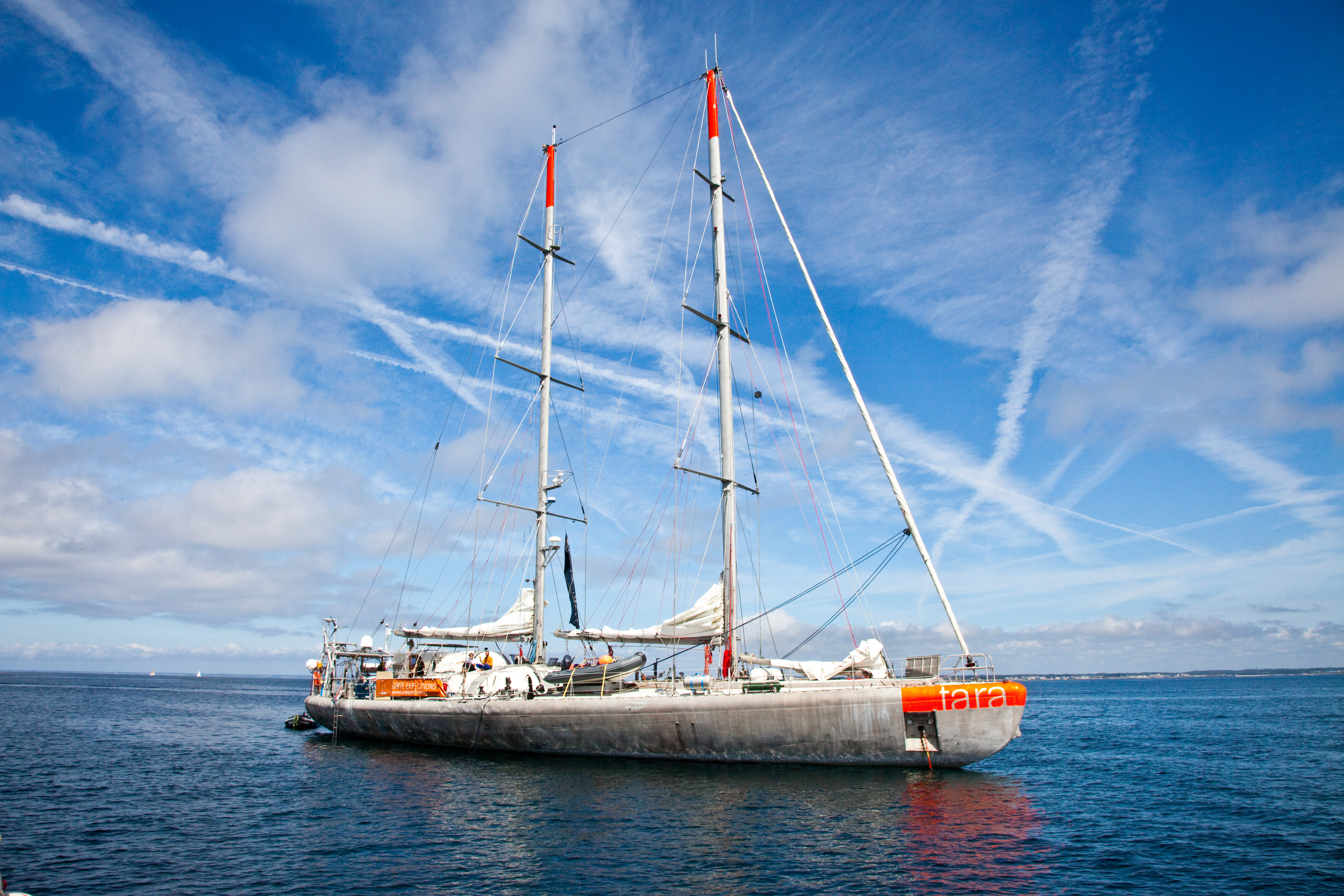
- Schooner Tara.

History

France
- Name: Antarctica; then Seamaster; currently Tara
- Builder: SFCN Villeneuve-la-Garenne
- In service: 1989
- Home port: Lorient, France

General characteristics
- Type: Schooner
- Displacement: 130 t (130 long tons; 290,000 lb)
- Length: 36 m (118 ft)

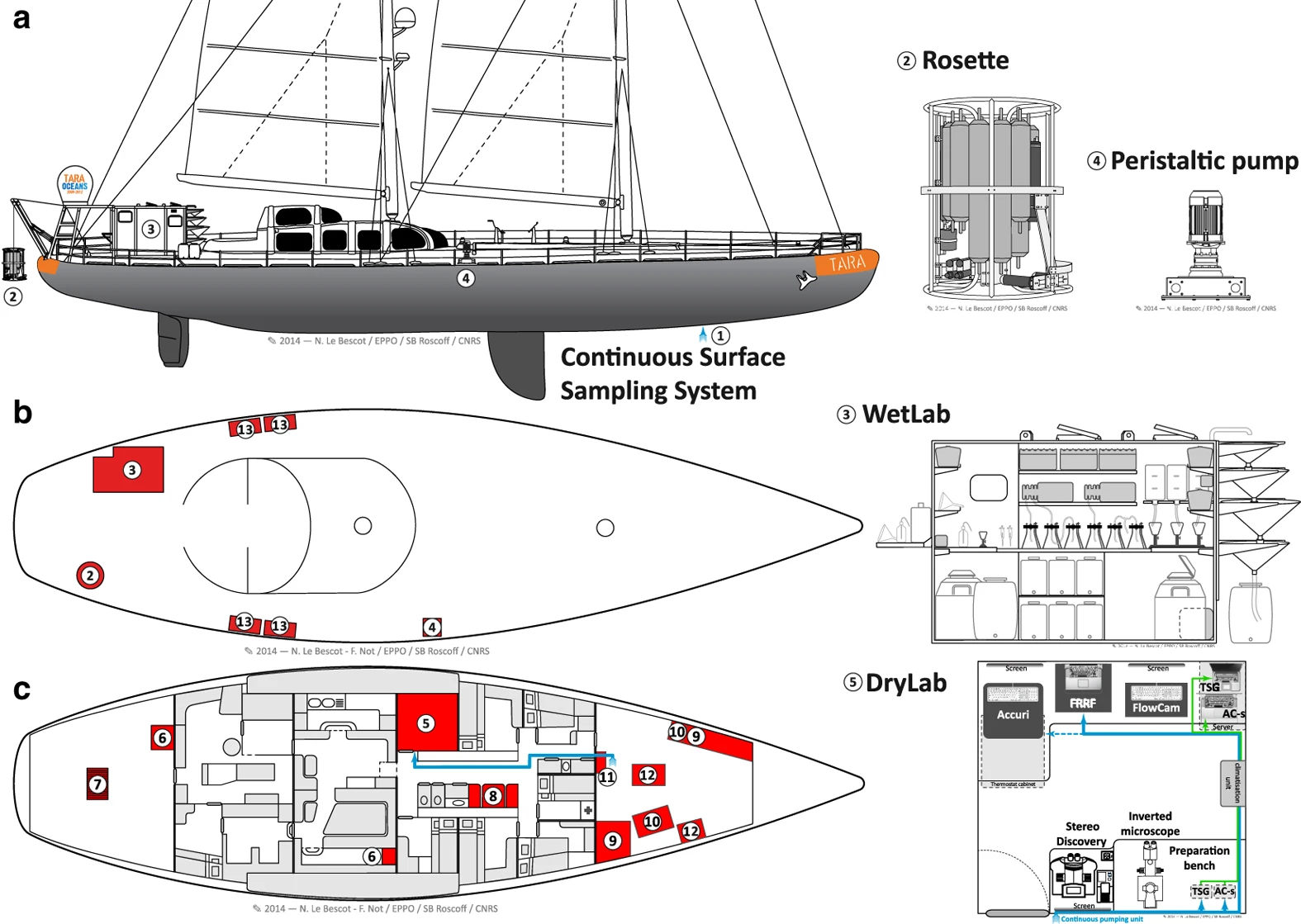
Sampling devices and working areas on-board SV Tara are shown from the vessel's [a] side-view, [b] bird's-eye-view of the deck, and [c] inside-view. They consist of the [1] Continuous Surface Sampling System [CSSS]; [2] Rosette Vertical Sampling System [RVSS]; [3] wet lab and storage in liquid nitrogen; [4] High Volume Peristaltic pump [HVP-PUMP]; [5] dry lab; [6] oceanography engineers data acquisition and processing area; [7] winch; [8] video imaging area; [9] storage areas at room temperature; [10] storage areas at +4 °C and −20 °C; [11] MilliQ water system and AC-s system; [12] diving equipment, flowcytobot and ALPHA instruments; and [13] storage boxes. The flow of seawater from the continuous surface sampling system to the dry lab is shown in blue. Courtesy of the Tara Oceans Expedition

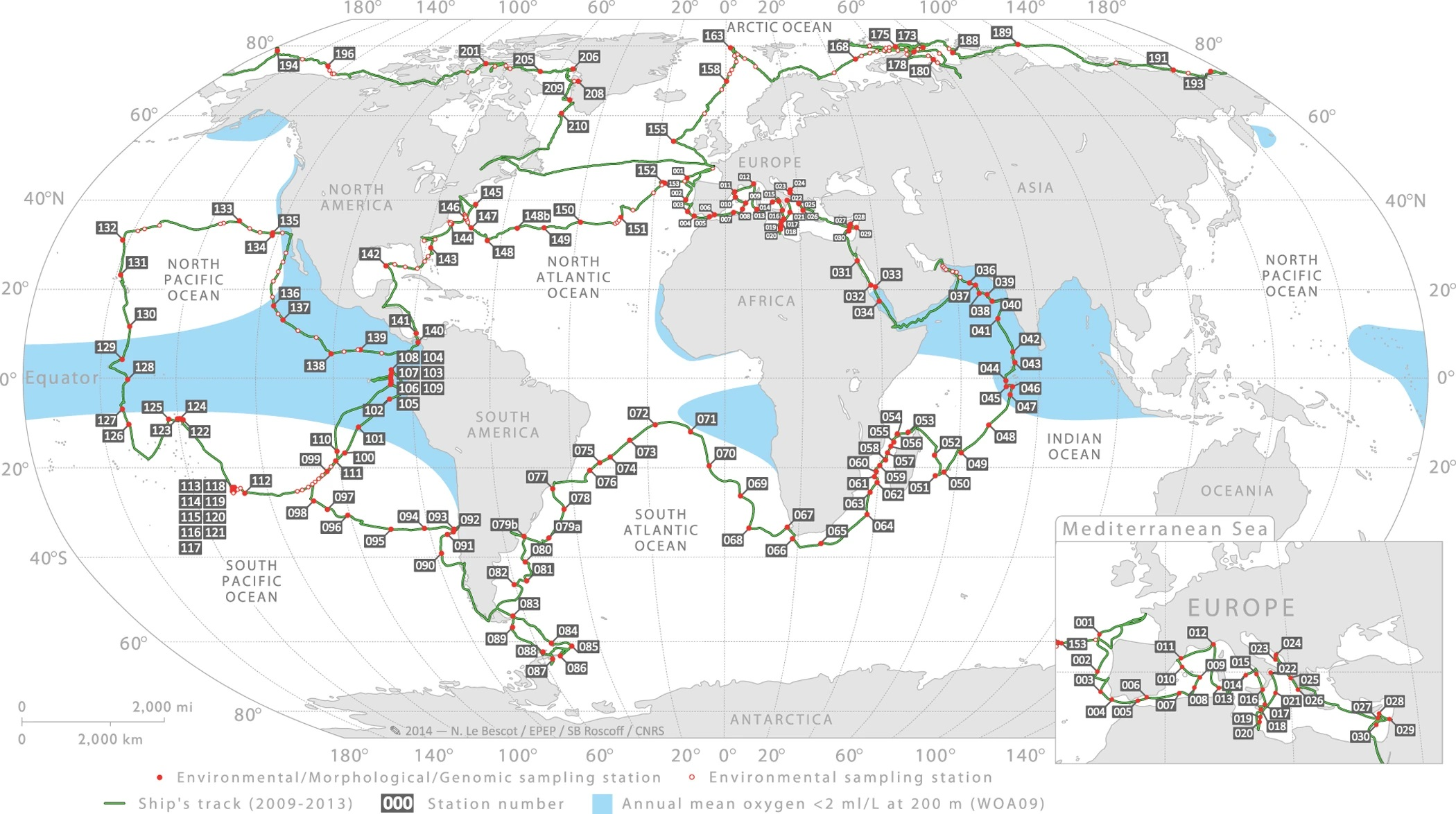
Sampling route of the Tara Oceans Expedition (green track), showing station labels and areas (blue shade) where the annual mean oxygen concentration is <2 mL/L (WOA09), usually corresponding also to high CO2 concentration and low pH.

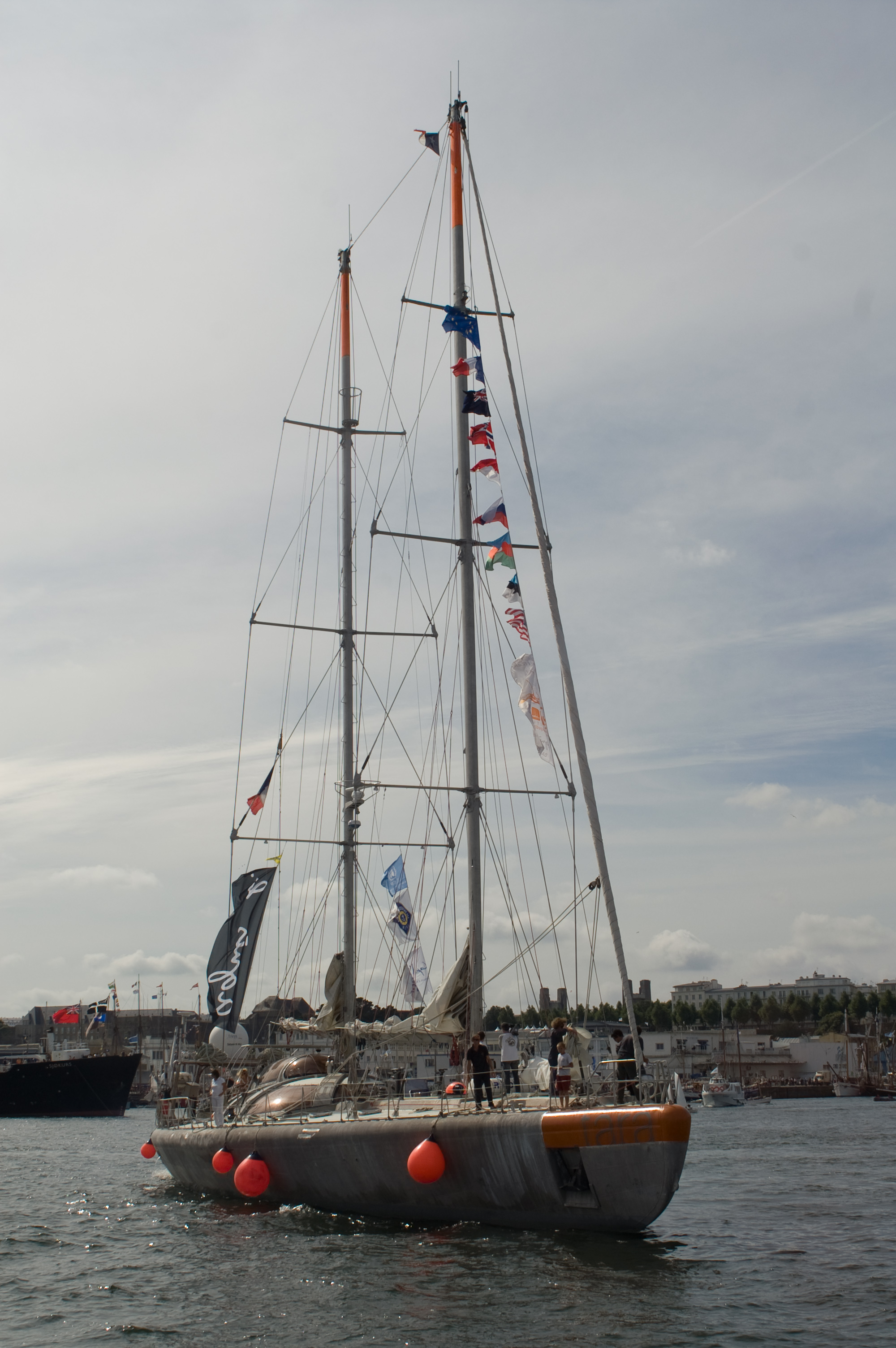
Schooner Tara in Brest Harbour.

Tara is a French sailing ship used in a series of oceanic research expeditions.

== The boat ==
Tara is a 36-metre (118 ft) aluminum-hulled schooner, formerly named Antarctica and then Seamaster.

Designed by the naval architects Olivier Petit and Luc Bouvet, built in France on the initiative of Jean-Louis Étienne, doctor and explorer, in 1989. The schooner Antarctica was used from 1991 to 1996 by Jean-Louis Étienne for scientific expeditions in Antarctica, at the Erebus volcano and then wintering at Spitzberg.

Under its former name Seamaster, it was owned by Peter Blake, who was shot and killed in 2001 by pirates while sailing Seamaster on the Amazon River. Following Blake's death, the yacht was bought by Etienne Bourgois, renamed Tara and dedicated to environmental expeditions.

== Expeditions ==
=== Tara Arctic ===
The polar schooner Tara set out to drift in the ice for approximately two years from its first departure, late in August 2006. The expedition met with interest in the oceanography community, especially in the context of the International Polar Year (2007–2008). Dubbed Tara Arctic, this voyage ended on February 23, 2008. It was part of the international DAMOCLES (Developing Arctic Modelling and Observing Capabilities for Long-term Environmental Studies) program.

=== Tara Oceans ===
In 2009, Tara started a new expedition, dubbed Tara Oceans. It travelled around the world until 2013 to study CO_{2} capture by marine microorganisms such as plankton on a global scale. The costs of the expedition were €3 million per year, all from private funds. The expedition was primarily funded by the French fashion designer agnès b., however, it was a collaborative effort between the Tara Expeditions Foundation, the French National Center for Scientific Research (CNRS) and 17 other international partner institutions. It was able to collect more than 35,000 planktonic samples from 210 stations in every major oceanic region, which through analyses revealed more than 40 million genes, most of which were new to science.

The samples were analyzed using a combination of DNA sequencing and microscopy. Of the 40+ million genes identified, the two biggest match domains were 58.8% bacteria and 5.4% viruses. 27.7% were not able to be matched with any currently known domains of life. This fact underscores the vast unknown biological components of the world's oceans.

In addition to uncovering unknown marine biodiversity, the Tara Oceans Expedition provided information on the role of marine microbes in the global ecosystem, address the impacts of climate change on marine life and improve ocean conservation efforts.

One of the other goals of Tara Oceans was to allow open access archives of both raw and validated data sets to scientists around the world as quickly as possible. Links to all of the data sets can be found at https://www.ebi.ac.uk/services/tara-oceans-data. As part of the expedition's public outreach efforts, a short series of documentary videos called The Plankton Chronicles which merged science and art was created by the Villefranche-sur-Mer Marine Station.

=== Tara Mediterranean ===
Tara Mediterranean was the next expedition that took place over seven months in 2014. It traversed the entire Mediterranean Sea with the goal better understanding the sources, transport, distribution and characteristics of surface floating plastic. One of the major discoveries was that of the 2000 samples taken on the cruise at 300 different sites, all of the samples contained plastic fragments.

=== Tara Pacific ===
Tara Pacific began in May 2016. During this latest voyage Tara studied coral reefs and plastic pollution.

=== Tara Microbiomes ===
Between 2020 and 2023, Tara traveled the South Atlantic, along the coasts of South America and West Africa, and as far as Antarctica, to study the ocean microbiome and its interactions with the climate and pollution. The Microbiome Mission has been endorsed by the UNESCO Oceanographic Commission for contributing to the UN Decade of Ocean Science for Sustainable Development.

== See also ==
- Tara Polar Station
- Fram (ship)
- Arctic exploration
- MOSAiC Expedition
- Surface Heat Budget of the Arctic Ocean (SHEBA) expedition
