= Hôtel de Ville, Villeneuve-la-Garenne =

Town hall in Villeneuve-la-Garenne, France

Hôtel de Ville
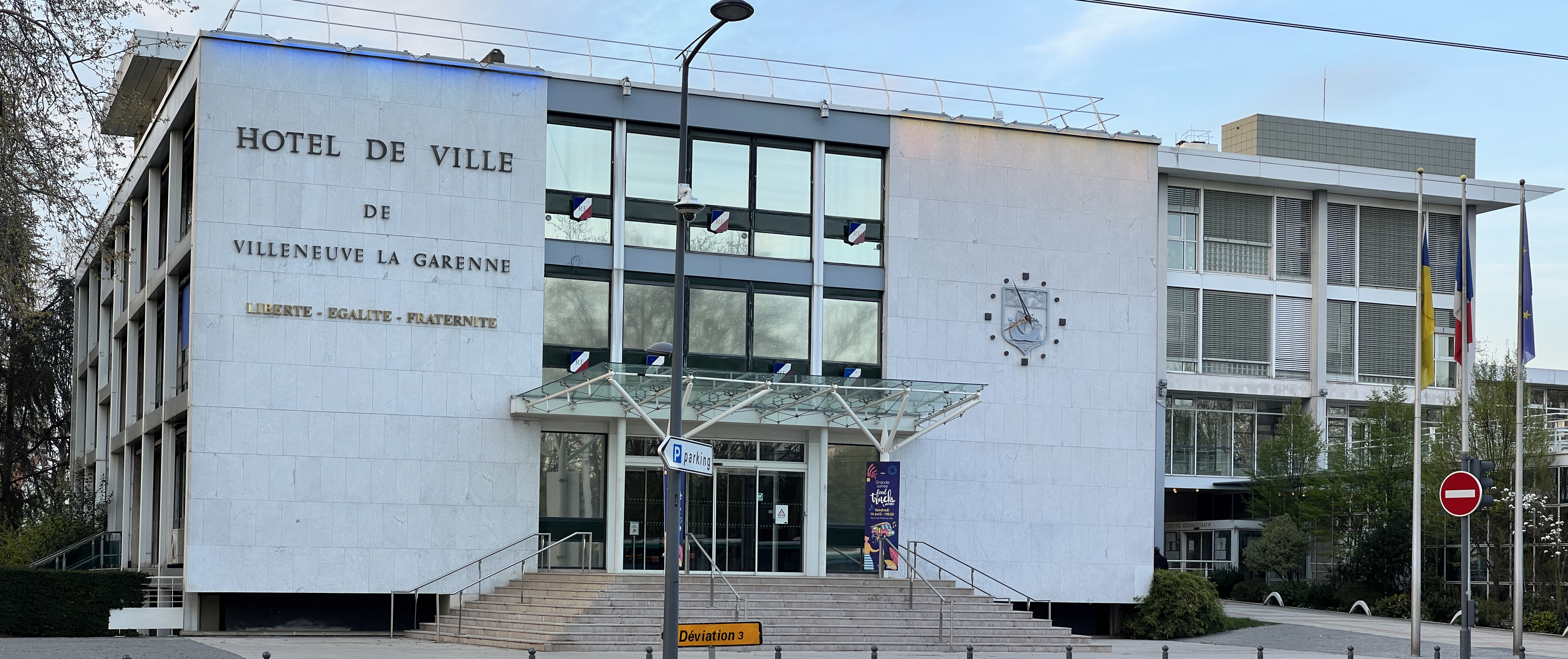
- The main frontage of the Hôtel de Ville in April 2023
- Interactive map of the Hôtel de Ville area

General information
- Type: City hall
- Architectural style: Modern style
- Location: Villeneuve-la-Garenne, France
- Coordinates: 48.9359°N 2.3331°E
- Completed: 1965

Design and construction
- Architect: Gaston Appert

The Hôtel de Ville (French pronunciation: [otɛl də vil], City Hall) is a municipal building in Villeneuve-la-Garenne, Hauts-de-Seine, in the northern suburbs of Paris, standing on Avenue de Verdun.

== History ==
After the commune of Villeneuve-la-Garenne was created by detaching its territory from the commune of Gennevilliers on 9 April 1929, the new town council led by the mayor, Homère Robert, decided to acquire a suitable building for municipal use. The search was simplified by the fact that an opera singer, Élisabeth Dupont du Chambon, who was a staunch supported of the independence of the commune had bequeathed FFr100,000 and two houses to the commune when she died in 1909. In accordance with her wishes, her home at No. 23 Quai d'Asnières was allocated for use as a cultural centre, now known as the Centre Culturel Max Juclier, and the other property on the north side of Avenue de Verdun, was allocated for use as the town hall.

The building on Avenue de Verdun was designed in the neoclassical style and built in ashlar stone. The design involved a symmetrical main frontage of five bays facing onto the street with the end bays projected forward. The central bay featured a small porch with a pediment on the ground floor, tall casement windows on the first and second floors and an open pediment above, with a clock in the tympanum. The other bays were fenestrated in a similar style.

In the early 1960s, following significant population growth, the council led by the mayor, Roger Prévot, decided to demolish the old town hall and to erect a modern building on the same site. After the demolition of the old building had been completed, construction of the new building started in 1963. The new building was designed in the modern style, built in concrete and glass and was officially opened by the prefect of Hauts-de-Seine, Claude Boitel, on 20 February 1965.

The original design involved a symmetrical main frontage of three bays facing onto the street (the left-hand section of the current complex). It featured a flight of steps leading up to a three-storey glass frontage flanked by blind concrete walls, which bore the inscription "Hôtel de Ville" de Villeneuve-la-Garenne on the left, and a clock, superimposed on the town's coat of arms, on the right. Internally, the principal room was the Salle du Conseil (council chamber).

In the early 1990s, the complex was extended to the east to create an administration centre, based on a design by Bernard Simon and Pascal Guerrier. The extension consisted of a new two-storey office block which was also projected forward and connected to the original structure by a four-storey steel and glass bridge. An extensive programme of works to refurbish the administrative centre was initiated in May 2025.
