= Jean-Louis Étienne =

French doctor, explorer and scientist

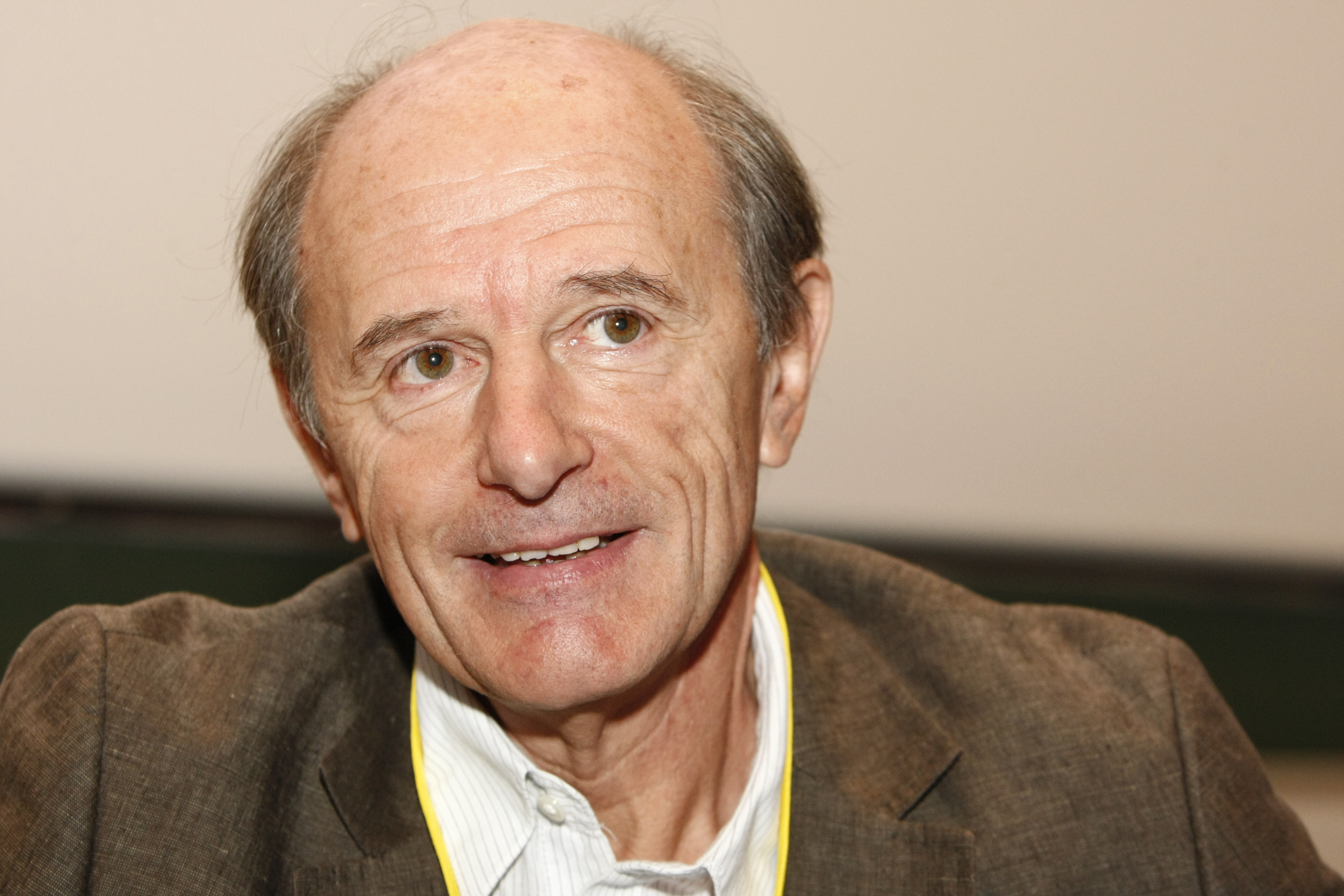
- Jean-Louis Étienne in 2008.
- Born: 9 December 1946 (age 79); Vielmur-sur-Agout, Tarn, France
- Occupations: Doctor, explorer, scientist
- Known for: Arctic and Antarctic explorations 1990 International Trans-Antarctica Expedition

Jean-Louis Étienne (born 9 December 1946) is a French doctor, explorer and scientist. He is well known for his Arctic explorations, where he was the first man to reach the North Pole alone in 1986, and his Antarctic explorations, including the famous 1990 International Trans-Antarctica Expedition.

== Early life and education ==
Jean-Louis Étienne was born in Vielmur-sur-Agout in the department of Tarn. He studied at the technical high school of Mazamet where he graduated with a CAP (Certificat d'Aptitude Professionnelle) in machining, then his technical high school graduation in Castres, and at the Faculté de Médecine of the Paul Sabatier University of Toulouse.

He obtained a doctorate in general medicine graduated with a DESS (Diplôme d'Études Supérieures Spécialisées) in Dietetics and food, as well as a diploma in biology and sports medicine. Jean-Louis Étienne is also a licensed doctor of the Merchant navy.

== Career as explorer ==
Jean-Louis Étienne got interested in medical matters and human psychology in extreme conditions. In order to further his research, he participated in several expeditions in Himalaya (Broad Peak and North of Mount Everest), Greenland and Patagonia. He was a teammate on the Pen Duick VI under Éric Tabarly for its race around the world in 1977–78.

He is well known for his expeditions in the Arctic and Antarctica, with scientific as well as pedagogical goals, which attracted media coverage, disseminating knowledge and research, and promoting protection of the environment. He became famous with the feat of the 1990 International Trans-Antarctica Expedition, a 6,300 km crossing on foot, with dogs, of the Austral continent.

In 2007 and 2008, Jean-Louis Étienne was the general director of the Institut océanographique de Paris and the Oceanographic Museum of Monaco.

== List of expeditions ==
- March–April 1986 : he was the first to reach the North Pole, with continuing aerial resupply, skiing solo for 63 days.
- July 1989–March 1990 : co-leader with Will Steger of the International Trans-Antarctica Expedition, a seven-month expedition during Austral summer, where he and four other men of different nationalities (Russian, Chinese, Japanese and English), fully crossed with their dogs and sleighs, the 6,300 km of the Antarctic continent, on the geographical South Pole.
- 1991–96 : on the schooner Antarctica (currently the Tara), he led scientific expeditions to Antarctica and Spitsbergen.
- April–July 2002 : the Mission Banquise on the Polar Observer drifted for three months near the North Pole to study global warming.
- January–April 2005 : Clipperton expedition on the Clipperton Island in the Pacific Ocean to establish an inventory of biodiversity.
- April 2007–March 2008 : Total Pole Airship, a scientific expedition to measure the thickness of the floe of the Arctic Ocean, via the geographic North Pole, for the International Polar Year. The accident of the airship on 22 January 2008, which broke its moorings after strong wind gusts, forced Jean-Louis Étienne to announce that the expedition could not take place in 2008.
- April 2010 : first crossing of the Arctic Ocean in a rozière balloon, which started in Spitsbergen. Jean-Louis Étienne landed in Eastern Siberia after a flight alone in 5 days 2 hours 15 min and a path of 3,160 km.

== Honours ==
Jean-Louis Étienne was named Officer of the Legion of Honour in 2007, after being named Chevalier, then Commander in 2016 and Grand Officer in 2020. He was also named Chevalier of the National Order of Merit in 1991 and Chevalier of the Ordre des Palmes Académiques. He received the gold medal from the Société de géographie and is a member of the French Academy of Technologies. He also received two prizes from the French Academy of Sports in 1990 for his scientific and sport achievements.

== Publications ==
- Médecine et sport de montagne, éditions Favre (1983)
- Le Marcheur du pôle, éditions Robert Laffont (1986)
- Transantarctica, éditions Robert Laffont (1990)
- Pôle Sud, éditions L'Esprit du Temps (1991)
- Les Pôles, éditions Flammarion (1992)
- Antarctica, éditions Gallimard (1992)
- Expédition Erebus, éditions Arthaud (1994)
- Le Pôle intérieur, éditions Hoëbeke (1999)
- La Complainte de l'ours, éditions Jean-Claude Lattès (2001)
- Mission banquise, aux éditions du Seuil / 7^{e} Continent (2002)
- Médecine des randonnées extrêmes : des pôles aux plus hauts sommets, aux éditions du Seuil / 7^{e} Continent (2004)
- Clipperton, l'atoll du bout du monde, éditions du Seuil / Septième Continent (2005)
- Jean-Louis Étienne, 30 ans d'expéditions, éditions du Chêne (2009)
- La Traversée du pôle Nord en ballon, éditions du Chêne (2010)
- Nouvelles Histoires naturelles, éditions Jean-Claude Lattès (2011)

== Documentary films ==
- Erebus : la mer, la glace, le feu by Pierre-Antoine Hiroz, Gedeon Programmes productions, FR3 (1994)
- Nuit blanche sur la banquise by Marc Jampolsky, Gedeon Programmes productions, France 3 (1997)
- Le Monde d'Étienne by Olivier Julien, Gedeon Programmes productions, La Cinquième (2002)
- Le Pôle intérieur by Emilio Maillé, Gedeon Programmes productions, France 3 (2003)
- Les Mystères de Clipperton by Luc Marescot, Gedeon Programmes productions, Canal+ (2005)

== See also ==
- List of French explorers
