= Jeanine Claes =

French artist and dancer (1947–2019)

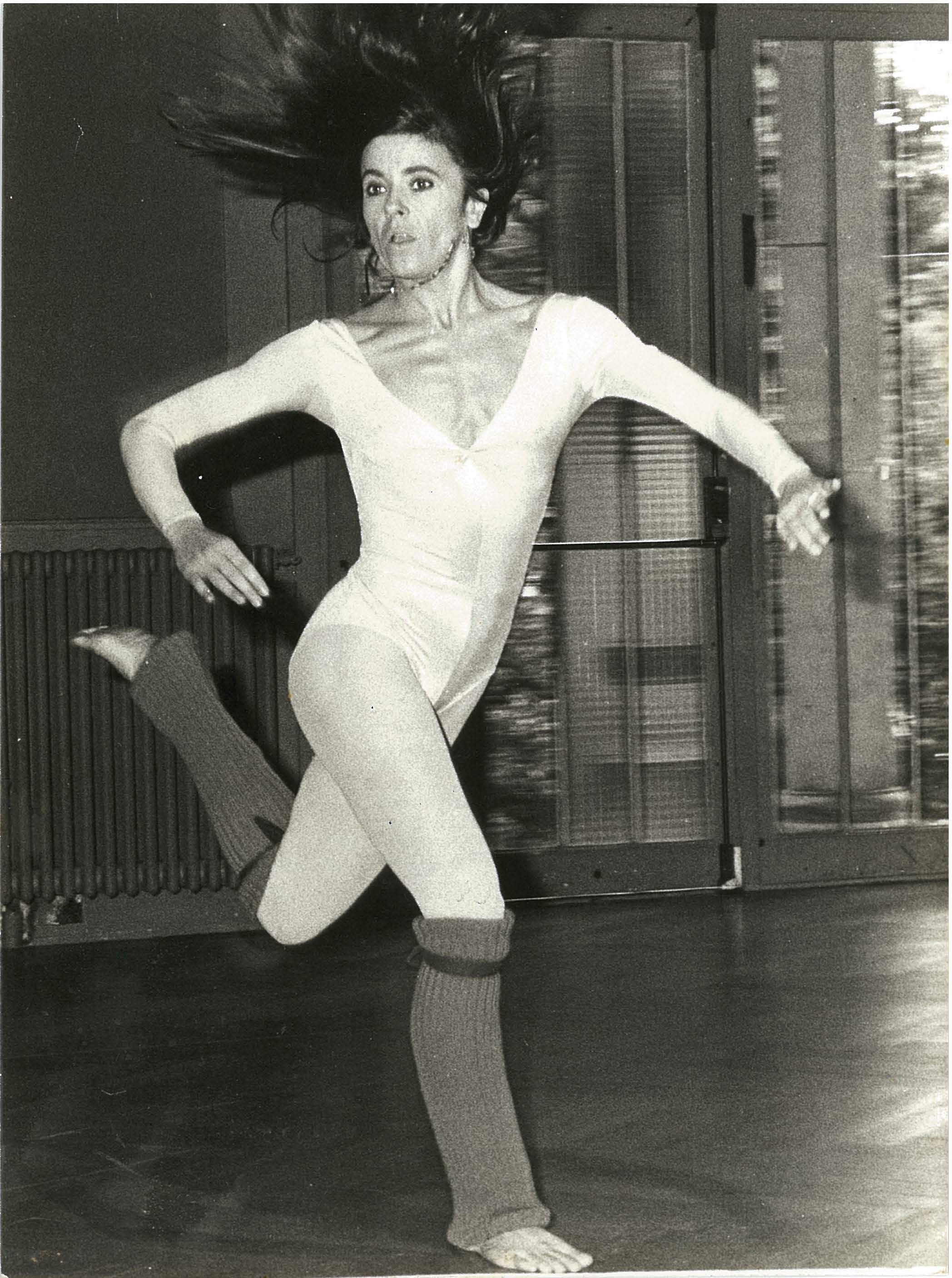
- Collection Jeanine Claes
- Born: 5 September 1947; Clichy, France
- Died: 18 October 2019 (aged 72); Hobart, Tasmania
- Occupations: Artist, dancer, choreographer, dance teacher

Jeanine Claes (1947–2019), nicknamed "l'Africaine", was a French artist, dancer, choreographer and teacher from the Fédération Française de Danse. She was born on 5 September 1947 at Clichy and died on 18 October 2019 in Hobart, Tasmania, Australia).

At the beginning of the seventies, at the American Center she established a class of African dance expression where, barefoot, she was accompanied by drummers from various backgrounds.

== Biography ==
=== Early years (1947–1978) ===
Born among nine siblings and growing up in a two bedrooms flat rooted in a no man's land on the outskirt of Paris (the Gennevilliers suburb), straight away her life started under a sign of chaos and movement. As a 3-year-old, she began classical dancing classes, which she later viewed as an act of faith but also an act of permanent fight. Nine years later, she was running the dance class! Despite her young age, the dancing industry wanted her to be upgraded to enter l’École des Professeurs de Danse d’Irène Popard two years earlier. But she chose to keep on studying at college and later on registered at l’École Supérieure d’Études Chorégraphiques (in Paris) where she studied modern dance, rhythmic dance and jazz dance. After that she went to university to do a course in psycho-motricity at Paris V-René Descartes while working with handicapped children of Gennevilliers.

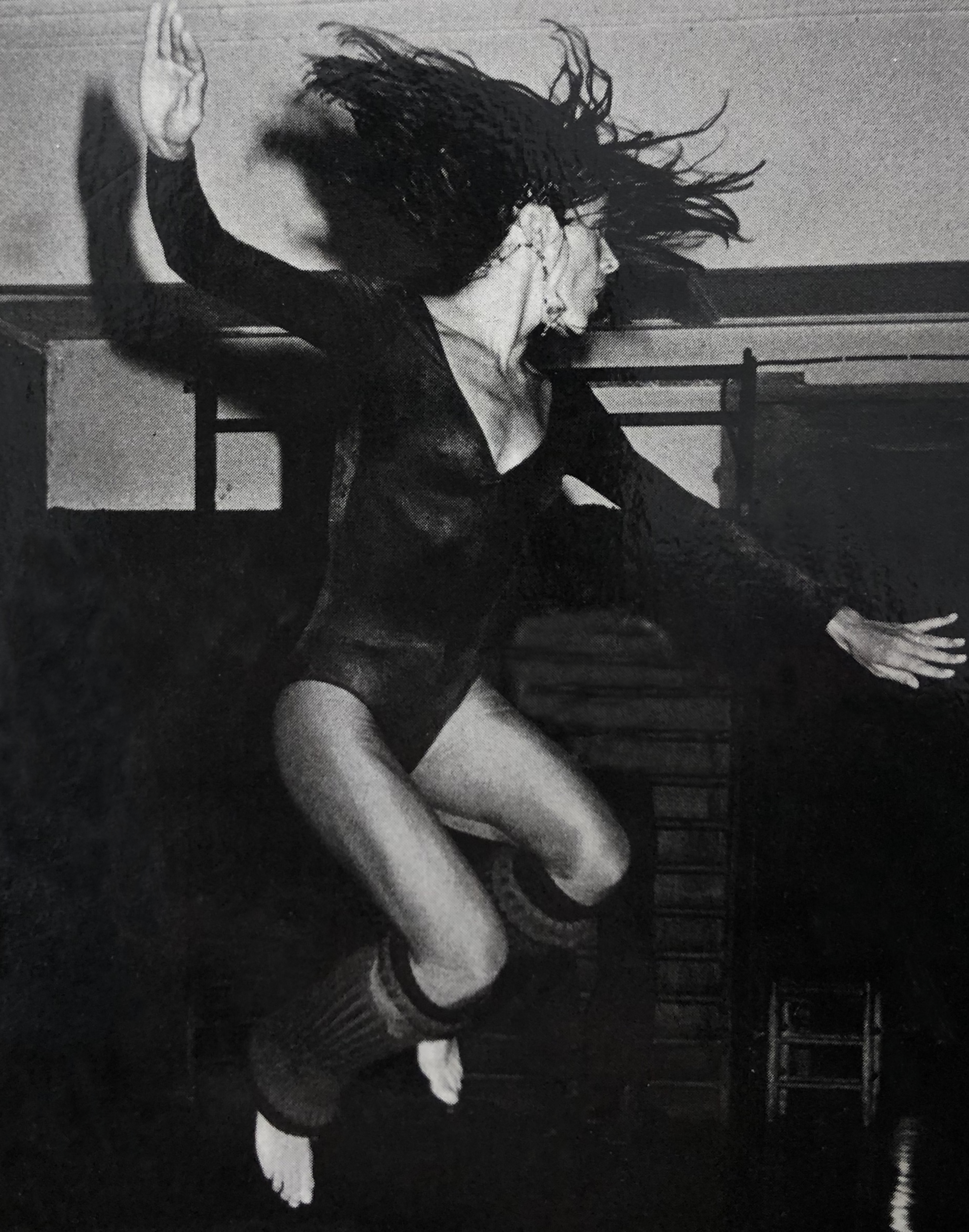
Collection Jeanine Claes

While studying, she was still not sure about pursuing a career in classical dance. : how could she free herself from the rigidity of an anti-natural environment where she could not even express all the rage within her since childhood? Despite her doubts, she still taught dancing and tried working experience with the delinquents from Colombes. In May 1968, as a 20 years old, when the factory workers locked themselves in their factories of the ceinture rouge, escorted by her group of delinquents, she managed to get the doors unlocked so she could perform a live dance show. A dance for the Others, and never solitary.

Still looking desperately for some pure energy, she kept on working alone on her own rhythms, her own steps. Then she came across the Haitian dancer Herns Duplan, a Katherine Dunham’s student, and his class of primitive expression. Finally, she had found her way, symbolic of an urgent organic need. Born again in dancing she now was able to not only express her emotions but also to exorcise her personal demons. At the American Center her class, like her company was named Rythme et Danse. Talking about it, the dancing experts say that her class looked very much like African dance but Jeanine Claes did not know it as she never set foot in Africa. At the same time she started a five years relationship with the drummer Guem. A relationship in the name of the love of dance and music. Thanks to her, in the process, Guem made a name for himself. The cult song Le Serpent is fruit of their relationship and based on the way she moved on stage. Ré-mastered in 1996 for the French TV show Ça se discute, this jingle showed Guem to the mainstream public except that the drummer forgot to mention that this song was first written with and for Jeanine Claes's dancing.

At that time, Jeanine's dancing reached another level, as much as in density as on a technical ground. Escaping the dictates of the President Sékou Touré en Guinée-Conakry, les Grands ballets d’Afrique Noire lived nearly on the streets in the quartier latin, in Paris. When its members discovered Jeanine Claes, they could not believe it – she danced like the girls of their own villages. Freedom of spirit and freedom of expression, she fought hard to have them working at the American Center, using all the musicians in her troupe and taking as assistant the poet Tidjani Cissé, who later became, in 2010, the Arts Minister in Guinée- Conakry. Now she is dancing with a dozen master drummers (Abbouh Boubacar, Sidiki Condé, Amara Soumah, and so on). Her class is ‘sold out’. Sixty students at each session, some of them will become professors in their own right. And during the weekends, she gave workshops all over France, Europe or North Africa and was invited on a regular basis to take part to some international festivals. Jeanine Claes's classes attracted also the new wave of French actresses such as Isabelle Adjani, Isabelle Huppert, Sandrine Bonnaire (with her mum), Bernadette Lafont (with her daughters) and Valerie Kaprisky – her dancing sequence in La Femme Publique (Andrzej Zulawski) leaves no doubt about the huge influence of Jeanine Claes. In Paris, Jeanine was now a sought after celebrity.

Very hard on herself, Jeanine Claes was also tough on her students, her musicians and everything else, talk to Mick Jagger about it! In June 1978, promoting their new vinyl album Black and Blue, the Rolling Stones played four days in a row at the Abattoirs de La Villette (Paris). The Stones's singer asked Jeanine to finish their Europeans Tour with them. She was to be on stage in a brief dress but she refused telling Jagger it was too vulgar.

=== The come-back (1978–1979) ===
Easter 1978, after breaking up with Guem, in July she took two weeks off in the South of Spain but a terrible car accident cut it short. Repatriated in emergency by plane at l’hôpital Cochin, in Paris, the surgeon's diagnosis was brutal : dislocation fracture C4 – C5 (between the 4th and 5th cervical vertebrae). Her dancing career was over. But instead of performing a normal ‘welding’ procedure, the surgeon decided to set up a dispositif in titanium, hoping that she could walk again one day. But dancing again, never ! She stayed lying down in her hospital bed, her neck in a cast, for about three months before returning to her flat in a wheelchair. A few weeks later she ‘sacked’ her physiotherapist team arguing that she could rehabilitate herself through basic dancing exercises which in the past helped her to naturally sculpt her body. Three months later she was working at the American Center with a neck brace. One day, in front of her students and drummers, she removed the neck brace and threw it violently on the dance floor. She was back, back to her best; surprised with her amazing recovery, the surgeon came to her class with a video team to film.

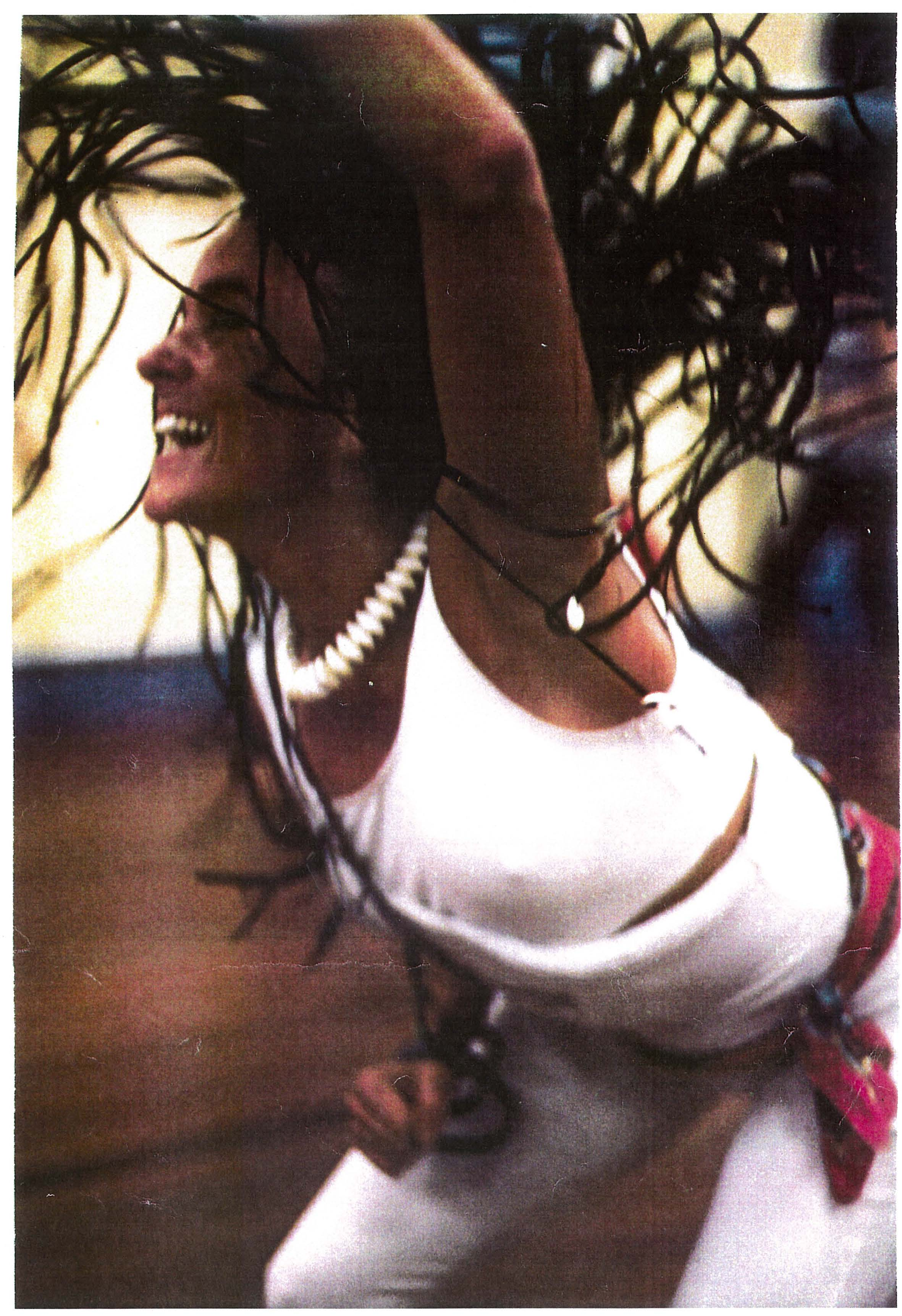
Photograph of Hugh Hamilton, Bondi Pavillon, Sydney

=== Around the world (1979–1985) ===
From then on, Jeanine Claes's cervical vertebrae needed to be exposed on a regular basis to heat. So she started travelling around the world, looking for sunny and warm spots. First to the Casamance region, following the advice of her Africains musicians because on stage, the sight of ex-partner Guem unsettled her. So she went to live in a village where a marabout had success treating her condition. Since then, each time she was back in Africa, she saw a marabout. And when in Haïti, she went through a voodoo ritual in the ghetto of Port-au-Prince.

When spending time in some authentic African villages, her artistic répertoire was enhanced. And back from Haïti, she introduced some undulations in her dance which was then at its top. No one was able to label her dance or style. The experts could only agree that, with Carolyn Carlson, she was the only dancer where it was possible to see a special difference, an aura, an illuminated light. Jane Fonda heard about Jeanine's work. Close to make a fortune with Aerobics, developed in 1968 by the Dr Kenneth H.Cooper, the American actress and businesswoman offered a golden bridge to Jeanine to cross the Atlantic to live in California where her dancing method could be then commercialized. But, as with Mick Jagger, Jeanine declined Fonda, with the resounding rejection where she deplored that in Aerobics classes the participants are disconnected with their spiritual life – they are like little machines, robots with muscles but no feeling.

=== Exile in the South Pacific ===
Now at the top of her craft, Jeanine Claes started a world tour accompanied by two drummers. She ended up in Sydney, at the Bondi Pavilion, where facing the Pacific Ocean she taught until 2001 before eventually dying in Tasmania.

== Methodology ==
Claes approached African dance as a disciplines rooted in a state of mind, emphasizing that after understanding the rhythm of the drum, the students need to be able to communicate with it. This very own and long understanding of the drum will take the students to a better understanding of themselves. Failing to do so, the dance becomes a cliché. Jeanine Claes had the reputation to break down the steps for her students, and her priority was always to allow any of them, whatever its age or level, to start dancing straight away.

== Therapy ==
At the American Center, some students registered under their general practician's recommendations as the French medical Authorities were convinced about the benefits of Jeanine Claes's Rhythm and Dance for the equilibrium of their patients. In her African Dance expression classes, it was all about the rotation of the pelvis but to manage it the students needed first to free their head. If a reconciliation between their body and their mind can then take place, they will also free themselves sexually in the process.

== Main choreographies ==
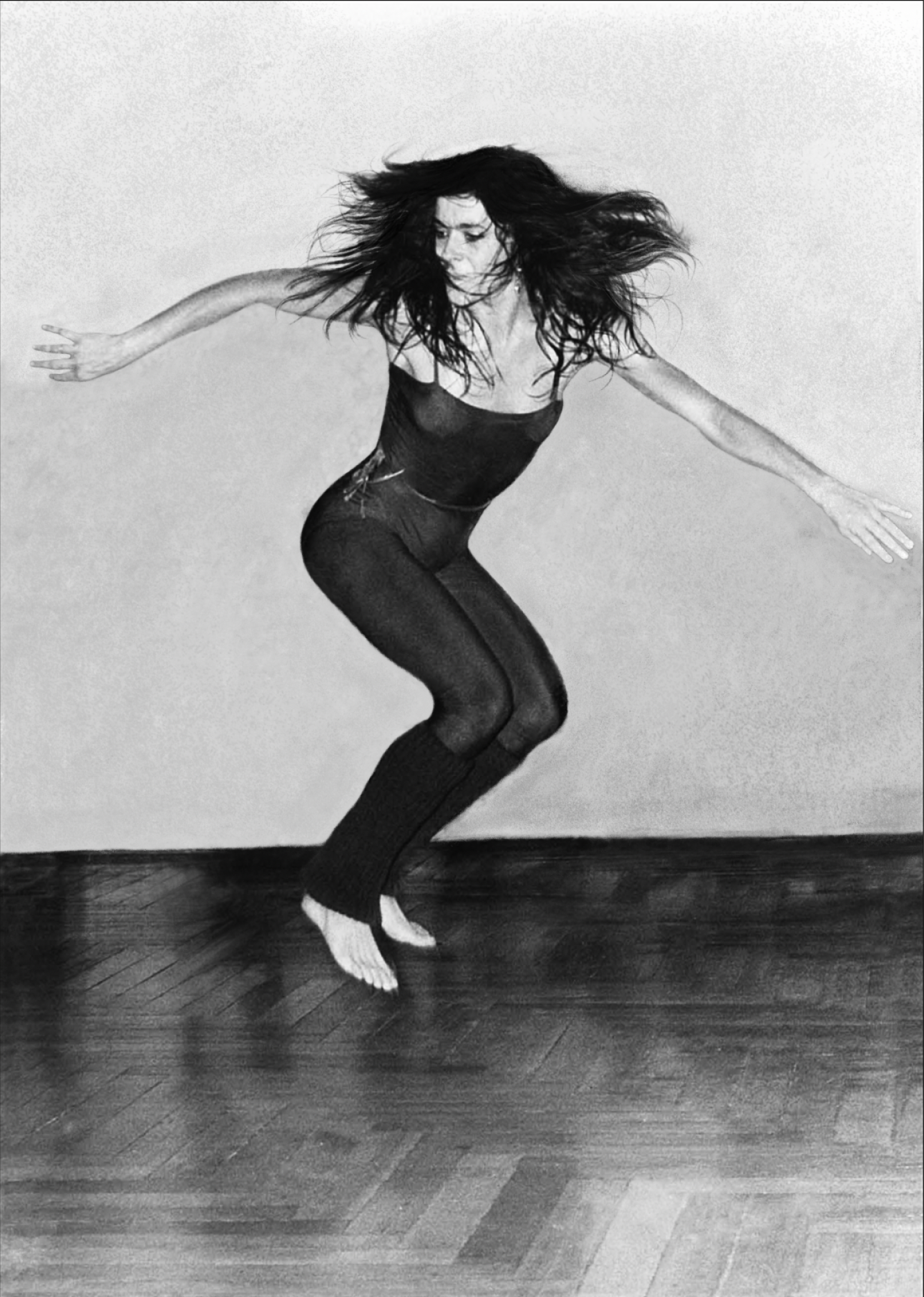
Collection Jeanine Claes

In most of her own choreographies, Jeanine Claes is the main interpreter.

Very often her shows don't carry a specific name and its format can change without notice. She often performs her choreographies in solo. Placed under the sign of improvisation it's very rare that the next show looks like the previous despite being named the same, being connected each time with the stage space, the number of drummers, the dialogue existing then between dancers and musicians.

- L’Africaine, September 1990 (Kensington, Sydney).
- Shooting Star, August 1987. First created exclusively for the Performance Space of Sydney, this show will be play for about a year in the theatres and clubs of the capital of New South Wales.
- Rythme et Danse, 1980–1985. This show travel also in Europe and in Africa. A version of it with three drummers was performed
- Soleil, 1980
- Voyage, in the seventies
- Tam-Tam, in the early seventies

== Discography ==
In 1980, to give an opportunity to her students to train at home, she composed and produced an album vinyl. Her rhythms are original and don't have anything traditional. The album was recorded in few days at the Studio 142, Rue Réaumur (Paris IIe), with two drummers, the backbone of her classes at the American Centre : the Senegalese Aziz N’Diaye et the French-West Indies born Philippe Lincy who later started his own group Doudoumba.

- Soleil : Rythme et danse (1980, Jeanine Claes – JC 5947-1/Fr)
