= Kendal Mint Cake =

English confection

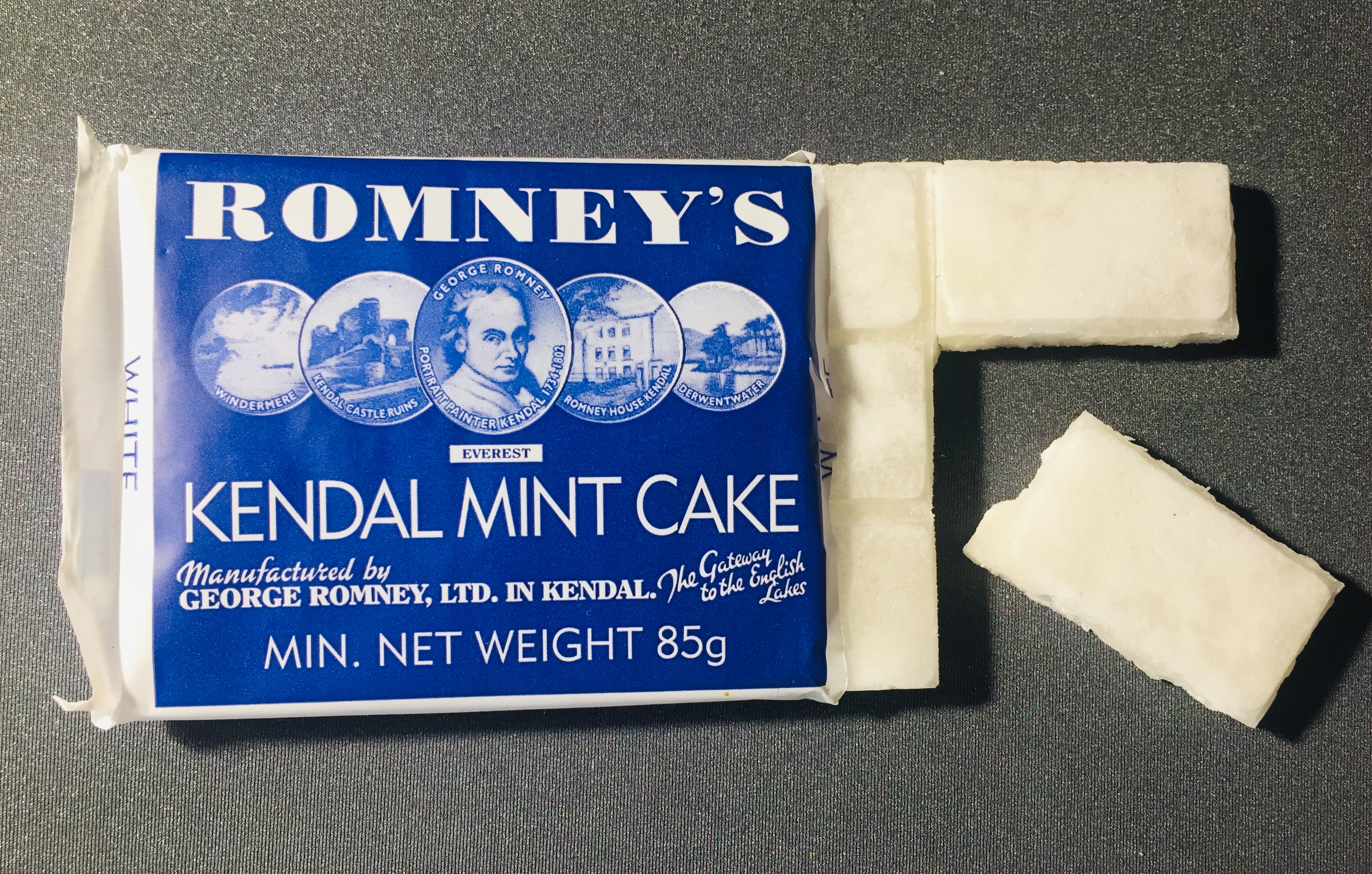
- A packet of Romney's Kendal mint cake
- Type: Confectionery, Energy bar
- Place of origin: England
- Region or state: Cumbria
- Created by: Joseph Wiper
- Main ingredients: Sugar, glucose, peppermint

Kendal Mint Cake is a sugar-based confection flavoured with peppermint. It originates from Kendal in Cumbria, England. Kendal Mint Cake is popular among climbers and mountaineers, especially those from the United Kingdom, as a source of sugar, and therefore energy.

== History ==
Kendal Mint Cake is based on a traditional recipe known as mint cake, peppermint tablet, and various other names. Three companies still produce Kendal Mint Cake. The origin of the cake is allegedly a batch of glacier mint sweets that went wrong. In 1869, Joseph Wiper, who married into the Thompson family of confectioners based in Kendal, supposedly left the boiled solution for glacier mints overnight and it turned cloudy and solidified. The resulting 'mint cake' was discovered in the morning.

Wiper began producing mint cake, with several other confectioneries following suit. After Joseph Wiper emigrated to Canada in 1912 his great-nephew, Robert Wiper, took over the family business. Robert marketed Kendal mint cake as an energy snack used on famous expeditions, including the Imperial Trans-Antarctic Expedition led by Sir Ernest Shackleton, which largely led to its rise in international popularity amongst mountaineers and hikers.

=== Quiggin's ===
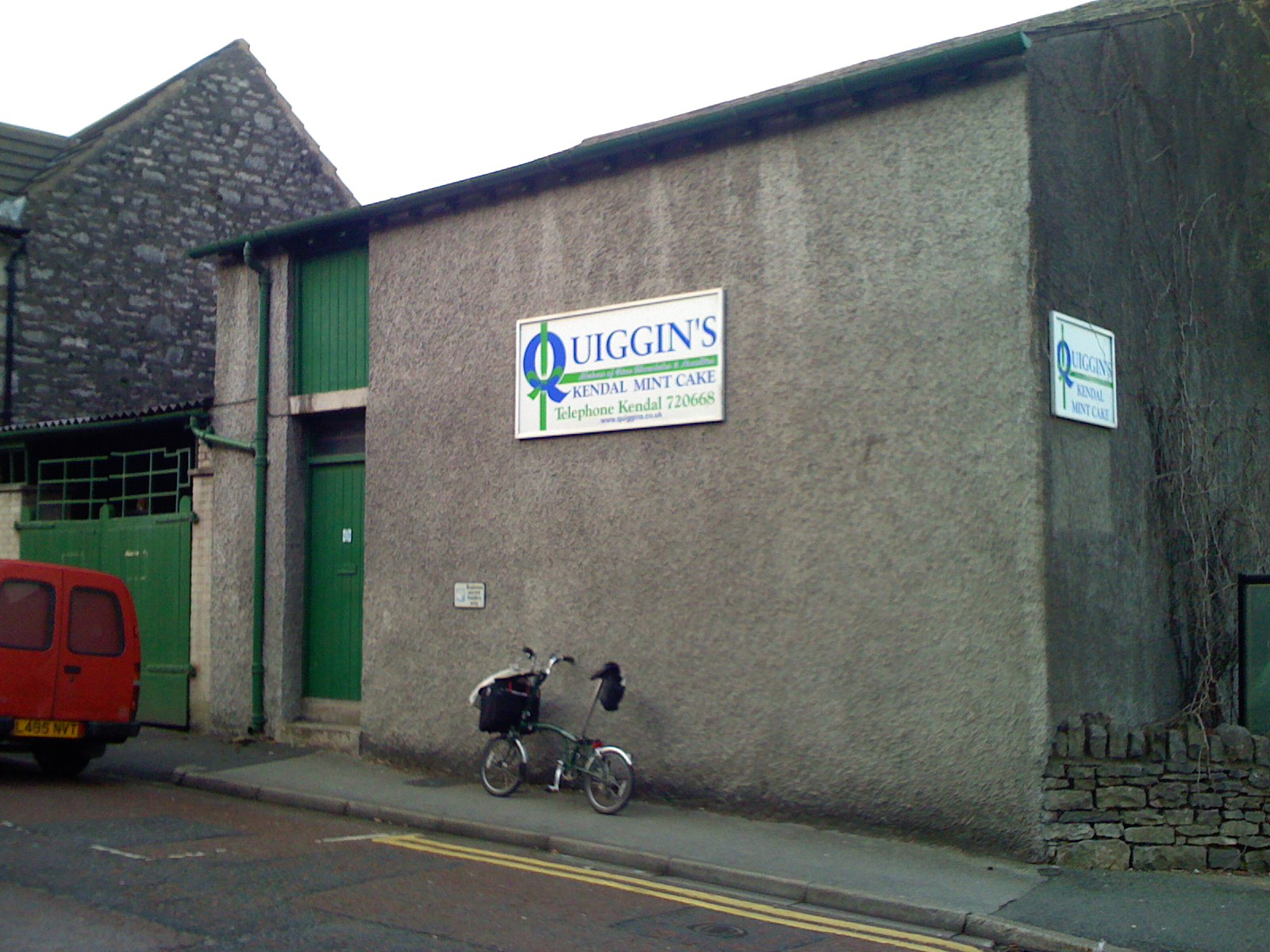
Quiggin's factory on Low Fellside, in Kendal, England

Quiggin's Kendal Mint Cake is the oldest surviving mint cake company. The Quiggin family has been making confectionery since 1840 in the Isle of Man. When one of the four sons, Daniel Quiggin, moved to Kendal in 1880, the mint cake company was formed.

In the BBC TV programme Great British Menu, series 5, Lisa Allen visited Quiggin's factory and used Quiggin's Kendal Mint Cake in her Strawberries with Meringue & Kendal Mint Cake Water Ice dessert.

In series 7 of the BBC TV programme Great British Railway Journeys, presenter Michael Portillo visited Quiggin's factory.

=== Romney's ===
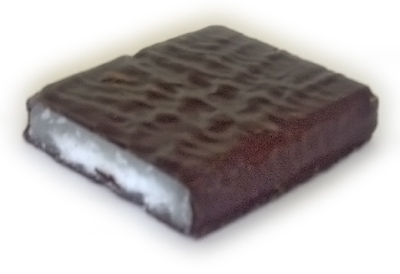
Kendal mint cake with a chocolate coating

Romney's was founded in 1918, and used an old recipe to create mint cake. This mint cake was sold in Kendal and sent by train to other areas of the north-west for sale. In 1987, Romney's bought Wiper's Mint Cake from Harry Wiper, who had inherited ownership of Wiper's in 1960 when his father Robert Wiper died.

In 2016, Romney's collaborated with fashion site Lyst to create a limited run of "Kendall Mint Cakes" to celebrate Kendall Jenner's 21st birthday on 3 November. 200 limited edition cakes were given away on social media.

Romney's appeared on the BBC programme Inside the Factory and Ricky & Ralf's Very Northern Road Trip on Gold in 2020.

The same year also saw the launch of Monopoly - The Lakes Edition, in which Romney's features on the board, a dedicated chance card and the front of the box, alongside other well-known Lake District companies.

=== Wilson's ===
Wilson's Mint Cake was founded in 1913, when James Wilson purchased a factory in the Stricklandgate area of the town. He had previously made and distributed types of toffee, but he decided to instead concentrate on mint cake. In 1966, the firm moved to a location in the Cross Lane area of Kendal. Wilson's was licensed to sell a Beatrix Potter range of sweets. As of 2007, the factory was run by the grandson of James, Andrew Wilson, and mint cake was no longer the major product of the company as chocolate confectionery took up 90% of orders.

After moving from Kendal to Holme in 2013, it was reported in 2016 that the company had closed down. However, the company actually changed hands and is now run by W McClures Ltd, a family-run business that was established in Windermere in 1945, and Kendal Mint Cake is still for sale from their website.

== Manufacturing process ==
Kendal Mint Cake is made from sugar, glucose, water, and peppermint oil. Although the exact recipe and method of manufacturing mint cake is kept secret, it is known that it is created in the following way:

1. The sugar, glucose, water and peppermint oil are boiled in a copper pan.
2. The mixture is continuously stirred (without stirring, the resultant product would be clear).
3. The mixture is then poured into moulds and allowed to set, after which it is broken into individual bars.

Numerous types of mint cake are now available. Mint cake made with white sugar, mint cake made with brown sugar, and mint cake enrobed in chocolate are the most popular varieties.

== Notable uses ==
Kendal Mint Cake has been used on many expeditions around the world as a source of energy:

- Wiper's Kendal Mint Cake was provided for the Imperial Trans-Antarctic Expedition of 1914–1917, which was led by Sir Ernest Shackleton.
- Sir Edmund Hillary and his team carried Romney's Kendal Mint Cake with them on the first successful ascent of Mount Everest in 1953. The packaging currently includes the following: "We sat on the snow and looked at the country far below us … we nibbled Kendal Mint Cake." A member of the successful Everest expedition wrote, "It was easily the most popular item on our high altitude ration – our only criticism was that we did not have enough of it."
- Chris Bonington also used Quiggin's Kendal Mint Cake on his 1975 Everest expedition.
- Ewan McGregor and Charley Boorman included mint cake in their supplies for their 2004 motorcycle trip around the world in Long Way Round. “At times, it seemed like the only thing that had kept us going was the Kendal Mint Cake. If it was good enough for Shackleton and Edmund Hillary, then I suppose it was good enough for us.”

== See also ==
- Mint
- York Peppermint Pattie
- Energy bar
- Kanemochi
- Ninja diet
- First Strike Ration
- Soldier Fuel
