= Somers Nunatak =

Somers Nunatak (67°28′S 67°16′W) is a nunatak rising to about 600 m on the west edge of Reid Glacier, Arrowsmith Peninsula, Loubet Coast. The feature provides a useful vantage point near several geological localities. Following geological work in the area by British Antarctic Survey (BAS), 1980–81, named by United Kingdom Antarctic Place-Names Committee (UK-APC) after Geoff Somers, BAS general assistant at Rothera Station, 1978–81, who assisted in the work.
