= Energy mint =

Energy-enhancing candy

An energy mint is a mint candy that is designed to give the consumer a burst of energy through a combination of energy enhancing ingredients. Energy mints commonly contain caffeine, taurine, various forms of ginseng, B vitamins, or other herbal ingredients. Some contain high levels of sugar, while a few are sugar-free. These mints are popular among young people, computer programmers, gamers, and students.

According to the Wall Street Journal (February 13, 2008), energy mints are part of a relatively new and rapidly expanding "Energy Candy" trend. Major brand names in North America include Peak Energy Mints, Ed Hardy Energy Mints, Penguin Mints, Revive Energy Mints, Bawls mints, VoJo Energy Mints and YJ Stingers Mints..

The Kendal Mint Cake utilises peppermint and is popular with climbers and mountaineers, particularly those from the United Kingdom where it originated. First conceived in 1896, it is included in the rations of numerous expeditions.
