= Tara Polar Station =

French and research platform

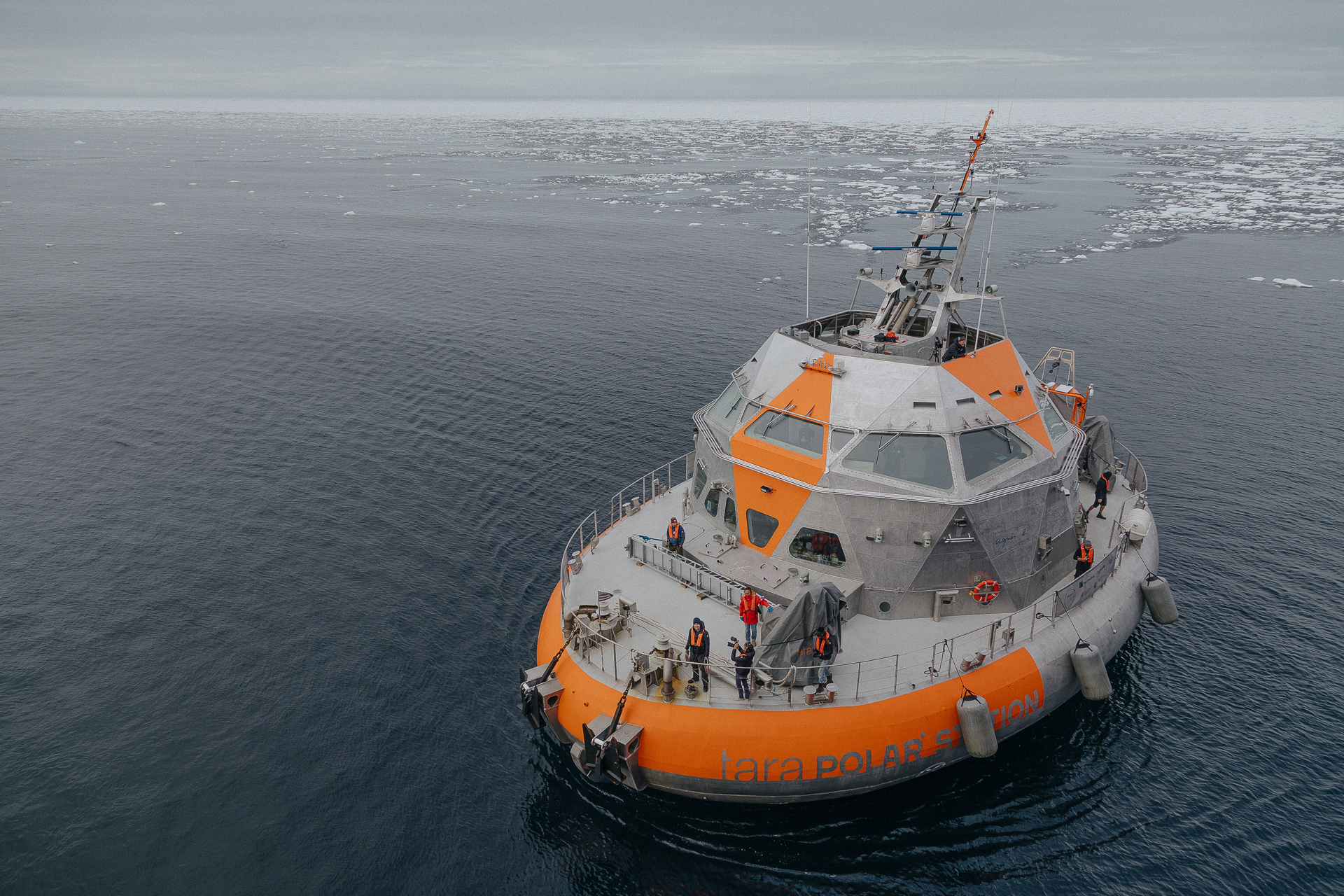
- Tara Polar Station during CONTRASTS expedition

History

France
- Name: Tara Polar Station
- Owner: Fondation Tara Océan
- Route: Arctic
- Builder: Constructions Mécaniques de Normandie
- Cost: € 21 million
- Launched: October 2024
- Home port: Lorient, France
- Identification: Call sign: FNWP; IMO number: 1090064; MMSI number: 228471700
- Status: in active service

General characteristics
- Type: research vessel
- Tonnage: 495 GT
- Displacement: 416 tonnes
- Length: 26 m (85 ft 4 in)
- Beam: 16 m (52 ft 6 in)
- Draft: 2.3 m (7 ft 7 in)
- Ice class: 1A Super
- Installed power: Cummins X15, 336 kW (450 hp)
- Speed: 9.0 knots
- Capacity: 24 persons
- Crew: 20 persons

Tara Polar Station is a French drifting scientific research platform designed for long-term expeditions in the Arctic Ocean, operated by the Tara Ocean Foundation and its collaborators.

== Development ==
The station is financed and designed by the Tara Foundation and was built in Cherbourg, France, from May 2023 to April 2025, after 5 years of design. It was christened in Lorient, France, on 24 April 2025. The project has its origins in the Arctic expedition of the schooner Tara, conducted between September 2006 and January 2008.

== Design ==
The station was designed by the architect Oliver Petit and will be able to work in temperatures down to −52 °C (−62 °F). It has a length of 26 metres (85 ft), a width of 16 metres (52 ft), and it can accommodate a crew of 12 people in winter and up to 20 people in summer. Its hull is made from 20-mm-thick aluminium sheets. The station has a 1.6 m diameter moon pool, which can be used for underwater sampling using CTD-rosette, remotely operated vehicles, and autonomous underwater vehicles. The ship has a living area of 400 square meters and is divided into four levels: (1) bridge deck with wheelhouse and captain’s office, (2) main deck with entryway, sickbay, sauna, galley, and mess, (3) lower deck with twelve crew cabins and six laboratories, and (4) lower deck with auxiliary compartment (diesel and kerosene storage) and the engine/propulsion room. The station is equipped with solar panels, a wind turbine, and biodiesel generators.

== Research ==
Tara Polar Station supports a long-term multidisciplinary programme studying the coupled atmosphere, sea ice and ocean of the central Arctic Ocean. The Tara Polaris programme, planned from 2026 to 2046, consists of repeated year-long drifts covering all seasons, allowing seasonal and interannual variability to be distinguished from longer-term environmental changes. Research includes observations of meteorology, clouds, aerosols and trace gases; snow cover, sea-ice properties and dynamics; ocean temperature, salinity and mixing; and under-ice light, nutrients, biodiversity and microbial activity. The programme also studies carbon cycling and the transport of contaminants such as mercury and plastics through the Arctic environment.

== Expeditions ==
Tara Polar Station was tested in ice conditions in July 2025 during the CONTRASTS expedition. It left Longyearbyen, Svalbard, on 4 July, and sailed towards sea ice together with the research vessel Polarstern. There are at least 10 planned Arctic expeditions along the Transpolar Drift, following the route of Nansen's Fram expedition, Soviet and Russian drifting stations, and the MOSAiC Expedition.

=== Arctic Drift Expedition (2026–2027) ===
Tara Polar Station began its first long-term Arctic expedition in July 2026, departing from Lorient for a multinational scientific mission across the Arctic Ocean. The expedition studies biodiversity and climate change and includes researchers from twelve countries. The station entered the sea ice north of Severnaya Zemlya on 1 September and reached its selected ice floe, at approximately 82.4° N, 155.05° E, on 9 September. It was moored to the floe on 13 September, beginning its drift across the Arctic Ocean. The drift is expected to last 350–500 days along the Transpolar Drift towards the Fram Strait, with completion planned for late 2027.

By October 2026, the station had become frozen into the surrounding sea ice, and a scientific ice camp had been established. Approximately a dozen autonomous instruments, including an underwater visual trap for photographing marine organisms, had been deployed to measure ocean currents, temperature, salinity, carbon export, fish and zooplankton distributions, underwater light, atmospheric conditions, and sea-ice thickness. Snow and sea-ice sampling sites were concentrated on newly formed ice, while thicker, older ice was primarily used for access and scientific operations. Dedicated sites were also established for snow trace-substance analyses.

== See also ==
- Drifting ice station
- Tara expedition
- List of research vessels by country
