= Lycée Charles Petiet =

School in Villeneuve-la-Garenne, France

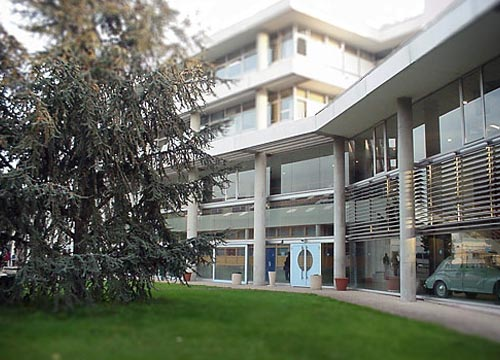
Charles Petiet High School seen from Avenue Gallieni.

Lycée polyvalent Charles Petiet is a senior high school/sixth-form college in Villeneuve-la-Garenne, Hauts-de-Seine, France, in the Paris metropolitan area.

== History ==
It was first established in 1943.

It celebrated its 70-year anniversary in 2013.
