= Hôtel de Ville, Gennevilliers =

Town hall in Gennevilliers, France

Hôtel de Ville
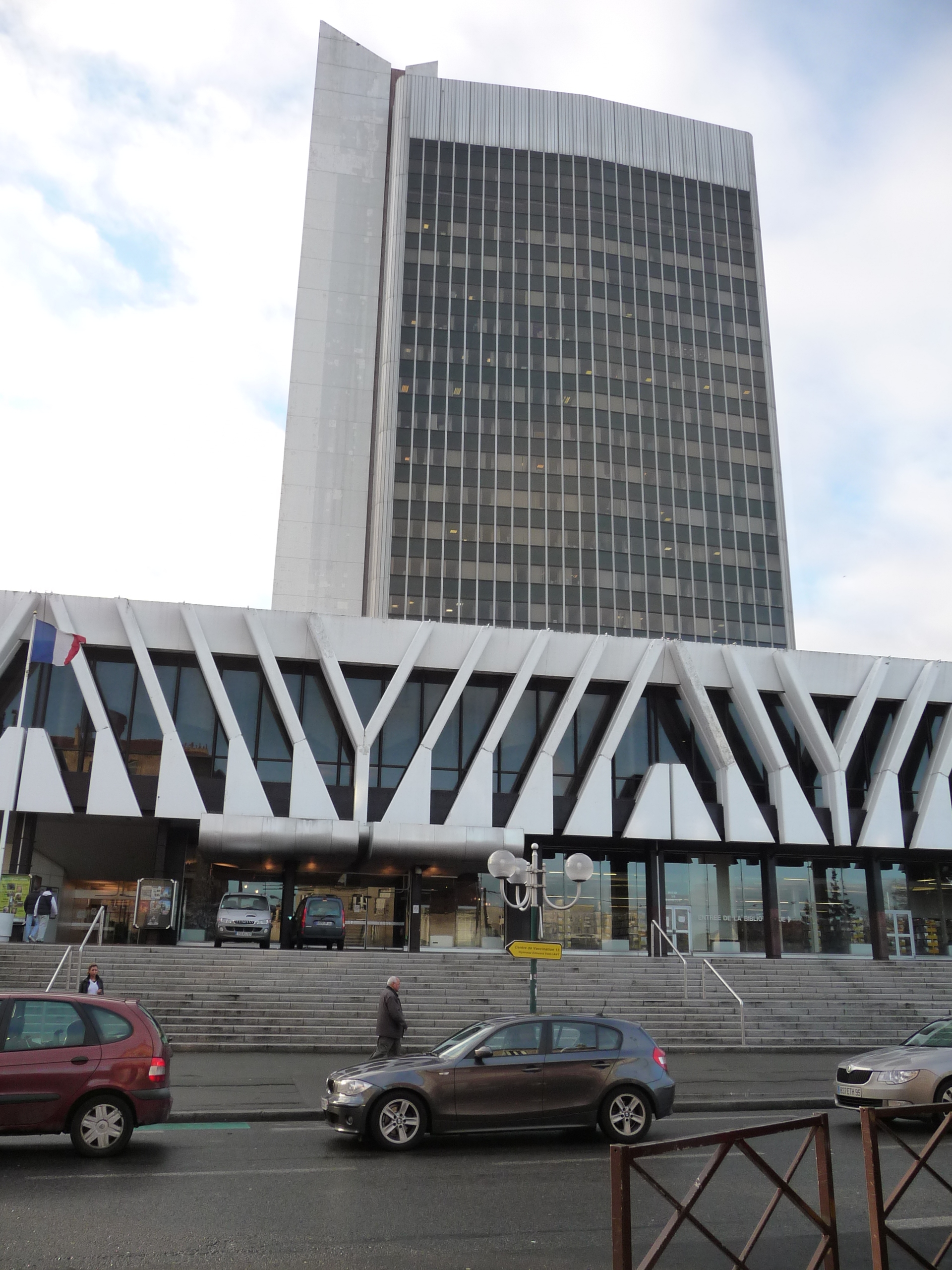
- The main frontage of the Hôtel de Ville in December 2009
- Interactive map of the Hôtel de Ville area

General information
- Type: City hall
- Architectural style: Modern style
- Location: Gennevilliers, France
- Coordinates: 48.9255°N 2.2933°E
- Completed: 1977

Height
- Height: 66 meters (217 ft)

Design and construction
- Architect: Georges Auzolle

The Hôtel de Ville (French pronunciation: [otɛl də vil], City Hall) is a municipal building in Gennevilliers, Hauts-de-Seine, in the northwestern suburbs of Paris, standing on Avenue Gabriel Péri.

== History ==
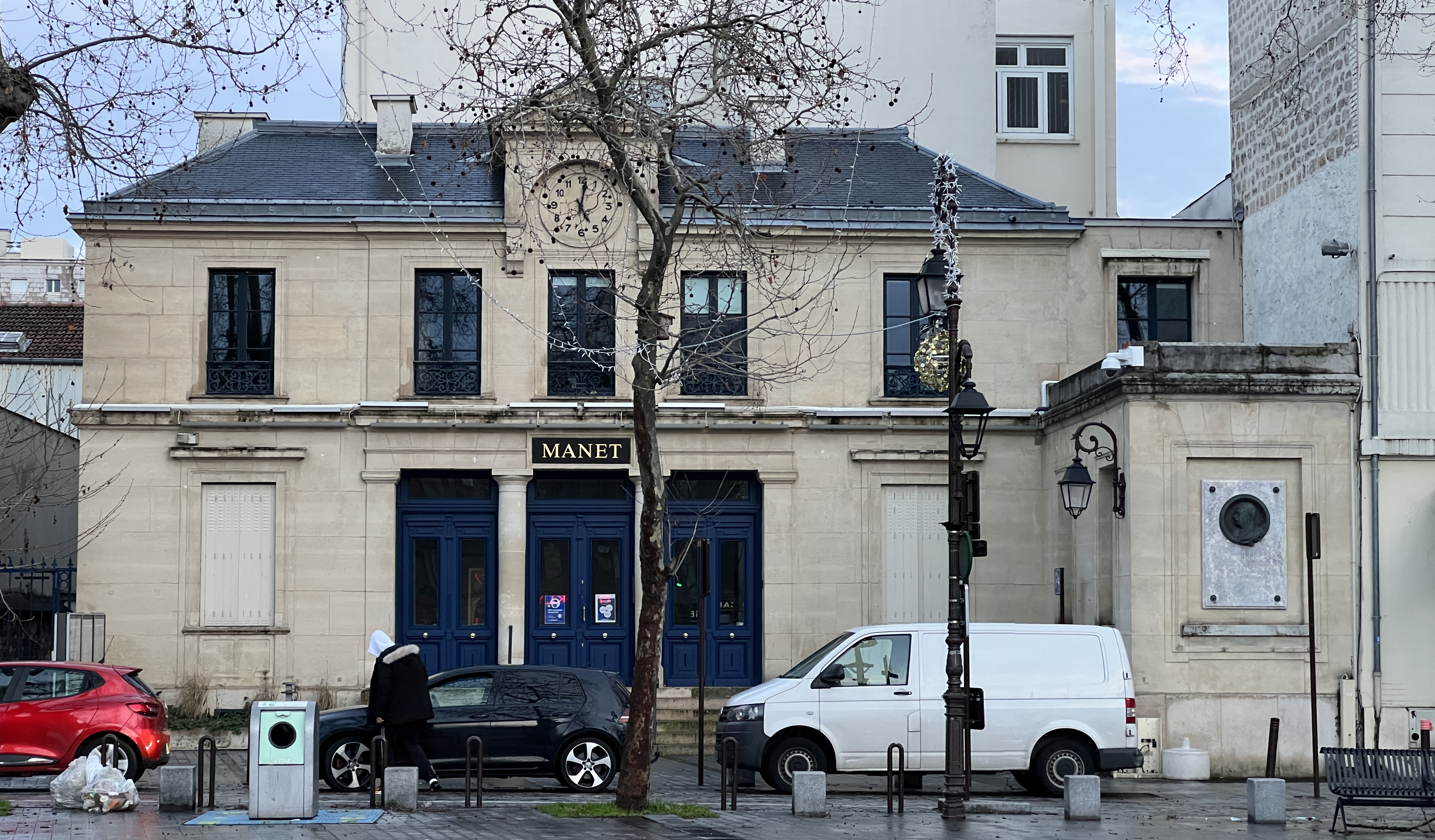
The old town hall

After the French Revolution, the newly elected town council initially held their meetings in the home of the mayor at the time. However, in the mid-19th century, they decided to commission a dedicated municipal building. The site they selected was on the east side of what is now Place Jean-Grandel. Construction of the new building started in 1862. It was designed by Jacques Paul Lequeux in the neoclassical style, built in ashlar stone and was officially opened in 1865.

The design involved a symmetrical main frontage of five bays facing onto Place Jean-Grandel. The central section of three bays, which was slightly projected forward, featured a short flight of steps leading up to three openings separated by Doric order columns supporting an entablature. There were three casement windows on the first floor and, above the central bay, there was a clock with a stone surround and a triangular pediment. The outer bays were fenestrated in a similar style. A medallion in half-relief created by the sculptor, Auguste Maillard, depicting an effigy of the former mayor, Louis Roche, was installed on a wall to the right of the main frontage in 1930. The building served as the Ecole municipale des Beaux-arts Galerie Édouard-Manet from 1978, and was dedicated to the life of the modernist painter, Édouard Manet, who lived in the town.

During the Paris insurrection, part of the Second World War, elements of the French Forces of the Interior seized the town hall on 21 August 1944. This was four days before the official liberation of the town by the French 2nd Armoured Division, commanded by General Philippe Leclerc, on 25 August 1944.

Following significant population growth in the 1960s, the council, led by the mayor, Waldeck L'Huillier, decided to commission a modern town hall. The site they selected was at the north end of an area known as Les Agnettes, which was experiencing rapid development at that time. The new building was designed by the town architect, Georges Auzolle, in the modern style, built in concrete and glass and was officially opened in 1977.

The design involved a 20-storey tower, with a slightly convex main frontage, sitting behind a two-storey podium, facing onto Avenue Gabriel Péri. The tower was 66 meters (217 ft) high and was faced with alternating bands of light and dark glass, separated into bays by 23 full-height metal strips. Internally, the principal room was the Salle du Conseil (council chamber). An extensive programme of refurbishment works to the ground floor area was completed in 2021.
