= Port of Gennevilliers =

Coordinates: 48°56′42″N 2°16′52″E

The Port of Gennevilliers is the largest port in the Ile-de-France (greater Paris area) and the largest French river port (covering 401 hectares). It is an inland port, located in the commune of Gennevilliers in the north of the Hauts-de-Seine. It is the second most important in Europe, just behind Duisburg in Germany.

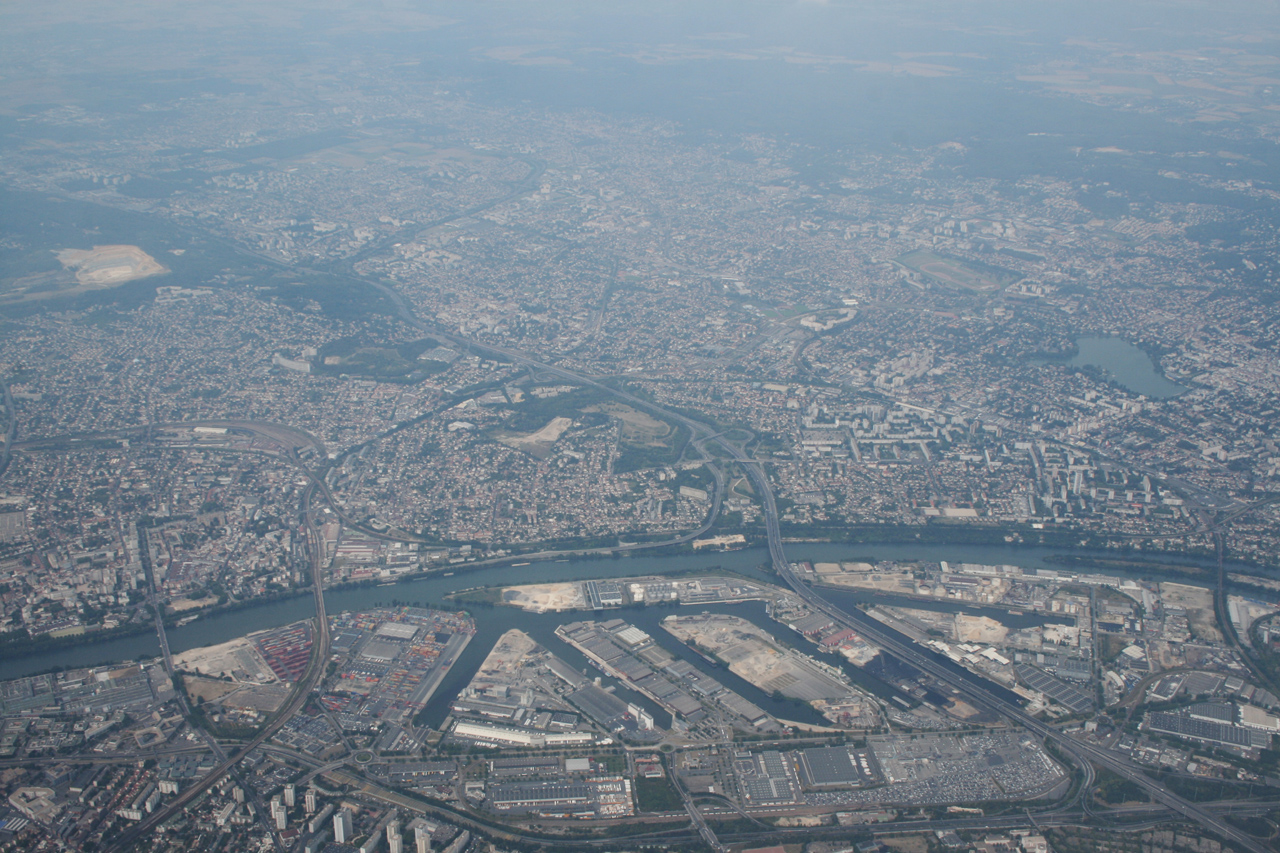
Aerial view of the port

The port is primarily of a commercial nature. It is an important delivery terminal for semi-finished non-perishable freight from lower-Seine (via Le Havre), and also for heavy materials carried by the French canal system.

Every year, more than 20m tonnes of goods go through this port, that handles 13% of the region’s goods supplies. The main categories of port traffic are construction materials, metals, agro-industrial products, finished products, environmental and waste recycling activities, energy products, containers and heavy packages.

The port is suitable for use by river barges, but accepts more and more container barges carrying finished industrial products (furniture, electric and electronic goods), chemicals, petroleum and heating products, grains and other bulk non-perishable agricultural goods. Modifications are underway to allow the port to accept refrigerated river traffic (such as fishing products and meat and fruit and vegetable processors). The refrigerated section will allow the Marché d'Intérêt National de Rungis to become less dependent on road traffic.
