= Lycée Galilée (Gennevilliers) =

Senior high school in France

Lycée Galilée is a comprehensive senior high school/sixth-form college in Gennevilliers, Hauts-de-Seine, France, in the Paris metropolitan area. As of 2016 the school has about 900 students.

The school has a boarding facility (internat) available.

There is also a plastics industry training programme.
