= Villeneuve-la-Garenne =

- Commune
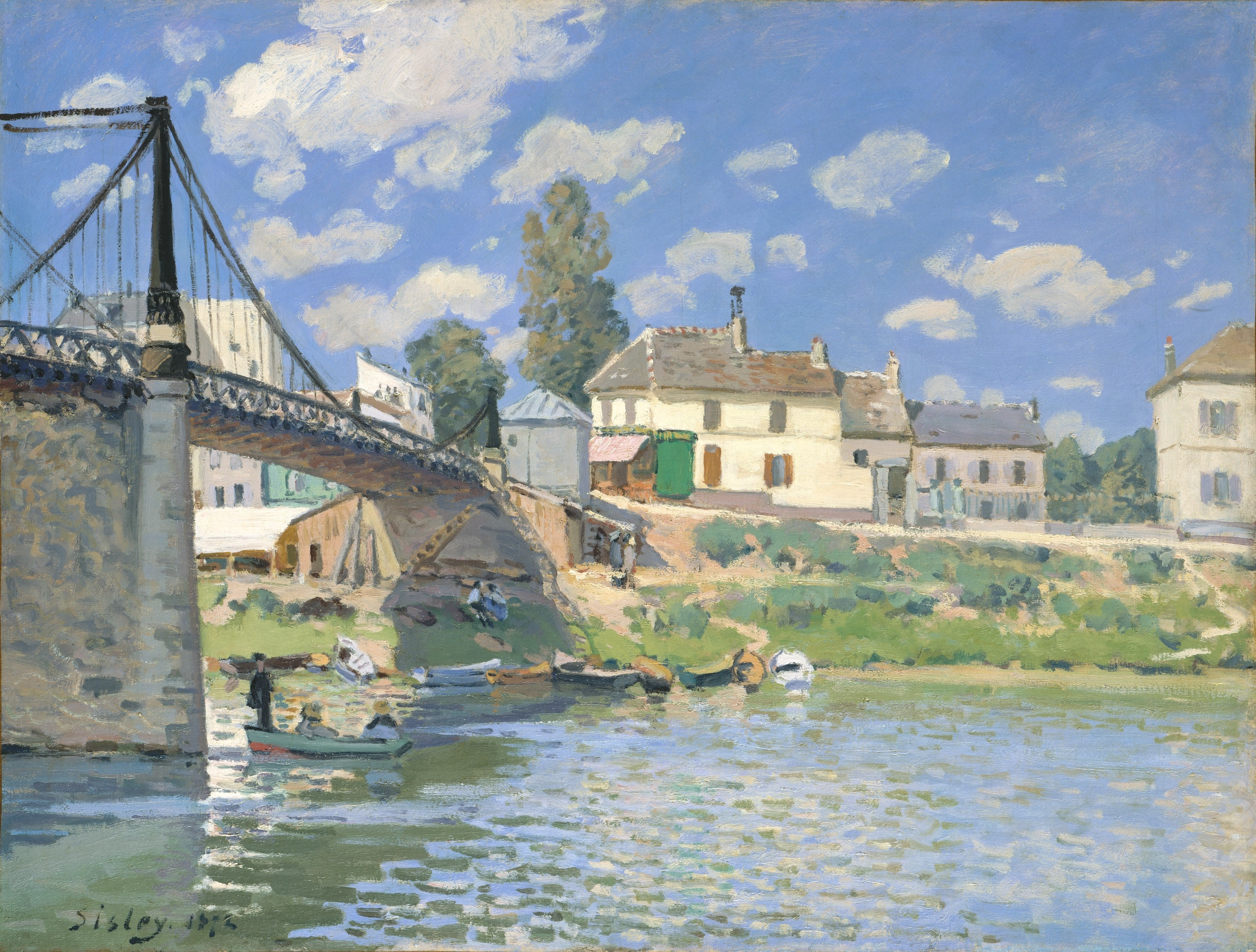
- Bridge at Villeneuve-la-Garenne by Alfred Sisley (1872)

- Coat of arms

- Location (in red) within Paris inner suburbs
- Location of Villeneuve-la-Garenne
- Location within France Location within Île-de-France (region)
- Coordinates: 48°56′14″N 2°19′40″E
- Country: France
- Region: Île-de-France
- Department: Hauts-de-Seine
- Arrondissement: Nanterre
- Canton: Gennevilliers
- Intercommunality: Grand Paris

Government
  - Mayor (2026–32): Pascal Pelain
- Area^{1}: 3.2 km^{2} (1.2 sq mi)
- Elevation: 29 m (95 ft)
- Population (2023): 26,021
  - Density: 8,100/km^{2} (21,000/sq mi)
- Time zone: UTC+01:00 (CET)
  - Summer (DST): UTC+02:00 (CEST)
- INSEE/Postal code: 92078 /92390
- ^{1} French Land Register data, which excludes lakes, ponds, glaciers > 1 km^{2} (0.386 sq mi or 247 acres) and river estuaries.

Villeneuve-la-Garenne (French pronunciation: [vilnœv la ɡaʁɛn]) is a commune in the northern suburbs of Paris, France. It is located 9.2 km (5.7 mi) from the center of Paris in the Hauts-de-Seine department in the Île-de-France region.

== History ==
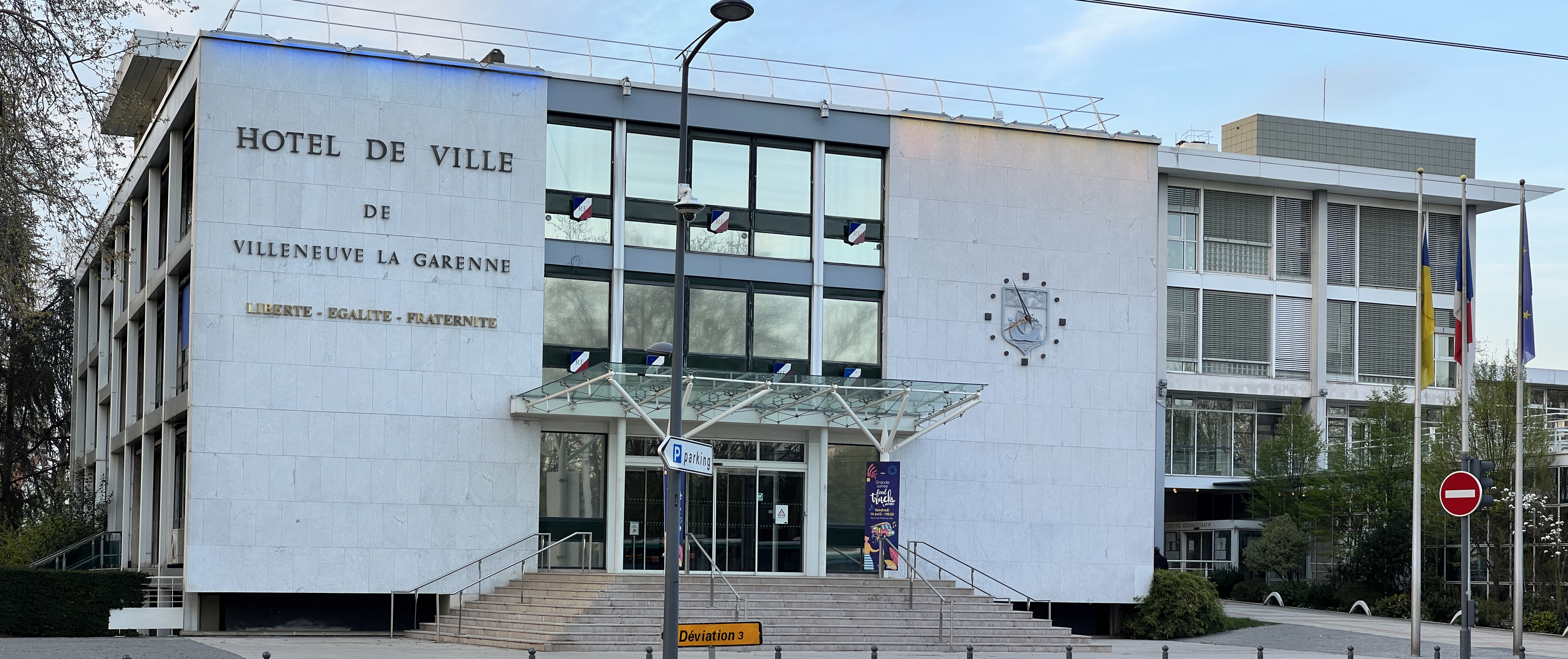
The Hôtel de Ville

The commune of Villeneuve-la-Garenne was created on 9 April 1929 by detaching its territory from the commune of Gennevilliers.

During the repression of January and February 1894, the police conducted raids targeting the anarchists living there, without much success.

The Hôtel de Ville was completed in 1965.

== Transport ==
Villeneuve-la-Garenne is served by no station of the Paris Métro, RER, or suburban rail network. The closest station to Villeneuve-la-Garenne is Saint-Denis station, which is an interchange station on Paris RER line D and on the Transilien Paris – Nord suburban rail line. This station is located in the commune of Saint-Denis, 0.9 km (0.56 mi) from the town center of Villeneuve-la-Garenne.

The town is well-served by the Paris metropolitan bus system : several lines run through its territory. (RATP bus lines 137, 177, 178, 261 and 378).

Since 15 November 2012, the city is served by a tram (Line 1).

== Demographics ==
As of 2016 almost 37% of the residents were under 25 years of age.

Historical population

Year	Pop.	±% p.a.
1931	3,954	—
1936	4,031	+0.39%
1946	3,584	−1.17%
1954	4,035	+1.49%
1962	13,780	+16.59%
1968	22,715	+8.69%
1975	23,691	+0.60%

Year	Pop.	±% p.a.
1982	23,906	+0.13%
1990	23,824	−0.04%
1999	22,349	−0.71%
2007	24,516	+1.16%
2012	25,725	+0.97%
2017	23,771	−1.57%
2023	26,021	+1.52%

Source: EHESS and INSEE (1968-2023)

== Education ==
As of the 2015–2016 school year the commune had 1,280 preschool students, 1,973 elementary students, and 1,978 secondary students.

Junior high schools include:

- Collège Édouard Manet
- Collège Georges Pompidou

Senior high schools:

- Lycée polyvalent Charles Petiet
- Lycée Michel Ange

The public library is the Bibliothèque Aimé-Césaire.

== Twin towns – sister cities ==
Villeneuve-la-Garenne is twinned with:

- Hof, Germany

== Notable people ==
- Éric Marester, footballer
- Romain Habran, footballer

== Economy ==
Villeneuve-la-Garenne is home to shipyards:

- Chantier de la Société Française de Construction navale
- Vanpraet Chantiers Navals du Nord

== See also ==
- Communes of the Hauts-de-Seine department
