= 1990 International Trans-Antarctica Expedition =

First non-mechanised crossing of Antarctica

1990 International Trans-Antarctica Expedition was a 6,021-kilometre (3,741-mile), 220-day expedition and the first-ever non-mechanized crossing of Antarctica. The six-member, international team was co-led by U.S. team member, Will Steger and French team member, Dr. Jean-Louis Étienne. The other team members were Victor Boyarsky (Soviet Union), Geoff Somers (Great Britain), Qin Dahe (China) and Keizo Funatsu (Japan). The expedition was operated in partnership with the Soviet Arctic and Antarctic Research Institute through a joint venture. Primary expedition sponsors were W. L. Gore and Associates and Union d'Assurances de Paris (UAP).

The expedition's purpose was to bring international attention to the continent of Antarctica and the early signs of climate change. The expedition's goal was to advocate for an environmental protocol and continuation of the Antarctic Treaty that would open up for review in 1991. Following the expedition, the six team members visited their countries' leaders and lobbied for the environmental protocol and Antarctic mining ban that were currently under discussion as addenda to the Antarctic Treaty.

A post-expedition article in The New York Times described the expedition: "The trip took seven months; the team endured temperatures that dipped to 113 degrees [Fahrenheit] below zero and one storm that lasted 50 days. No one had ever tried a polar crossing of such length; it is unlikely anyone ever will again."

== The route ==
The expedition traveled to Antarctica on a Soviet Ilyushin 76 from Minneapolis, Minnesota to King George Island and was transported from King George Island to its starting point, Seal Nunataks, on the Larsen Ice Shelf by Twin Otter. Beginning on the Antarctic Peninsula on July 26, 1989, the expedition traveled the length of the peninsula - the first to do so during the Antarctic winter. There, they encountered heavy storms, deep crevasses and hurricane-level winds. Once on the plateau, the expedition traveled at an average elevation of 3,000 metres (10,000 ft) along the Ellsworth and Thiel mountain ranges to the U.S. base at the South Pole, arriving on December 11, 1989.

The team then traveled through the area known as the "Area of Inaccessibility," a region east of the South Pole which, due to its extreme isolation, had never been crossed on the ground and rarely by airplane. The team then visited the Soviet base at Vostok on the continent's interior and finished at the Soviet scientific research base at Mirnyy on March 3, 1990, as Antarctica winter set in once again. The team was evacuated from the continent by Soviet ship, the Professor Zubov.

== Logistics ==
The team traveled by dogsled: three sleds and a rotation of 36 dogs. From the Antarctic Peninsula to the South Pole, the expedition was supported by caches that had been placed at regular intervals during the previous summer season. These caches were supplemented by several Twin Otter flights that carried food, rested dogs and a film crew and photographer to meet the expedition. Several of the caches were not found, as they had been buried too deep by drifting snow.

From the South Pole to the Soviet's Vostok Station, the team was resupplied by a Twin Otter that was stationed at the South Pole. From Vostok to the finish, the expedition was supported by Soviet trucks that moved 80 kilometres (50 mi) in front of the expedition, dropping supplies and staying close enough for rescue, should it be needed.

Primary navigation was done by sextant. The team also carried with them a GPS prototype that allowed trackers in France to pinpoint the team's location once a day and retrieve a 36-character message from the team. The team carried a 110-watt radio which allowed them, when reception permitted, to receive their satellite-tracked location from support crew on stand-by in Chile.

Dr. Qin Dahe, the expedition's Chinese team member, collected snow samples every 50 kilometres (30 mi) across the continent to measure evidence of climate changes over time. After the expedition, Dr. Qin earned a senior position in the Intergovernmental Panel on Climate Change (IPCC), an organization that won the Nobel Peace Prize in 2007. In 2013, Qin Dahe received the Volvo Environment Prize. Other scientific research on the expedition included psychological and blood sampling on behalf of the European Space Agency (Dr. Jean-Louis Étienne), and ground ozone readings by Soviet team member, Victor Boyarsky.

Broadcast rights to expedition coverage were sold in 52 countries and the first-ever international live broadcast from Antarctica occurred at the expedition's end. Five ABC Sports Trans-Antarctica specials were broadcast in the United States over the seven-month period, one of which earned a 1989 Emmy Award for best sports programming special. A full-length feature film was distributed in France.

Trans-Antarctica organizers estimated that the expedition reached over 10 million school children worldwide, with printed materials, regular updates by facsimile (FAX), a phone hot-line, museum exhibits at the Cité des Sciences et de l'Industrie in Paris and the Science Museum of Minnesota, a truck outfitted to be a traveling display, and regular reports in publications like Weekly Reader and China Youth Daily.

In 1996, Will Steger was named the first National Geographic Society Explorer-in-Residence and earned the National Geographic John Oliver La Gorce Medal, awarded only nineteen times in the society's history. Following the expedition, Will Steger founded the Center for Global Environmental Education at Hamline University in St. Paul, Minnesota, and the Will Steger Foundation, now called the Climate Generation, A Will Steger Legacy. The organization encourages young people to take action on climate issues. Following the expedition, Jean-Louis Etienne led numerous expeditions in the Arctic and Antarctic.
