= Geoff Somers =

British explorer (1950–2026)

Geoff Somers MBE
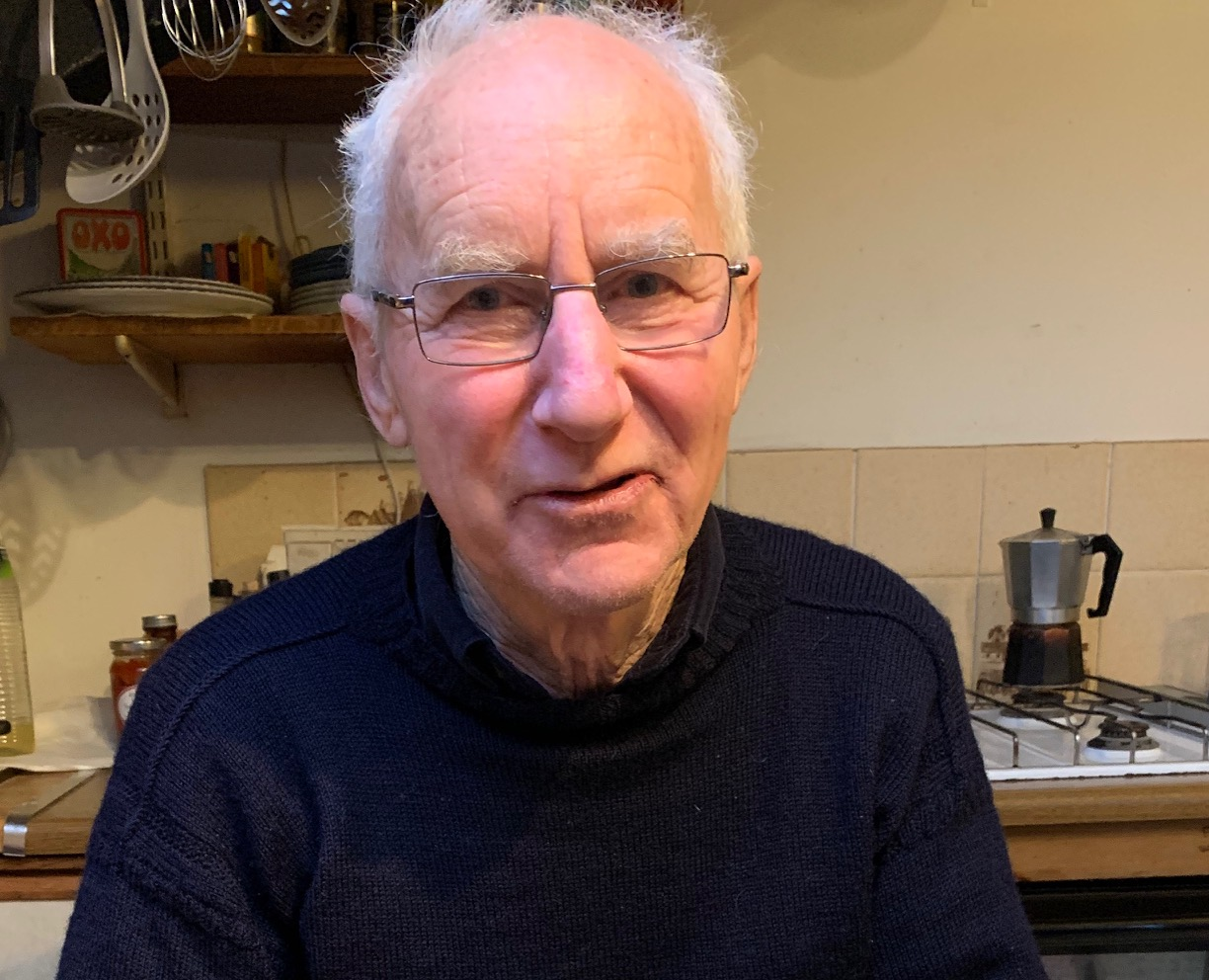
- Born: 19 February 1950; Khartoum, Anglo-Egyptian Sudan
- Died: 18 July 2026 (aged 76)
- Education: St Joseph's College, Ipswich, Suffolk
- Occupations: Explorer and guide
- Awards: Member of the Order of the British Empire; Polar Medal

Geoffrey Usher Somers MBE (19 February 1950 – 18 July 2026) was a British explorer, particularly of the polar regions. He was the first Briton to cross Antarctica on foot, and has an Antarctic peak named in his honour, Somers Nunatak. In 1992 he was appointed a Member of the Order of the British Empire for services to outdoor education and polar exploration, and in 1996 the Polar Medal for his contributions to polar exploration.

== Biography ==
Somers was born on 19 February 1950 in Khartoum, where his father was working as a doctor. They returned to England in 1955, to the small Suffolk town of Eye. After leaving school with few qualifications, Somers spent several years working as an Outward Bound instructor in the English Lake District and in schools in Africa, Borneo, and North America. He was then selected to work as a mountaineer and field guide for the British Antarctic Survey. He travelled some 4,000 miles by dog sled or snowmobile, mainly during the winter months, sledging amongst mountains and the frozen sea in the fjords and around the accessible islands.

He was then invited to join the 1990 International Trans-Antarctica Expedition, representing the United Kingdom, in charge of logistics and dogs. As part of the training for that, in April to June 1988, Somers with his Antarctic crossing companions and three dog teams, claimed a first by travelling 1,400 miles over the Greenland Ice Cap from the most southern part to the Humboldt glacier in the North. The expedition then successfully travelled from Seal Nunataks near the north end of the Antarctic Peninsula to reach the Russian station of Mirny on March 3, 1990, despite resupply problems as they passed the South Pole. This was the first and only crossing of Antarctica on foot, by its greatest axis, and with dogs. The 'impossible journey', as some commentators had called it, was hailed as a great success, both for its completion and its contribution to international cooperation and its message for protection of the environment.

In 1993 with a companion Craig Hetherington and little knowledge of desert travel, Somers set off to trek 1,400 miles across Western Australia from Perth to Uluru, in the continent's centre. To carry their baggage they trained three camels captured from the wild. Their 97-day journey took them through Carnegie and the Central Aboriginal Reserves. Somers set up an Outward Bound school in Borneo, and with three companions traversed Sabah, through much uncharted and perhaps unseen rainforest via the Maliau Basin, now a notable tourist area.

Somers continued his polar journeys, with several notable pioneering firsts. On 12 December 1995, with world record hot air balloonist Bill Arras, he co-piloted the first hot air balloon flight at Patriot Hills, Antarctica. In 1996 he was a guide for the first commercial ski expedition pulling supplies on individual sledges 350 miles to the North Magnetic Pole, in four weeks. The expedition pin-pointed the magnetic Pole using modern electronic instruments. In 1996/7 with Crispin Day (and Robert Swan for the first 350 miles) Somers kited from the South Geographic Pole 1,000 miles via the Ronne Ice Shelf to the Orville Coast, the first such traverse relying totally on kites and the wind. In 1997 Somers ran all the polar training in Resolute Bay, Canada for the McVities Penguin Polar Relay, the first Women's expedition to the North Pole. In 1999 he co-guided (with Victor Serov) the second ever commercially organised expedition to the South Pole with clients Fiona and Mike Thornewill, Catherine Hartley, Grahame Murphy, Veijo Merilainen, Steve Peyton, & Justin Speake. In 2001 he co-guided a polar training course in Spitsbergen for Pen Hadow's The Polar Travel Company. In 2003 he guided Martin Burton on a kite skiing expedition from the South Pole to Hercules Inlet, with Ronny Finsas. In 2005 he guided the Numis Polar Challenge Expedition, a four-man team which skied 170 miles to the South Pole in replica clothing and equipment from Captain Scott's 1911-12 Expedition. In 2012-13 he guided Henry Evans over the Last Degree to the South Pole as The International Scott Centenary Expedition.

Somers died on 18 July 2026, aged 76.
