= Vielmur-sur-Agout =

- Commune
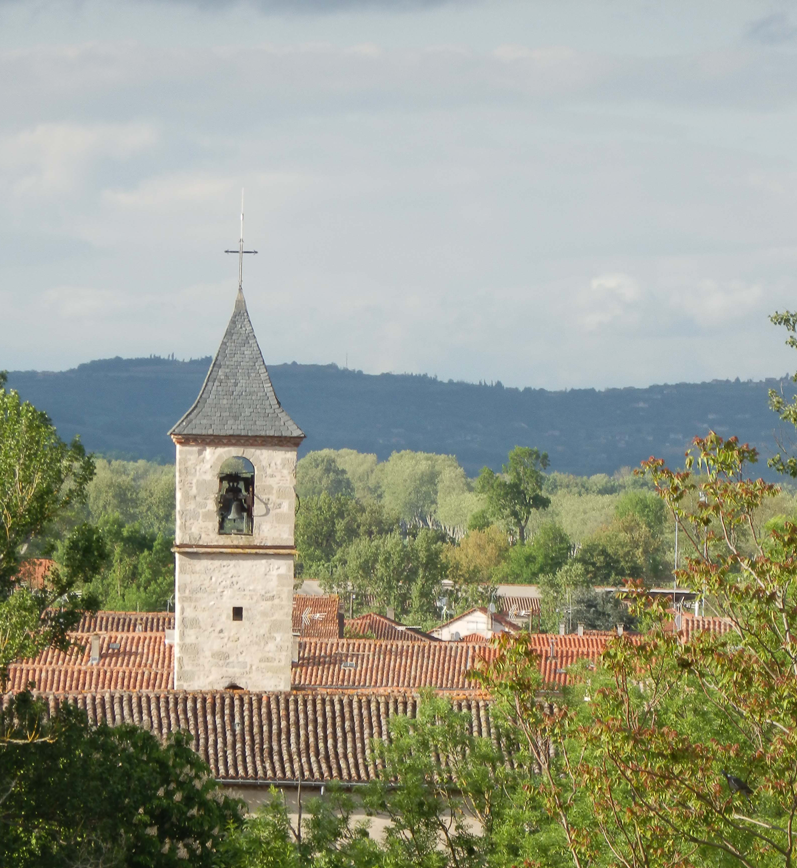
- The church tower in Vielmur-sur-Agout

- Coat of arms
- Location of Vielmur-sur-Agout
- Location within France Location within Occitanie
- Coordinates: 43°37′18″N 2°05′25″E
- Country: France
- Region: Occitania
- Department: Tarn
- Arrondissement: Castres
- Canton: Plaine de l'Agoût
- Intercommunality: Lautrécois et Pays d'Agout

Government
  - Mayor (2020–2026): Catherine Rabou
- Area^{1}: 11.61 km^{2} (4.48 sq mi)
- Elevation: 155 m (509 ft)
- Highest elevation: 195 m (640 ft)
- Lowest elevation: 145 m (476 ft)
- Population (2023): 1,375
  - Density: 118.4/km^{2} (306.7/sq mi)
- Time zone: UTC+01:00 (CET)
  - Summer (DST): UTC+02:00 (CEST)
- INSEE/Postal code: 81315 /81570
- ^{1} French Land Register data, which excludes lakes, ponds, glaciers > 1 km^{2} (0.386 sq mi or 247 acres) and river estuaries.

Vielmur-sur-Agout (French pronunciation: [vjɛlmyʁ syʁ aɡu(t)], lit. 'Vielmur on Agout'; Occitan: Vièlhmur) is a commune in the Tarn department and Occitania region of southern France.

== See also ==
- Communes of the Tarn department
