= Gennevilliers =

- Commune
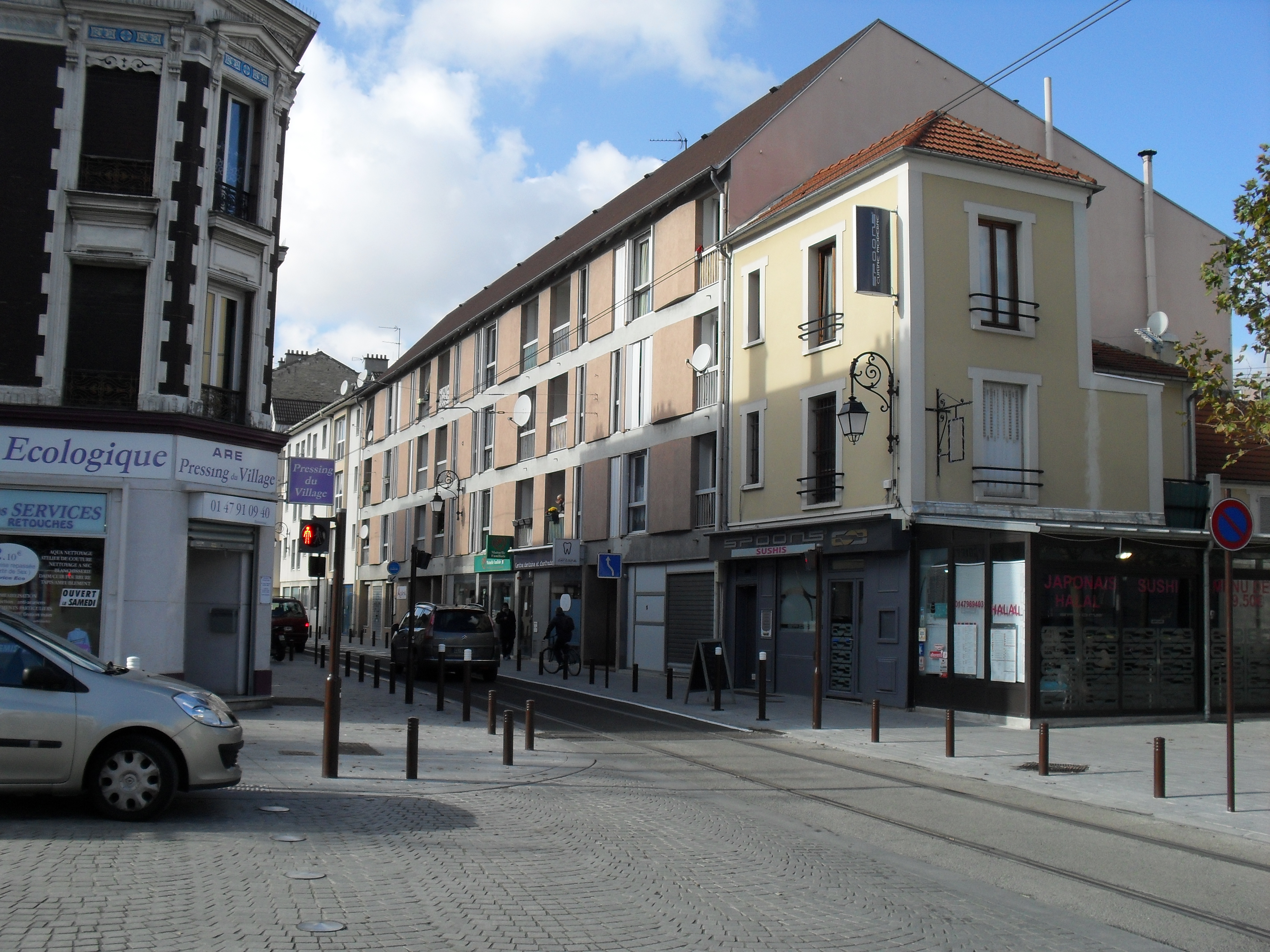
- Town centre of Gennevilliers

- Coat of arms

- Location (in red) within Paris inner suburbs
- Location of Gennevilliers
- Location within France Location within Île-de-France (region)
- Coordinates: 48°55′32″N 2°17′40″E
- Country: France
- Region: Île-de-France
- Department: Hauts-de-Seine
- Arrondissement: Nanterre
- Canton: Gennevilliers
- Intercommunality: Grand Paris

Government
  - Mayor (2026–32): Patrice Leclerc
- Area^{1}: 11.64 km^{2} (4.49 sq mi)
- Highest elevation: 33 m (108 ft)
- Lowest elevation: 21 m (69 ft)
- Population (2023): 50,979
  - Density: 4,380/km^{2} (11,340/sq mi)
- Time zone: UTC+01:00 (CET)
  - Summer (DST): UTC+02:00 (CEST)
- INSEE/Postal code: 92036 /92230
- ^{1} French Land Register data, which excludes lakes, ponds, glaciers > 1 km^{2} (0.386 sq mi or 247 acres) and river estuaries.

Gennevilliers (French pronunciation: [ʒœnvilje]) is a commune in the northwestern suburbs of Paris, in the Hauts-de-Seine department of Île-de-France. It is located 9.1 km (5.7 mi) from the centre of Paris.

== Toponymy ==
The name Gennevilliers derives from the Latin Gennovillare meaning the 'estate of Genno', a Germanic personal name.

== History ==
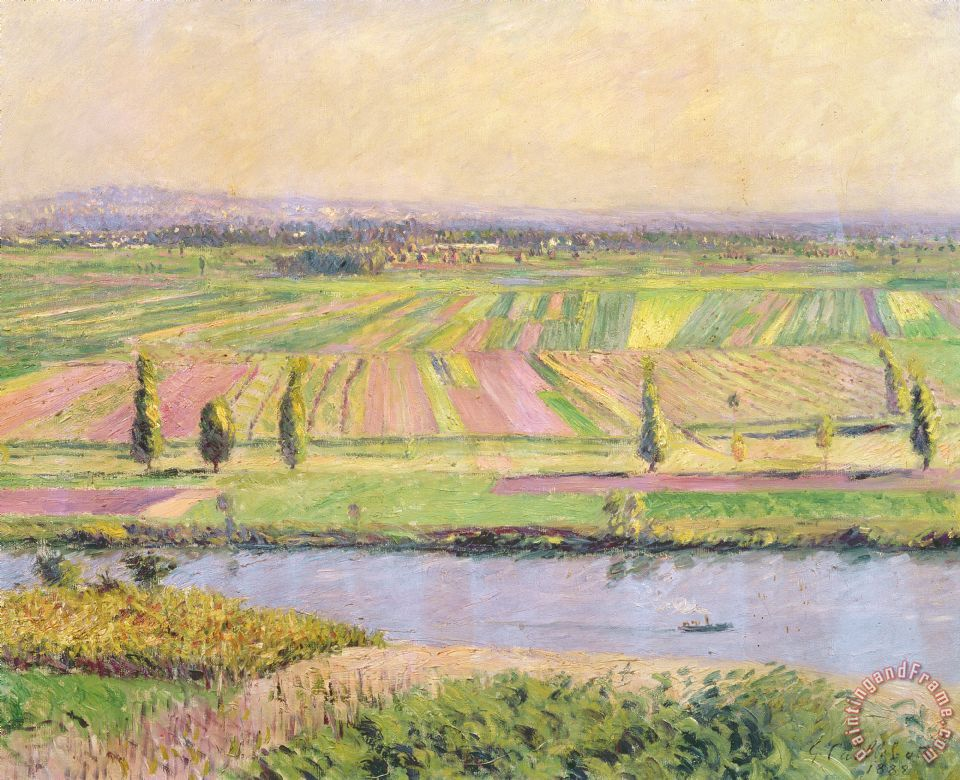
La plaine de Gennevilliers, by Gustave Caillebotte in 1888

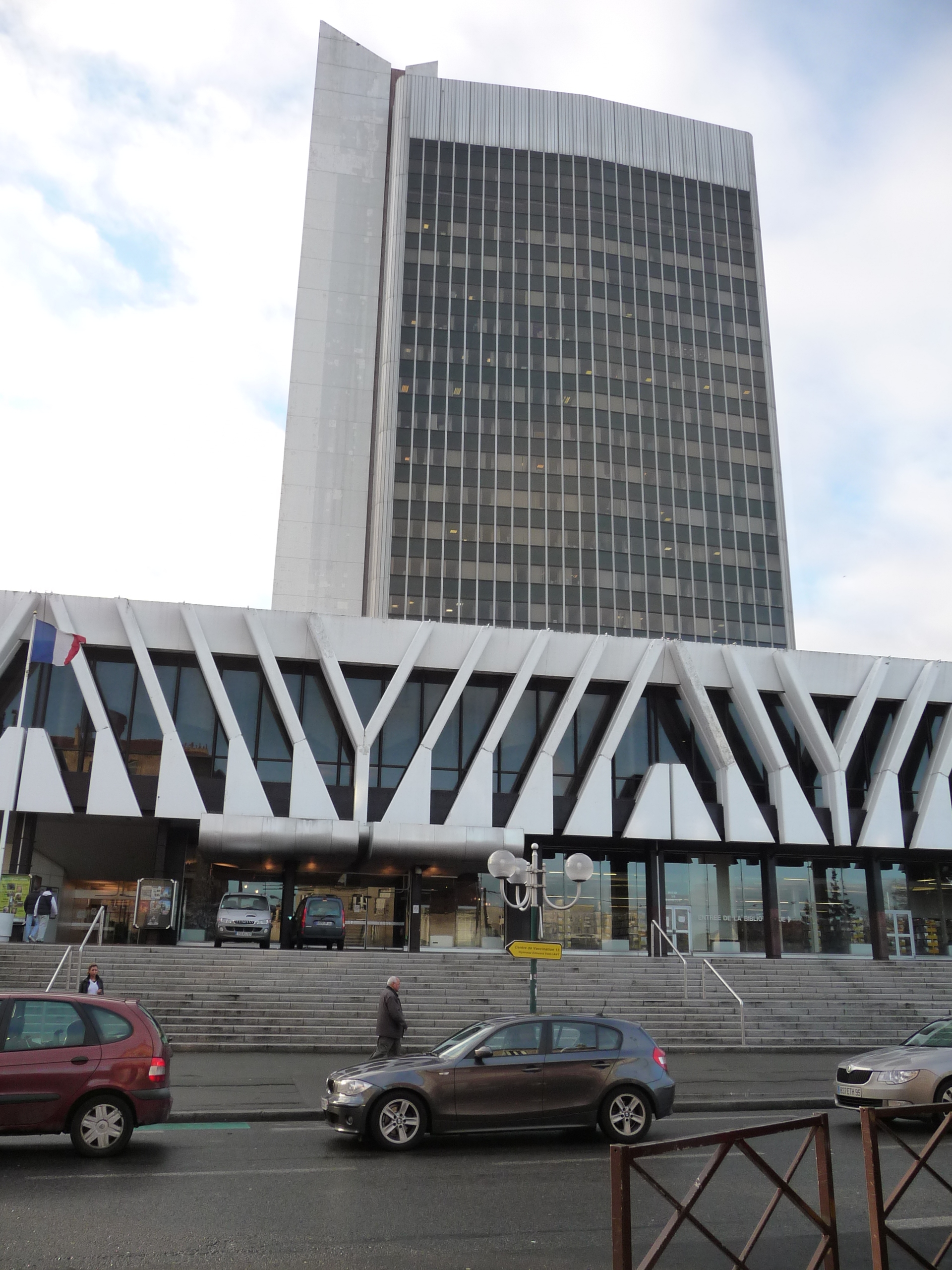
The Hôtel de Ville

On 9 April 1929, one-fifth of the territory of Gennevilliers was detached and became the commune of Villeneuve-la-Garenne. Gennevilliers is the site of the main river port Port of Gennevilliers of Paris on the Seine. The Hôtel de Ville was completed in 1977.

== Population ==
Historical population

Year	Pop.	±% p.a.
1793	1,155	—
1800	1,041	−1.47%
1806	1,005	−0.58%
1821	1,086	+0.52%
1831	1,106	+0.18%
1836	1,099	−0.13%
1841	1,115	+0.29%
1846	1,154	+0.69%
1851	1,166	+0.21%
1856	1,168	+0.03%
1861	1,630	+6.89%
1866	2,186	+6.05%
1872	1,897	−2.34%
1876	2,389	+5.93%
1881	3,245	+6.32%
1886	4,448	+6.51%
1891	5,837	+5.59%
1896	7,401	+4.86%
1901	10,056	+6.32%

Year	Pop.	±% p.a.
1906	11,586	+2.87%
1911	14,003	+3.86%
1921	18,118	+2.61%
1926	24,120	+5.89%
1931	27,250	+2.47%
1936	29,369	+1.51%
1946	25,169	−1.53%
1954	33,137	+3.50%
1962	42,595	+3.19%
1968	46,074	+1.32%
1975	50,290	+1.26%
1982	45,396	−1.45%
1990	44,818	−0.16%
1999	42,513	−0.58%
2007	41,960	−0.16%
2012	42,919	+0.45%
2017	46,907	+1.79%
2023	50,979	+1.40%

Source: EHESS and INSEE (1968-2023)

== Transport ==
Gennevilliers is served by three stations on Paris Métro Line 13: Les Courtilles, Les Agnettes and Gabriel Péri. All three are at the border with the commune of Asnières-sur-Seine.

Gennevilliers is also served by two stations on RER C (Les Grésillons and Gennevilliers), as well as five stops on Île-de-France tramway Line 1.

== Education ==
Schools in Gennevilliers include:

- 13 preschools
- 9 primary schools
- 3 junior high schools: Collège Guy-Môquet, Collège Édouard-Vaillant, Collège Louis-Pasteur

There is a senior high school, Lycée Galilée.

== Natives/residents ==
- Isabelle Adjani, actress
- Gustave Caillebotte, Impressionist painter
- Pascal Tayot, French judoka who won a silver medal at the 1992 Summer Olympics
- Thierry Vigneron, pole vault bronze medalist and former record holder
- Garra Dembélé, footballer
- Wesley Jobello, footballer
- David Ngog, footballer (Bolton Wanderers, Liverpool F.C.)
- Édouard Roger-Vasselin, tennis player
- Jeanine Claes, dancer

== Twin towns – sister cities ==
Gennevilliers is twinned with:

- La Bañeza, Spain
- Bergkamen, Germany
- Al-Bireh, Palestine
- Imola, Italy
- Ostrowiec Świętokrzyski, Poland
- Wirral, England, United Kingdom

Trostianets, Ukraine

== See also ==
- Communes of the Hauts-de-Seine department
