= Saint-Ouen station =

Saint-Ouen station could refer to two railway stations in Paris:

- Saint-Ouen station (Paris Metro), on the Paris Metro
- Saint-Ouen station (Paris RER), on the Réseau Express Régional
