= Arrondissement of Saint-Denis, Seine-Saint-Denis =

Coordinates: 48°56′01″N 2°21′23″E

Saint-Denis
- Arrondissement
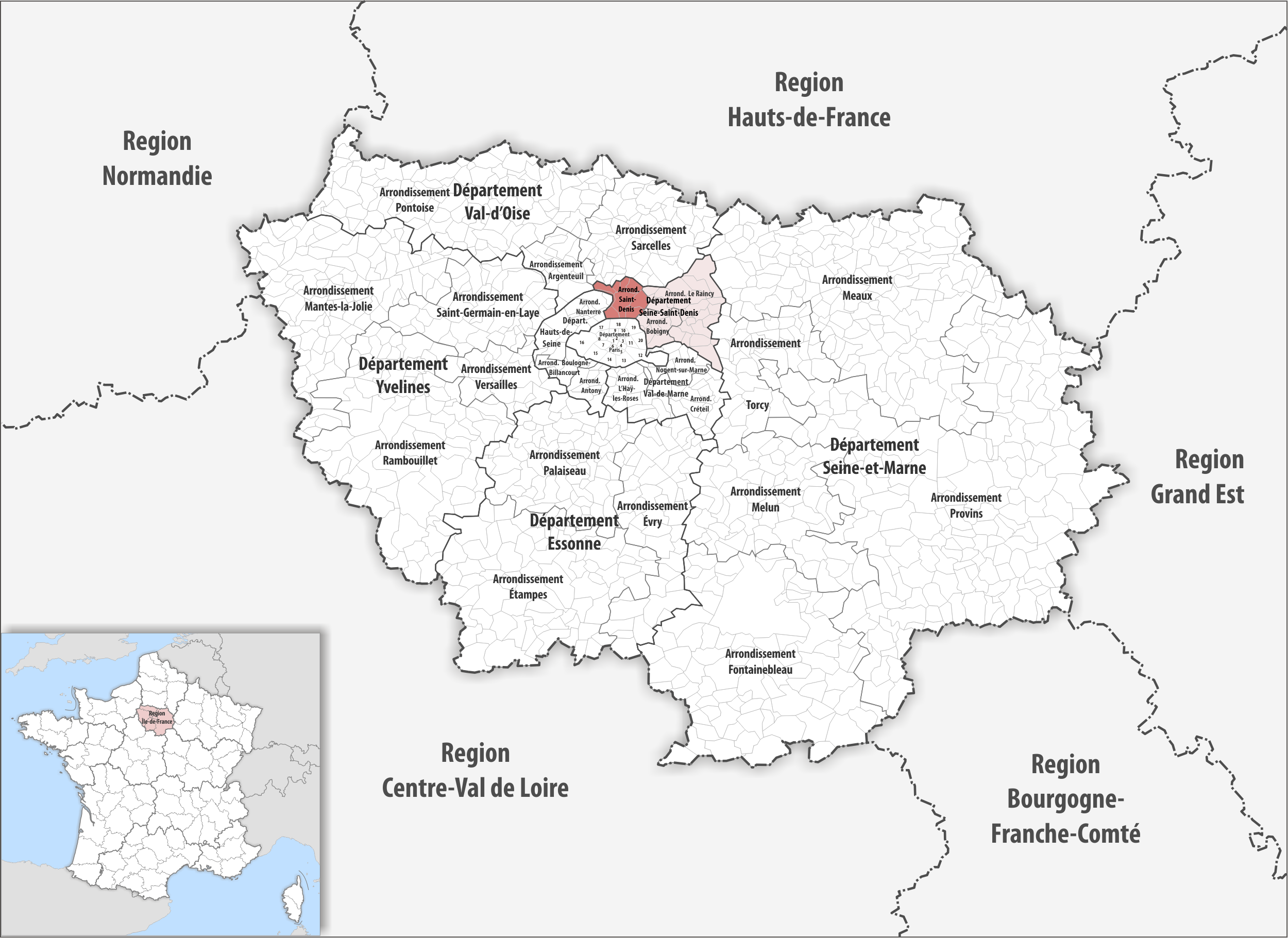
- Location within the region Île-de-France
- Country: France
- Region: Île-de-France
- Department: Seine-Saint-Denis
- No. of communes: {{{nbcomm}}}
- Area: 47.4 km^{2} (18.3 sq mi)
- Population (2023): 453,671
  - Density: 9,570/km^{2} (24,800/sq mi)
- INSEE code: 933

The arrondissement of Saint-Denis (French: arrondissement de Saint-Denis) is an arrondissement (district) of France in the Seine-Saint-Denis department, Île-de-France. It has 8 communes. Its population is 451,934 (2021), and its area is 47.4 km^{2} (18.3 sq mi).

== Composition ==
The communes of the arrondissement of Saint-Denis, and their INSEE codes, are:

1. Aubervilliers (93001)
2. La Courneuve (93027)
3. Épinay-sur-Seine (93031)
4. L'Île-Saint-Denis (93039)
5. Saint-Denis (93066)
6. Saint-Ouen-sur-Seine (93070)
7. Stains (93072)
8. Villetaneuse (93079)

== History ==
The arrondissement of Saint-Denis was created in February 1993 from part of the arrondissement of Bobigny.

As a result of the reorganisation of the cantons of France which came into effect in 2015, the borders of the cantons are no longer related to the borders of the arrondissements. The cantons of the arrondissement of Saint-Denis were, as of January 2015:

1. Aubervilliers-Est
2. Aubervilliers-Ouest
3. La Courneuve
4. Épinay-sur-Seine
5. Pierrefitte-sur-Seine
6. Saint-Denis-Nord-Est
7. Saint-Denis-Nord-Ouest
8. Saint-Denis-Sud
9. Saint-Ouen
10. Stains
