= Hôtel de Ville, Saint-Ouen-sur-Seine =

Town hall in Saint-Ouen-sur-Seine, France

Hôtel de Ville
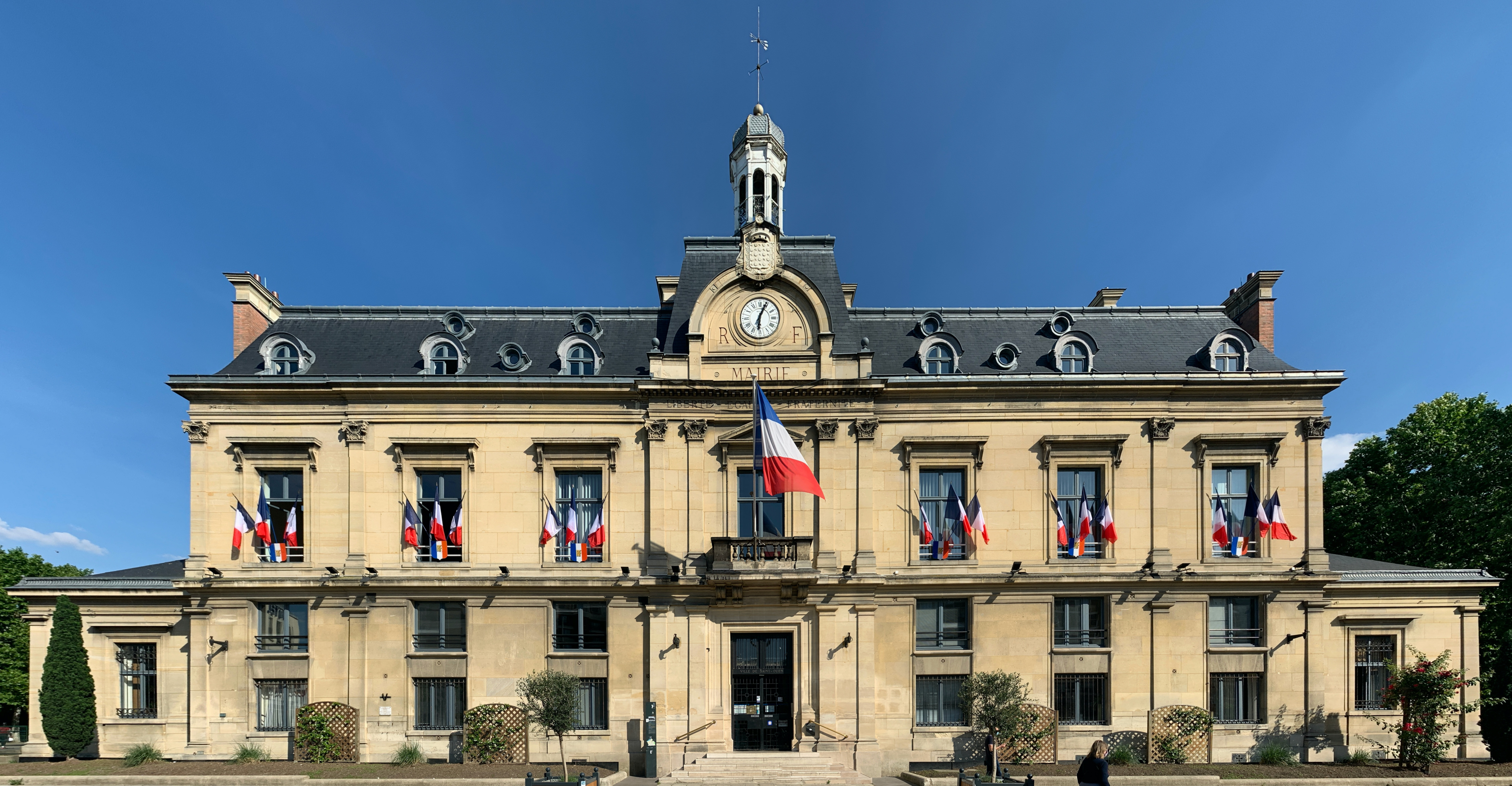
- The main frontage of the Hôtel de Ville in May 2020
- Interactive map of the Hôtel de Ville area

General information
- Type: City hall
- Architectural style: Neoclassical style
- Location: Saint-Ouen-sur-Seine, France
- Coordinates: 48.9117°N 2.3344°E
- Completed: 1868

Design and construction
- Architect: Paul-Eugène Lequeux

The Hôtel de Ville (French pronunciation: [otɛl də vil], City Hall) is a municipal building in Saint-Ouen-sur-Seine, Seine-Saint-Denis, in the northern suburbs of Paris, standing on Place de la République.

== History ==
After the French Revolution, meetings of the town council were initially held in the house of the mayor at the time. The council relocated to a rented building close to the Church of Saint-Ouen-le-Vieux from 1806, and then moved to the clergy house belonging to the church in 1826. The local school and teacher's flat formed part of the building. In 1840, the town council reverted to holding its meetings in the house of the mayor, who at that time was Marquis Louis-Joseph du Planty.

Following boundary changes which extended the commune to the south, the council led by the mayor, Alexis Godillot, decided to commission a new town hall located more central to the enlarged commune. The site they selected on Place de la République had earlier been known as the Maison Blanche or the Croix de Bois. The foundation stone for the new building was laid in 1866. It was designed by Paul-Eugène Lequeux in the neoclassical style, built in ashlar stone and was completed in 1868.

The original design involved a symmetrical main frontage of seven bays facing onto Place de la République. The central bay, which was slightly projected forward, featured a short flight of steps leading up to a doorway with a moulded surround, flanked by pairs of Doric order pilasters supporting a cornice. On the first floor, there was a French door with a balustraded balcony and a pediment, flanked by pairs of composite order pilasters supporting an entablature and another cornice. Above the central bay, there was a clock with an ornate surround, behind which there was a steep roof and an octagonal lantern. The other bays were fenestrated by pairs of windows, stacked on top of each other, on the ground floor and by casement windows with cornices on the first floor. There were also dormer windows at attic level. Internally, the principal rooms were the Salle du Conseil (council chamber), and the Salle du Bureau Municipal (municipal office), both on the first floor. Two single-storey end bays, which were slightly recessed from the main block, were added to the main structure in 1885.

The council chamber was decorated with murals by Paul Gervais, installed in 1919, and a bust depicting the politician, Jean Jaurès, was sculpted by André Verdilhan and installed on the grand staircase in 1920. Meanwhile, the municipal office was decorated with murals by Jean Julien, installed in 1931.

During the Paris insurrection, part the Second World War, elements of the French Resistance seized the town hall on 19 August 1944. A young fireman, René Mary, was killed by German troops in a skirmish in Rue Diderot, adjacent to the town hall, on 20 August 1944. This was five days in advance of the official liberation of the town by the French 2nd Armoured Division, commanded by General Philippe Leclerc, on 25 August 1944.
