= Saint-Ouen-sur-Seine =

- Commune
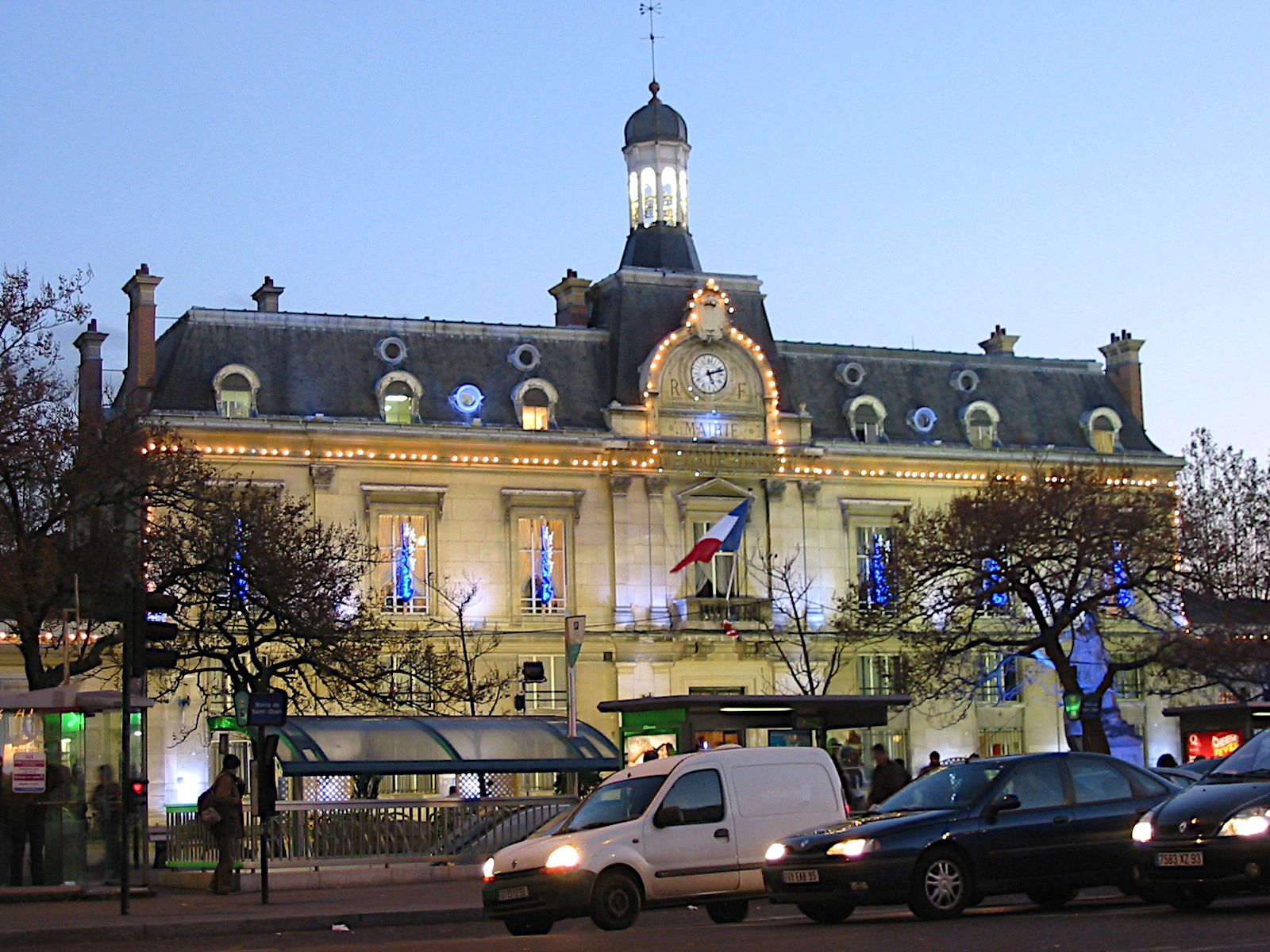
- The Hôtel de Ville

- Coat of arms

- Location (in red) within Paris inner suburbs
- Location of Saint-Ouen-sur-Seine
- Location within France Location within Île-de-France (region)
- Coordinates: 48°54′44″N 2°20′03″E
- Country: France
- Region: Île-de-France
- Department: Seine-Saint-Denis
- Arrondissement: Saint-Denis
- Canton: Saint-Ouen-sur-Seine
- Intercommunality: Grand Paris

Government
  - Mayor (2026–32): Karim Bouamrane
- Area^{1}: 4.31 km^{2} (1.66 sq mi)
- Population (2023): 53,615
  - Density: 12,400/km^{2} (32,200/sq mi)
- Demonym: Audonian
- Time zone: UTC+01:00 (CET)
  - Summer (DST): UTC+02:00 (CEST)
- INSEE/Postal code: 93070 /93400
- ^{1} French Land Register data, which excludes lakes, ponds, glaciers > 1 km^{2} (0.386 sq mi or 247 acres) and river estuaries.

Saint-Ouen-sur-Seine (French pronunciation: [sɛ̃t‿wɛ̃ syʁ sɛn]; literally "St. Audoin on Seine") is a commune in the northern suburbs of Paris, France, located 6.6 kilometres (4.1 miles) from the centre of Paris. It is part of the Seine-Saint-Denis department, in the Île-de-France region, and of the Métropole du Grand Paris. The commune was called Saint-Ouen until 2018, when it obtained a change of name by ministerial order.

The communes neighbouring Saint-Ouen-sur-Seine are Paris, to the south, Clichy, to the west, Villeneuve-la-Garenne, Gennevilliers and L'Île-Saint-Denis, to the north, and Saint-Denis to the east. The commune of Saint-Ouen-sur-Seine is part of the canton of Saint-Ouen-sur-Seine, which also includes L'Île-Saint-Denis and part of Épinay-sur-Seine. Saint-Ouen also includes the Cimetière de Saint-Ouen.

== History ==
The town was named after Saint Audoin, a famous 7th century AD Frankish bishop. On 1 January 1860, the city of Paris was enlarged by annexing neighbouring communes. On that occasion, a part of the commune of Saint-Ouen was annexed to the city of Paris. At the same time, the commune of La Chapelle-Saint-Denis was disbanded and divided between the city of Paris, Saint-Ouen, Saint-Denis, and Aubervilliers. Saint-Ouen received a small part of the territory of La Chapelle-Saint-Denis. The commune of Montmartre was also disbanded; the city of Paris annexed most of Montmartre, but Saint-Ouen did receive a small northern part of the territory of that commune. The Hôtel de Ville was completed in 1868.

== Population ==
Historical population

Year	Pop.	±% p.a.
1793	845	—
1800	602	−4.73%
1806	649	+1.26%
1821	612	−0.39%
1831	981	+4.83%
1836	983	+0.04%
1841	1,196	+4.00%
1846	1,316	+1.93%
1851	1,507	+2.75%
1856	2,262	+8.46%
1861	3,294	+7.81%
1866	5,804	+12.00%
1872	8,091	+5.69%
1876	11,255	+8.60%
1881	17,718	+9.50%
1886	21,404	+3.85%
1891	25,969	+3.94%
1896	30,715	+3.41%
1901	35,436	+2.90%

Year	Pop.	±% p.a.
1906	37,866	+1.34%
1911	41,904	+2.05%
1921	50,848	+1.95%
1926	52,467	+0.63%
1931	53,146	+0.26%
1936	51,106	−0.78%
1946	45,465	−1.16%
1954	48,112	+0.71%
1962	51,956	+0.97%
1968	48,886	−1.01%
1975	43,588	−1.63%
1982	43,606	+0.01%
1990	42,343	−0.37%
1999	39,722	−0.71%
2007	43,954	+1.27%
2012	47,499	+1.56%
2017	51,108	+1.48%
2023	53,615	+0.80%

Source: EHESS and INSEE (1968-2023)

== Flea market ==
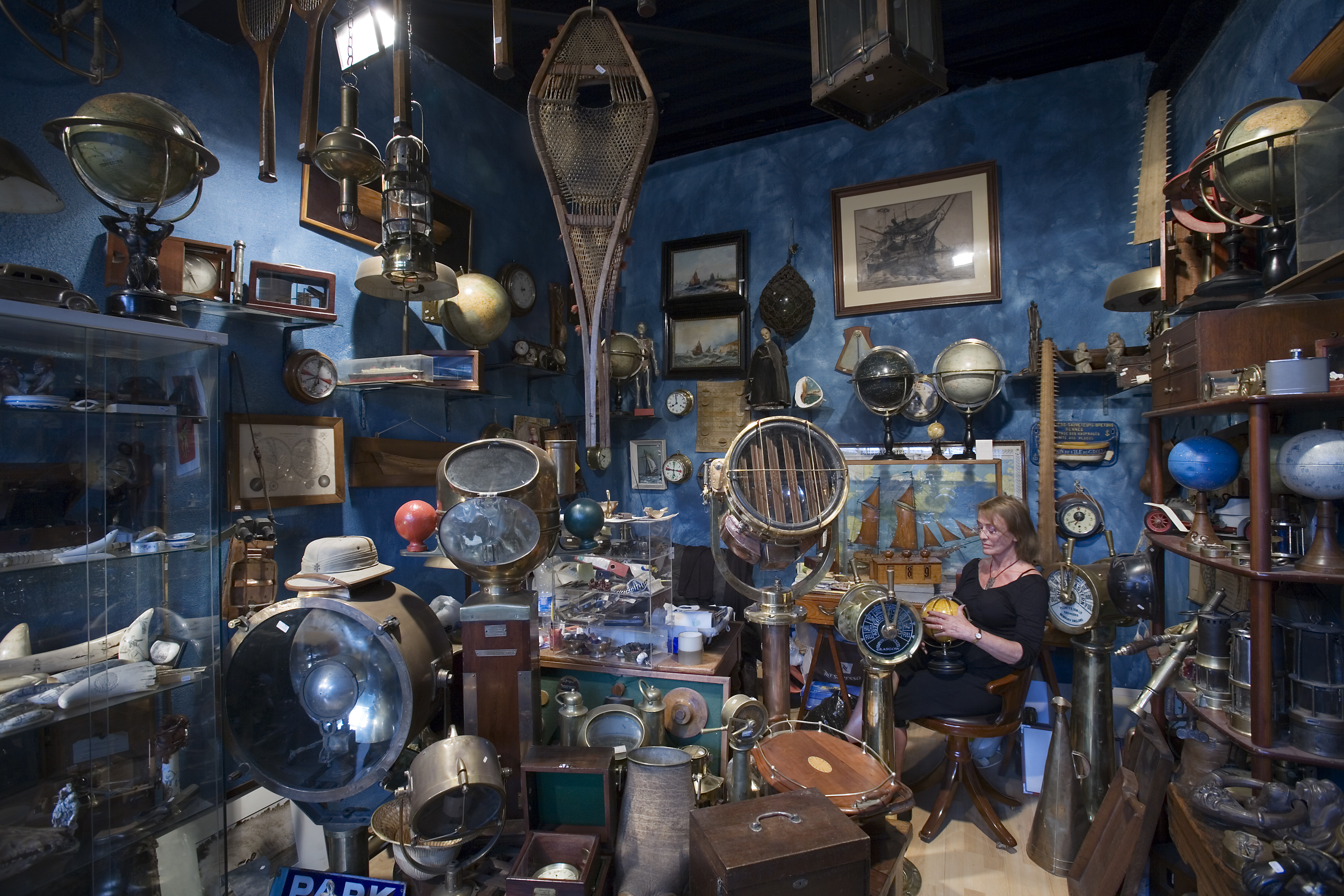
A vintage travel gear seller at Marché Dauphine

Saint-Ouen-sur-Seine is home to the Saint-Ouen flea market, the highest concentration of antique dealers and second-hand furniture dealers in the world, drawing around 11 million visitors a year. The flea market (marché aux puces) is held every Saturday, Sunday, and Monday; because of this high frequency, compared to other flea markets, it has tended to consist only of professionals who rent their spot for a minimum term of three years. In 2014, the flea market site was acquired by Jean-Cyrille Boutmy from Gerald Grosvenor, 6th Duke of Westminster.

== Transport ==
Saint-Ouen-sur-Seine is served by three stations of the Paris Metro: Garibaldi (line 13), Saint-Ouen (line 14 and RER line C) and Mairie de Saint-Ouen (lines 13 and 14).

== Government and infrastructure ==
The commune has the head office of the Agency for French Education Abroad (AEFE).

== Education ==
=== Primary and secondary schools ===
Saint-Ouen-sur-Seine has:

- 3 school groups of preschools and primary schools
- 9 pre-schools
- 8 primary schools
- 3 "collèges" (lower secondary schools)
  - Collège Jean Jaurès
  - Collège Joséphine Baker
  - Collège Jules Michelet
- 2 high schools/Sixth-form colleges (lycées)
  - Lycée Marcel Cachin
  - Lycée Auguste Blanqui

=== Further and higher education ===
Supméca, an accredited mechanical engineering school is located in the Vieux Saint Ouen quarter. It was created in 1948, is member of the university of Paris-Seine and now part of the ISAE Group, which has a total of 6000 students. One literary and humanities Classe préparatoire aux grandes écoles is offered on the Lycée Blanqui high school's premises. The business school Audencia opened a campus in Saint-Ouen in 2023.

== Notable people ==
- Jacques Gondouin (1737–1818), architect
- Alphonse Halimi (1932–2006), boxer
- Louis Stettner (1922–2016), American photographer of "everyday poetry"
- Karim Bouamrane (b. 1973), politician
- Dany Bill (b. 1973), seven-times Muaythai world champion.
- Benjamin Cuq (b. 1974), journalist-writer
- Abdoulaye Soumare (b. 1980), footballer
- Djimi Traore (b. 1980), footballer
- Richard Clayderman (b. 1953), pianist
- Tchavolo Schmitt (b. 1954), manouche swing guitarist (Porte de Montreuil and Chope des Puces)
- Éric Angelvy (b. 1968), racing driver
- Nosfell (b. 1977), musician

== Sport ==
The Stade de Paris (also called the Stade Bauer) is located in the town. The stadium is home to football team Red Star.

== Twin towns – sister cities ==
Saint-Ouen is twinned with:

- Terni, Italy
- Salford, England, United Kingdom
- Ruse, Bulgaria
- Podolsk, Russia

== See also ==
- Church of Saint-Ouen-le-Vieux, Roman Catholic
- Cimetière de Saint-Ouen, Saint-Ouen cemetery
- Communes of the Seine-Saint-Denis department
