= L'Île-Saint-Denis =

- Commune
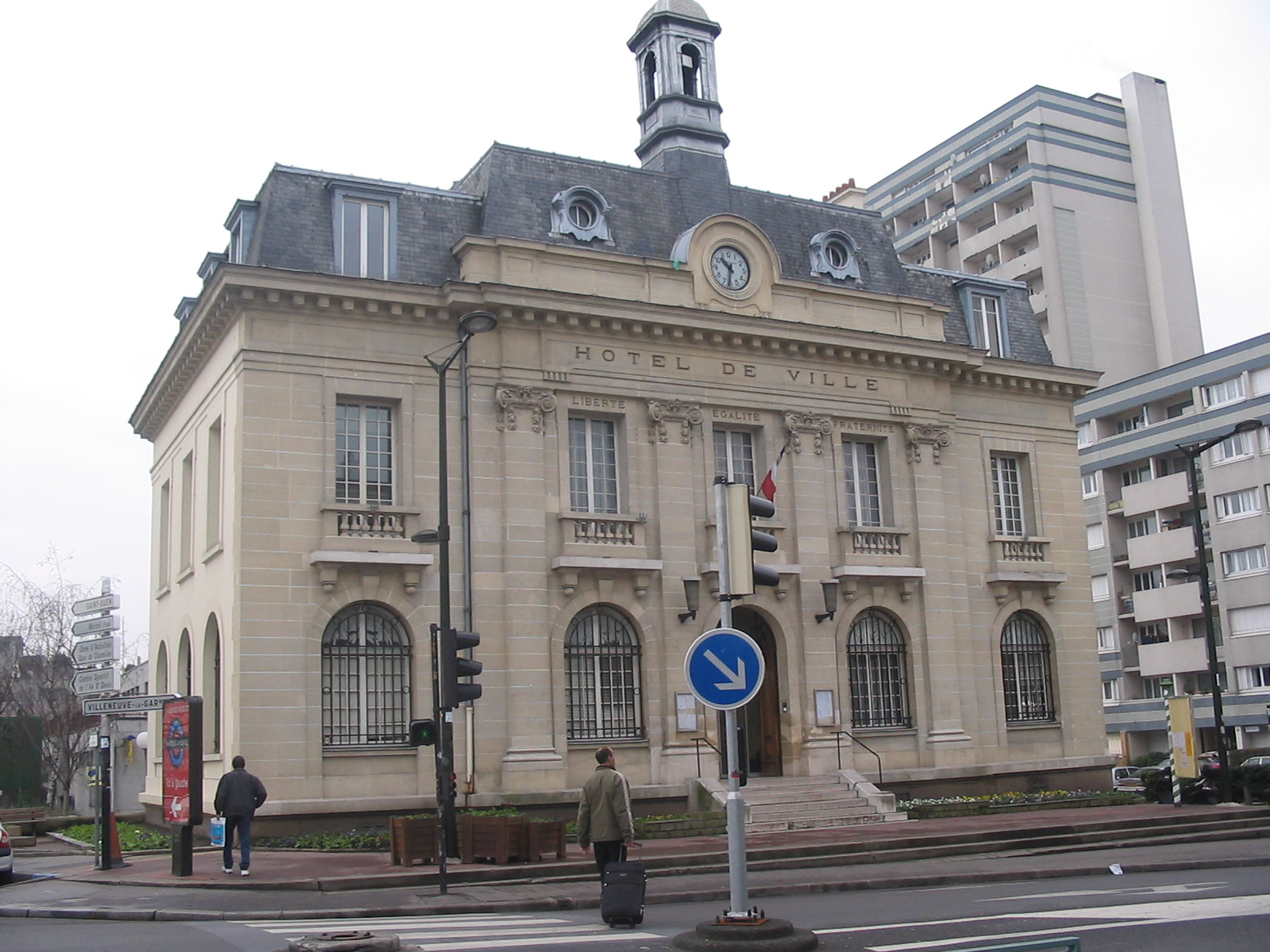
- The town hall of L'Île-Saint-Denis

- Coat of arms

- Location (in red) within Paris inner suburbs
- Location of L'Île-Saint-Denis
- Location within France Location within Île-de-France (region)
- Coordinates: 48°56′00″N 2°20′00″E
- Country: France
- Region: Île-de-France
- Department: Seine-Saint-Denis
- Arrondissement: Saint-Denis
- Canton: Saint-Ouen-sur-Seine
- Intercommunality: Grand Paris

Government
  - Mayor (2026–32): Mohamed Gnabaly
- Area^{1}: 1.77 km^{2} (0.68 sq mi)
- Population (2023): 8,696
  - Density: 4,910/km^{2} (12,700/sq mi)
- Demonym: Îlodionysiens
- Time zone: UTC+01:00 (CET)
  - Summer (DST): UTC+02:00 (CEST)
- INSEE/Postal code: 93039 /93450
- Website: www.lile-saint-denis.fr
- ^{1} French Land Register data, which excludes lakes, ponds, glaciers > 1 km^{2} (0.386 sq mi or 247 acres) and river estuaries.

L'Île-Saint-Denis (French: [lil sɛ̃ d(ə)ni]; lit. 'Saint Denis Island') is a French commune in the northern suburbs of Paris, Île-de-France. It is located 9.4 km (5.8 mi) from the centre of Paris.

The commune is entirely contained on an island of the Seine, hence its name.

Along with the communes of Saint-Denis and Saint-Ouen-sur-Seine, L'Île-Saint-Denis formed the Olympic Village of the 2024 Summer Olympics. This allowed 85% of athletes to be 30 minutes from their competition venues.

== Heraldry ==
Arms of l'Île-Saint-Denis	The arms of l'Île-Saint-Denis are blazoned : Azure, a castle argent pierced and masoned sable extended by walls argent masoned sable, open of the field, and on a chief Or, a cross gules between 4 alerions azure.

== Transport ==
Several transit connections are located nearby. The closest station to l'Île-Saint-Denis is Saint-Denis station, which is an interchange station on Paris RER line D and on the Transilien Paris – Nord suburban rail line. This station is located in the neighboring commune of Saint-Denis, 0.4 km (0.25 mi) from the town center of l'Île-Saint-Denis.

Tram T1 stops near Île-Saint-Denis's town hall. Bus route 237 runs along the length of the island.

== Demographics ==
The island is the result of the joining of several smaller islands (which helps explain its current length): L'île Saint-Denis, l'île Saint-Ouen, l'île des Vannes and l'île du Châtelier.

Since the 1960s l'Île-Saint-Denis has housed immigrants, mostly from North African countries. Nadir Dendoune, a local author, said that l'Île-Saint-Denis had racial and ethnic diversity in the 1980s, as the neighborhood housed various groups of poor people, including Arabs, Black people, ethnic French, and other Europeans, and that at that time half of the students in area schools were White. In 2005, according to Dendoune, few of the students were White.

Historical population
Year	Pop.	±% p.a.
1968	5,522	—
1975	7,004	+3.45%
1982	7,435	+0.86%
1990	7,413	−0.04%
1999	6,810	−0.94%
2007	7,083	+0.49%
2012	6,981	−0.29%
2017	7,981	+2.71%
2023	8,696	+1.44%
Source: INSEE

== Education ==
There are three primary schools in the commune: École Samira Bellil, École Paul Langevin, and École Jean Lurçat.

Collège Alfred Sisley, a junior high school, is on the island.

== See also ==
- Communes of the Seine-Saint-Denis department
