= Olivier Beaudry =

French karateka (born 1977)

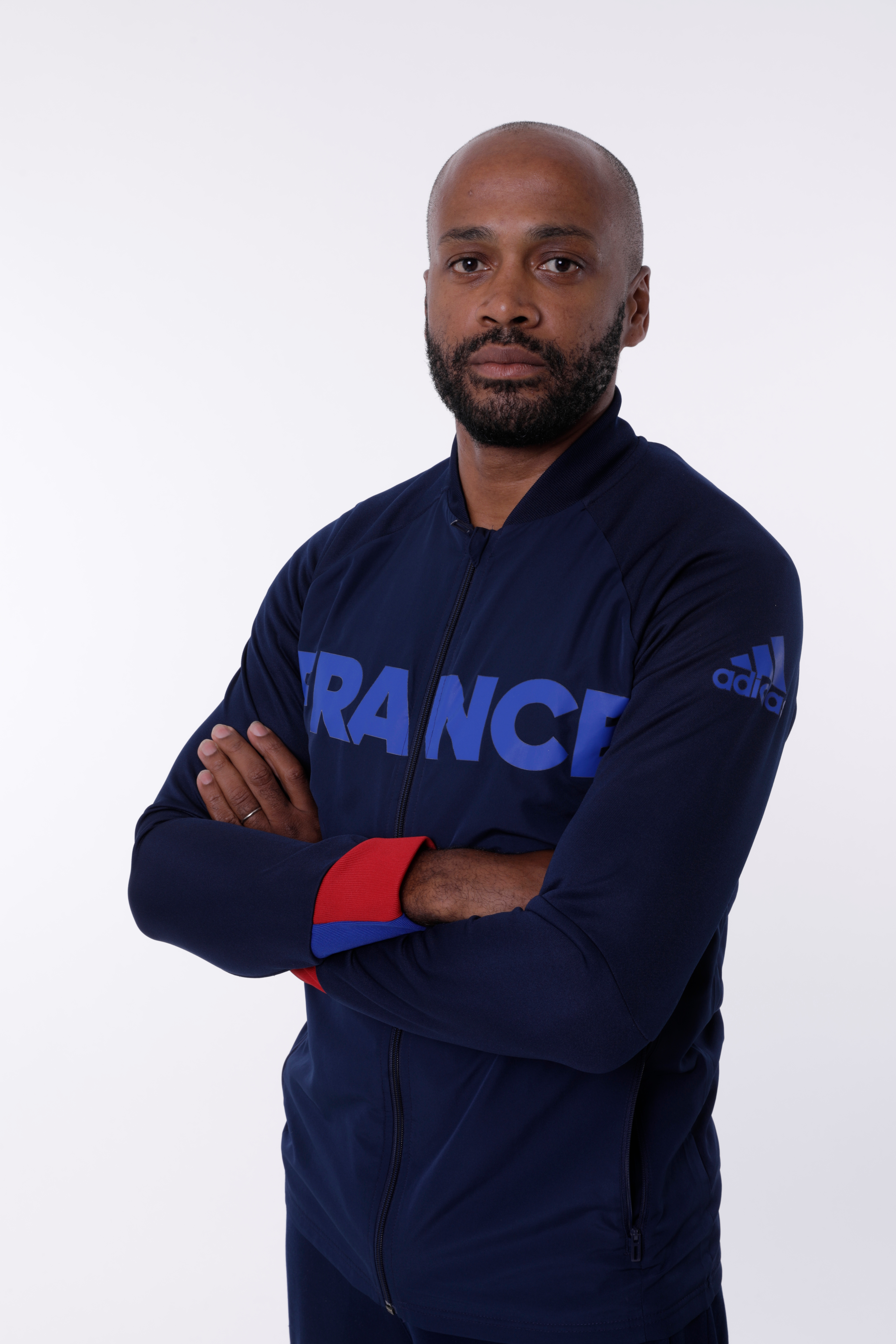
Olivier Beaudry

Olivier Beaudry (born 17 November 1977 in Epinay-sur-Seine, France) is a French karateka who won multiple medals at the European Karate Championships from 2001 to 2006.

- Gold medalist at the 2006 European Karate Championships at Men's Kumite, 75kg
- Gold medalist at the 2004 European Karate Championships at Men's Kumite, 75kg
- Silver medalist at the 2003 European Karate Championships at Men's Kumite, Open
- Bronze medalist at the 2001 European Karate Championships at the Men's Kumite, 75kg
