= Saint-Ouen station (Paris RER) =

Railway station in Saint-Ouen, France

Coordinates: 48°54′19″N 2°19′21″E

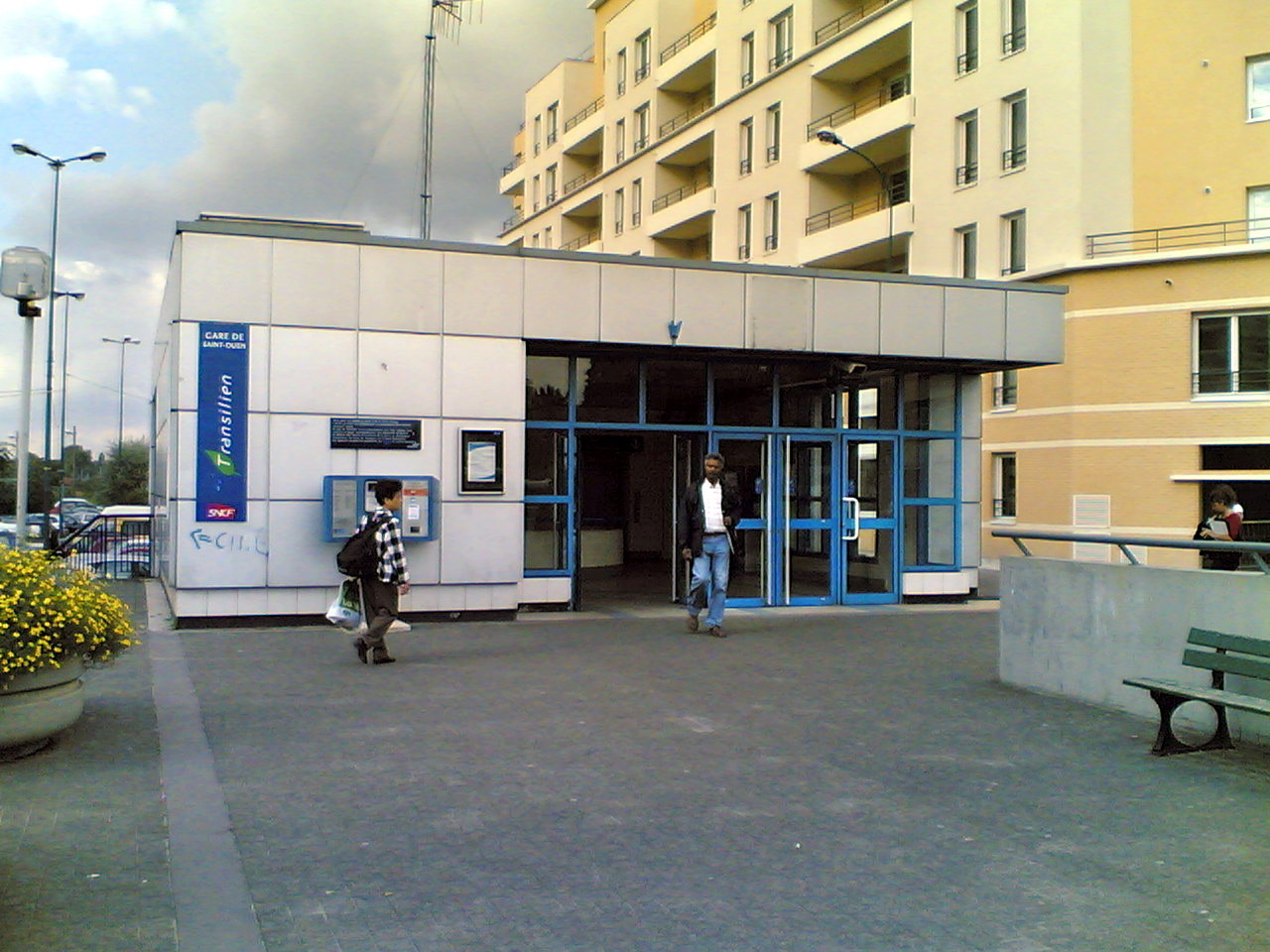
Entrance

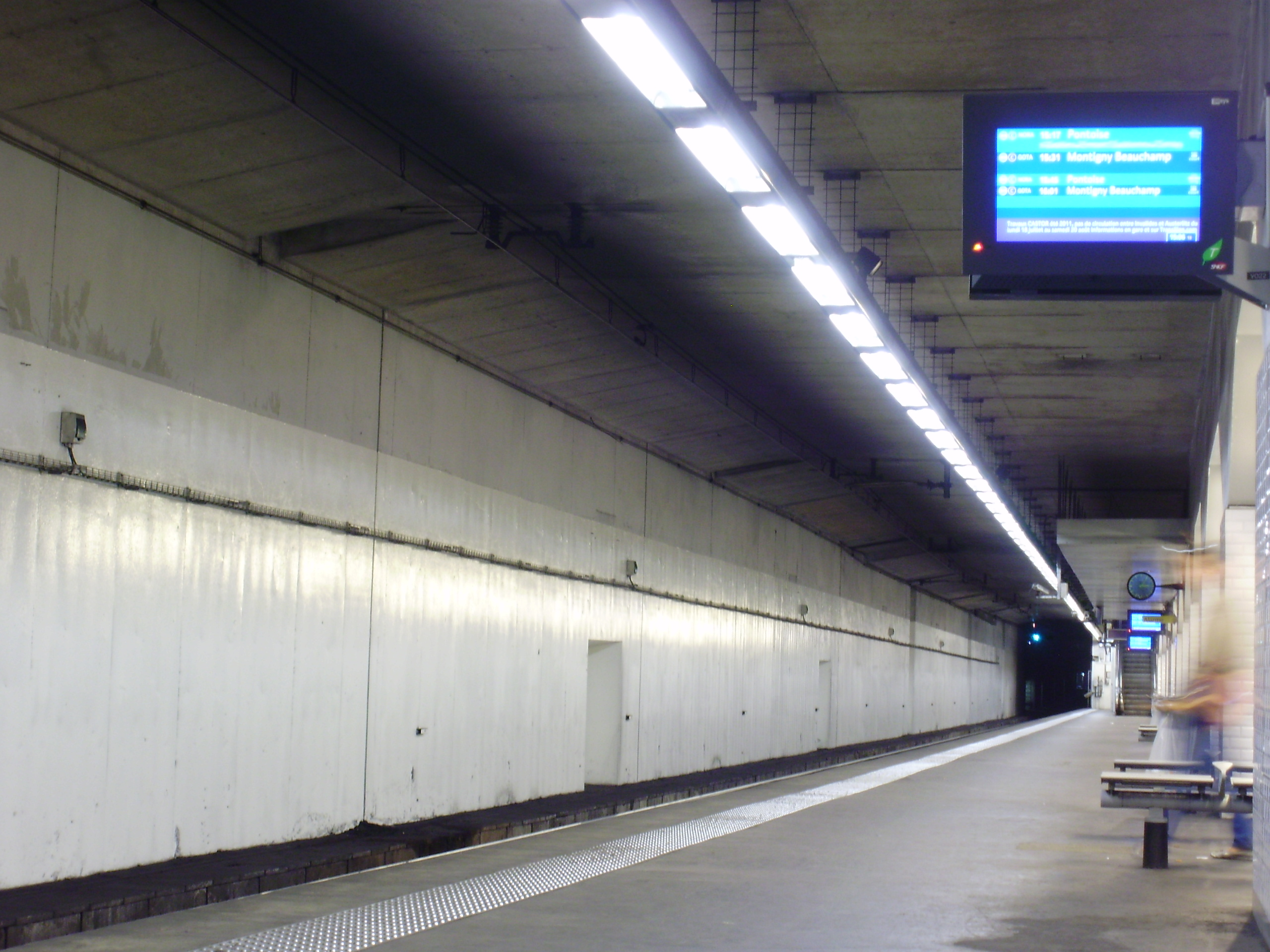
The station platforms

Saint-Ouen is a station in Paris' express suburban rail system, the RER. It is situated in Saint-Ouen, in the département of Seine-Saint-Denis. The construction of the metro station permitted connections with the Paris Métro Line 14 at Saint-Ouen station

== See also ==
- List of Réseau Express Régional stations

Preceding station	RER	Following station
Les Grésillons towards Pontoise	RER C	Porte de Clichy towards Massy-Palaiseau or Dourdan-la-Forêt
