= Benjamin Cuq =

French journalist (born 1974)

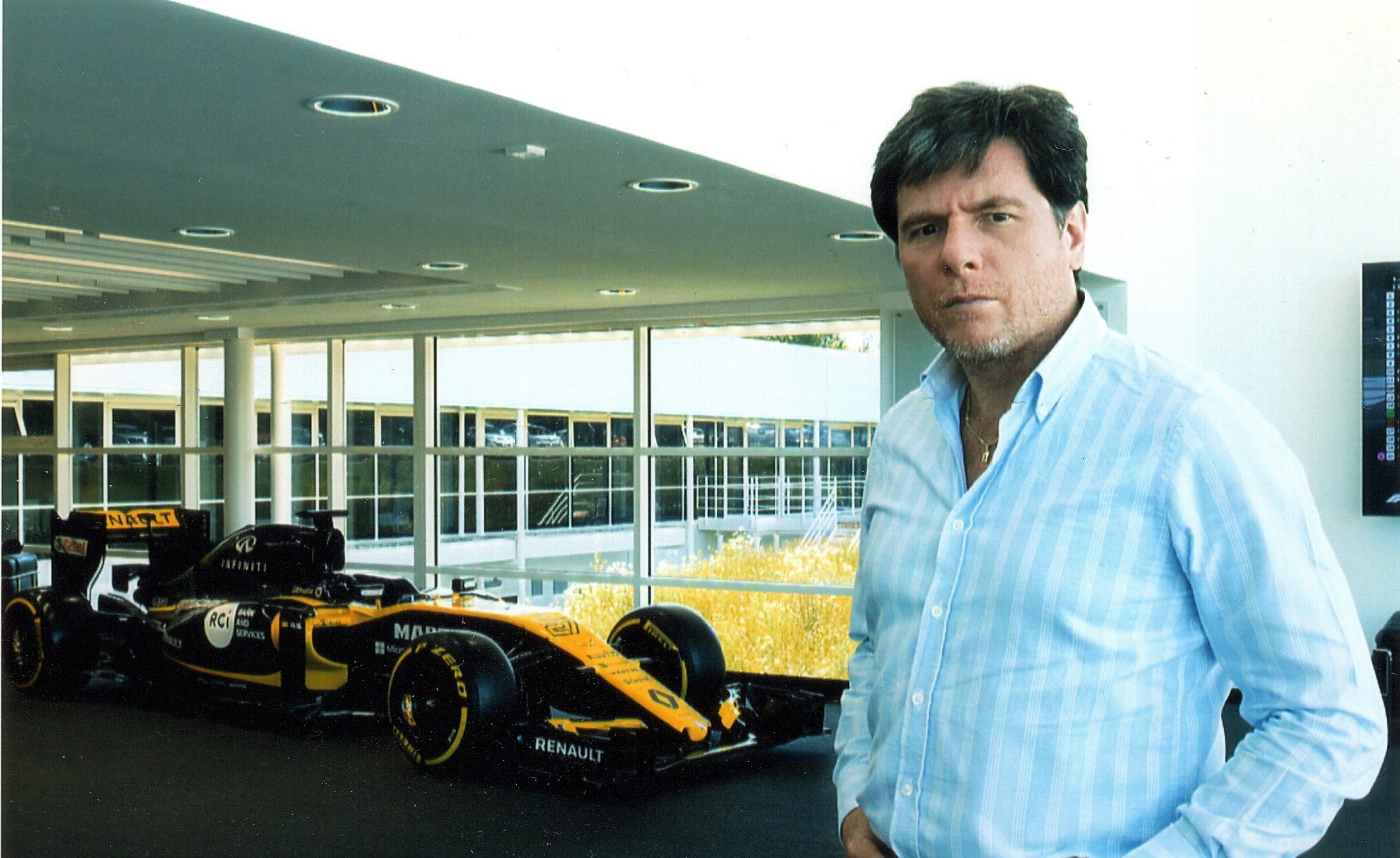
- Cuq next to a Renault Formula 1"
- Born: Benjamin René Pierre Cuq; 24 November 1974 (age 50); Saint-Ouen, Seine-Saint-Denis, France
- Occupation(s): Journalist, writer
- Years active: 1996–present

Benjamin René Pierre Cuq (born 24 November 1974) is a French journalist and writer.

== Career ==
After being in high school in Ecole internationale bilingue and studying sociology at Saint-Denis University, Benjamin Cuq became journalist for the press magazine (Télé 7 Jours) in May 1996. In 1999, he began working on the first French edition of FHM as deputy editor. He has worked for many French magazines and newspapers such as France Dimanche, Ici Paris, Union, Télé Star, Marianne, France Soir, and now Le Parisien Capital and Management.

In May 2004, he wrote a biographical book, Queen de A à Z, which only sold 3000 copies. In November 2005, a new edition of the book was published, with a new cover.

In September 2011, Cuq became editor / project manager of the program, L'Hebdo des JT, produced by Revon & Gateau Productions on behalf of Planète+, the documentary TV channel of the Canal+ group. Since September 2012, he has published auto testings for the Le Parisien weekly supplement. In October 2012, he launched, with French journalist Anthony Martin, the film magazine, See. He also wrote some "Nous nous sommes tant aimés", documentaries about French stars, produced by Revon et Gateau Productions. In October 2013, Benjamin Cuq published his second book, Le Livre Noir de Renault ("The Black Book of Renault"). The book got four stars in an Amazon poll. Cuq writes the dark side of the story of Renault: how Louis Renault met Adolf Hitler and worked with the Nazis. The novel goes into Renault's car model failures and why they failed, Renault American history, the murder of worker Pierre Overney, and the assassination of Renault chairman Georges Besse by Action directe.

== Filmography ==
On 1 May 2012, experimental filmmaker and French director Gérard Courant filmed Benjamin Cuq for one of his Cinématon chapters, the number 2623.

== Bibliography ==
- Queen de A à Z, Éditions Prélude et Fugue – Collection Music Book, Paris May 2004
- Le Livre noir de Renault, First Éditions, Paris, October 2013
- Mustang Passion, Éditions Glénat, Paris, October 2016
- Corvette Passion, Éditions Glénat, Paris, October 2017
- Citroen Une Passion Française with Matthieu Turel, Éditions EPA, Paris, October 2018
- Volkswagen Golf, Éditions EPA, Paris, February 2019
- Carlos Ghosn Autopsie d'un désastre, First Éditions, Paris, November 2020
