= Cinématon =

1978 film directed by Gérard Courant

- Directed by: Gérard Courant
- Release date: November 2009
- Running time: 157 hours

Cinématon is a 214-hour-long experimental film by French director Gérard Courant (157-hour-long when it was fully aired in 2009.

It was the longest film ever released until 2011. Composed over 50 years from 1978 and still ongoing in 2026, it consists of a series of over 3,212 silent vignettes (cinématons), each 3 minutes and 25 seconds long, of various celebrities, artists, journalists and friends of the director, each doing whatever they want for the allotted time. Subjects of the film include directors Sergey Parajanov, Barbet Schroeder, Nagisa Oshima, Volker Schlöndorff, Ken Loach, Benjamin Cuq, Youssef Chahine, Wim Wenders, Joseph Losey, Jean-Luc Godard, Samuel Fuller and Terry Gilliam, chess grandmaster Joël Lautier, and actors Roberto Benigni, Stéphane Audran, Julie Delpy, Murray Head, Ronee Blakley and Lesley Chatterley. Gilliam is featured eating a 100-franc note, while Fuller smokes a cigar. Courant's favourite subject was a 7-month-old baby. The film was screened in its then-entirety in Avignon in November 2009 and was screened in Redondo Beach in April 2010.

== See also ==
- List of longest films by running time
