= Hôtel de Ville, Épinay-sur-Seine =

Town hall in Épinay-sur-Seine, France

Hôtel de Ville
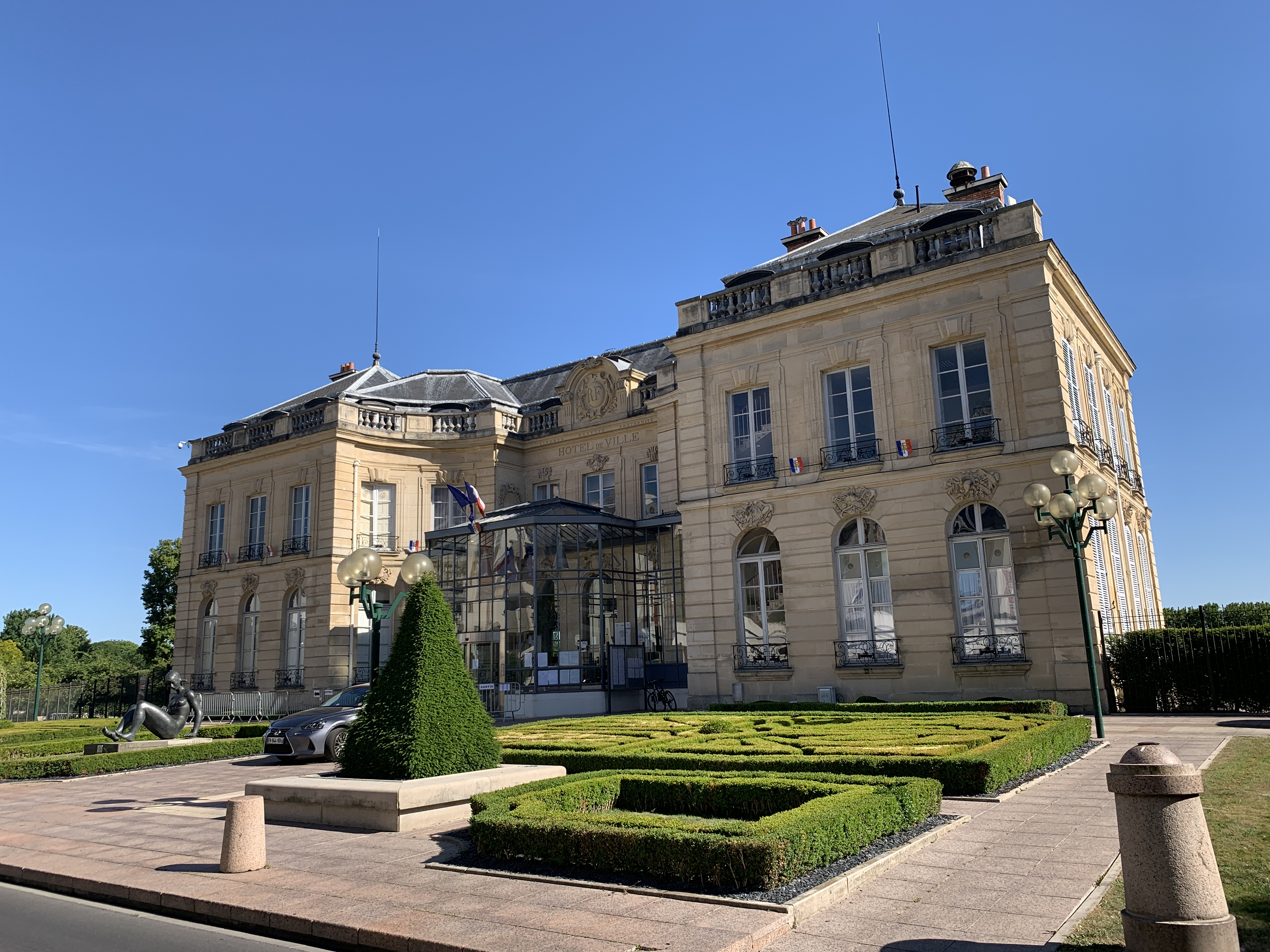
- The main frontage of the Hôtel de Ville in May 2020

General information
- Type: City hall
- Architectural style: Neoclassical style
- Location: Épinay-sur-Seine, France
- Coordinates: 48.9516°N 2.3134°E
- Completed: 1760

Monument historique
- Official name: Hôtel de ville, ancien hôtel seigneurial
- Type: Inscrit
- Designated: 1987
- Reference no.: PA00079933

The Hôtel de Ville (French pronunciation: [otɛl də vil], City Hall) is a municipal building in Épinay-sur-Seine, Seine-Saint-Denis in the northern suburbs of Paris, standing on Rue Quetigny. It was designated a monument historique by the French government in 1987.

== History ==
The site has been occupied by the Château of Épinay-sur-Seine since the early 14th century. Guy IX de Laval granted the land on which to build the first château to Jean I of Montmorency in 1306. By the early 17th century, it was a large building, which was owned by Henri de Montmorency, 3rd Duke of Montmorency, until he sold it to an advisor to the Parlement of Paris, Jacques de Chaulnes, in 1609.

The site was acquired by a French cavalry officer, Joseph Durey de Sauroy, Marquis du Terrail, in the mid-18th century. He commissioned the current château as a maison de plaisance. It was designed in the neoclassical style, built in ashlar stone and was completed in 1760. The design involved a main frontage of 13 bays facing onto what is now Rue Quetigny. The main frontage was formed by a central section of three bays, flanked by curved sections of two bays each, connecting to pavilions of three bays each. The central section featured three round openings with mascarons on the ground floor, and three casement windows with moulded surrounds and mascarons on the first floor. The other bays were fenestrated in a similar style. At roof level, there was an entablature, a cornice and a balustraded parapet and, above the central bay, there was an oval-shaped coat of arms, flanked by pilasters supporting a segmental pediment.

The building changed hands several times in the 19th century. It was occupied by the Italian politician, Giovanni Battista Sommariva from 1804, by the banker, Joseph Périer from 1839, and by the Tunisian politician, Mahmoud Ben Ayed, from 1853. It was then acquired by an English aristocrat, Sir Richard Tufton, 1st Baronet, in 1859. After that it was bought by the former king consort of Spain, Francisco de Asís de Borbón, Duke of Cádiz, in 1881. Francisco commissioned the architect, William Bouwens van der Boijen, to carry out some modifications, including new glass canopies, which were completed in 1889. Francisco's wife, Isabella, and two of his daughters, Isabel and Eulalia, were present, when he died there in 1902.

Meanwhile, the town council had been holding its meetings throughout much of the 19th century in a small two-storey house located near the Church of Saint-Médard on Rue de Paris. However, by the early 20th century, the town council considered that this arrangement was inadequate. In 1906, the mayor, Georges-Marie Thibout, purchased the château in a personal capacity and then sold it on to the town council at a heavily discounted price. It was officially opened for public use by Thibout on 19 July 1908, although the fitting out of the principal rooms, including the Salle du Conseil (council chamber), was not completed until 1911. Nine paintings by Louis Abel-Truchet depicting various local scenes, including one depicting the Franco-Prussian War Memorial at Les Mobiles, were installed in the council chamber in 1914.

During the Paris insurrection, part of the Second World War, members of the French Resistance seized the town hall on 19 August 1944. This was a week before the official liberation of the town by the French 2nd Armoured Division, commanded by General Philippe Leclerc, on 25 August 1944.

The former Salle de Bal (ballroom) was converted for use as the Salle des Mariages (wedding room) and refurbished in 2013.
