= Giovanni Battista Sommariva =

Italian politician

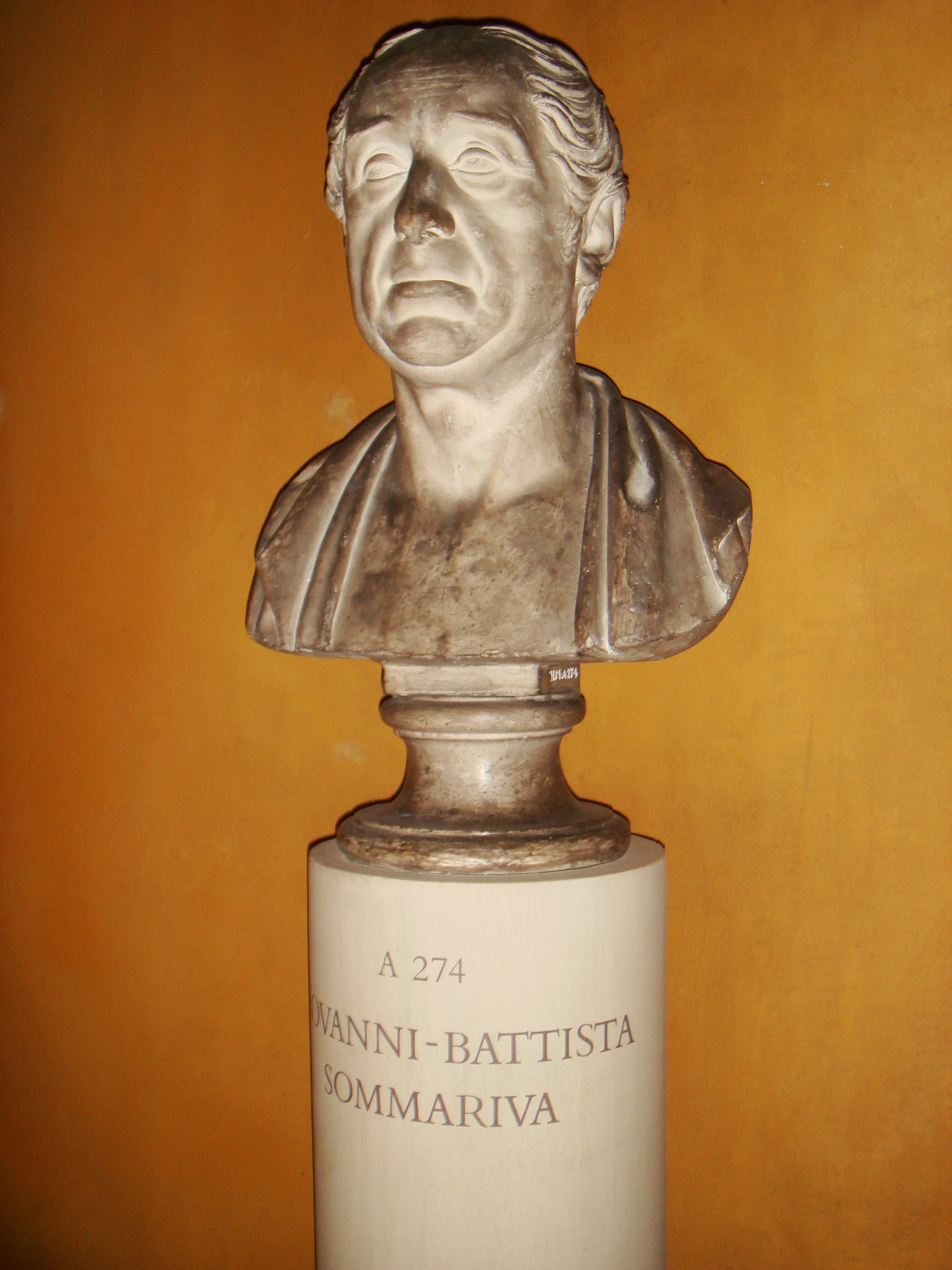
Bust of G.B. Sommariva by Bertel Thorvaldsen, 1817

Giovanni or Gian Battista Sommariva (died 6 January 1826 in Milan) was an Italian politician of the Cisalpine Republic and a notable arts patron.

== Biography ==
Born in 1762 in Sant'Angelo Lodigiano, of a humble family, he eventually became a wealthy barrister. He was living in Milan by 1796 when Napoleon’s army entered the city. Sommariva took the side of the French and he was recruited to become secretary general of the directory of the Cisalpine Republic. In 1799, he fled from Milan to France to escape the armies of Suvorov. He returned to Italy after the Battle of Marengo and was the virtual dictator of Milan from 1800 to 1802, amassing a personal fortune and making many enemies due to his unscrupulous behaviour. When Napoleon replaced him with Francesco Melzi d'Eril, Sommariva turned his attention to building a collection of contemporary art, which he displayed in his villa (now the Villa Carlotta) at Tremezzo on Lake Como.

In 1806 he moved to Paris, bought a town house there, as well as large a country estate at Montmorency, north of the city, and increased his patronage of contemporary artists. He commissioned works from many important French and Italian artists of the early 19th century, including Jacques-Louis David (e.g. Cupid and Psyche, 1817; Cleveland Museum of Art). Sommariva preferred the Neoclassical style and mythological subjects, which often stress the theme of peace and its delights. He was the most important patron in France of Italian sculptors, especially of Antonio Canova, whose Penitent Magdalene (marble, 1794–6; Genoa, Museo di Sant'Agostino) he acquired. He also commissioned engravings and enamels after his paintings for the purpose of advertising his collection and furthering his social ambitions. His liaison with Sophie d'Houdetot placed him within the circle of her influential salon.

Following his death in 1826 his son Luigi Sommariva took part of the Paris collection to the villa on Lake Como, where he continued to add to it. After Luigi’s death in 1838 most of the paintings and sculptures remaining from his father’s collection in Paris, including many copies of Old Master paintings, were auctioned by Luigi’s widow. Three paintings by Pierre-Paul Prud'hon set record prices at auction; another painting, Transported by Zephyrs (1808), was donated to the Louvre.

== Bibliography ==
- Gabriella Tassinari - Incisori in pietre dure e collezionisti a Milano nel primo ottocento: il caso di Antonio Berini e Giovanni Battista Sommariva - Le gemme incise nel settecento e ottocento - Continuità della tradizione classica. (Atti del Convegno di studio, Udine, 26 settembre 1998). Editore L'Erma di Bretschneider 2006
- P.E. Visconti - Notizia delle opera dell'incisore in pietre dure e in coni Cav. Giuseppe Girometti - Roma tipografia Boulzaler 1833 Dedicato alla Eminenza Reverendissima del Sig. cardinale Mario Mattei
- Patrick Kragelund, Bertel Thorvaldsen, Mogens Nykjær Thorvaldsen: l'ambiente, l'influsso, il mito edito da L'Erma di Bretschneider 1991 pag.96
- Haskell, Francis (1972). "More about Sommariva". The Burlington Magazine. 114 (835): 691–695. ISSN 0007-6287. JSTOR 877095.
