= Télé 7 Jours =

French weekly magazine

- Categories: television and celebrity
- Frequency: weekly
- Circulation: 1,225,642 (2014)
- Publisher: Czech Media Invest
- First issue: 29 October 1944; 81 years ago (as "Radio 44")
- Country: France
- Language: French
- Website: www.programme-television.org
- ISSN: 0153-0747

Télé 7 Jours is a French weekly magazine published by Czech Media Invest in France. It publishes news and materials relating to French radio and television programming.

== History and profile ==
Originally, the magazine was named "Radio 44" as it started publishing on 29 October 1944. The name would change ("Radio 45", "Radio 46", etc.) as the year of publication changed, until the year 1957, when it was renamed "Radio Télévision 57" and in 1959 was changed to "Télé 59". Its contents are basically coverage of television news and listings, cultural and lifestyle news and entertainment.

In 1960, Sofirad, the original owner, sold the magazine to Jean Prouvost, who named it "7 jours Télé 60" for a short period and then renamed it to the present "Télé 7 Jours" from 7 March 1960.

The magazine is published on a weekly basis. Its circulation jumped to more than a million copies weekly in 1962 and 2 million by 1965 becoming the biggest circulation weekly in France.

In 1976, Hachette purchased the magazine. The magazine remained the most read French magazine in the 1980s and 1990s reaching a circulation of 3.2 million weekly.

From 1985 to 2003, Télé 7 Jours organized a French television production award (similar in nature to the Emmy Awards) called the 7 d'Or. From 1996 to 1999, Benjamin Cuq worked as reporter for Télé 7 Jours.

In 2007, Télé 7 jours was the fourth best-selling television magazine in France, behind Télé Z, TV Hebdo and TV Magazine. After the disappearance of TV Hebdo, Télé 7 jours is in second place in 2017.

In 2019, Hachette sold Télé 7 Jours and other magazines to Czech Media Invest, parent of Czech News Center.

== Circulation ==
Télé 7 Jours sold 2,800,000 copies in 1974. The circulation of the weekly was 2,606,000 copies in 1999.

It was the sixth best-selling television magazine worldwide with a circulation of 2,371,000 copies in 2001. In 2005 its circulation dropped to 1,892,000 copies, but it was the best-selling magazine in France.

The circulation of the magazine was 1,588,000 copies during the 2007-2008 period. In 2010 the magazine sold of 1,471,593 copies. Its circulation was 1,225,642 copies in 2014.
