= Épinay-sur-Seine =

- Commune
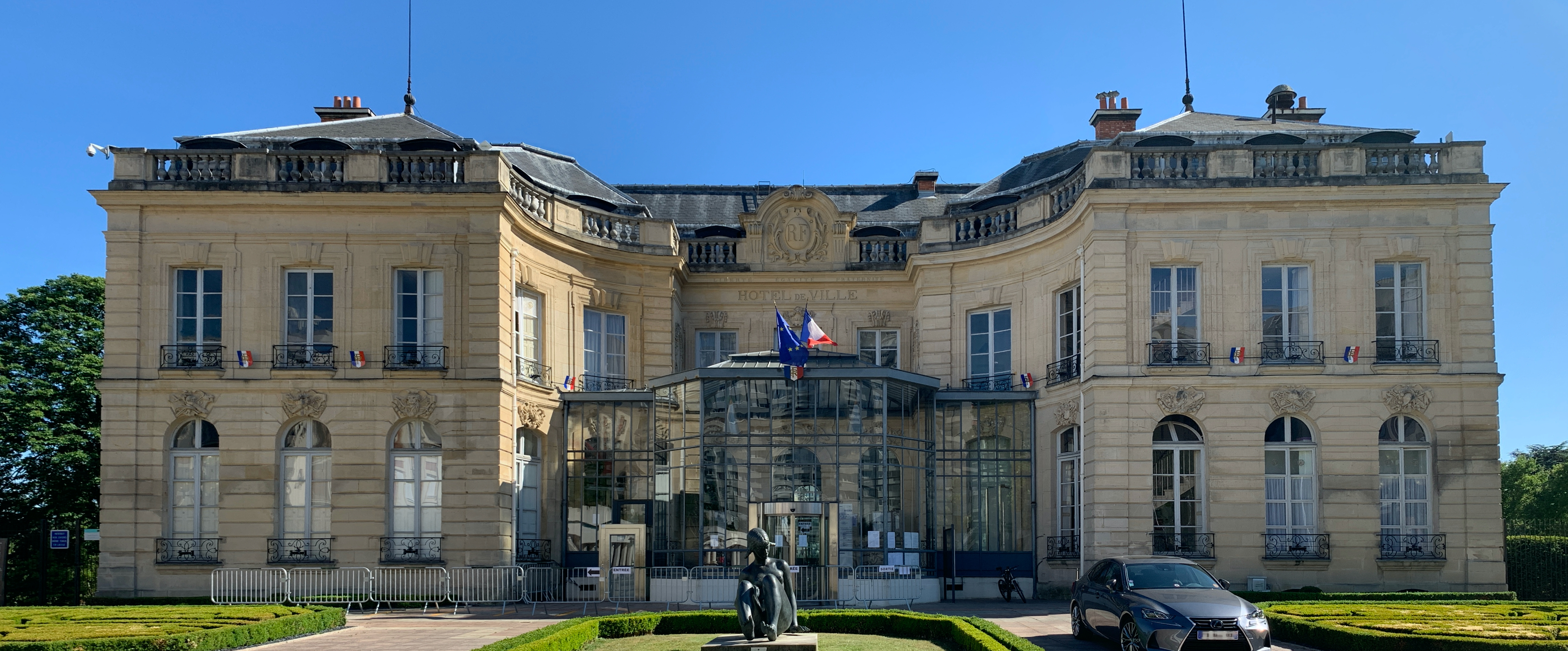
- The Hôtel de Ville

- Coat of arms

- Location (in red) within Paris inner suburbs
- Location of Épinay-sur-Seine
- Location within France Location within Île-de-France (region)
- Coordinates: 48°57′19″N 2°18′33″E
- Country: France
- Region: Île-de-France
- Department: Seine-Saint-Denis
- Arrondissement: Saint-Denis
- Canton: Épinay-sur-Seine and Saint-Ouen-sur-Seine
- Intercommunality: Grand Paris

Government
  - Mayor (2026–32): Hervé Chevreau
- Area^{1}: 4.57 km^{2} (1.76 sq mi)
- Population (2023): 52,833
  - Density: 11,600/km^{2} (29,900/sq mi)
- Demonym: Spinassiens
- Time zone: UTC+01:00 (CET)
  - Summer (DST): UTC+02:00 (CEST)
- INSEE/Postal code: 93031 /93800
- Website: www.epinay-sur-seine.fr
- ^{1} French Land Register data, which excludes lakes, ponds, glaciers > 1 km^{2} (0.386 sq mi or 247 acres) and river estuaries.

Épinay-sur-Seine (French pronunciation: [epinɛ syʁ sɛn]; lit. 'Épinay-on-Seine') is a commune in the Seine-Saint-Denis department, in the northern suburbs of Paris, France. It is located 11.3 km (7.0 mi) from the center of Paris. The church of Notre-Dame-des-Missions-du-cygne d'Enghien, designed by Paul Tournon, may be found in the commune.

== History ==
Epinay sur Seine on Cassini map circa 1750.

The name Épinay derives from its Gallo-Roman name Spinogelum meaning the 'place of thorns and/or gorse'.

The Hôtel de Ville was completed in 1760.

Bernard-Germain-Étienne de La Ville-sur-Illon, comte de Lacépède (1756–1825), naturalist, died in Épinay-sur-Seine.

On 7 August 1850, a part of the territory of Épinay-sur-Seine was detached and merged with a part of the territory of Deuil-la-Barre, a part of the territory of Saint-Gratien, and a part of the territory of Soisy-sous-Montmorency to create the commune of Enghien-les-Bains.

Francis, Duke of Cádiz (13 May 1822 – 17 April 1902), king consort of Spain, took up residence at the château of Épinay-sur-Seine in 1881 until his death in 1902. The chateau now serves as Épinay-sur-Seine's city hall.

From 1902 it was home to the Épinay Studios.

== Population ==
Historical population

Year	Pop.	±% p.a.
1793	851	—
1800	745	−1.88%
1806	805	+1.30%
1821	756	−0.42%
1831	866	+1.37%
1836	1,069	+4.30%
1841	1,119	+0.92%
1846	1,176	+1.00%
1851	1,038	−2.47%
1856	1,238	+3.59%
1861	1,290	+0.83%
1866	1,584	+4.19%
1872	1,526	−0.62%
1876	1,698	+2.71%
1881	2,307	+6.32%
1886	2,362	+0.47%
1891	2,591	+1.87%
1896	2,860	+2.00%
1901	3,438	+3.75%

Year	Pop.	±% p.a.
1906	4,222	+4.19%
1911	5,912	+6.97%
1921	8,912	+4.19%
1926	11,475	+5.19%
1931	14,505	+4.80%
1936	15,889	+1.84%
1946	16,269	+0.24%
1954	17,611	+1.00%
1962	34,167	+8.64%
1968	41,774	+3.41%
1975	46,578	+1.57%
1982	50,314	+1.11%
1990	48,762	−0.39%
1999	46,409	−0.55%
2007	52,020	+1.44%
2012	55,140	+1.17%
2017	55,084	−0.02%
2023	52,833	−0.69%

Source: EHESS and INSEE (1968-2023)

== Town twinning ==
Épinay-sur-Seine is twinned with:

- Oberursel, Germany since 1964
- South Tyneside (before 1974: Jarrow), England since 1965
- Alcobendas, Spain since 1986

== Transport ==
Épinay-sur-Seine is served by Épinay-sur-Seine station on Paris RER line C. It is also served by Épinay–Villetaneuse station on the Transilien Paris-Nord suburban rail line.

Charles de Gaulle Airport is located about 13 km (8.1 mi) away from Épinay-sur-Seine.

== Personalities ==
- Olivier Beaudry, karateka
- Maïtena Biraben, journalist
- Jean-Claude Bouillon, actor
- Elizabeth Colomba, Artist
- Harold Correa, athlete
- Thomas Gamiette, footballer
- Hornet La Frappe, Rapper
- Élisabeth Lévy, journalist
- Pascal Nouma, footballer
- Skalpovich, producer and songwriter

== Heraldry ==
Arms of Épinay-sur-Seine	The arms of Épinay-sur-Seine are blazoned: Per fess: 1: Or, a cross gules between 16 alerions, 2: a pinetree eradicated vert between 2 mullets of six points gules.

== See also ==
- Communes of the Seine-Saint-Denis department
