= Saint-Ouen station (Paris Metro) =

Metro station in Paris

Saint-Ouen
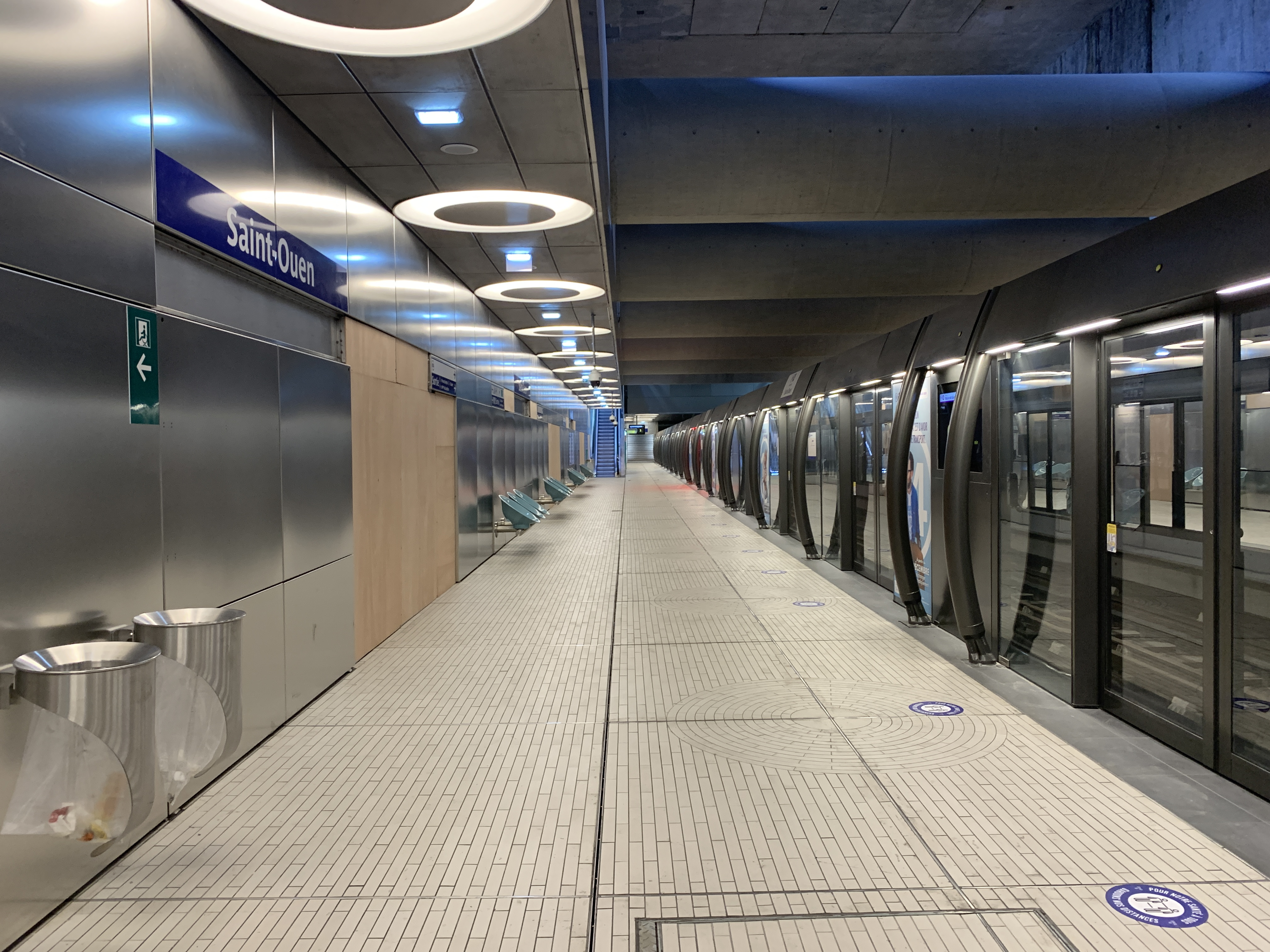
- Platform view the day after opening

General information
- Location: Saint-Ouen; Île-de-France; France
- Coordinates: 48°54′16″N 2°19′19″E
- Owner: RATP
- Operator: RATP
- Line: Paris Metro Paris Metro Line 14
- Platforms: 2 (2 side platforms)
- Tracks: 2

Construction
- Depth: 18.3 m (60 ft)
- Accessible: Yes
- Architect: AZC Architectes + ARCHITRAM

Other information
- Station code: GA62 / 62STO
- Fare zone: 2

History
- Opened: 14 December 2020

Passengers
- 3,420,852 (2021)

Services
Preceding station	Paris Metro	Following station
Mairie de Saint-Ouen towards Saint-Denis–Pleyel	Line 14	Porte de Clichy towards Aéroport d'Orly
Location
- Location within Paris

Saint-Ouen station (French pronunciation: [sɛ̃t‿wɛ̃]) is a station on the Paris Metro, serving Line 14 and offering a transfer to the RER C via Saint-Ouen RER station. It is located at the limits of the territories of the communes of Saint-Ouen-sur-Seine and Clichy. It is the 304th station of the Metro.

== History ==
The station opened on 14 December 2020 as part of the extension of the line from Saint-Lazare to Mairie de Saint-Ouen.

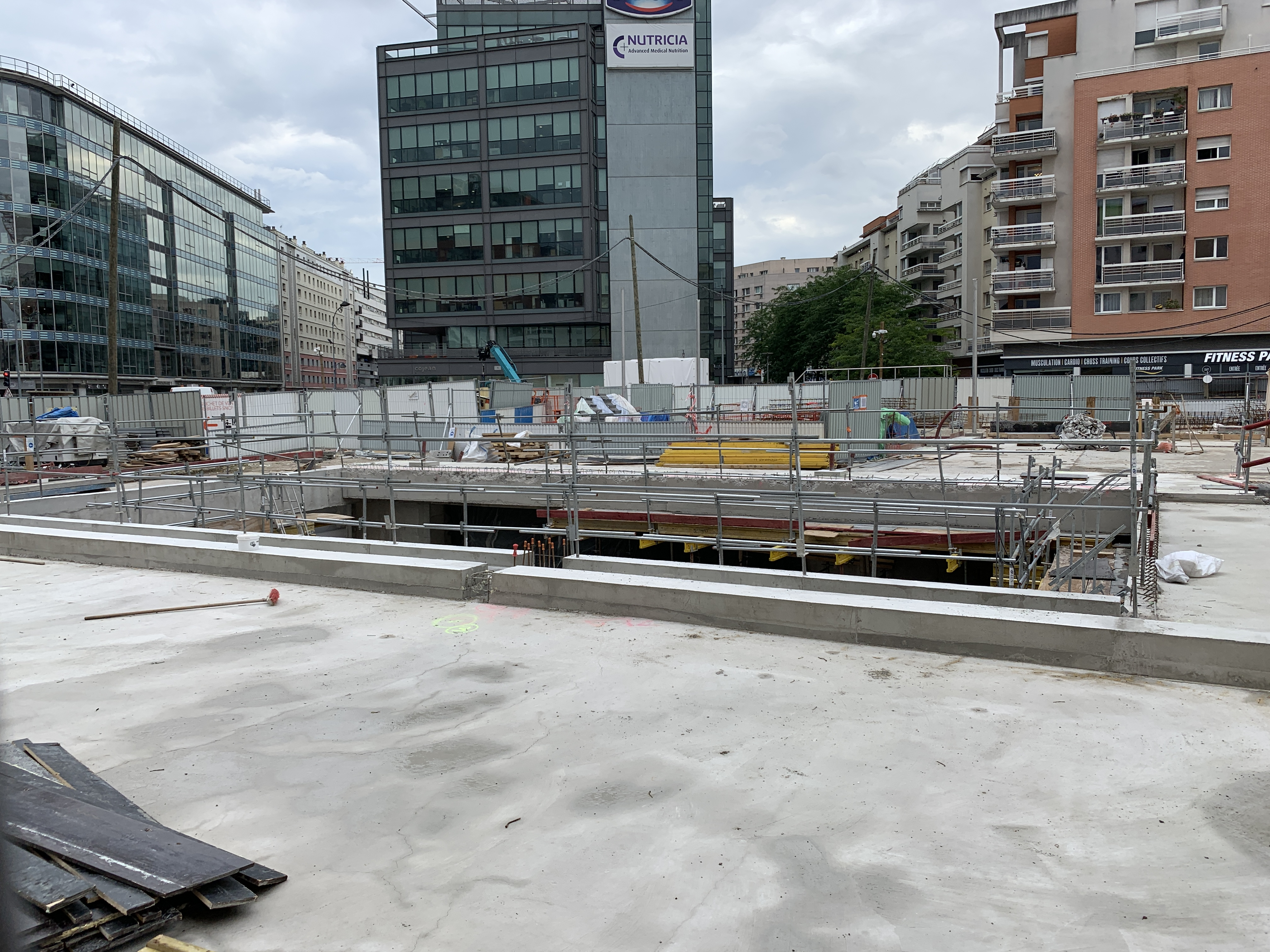
Construction of the station

Initially, the station was planned to be named Clichy-Saint-Ouen as its location straddles the communes of Clichy and Saint-Ouen-sur-Seine. However, it was eventually named Saint-Ouen, taking the name of the existing RER C station, sparking criticism from the municipal council of the commune of Clichy. This was due to a rule from the Île-de-France Mobilités that required two connecting stations to have the same name as well as to take on the name of the station of the more significant mode of transport (ie. train, metro and tramway).

The declaration of public utility was made for the extension of the line to Mairie de Saint-Ouen on 4 October 2012, with work expected to begin in end-2013.

On 17 October 2014, the contract for the construction of the station was awarded to Spie Batignolles TPCI for 60 million euros, with structural work beginning in April 2015 till the spring of 2017. Ground freezing was employed during the construction of the station's connecting passage to the RER station due to the loose waterlogged soil "sable de Beauchamp" under the RER tracks.

Initially expected to open in end 2019, it was postponed to the summer of 2020 due to numerous construction delays, ultimately opening at the end of 2020.

In 2020, the station was used by 75 809 passengers amidst the COVID-19 pandemic, making it the 304th busiest of the Metro network out of 304 stations.

In 2021, the station was used by 3 420 852 passengers, making it the 84th busiest of the Metro network out of 304 stations.

== Passenger services ==
=== Access ===
The station has 7 accesses, with accesses 6 and 7 via the RER C platforms.

- Access 1: rue Dora Maar
- Access 2: Boulevard Victor Hugo
- Access 3: rue Pierre Dreyfus
- Access 4: rue Mme de Sanzillon
- Access 5: rue Touzet
- Access 6: rue Emmy Noether
- Access 7: rue Arago

=== Station layout ===
Street Level
B1	Mezzanine
Platform level	Side platform with PSDs, doors will open on the right
Platform level	Northbound	← toward Saint-Denis–Pleyel (Mairie de Saint-Ouen)
Platform level	Southbound	toward Aéroport d'Orly (Porte de Clichy) →
Platform level	Side platform with PSDs, doors will open on the right

=== Platforms ===
The station has a standard configuration with 2 tracks surrounded by 2 side platforms, with platform screen doors installed on both platforms. It is 160 m long. The platform walls are covered with flat white tiles, decorated with concentric circles and a chrome metal bodywork.The walls are supported midway up by cylindrical transverse beams. The ceiling, in a raw concrete finish, is lit by blue spotlights.

=== Other connections ===
The station is also served by RER C via Saint-Ouen RER station as well as lines 66, 138, 173, 174, 274, and 341 of the RATP bus network.

== Nearby ==
- Parc François-Mitterrand

== Gallery ==
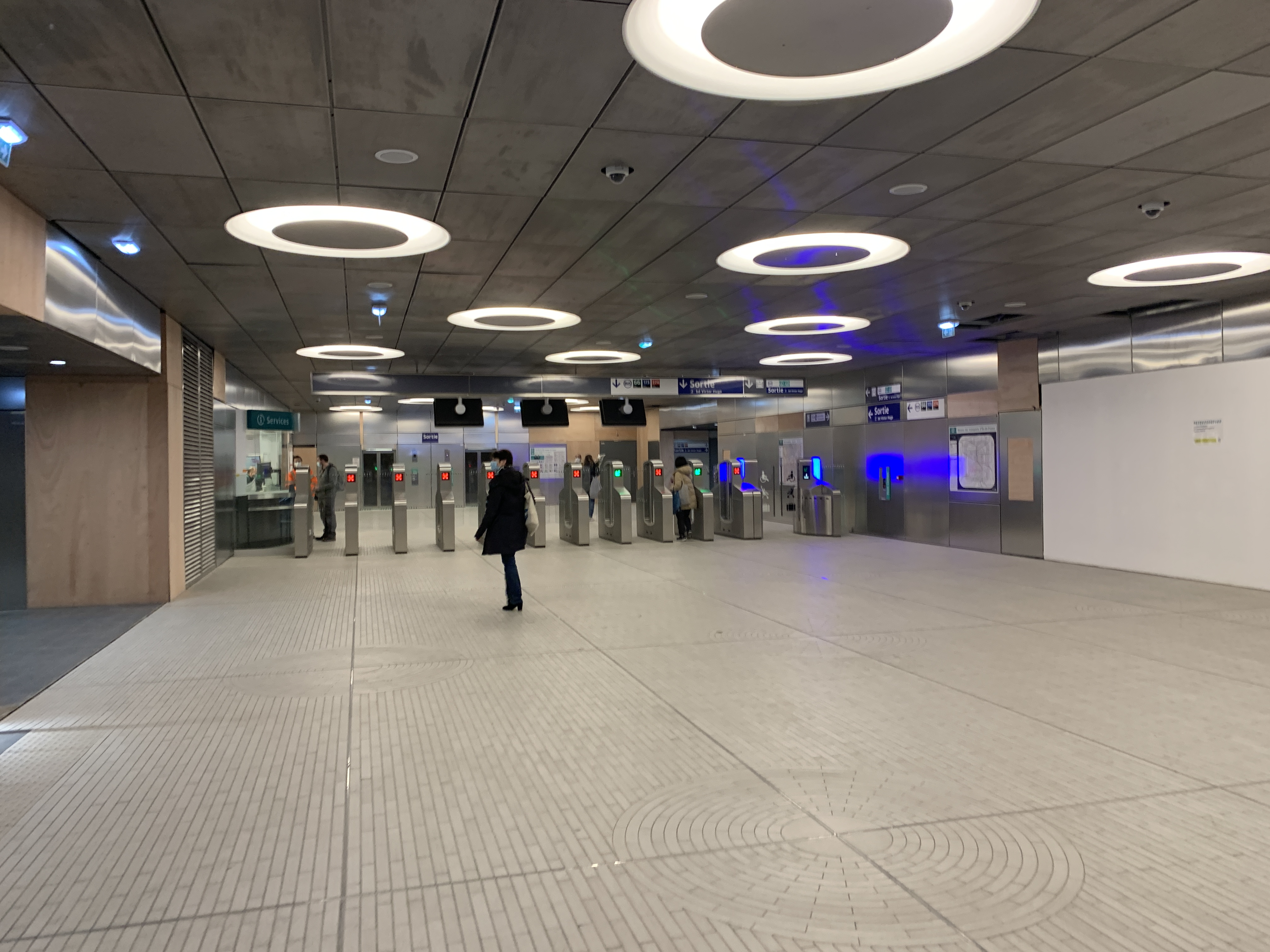
Ticket barriers at the mezzanine

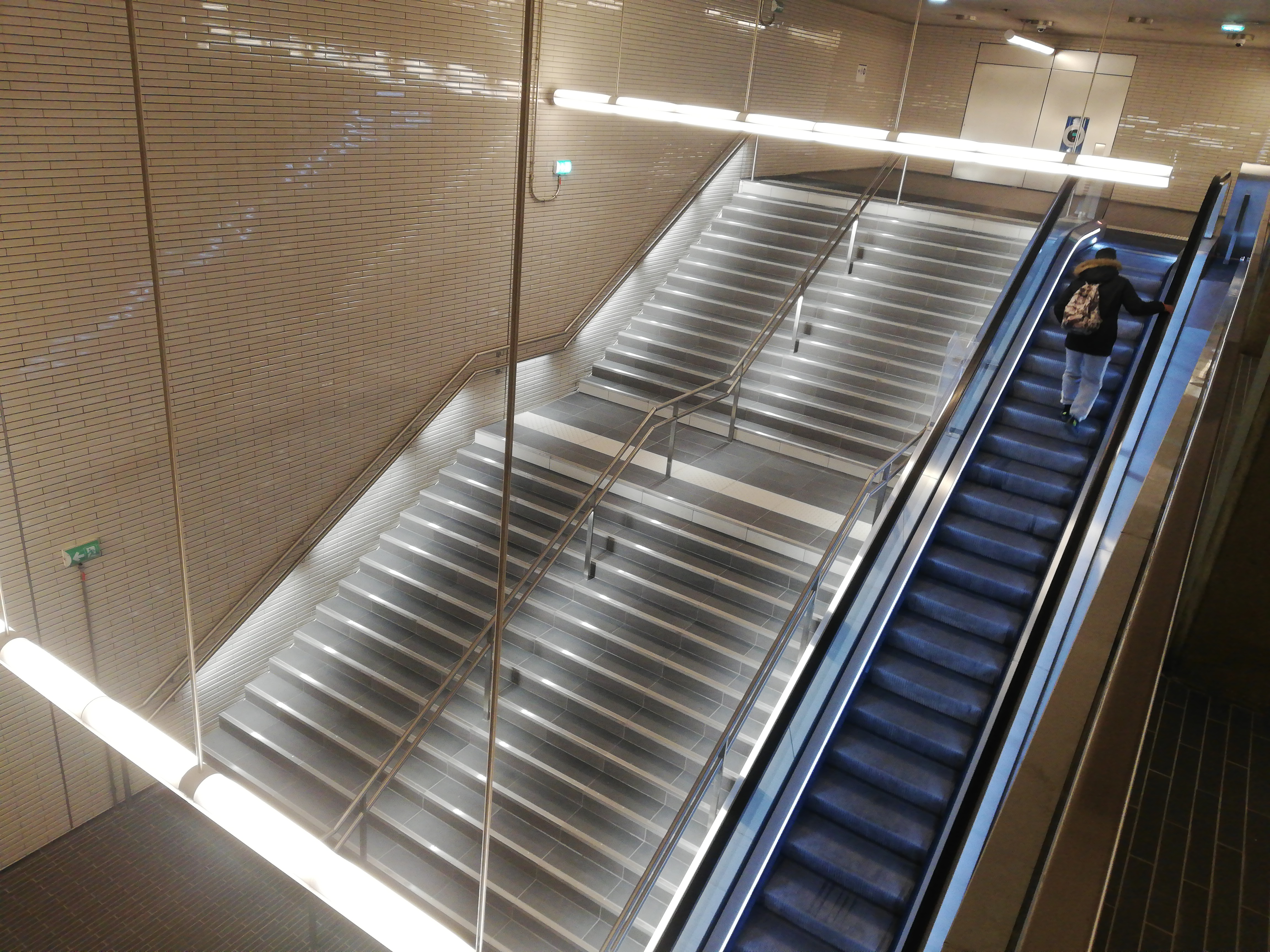
Connecting passage to RER C

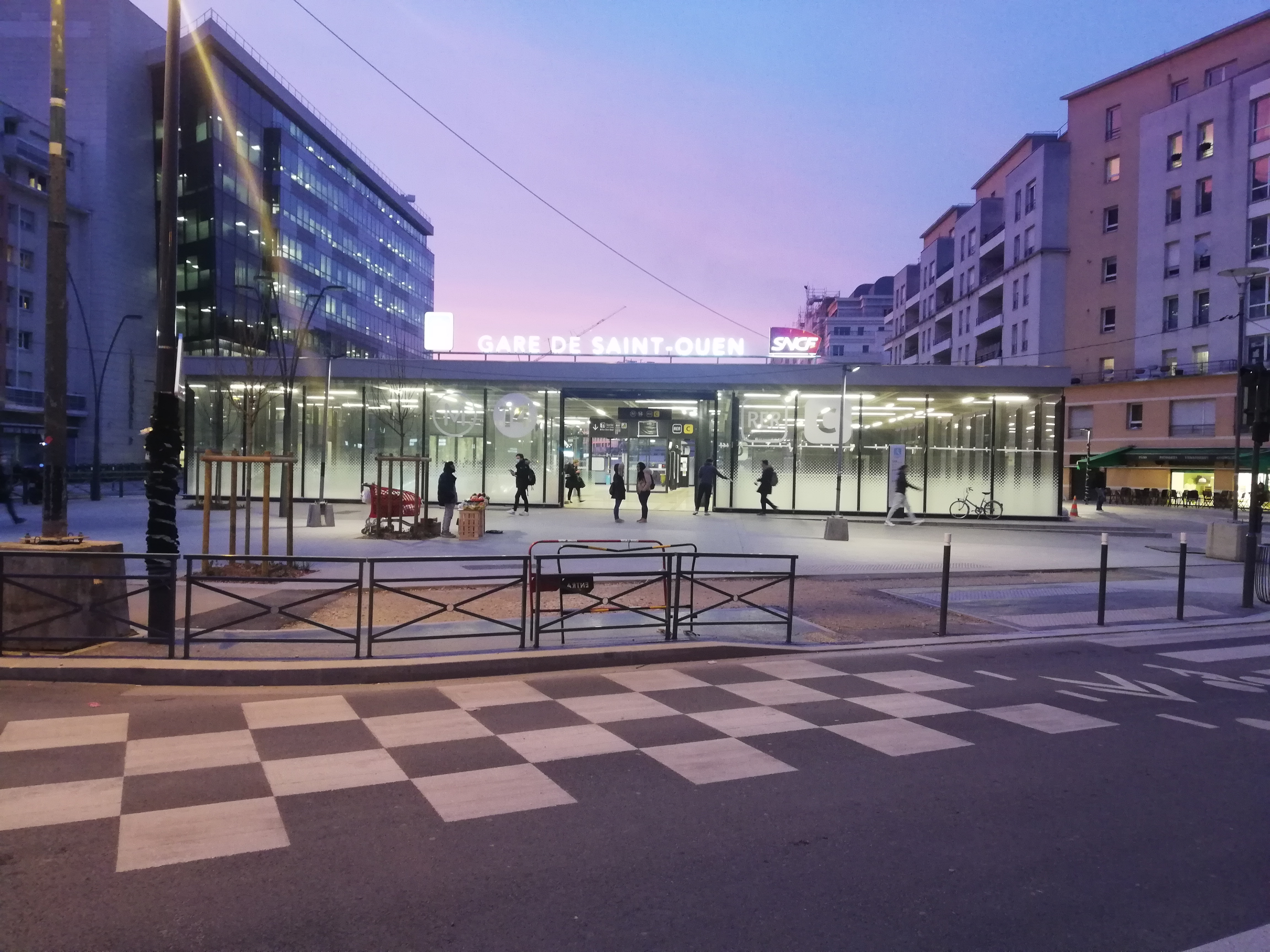
Access 1

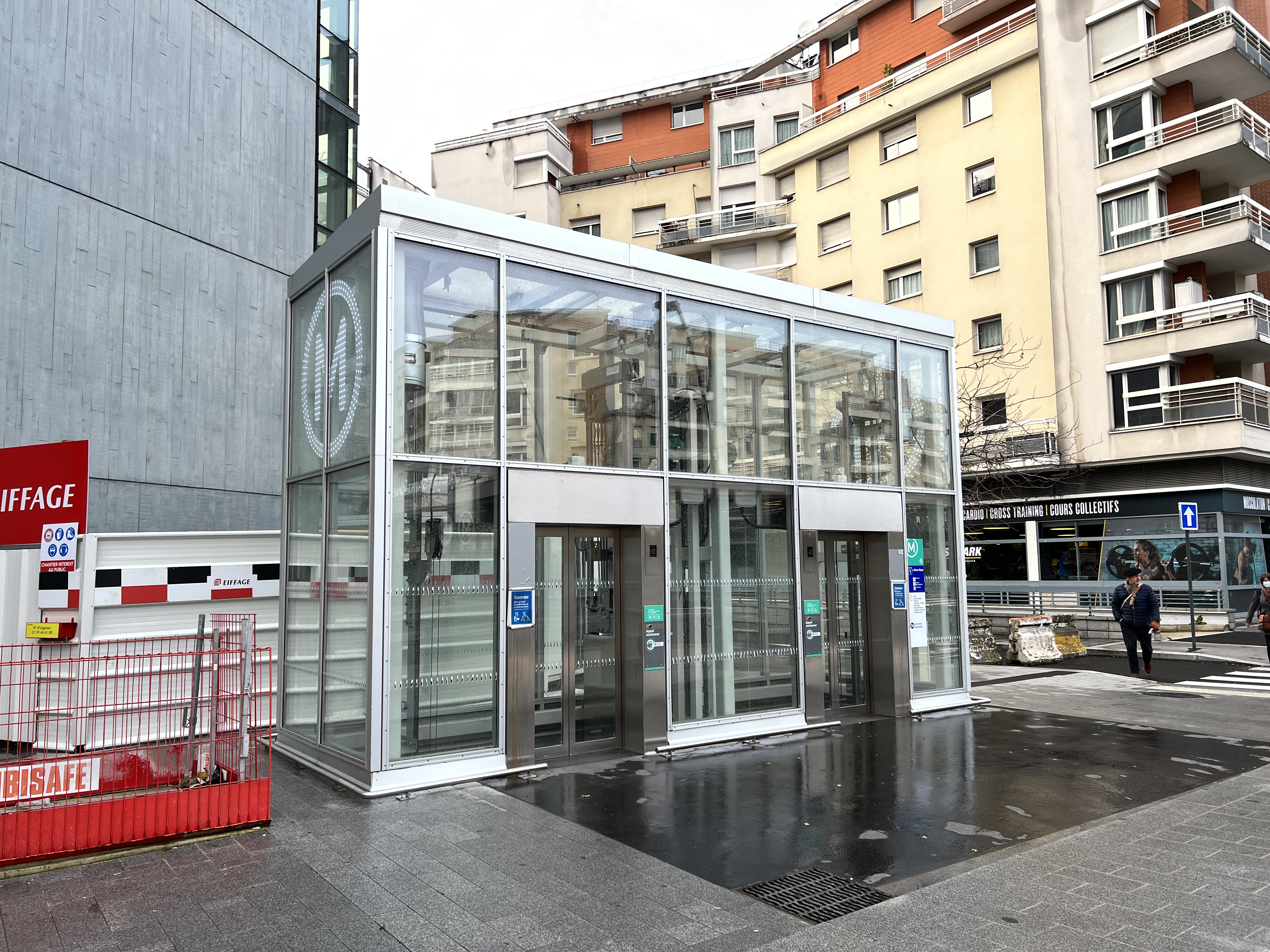
Access 2

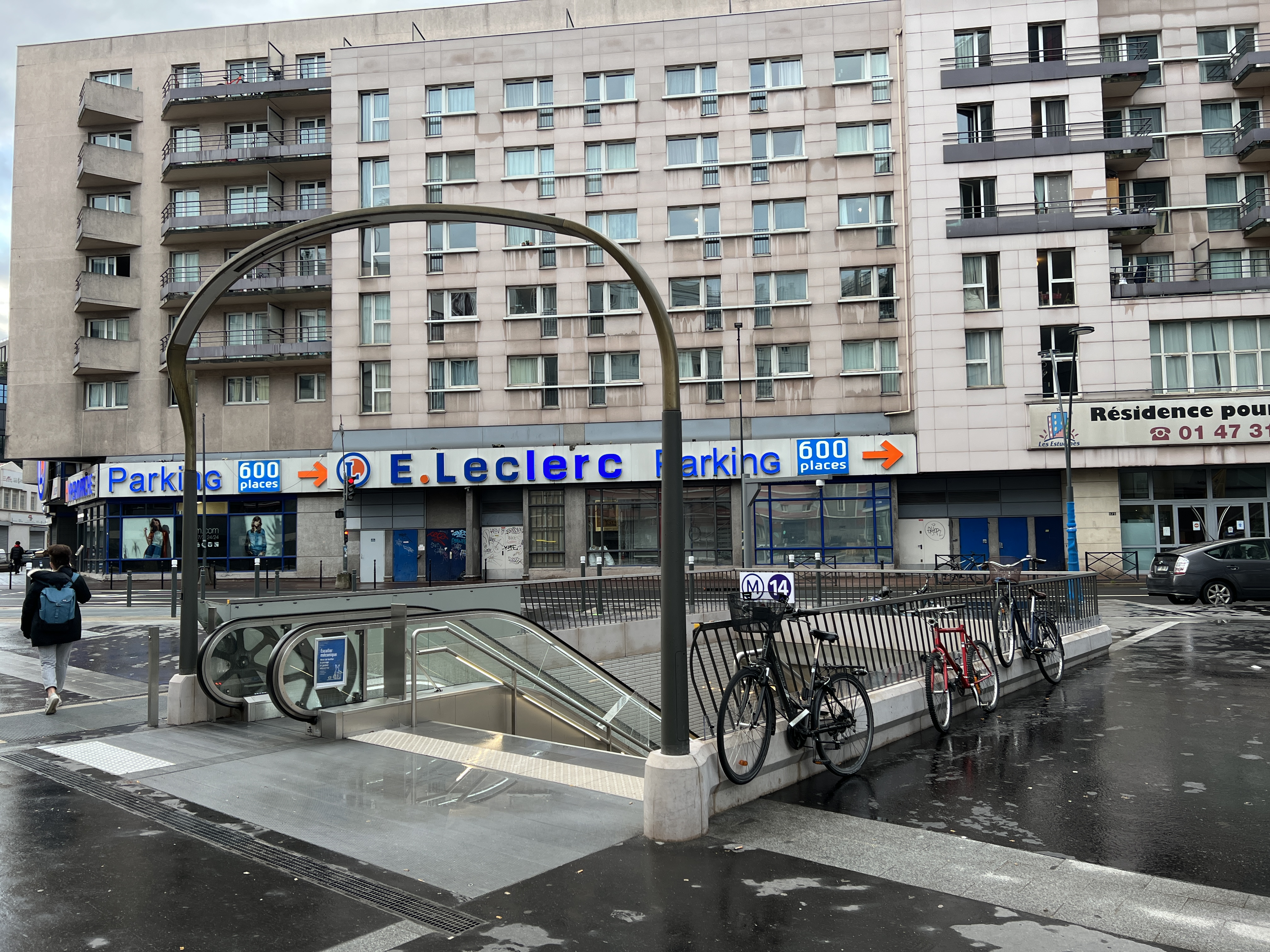
Access 3

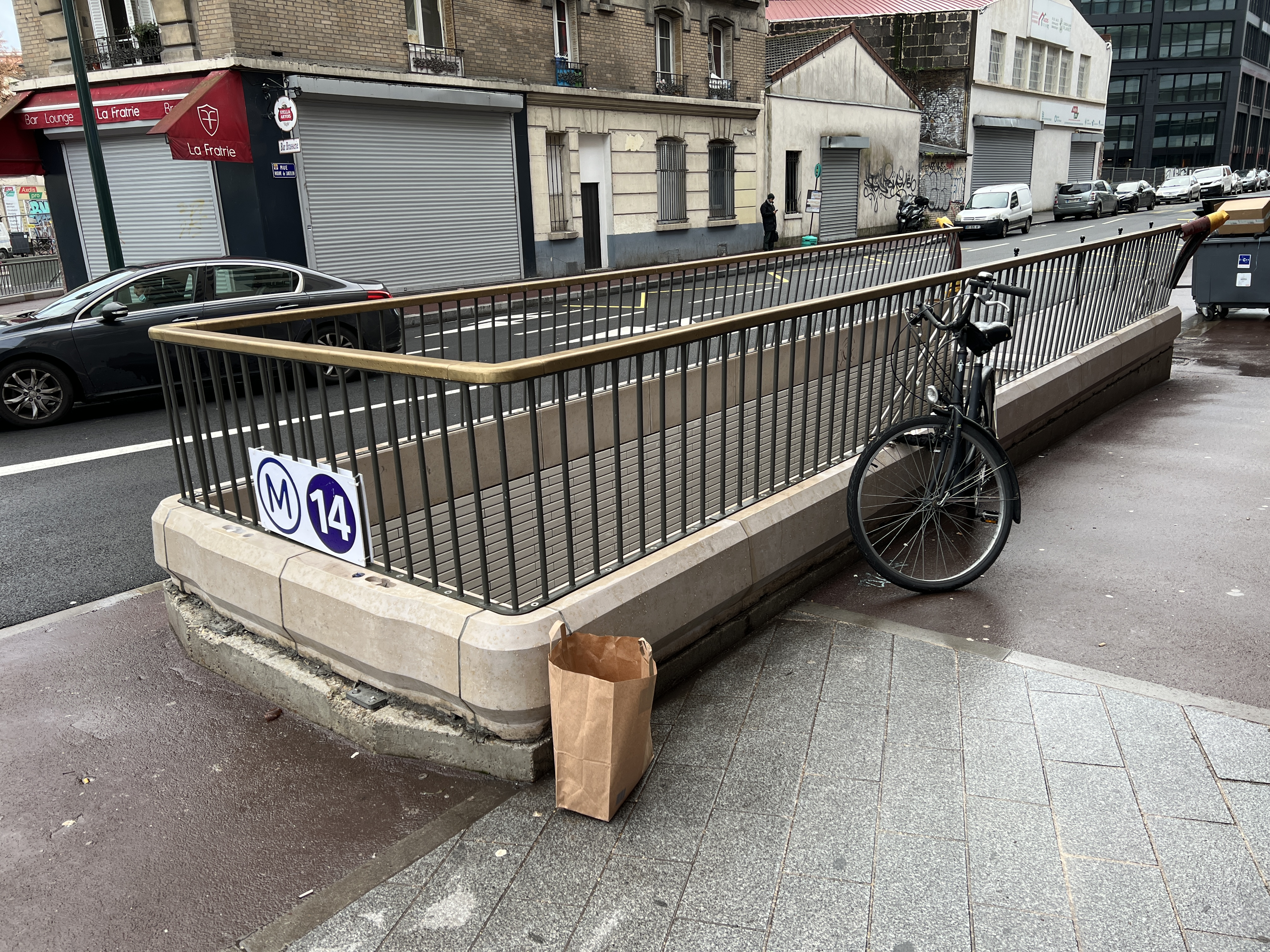
Access 4

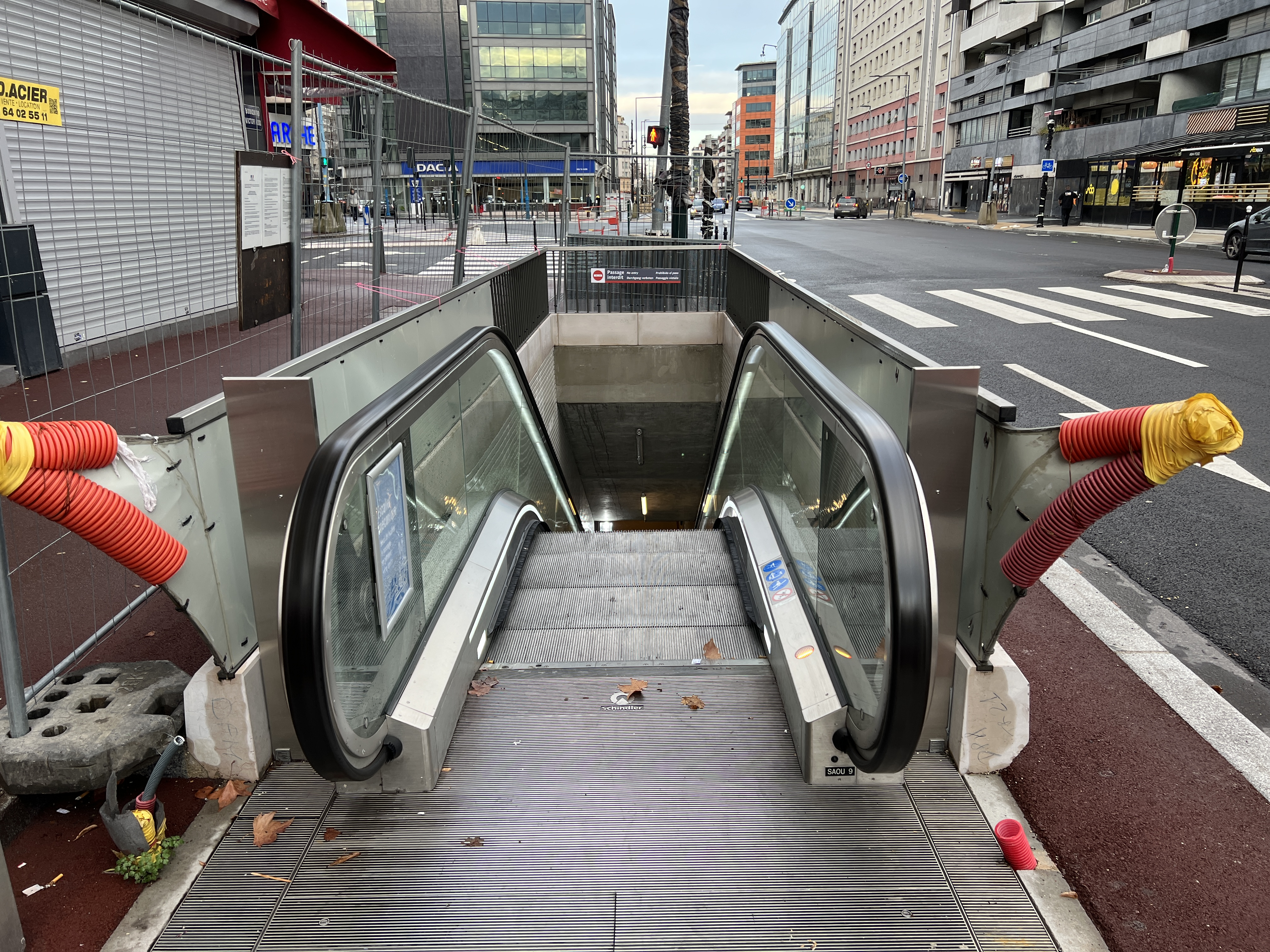
Access 5

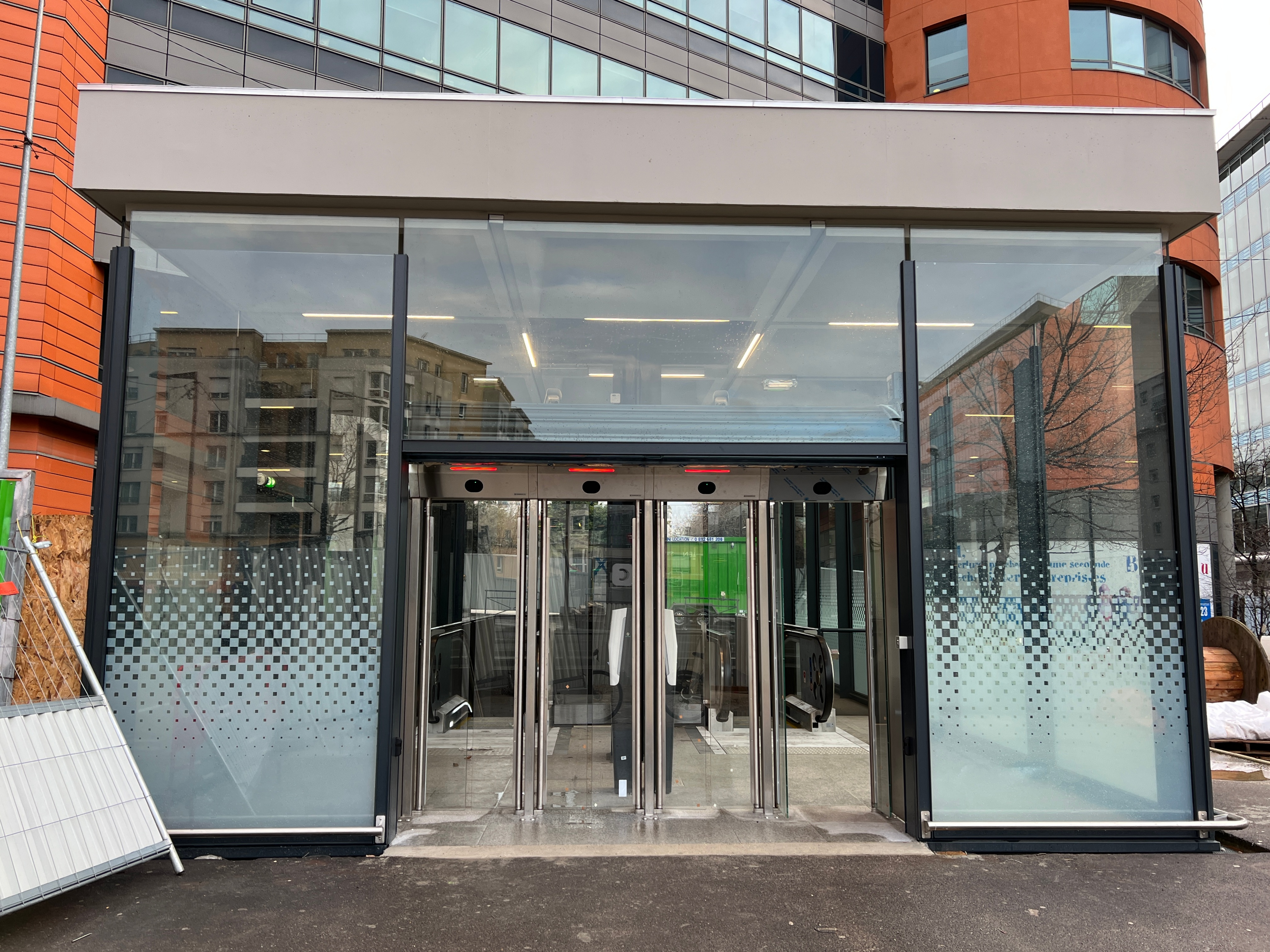
Access 6

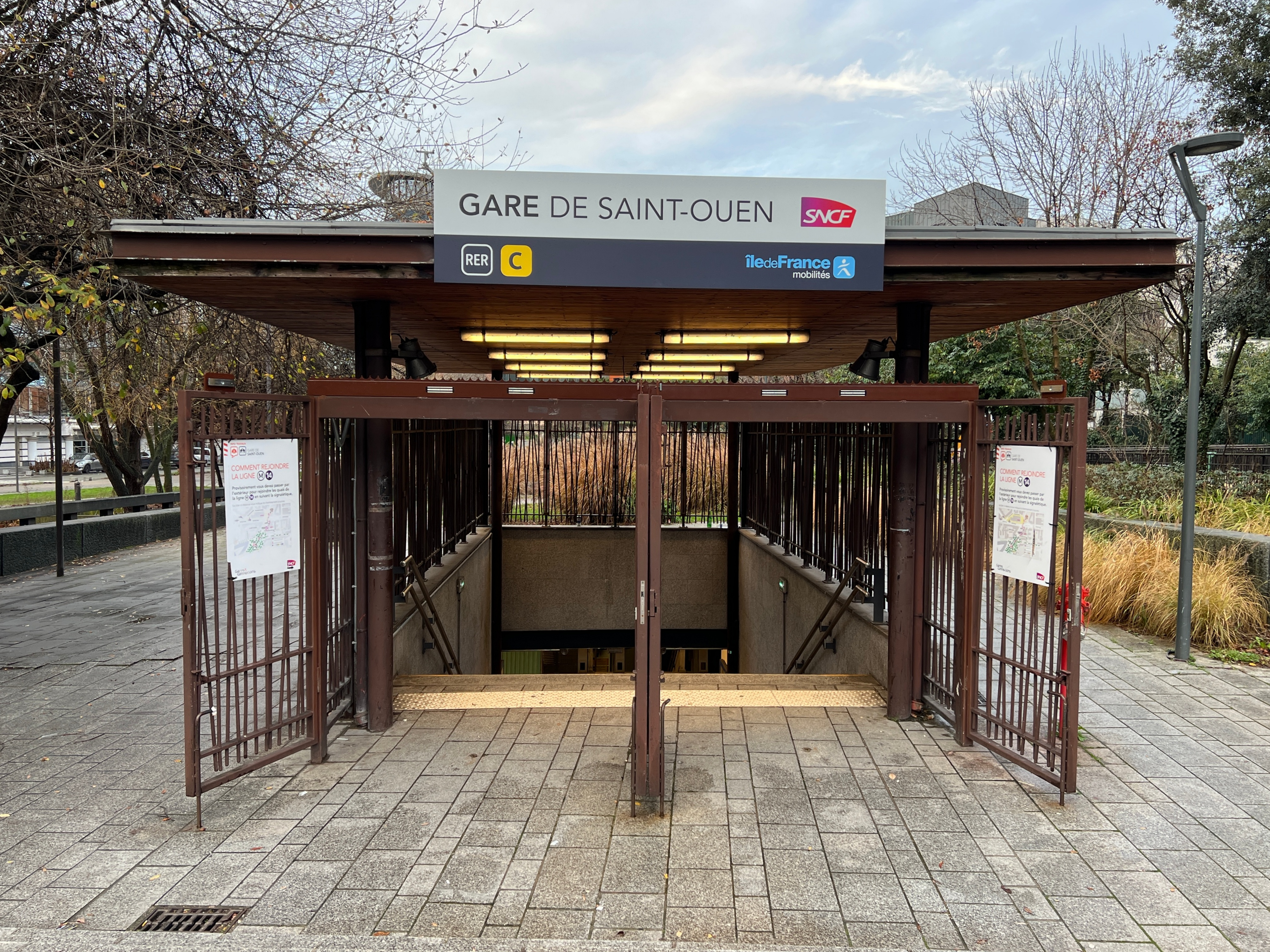
Access 7
