= Church of Saint-Ouen-le-Vieux =

Roman Catholic church in Saint-Ouen-sur-Seine, Seine-Saint-Denis, France

- French: Église Saint-Ouen-le-Vieux
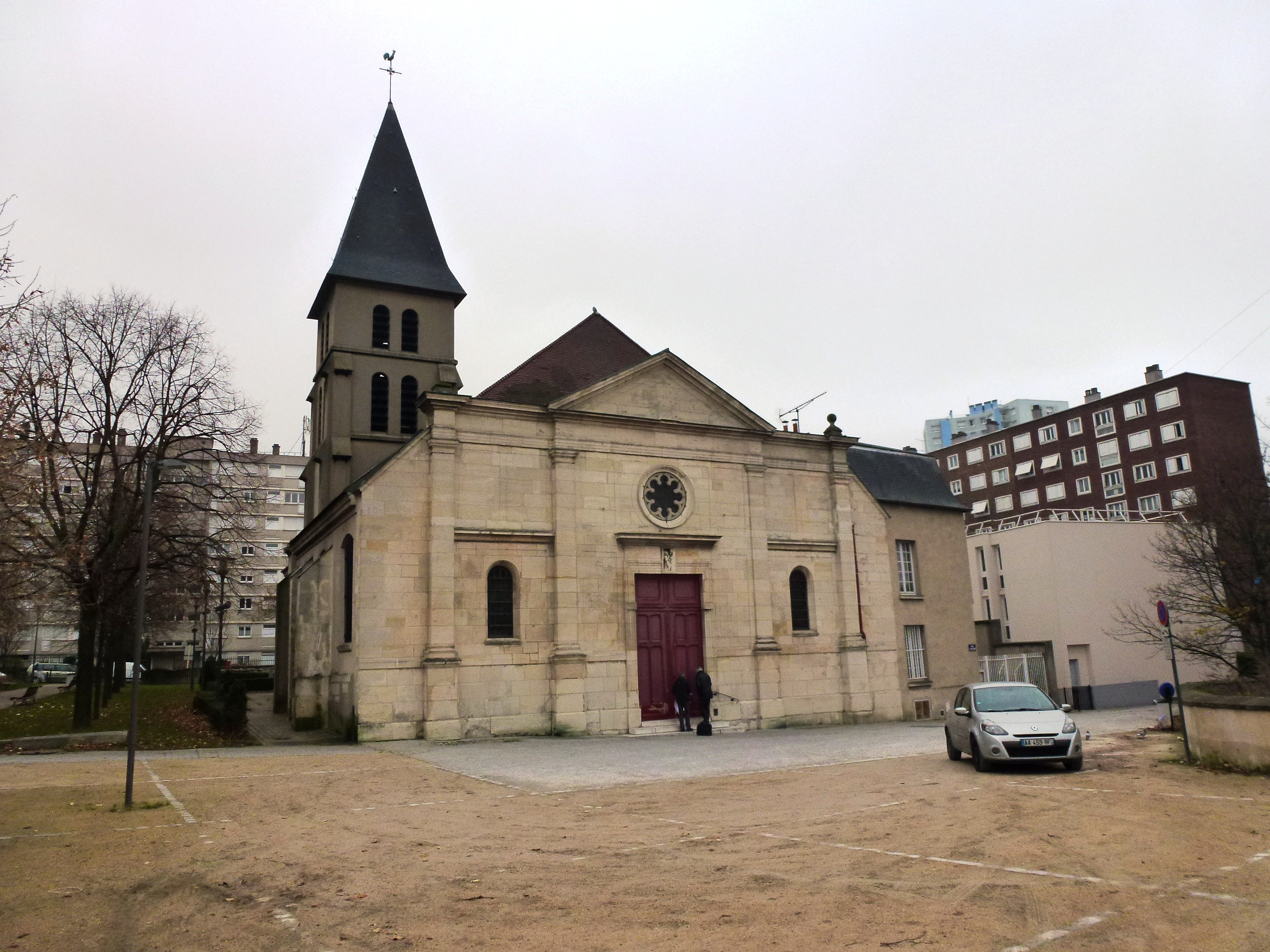

- Location within Paris and the inner ring
- 48°55′08″N 2°19′54″E
- Location: Saint-Ouen-sur-Seine, Seine-Saint-Denis
- Country: France
- Denomination: Roman Catholic

History
- Status: Church
- Dedication: St. Ouen (Audoin)

Architecture
- Functional status: Active
- Architectural type: Church
- Groundbreaking: Middle Ages

Administration
- Diocese: Saint-Denis

Monument historique
- Official name: PA00079961
- Criteria: Inscrit MH
- Designated: June 6, 1933
- Reference no.: PA00079961

The Church of Saint-Ouen-le-Vieux (French: église Saint-Ouen-le-Vieux) or the Church of Vieux-Saint-Ouen (église du Vieux-Saint-Ouen) is a Roman Catholic church dedicated to St. Ouen and located in Saint-Ouen-sur-Seine in the department of Seine-Saint-Denis, France. It was listed as a Historic Monument in 1933.

The church was built near the site of the former villa Clippiacum belonged to King Dagobert I and that was the Meorvingian birthplace of the city. It is located on Rue du Planty, named after the 19th-century mayor of the city who restored the church. The building stands on a small hill on which a few vines are planted.

== History ==
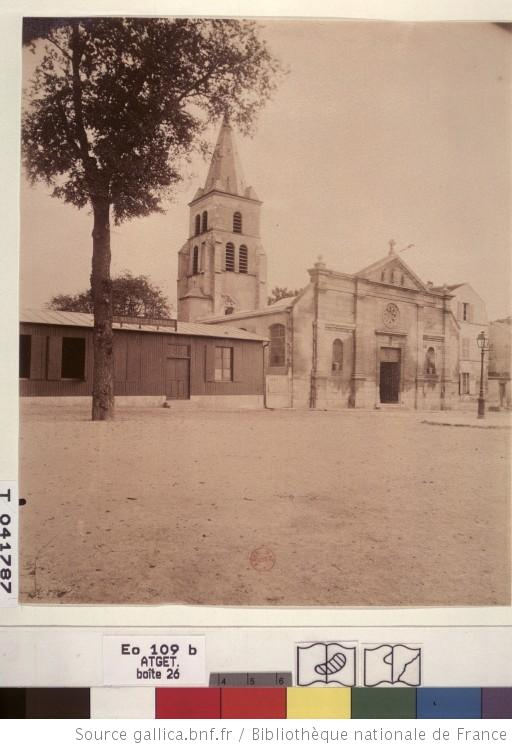
1901 photograph by Eugène Atget.

St. Ouen died on that place in 686. Hilduin of Saint-Denis reported that a chapel was located there in 832. The chapel was built on the bank of the Seine and kept its relics; thus it became a pilgrimage site. In the 12th century, a Romanesque chapel was built on the same site. The choir and the capitals were sculpted with acanthus leaves between the 1140s and the 1160s. The keystone from the House of Condé was added in the 16th century, while the façade was ended during the reign of Henry IV. The portal was destroyed during the Wars of Religion and re-built in the 17th century.

The 18th-century organ was vandalised in 2006. In 1976, the mayor Paulette Fost undertook restoration works performed by architects Brasilier, Thyrault and Plankaert.

== Former cemetery ==
The parish cemetery has been located near the church since 1293. On the 1811 cadastral map, the cemetery covered an area of around 700 square meters, north of the church. In 1849, the bones were transferred to a place known as La Maison Blanche, now Place de la Mairie. In 1867, they were transferred to La Motte.
