= Audoin (bishop) =

Frankish bishop, courtier, chronicler, and Christian saint

Saint Audoin
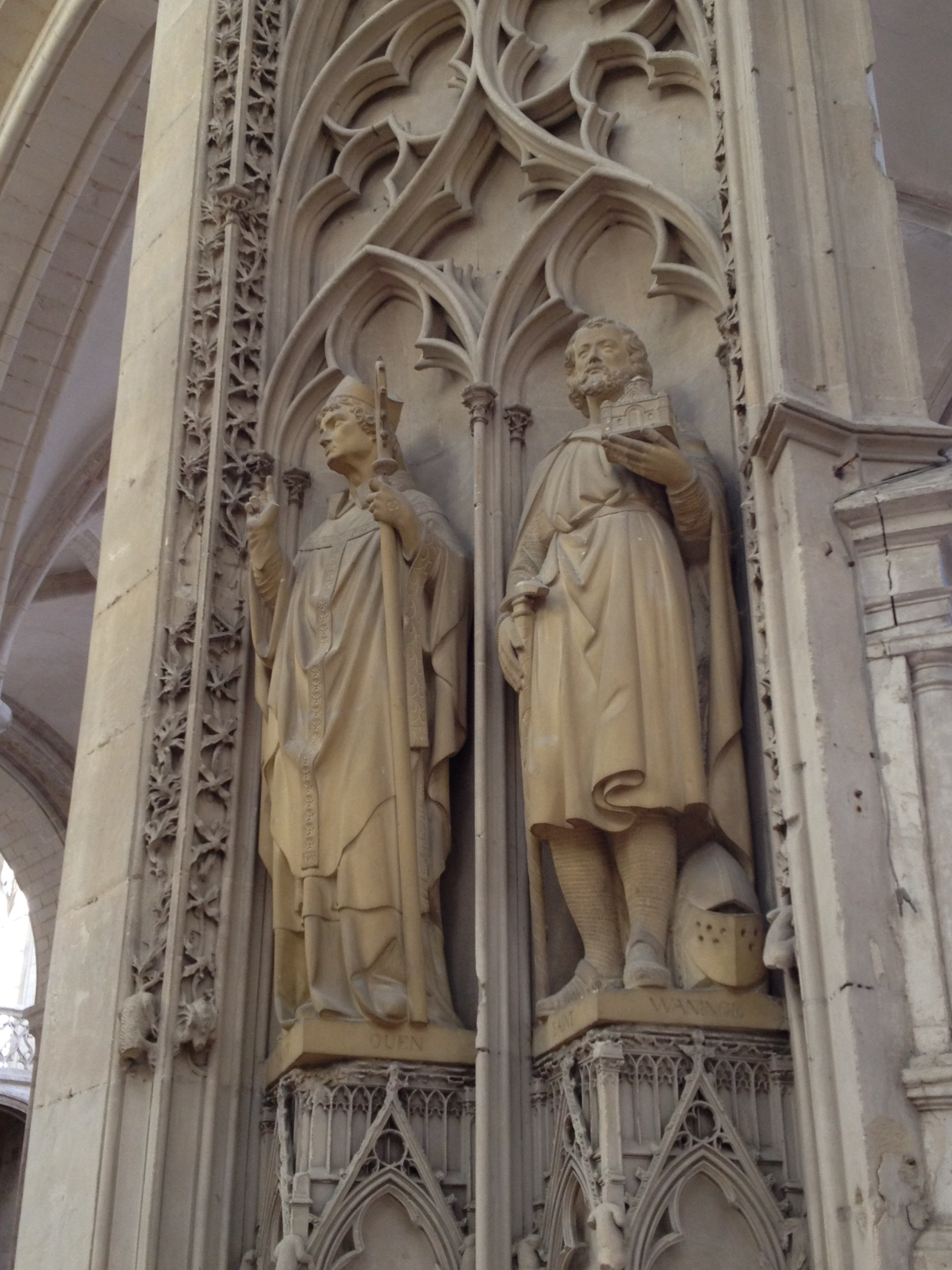
- Statue of St Audoin (left) and St Waninge (right), in Fécamp, France.
- Born: 609; Sancy, Kingdom of the Franks
- Died: 24 August 684; Clichy
- Venerated in: Eastern Orthodox Church; Catholic Church; Anglican Communion
- Canonized: pre-congregation
- Feast: 24 August
- Patronage: deaf people; invoked against deafness

Audoin (Note: Also spelled Audoen, Ouen and Owen and known as Dado to contemporaries.) (Latin: Audoenus; AD 609 – on 24 August 684), venerated as Saint Audoin, was a Frankish bishop, courtier, hagiographer and saint. He authored Vita Sancti Eligii which outlines the life and deeds of Eligius, his close friend and companion in the royal court and the Church.

== Life ==
Audoin came from a wealthy aristocratic Frankish family who held lands in the upper Seine and Oise valleys. His father was Authaire (Audecharius). Audoin was a first cousin of Agilbert, bishop of the West Saxons. He spent his childhood at Ussy-sur-Marne, and was then sent to be educated at the Abbey of Saint-Médard de Soissons. From there he went to the court of Chlothar II (d.629), where training both military and literary was given to young noblemen, he served Dagobert I as one of his referendaries (administrators). "Clothar's household seems to have been of particular importance in determining who was to be of political importance for the next two reigns."

=== Court official ===
He was part of a group of young courtiers like Wandrille and Didier of Cahors and was a close friend of Eligius, whose vita he wrote. He and Eligius served as royal envoys to persuade Amadus to baptize Dagobert's son. According to Ian Wood, "Audoin and Eligius were arguably the most influential churchmen in Francia during the seventh century."

In 634 Audoin was ordained priest by Dieudonné, Bishop of Mâcon. The following year, he and his brothers Ado and Rado founded Rebais Abbey, on land donated by King Dagobert. Audoin appointed his relative, Agilus, as first abbot. He also took part in the founding of Saint-Wandrille monastery in Rouen, and a nunnery at Fécamp. Fredegar reports that even as court referendary, Audoin had a reputation of being a religious man. According to Wilhelm Levison in his Vita Audoini episcopi Rotomagensis, Audoin spent a year in evangelical exile as a missionary in Spain just prior to becoming bishop.

=== Bishop ===
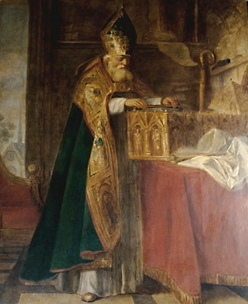
Saint Ouen reliques de saint Eloi

In 641 he succeeded Romanus as bishop of Rouen. Through his influence, Erchinoald donated to Wandregisel the land for Fontenelle Abbey in Normandy. He developed theological studies and participated in the fusion of the rule of Saint Colomban and that of Saint Benedict.

During the regency of Queen Bathilde, Audoin became one of the first counsellors of the queen. He was an advisor of Theuderic III and upheld the policy of Ebroin, the mayor of the palace, to such a degree that he was involved in the mistreatment of Leodegar. The bishop's position was strengthened when Theuderic confirmed to him the right to elect and approve the Count of Rouen.

Around 675 Audoin made a pilgrimage to Rome. There he visited the sanctuaries, distributed alms to the poor of Rome, and collected relics to bring back to Rouen. After Ebroin's death in 681, he went to Cologne and succeeded in restoring peace between Neustria and Austrasia, but died shortly thereafter at the royal villa at Clichy on 24 August 684. He was buried in the Church of Sant-Peter which he himself had built. The former abbot of Fontenelle, Ansbert, succeeded Audoin as Bishop and had his predecessor reburied behind the high altar, the equivalent of a canonization.

Audoin wrote a vita of his friend, Eligius. This biography, which is one of the most authentic historical monuments of the seventh century, contains a store of valuable information regarding the moral and religious education of that time, and also testifies to the life of Aurea of Paris.

A poem on Audoin's life was written in the tenth century by Frithegod, but it is now lost. The author of the Liber Historiae Francorum, thoroughly hostile to the memory of Ebroin, invariably referred to Audoin as "blessed" or "sainted", and in describing his death said he "migravit ad Dominum", a phrase he otherwise reserved in the original part of his history for the death of the "glorious lord of good memory, Childebert III, the just king".

== See also ==
- Church of Saint-Ouen-le-Vieux
- Church of Saint Ouen, Jersey
- Church of Saint Audoen, London
- Church of saint Audoen, Rosnoen (catholic, France)
- St. Audoen's Church, Dublin (Church of Ireland)
- St. Audoen's Church, Dublin (Roman Catholic)

== Sources ==
- Alban Butler's Lives of the Saints, edited, revised and supplemented by Thurston and Attwater. Christian classics, Westminster, Maryland.
