= Porte de Clichy station =

Paris Metro station

Porte de Clichy Tribunal de Paris
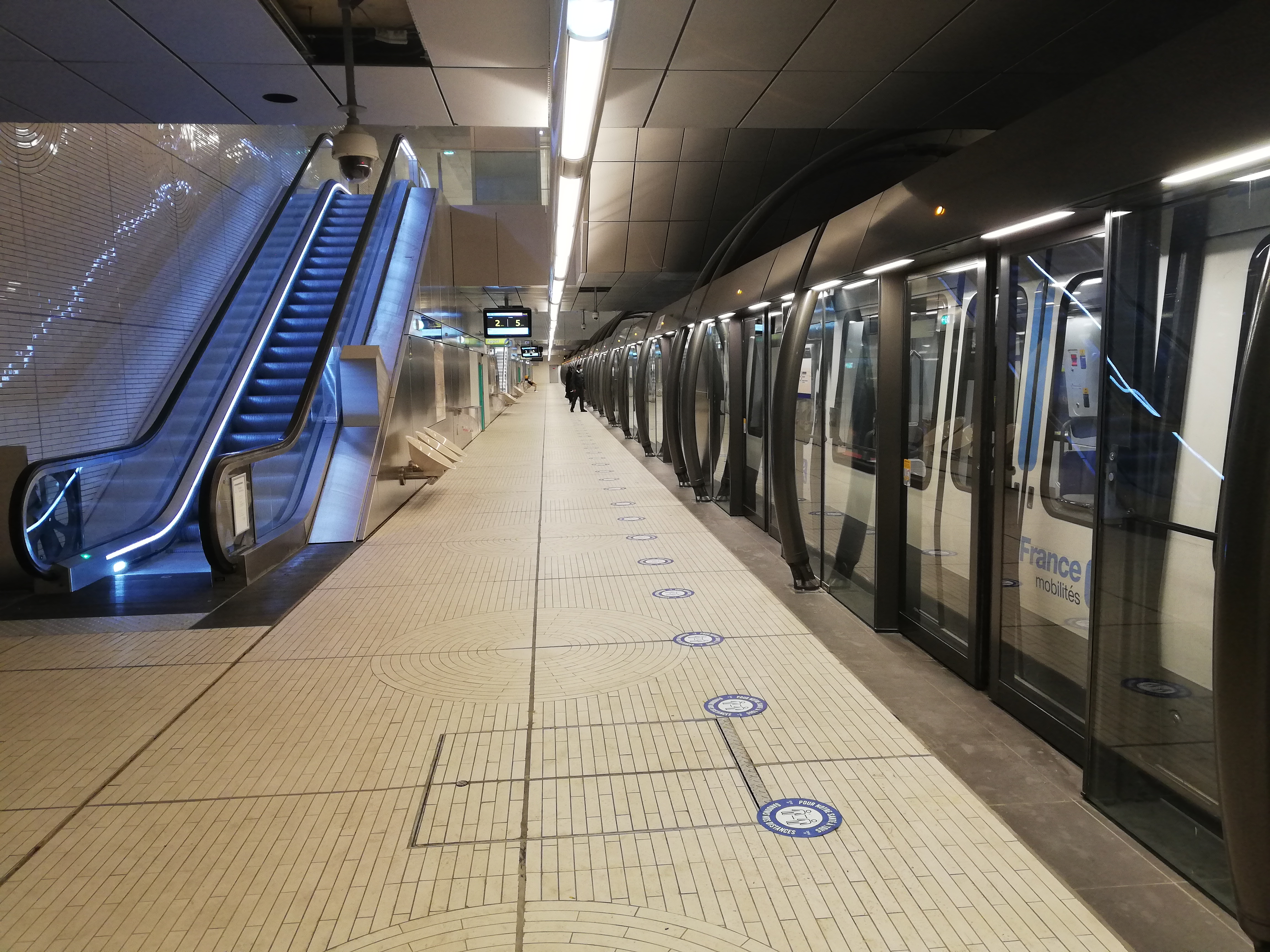
- MP 14 rolling stock of Line 14

General information
- Location: 17th arrondissement of Paris; Île-de-France; France
- Coordinates: 48°53′38″N 2°18′52″E
- Owner: RATP and SNCF
- Platforms: 2 (Line 13); 2 (RER C); 2 (Line 14)
- Tracks: 2 (Line 13); 2 (RER C); 2 (Line 14)
- Connections: RATP Bus: 28 54 74 163 173; Noctilien: N15 N51

Construction
- Accessible: Line 13/14: Yes; RER C: No

Other information
- Station code: 30-09 (Line 13); 87111278 (RER C)
- Fare zone: 2

History
- Opened: 20 January 1912
- Rebuilt: 1991, 2021

Passengers
- 2024: 3,647,167

Services
Preceding station	Paris Metro	Following station
Brochant towards Châtillon–Montrouge	Line 13 Les Courtilles branch	Mairie de Clichy towards Les Courtilles
Saint-Ouen towards Saint-Denis–Pleyel	Line 14	Pont Cardinet towards Aéroport d'Orly
Preceding station	RER	Following station
Saint-Ouen towards Pontoise	RER C	Pereire–Levallois towards Massy-Palaiseau or Dourdan-la-Forêt
Location
- Location within Paris

Porte de Clichy station (French pronunciation: [pɔʁt də kliʃi]) is a station on Line 13 and Line 14 of the Paris Métro and RER C, as well as a stop on Île-de-France tramway Line 3b. Located in the 17th arrondissement, the Métro station is situated on the northwestern branch of Line 13, under the Avenue de Clichy. It serves the Tribunal de grande instance de Paris. The station is named after the Porte de Clichy, a gate in the nineteenth century Thiers wall of Paris, which led to Clichy.

== History ==
The station opened 20 January 1912 with the inauguration of the second branch of Line B of the Nord-Sud Company from La Fourche, and formed the branch's terminus. On 27 March 1931, Line B became Line 13 of the Métro network. The station remained the line's terminus until 3 May 1980, when the extension to Gabriel Péri opened. As such, a loop track is provided at the northern end of the station for trains to terminate and return towards central Paris.

The RER station opened on 29 September 1991. On 24 November 2018, the Île-de-France tramway Line 3b was extended to Porte d'Asnières via Porte de Clichy. Porte de Clichy Métro station has had the free-out-of station interchange to tramway Line 3b.

One of the studied variants of the route of the extension of the RER E to the west would have served the station, but this route was excluded in February 2011 in favor of a route passing through Porte Maillot.

At the beginning of 2018, the sub-title Tribunal de Paris appeared on plan of the line as well as on the platforms, following the inauguration of the new Judicial City of Paris in February 2018.

In 2019, 4,495,978 travelers entered this station, which places it in the 97th position of metro stations for its use.

On 28 January 2021, the station platforms for Line 14 opened, as part of an extension of the line from Saint-Lazare to Saint-Ouen. The Line 14 mezzanine features four 60 metre long murals by British artist Julian Opie.

== Passenger services ==
=== Access ===
The station has seven entrances:

- 1 – located on cnr. Boulevard Berthier and Avenue de la Porte-de-Clichy- staircase;
- 2 – leading to Boulevard Bessieres and Avenue de la Porte-de-Clichy – staircase;
- 3 – intersection of Boulevard Bessieres and Avenue de la Porte-de-Clichy – escalator and staircase;
- 4 – cnr. Boulevard Bessieres and Avenue de la Porte-de-Clichy – elevator and escalators;
- 5 – cnr. Rue Andre Suares and Avenue de la Porte-de-Clichy – elevator, staircase and escalators;
- 6 – cnr. Boulevard Berthier and Avenue de la Porte-de-Clichy – escalator and staircase;
- 7 – Avenue de la Porte-de-Clichy – escalators.

=== Station layout ===
Street Level

Mezzanine

B2	Side platform, doors will open on the right
B2	Southbound	← toward Châtillon–Montrouge (Brochant)
B2	Northbound	toward Les Courtilles (Mairie de Clichy) →
B2	Side platform, doors will open on the right
B3	Side platform with PSDs, doors will open on the right
B3	Northbound	← toward Saint-Denis–Pleyel (Saint-Ouen)
B3	Southbound	toward Aéroport d'Orly (Pont Cardinet) →
B3	Side platform with PSDs, doors will open on the right

=== Platforms ===
==== Line 13 ====
Porte de Clichy is a station with an unusual configuration. It is made up of two non-parallel half-stations, 75 m long, located on the old turning loop and each includes a side platform track under an elliptical vault.

It has retained its characteristic decoration of the original Nord-Sud line with advertising frames and surrounds of the station name in a ceramic green colour (colour used for terminals and transfer stations) as well as the station name incorporated in white earthenware on a very large blue background between the advertising frames, only on the walls on the platform side. The name of the station is also inscribed in Parisine font on enamel plates on the track side. There are no geometric designs on the vault and walls, nor written directions on the ceramic tunnel entrances, which are all covered with bevelled white earthenware tiles.

This style has been combined since the 1980s with an Andreu-Motte style layout with an orange lighting canopy per half-station, as well as a bench in flat orange tiling with Motte seats in the same color. The station, with Pasteur and Porte de Versailles on line 12, ia one of three in the network to combine Andreu-Motte decoration with traditional Nord-Sud style ceramics.

==== Line 14 ====
The line 14 station runs parallel to Avenue de la Porte-de-Clichy, located under the ZAC Clichy-Batignolles buildings. The main entrance to the station is at the corner of Avenue de la Porte-de-Clichy and Boulevard Bessières. Two secondary entrance are located, one on the forecourt of the Cité judiciaire de Paris, at the corner of Avenue de la Porte-de-Clichy and Rue André-Suarès and the other at the corner of Boulevard Berthier and Avenue de la Porte-de-Clichy, to connect with the tram line T3b. Its realization is the work of the Eiffage TP/Razel-Bec.

The station is built on seven levels. It has a floor area of 8,954 m², a length of 120.5 m and a width of 20.65 m. Its platforms are located at a depth of 26 meters.

=== Other connections ===
The station connects with the RER C station, Pontoise branch. It is served by lines 28, 54, 74, 163 and 173 of the RATP Bus Network. The station is also served by tram line T3b (since 24 November 2018) and, at night, by lines N15 and N51 of the Noctilien bus network.

== Nearby ==
- Cité judiciaire de Paris
- Ateliers Berthier
- Parc Martin-Luther-King
- Cimetière des Batignolles
- Lycée Honoré-de-Balzac
- Gymnase Léon-Biancotto
- École 42

== Gallery ==
=== Métro ===
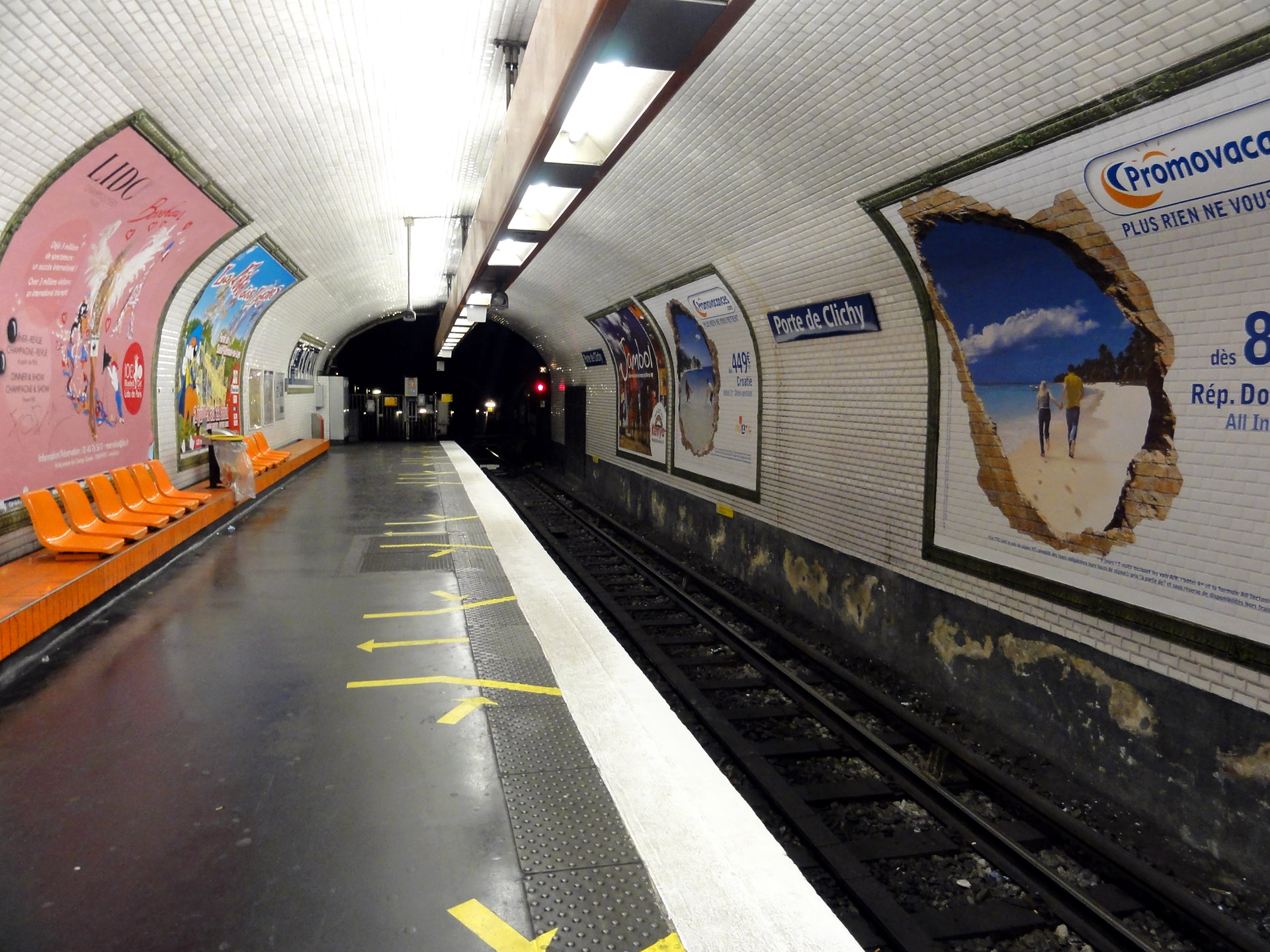
Line 13 platform

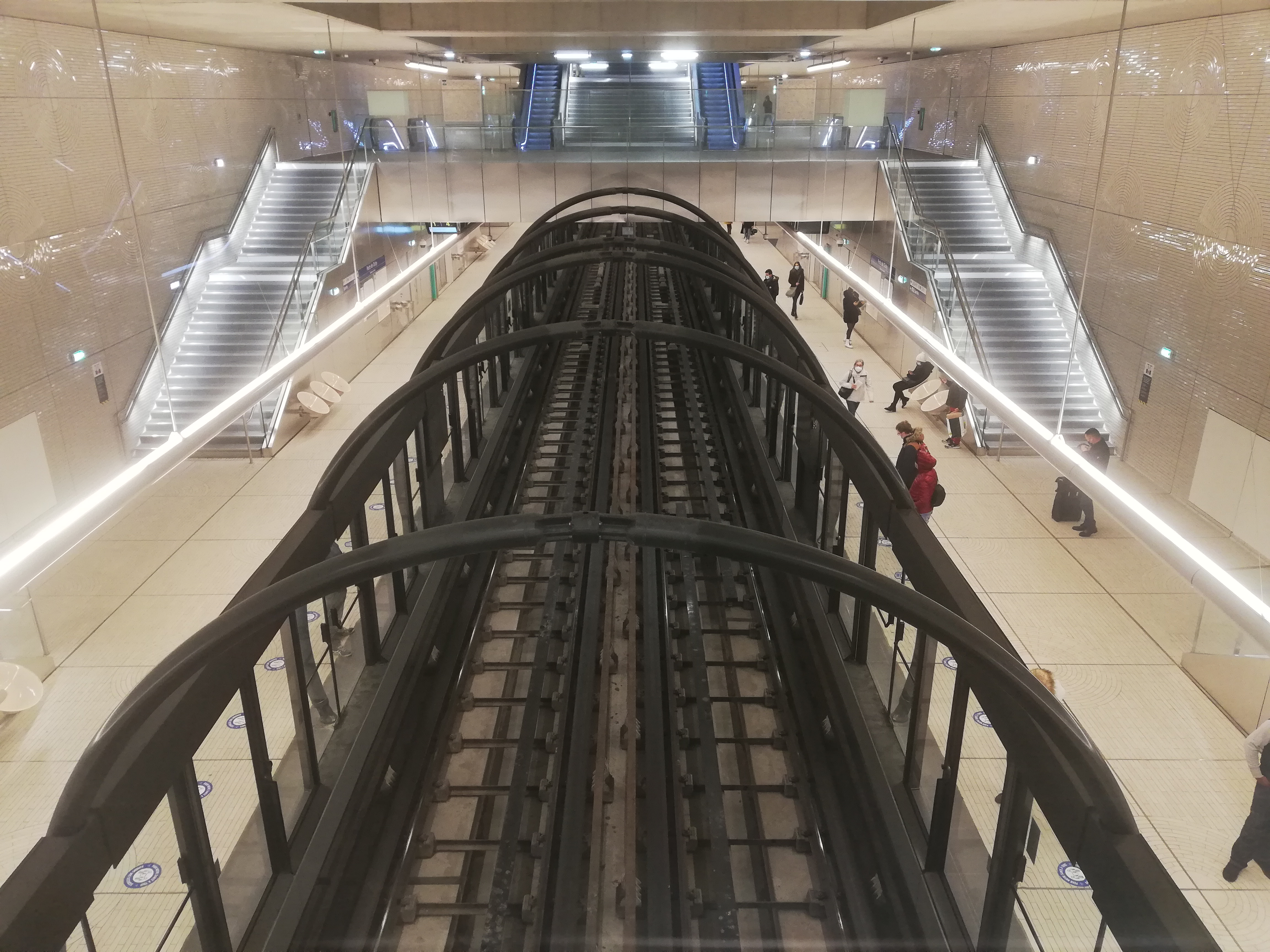
Line 14 platforms

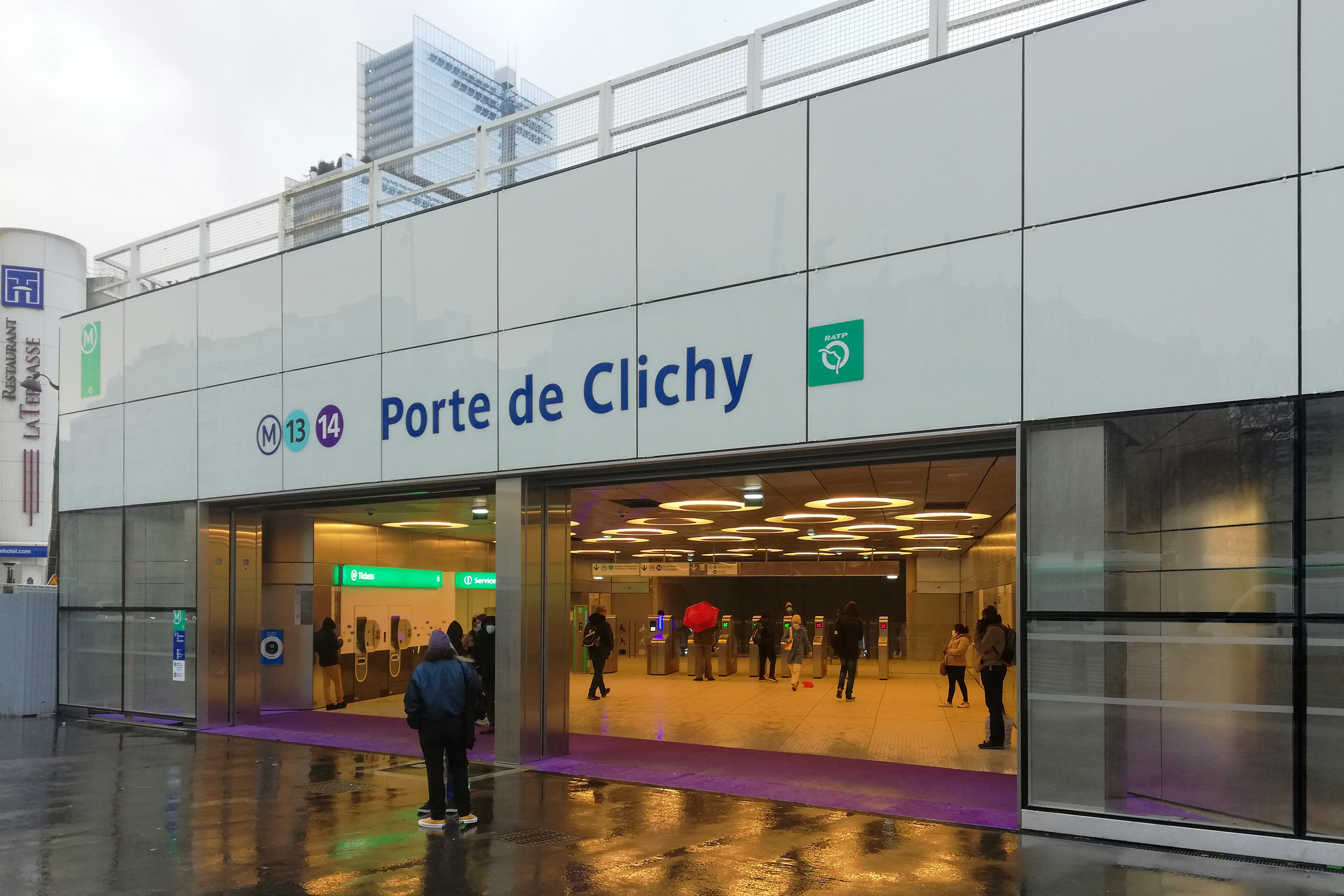
Porte de Clichy station entrance

=== Tramway ===
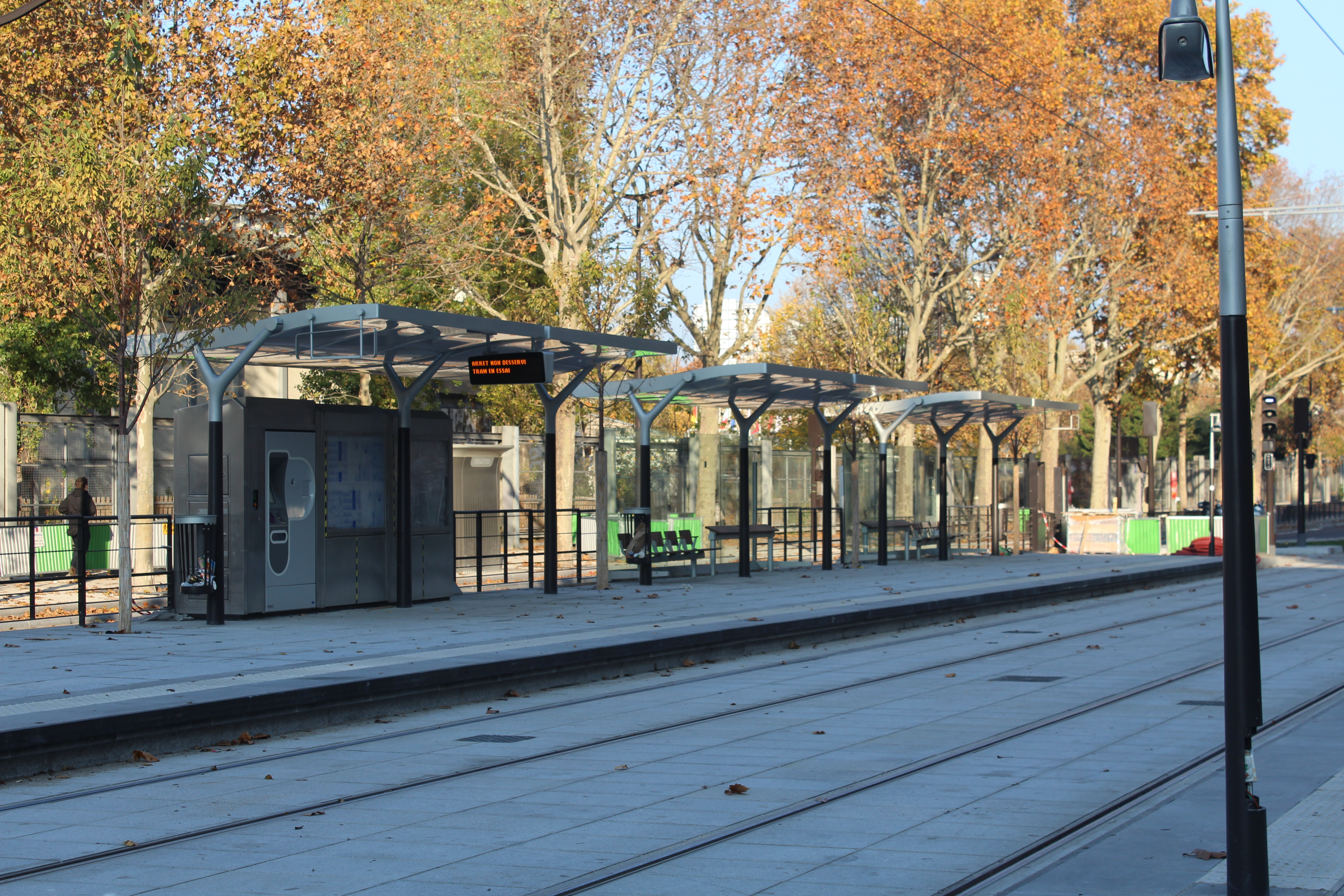
Porte de Clichy tramway stop

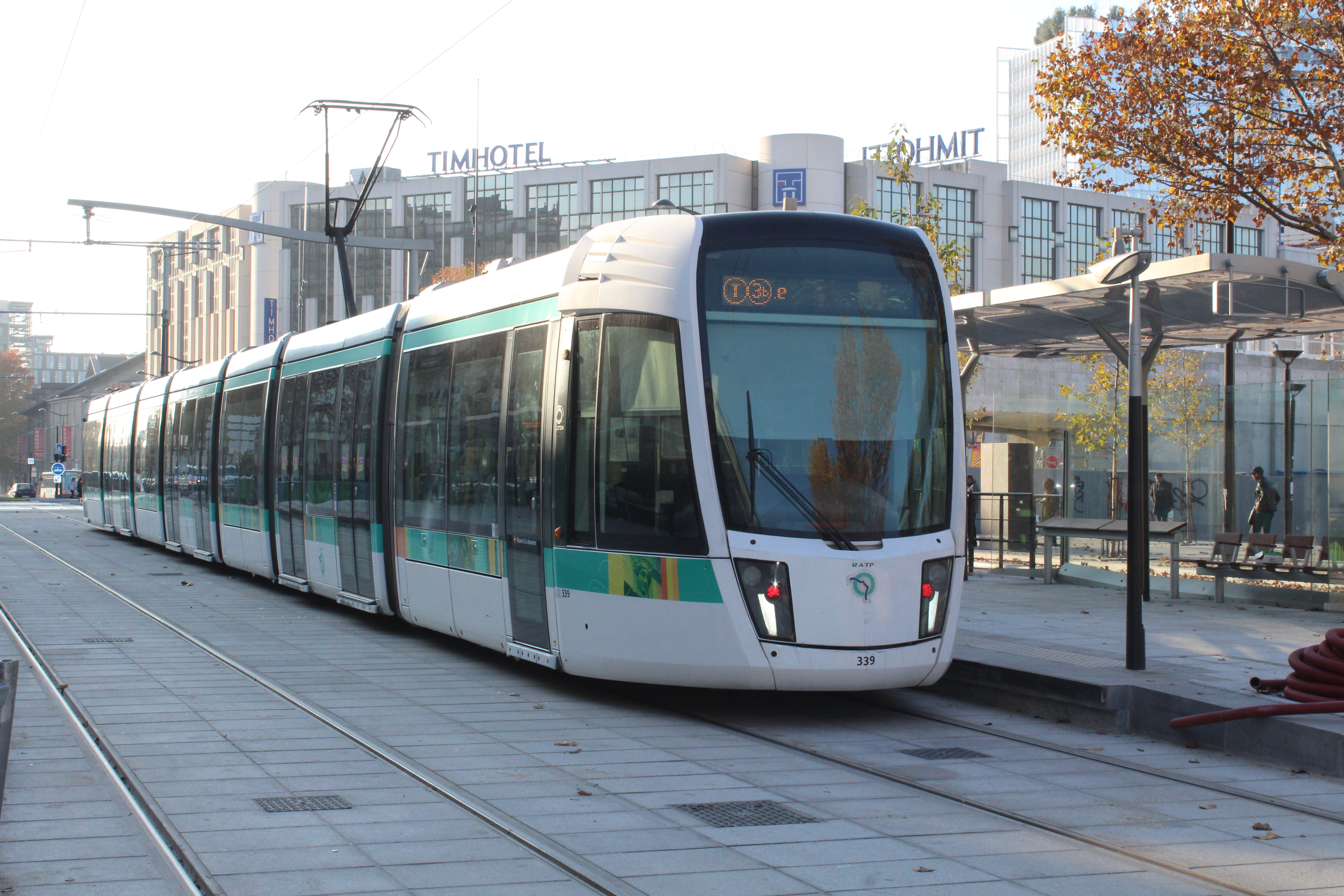
Alstom Citadis 402 at Porte de Clichy

=== RER ===
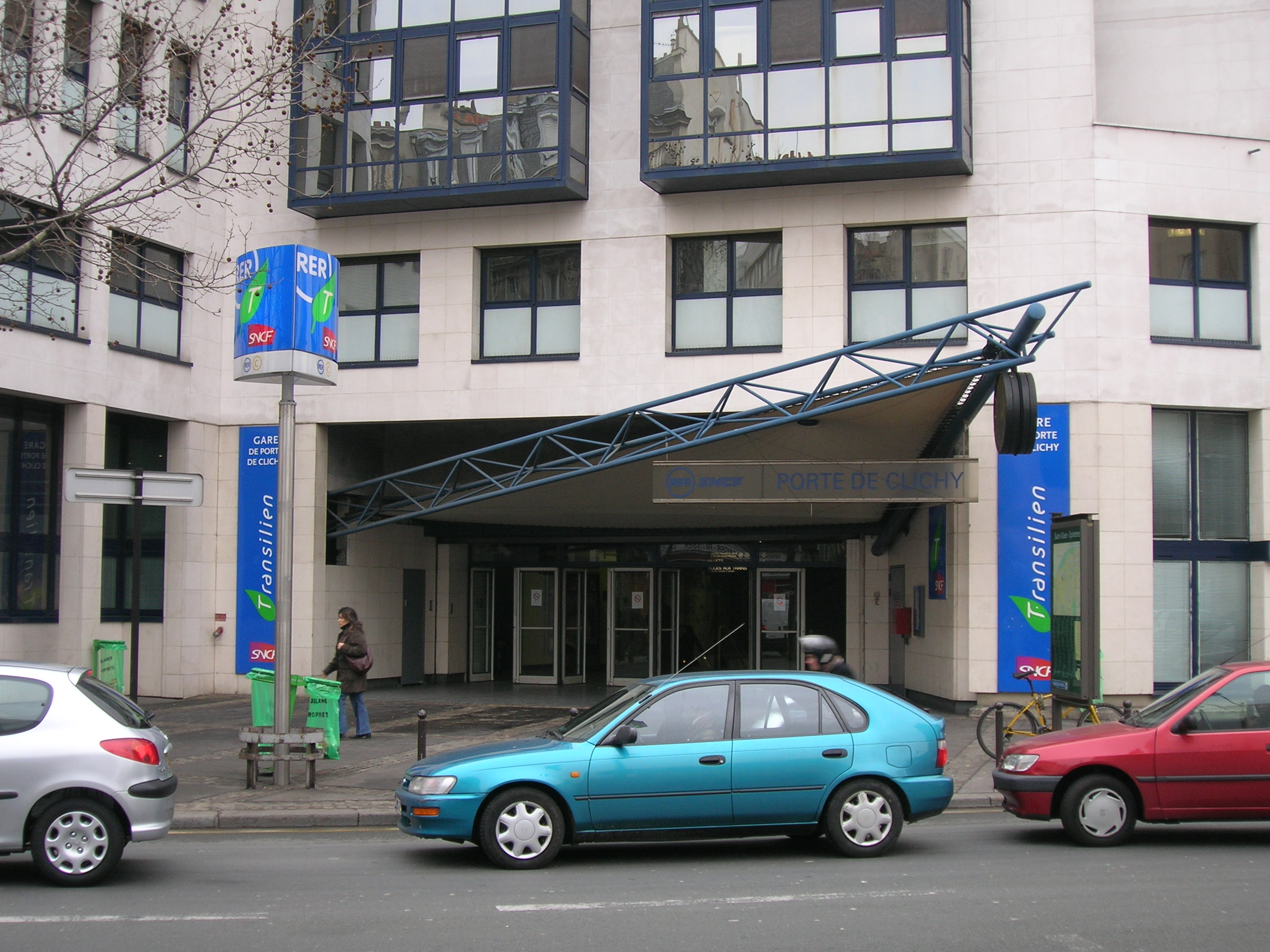
RER Porte de Clichy station entrance

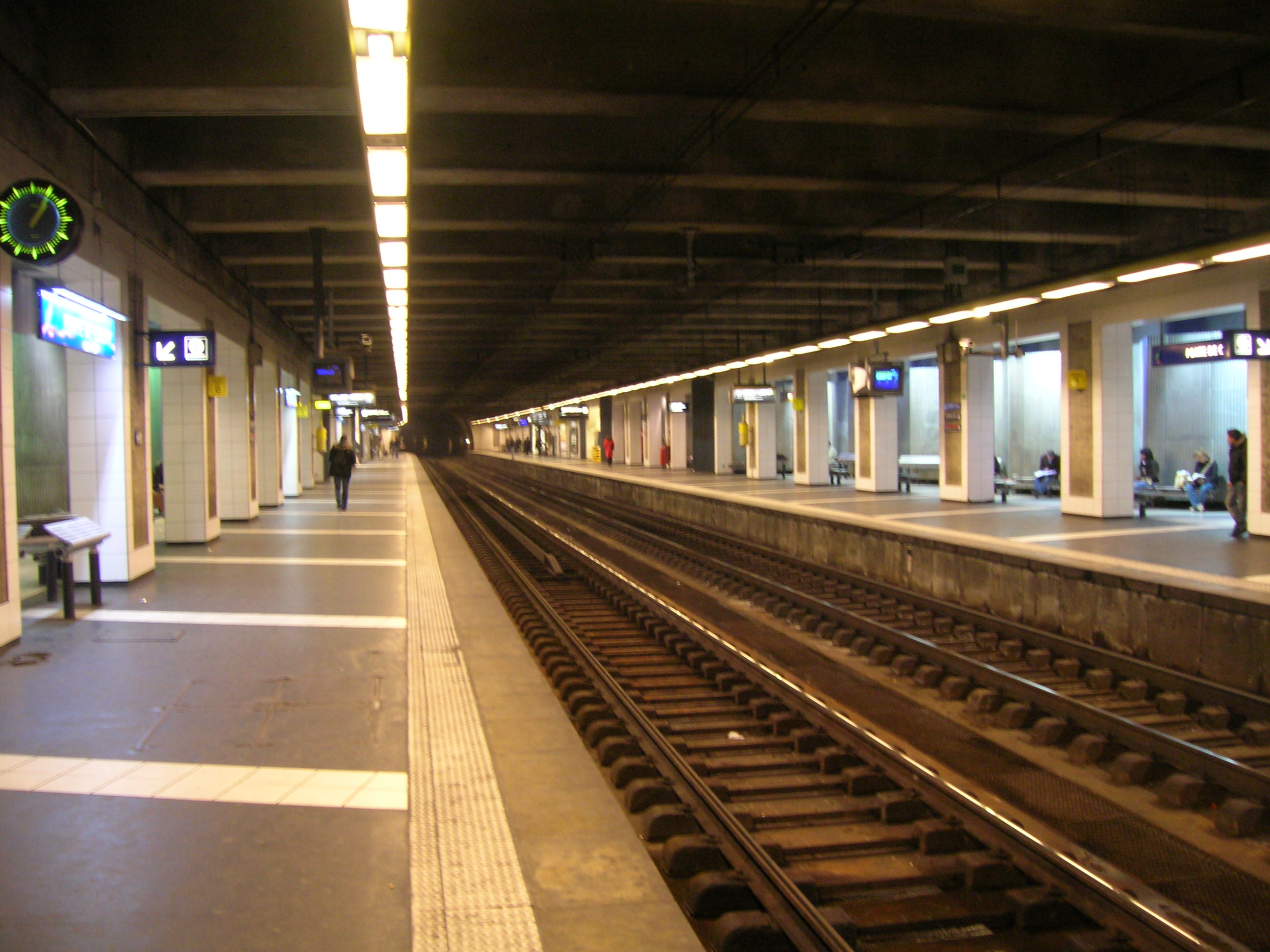
RER C platforms

== See also ==
- List of stations of the Paris Métro
- List of stations of the Paris RER
