= Madame Fritz =

French daguerreotype photographer (1807–1876)

- Born: Marie Agnès Anastasie Clemandot; 14 March 1807; Le Puy-en-Velay, Haute-Loire, France
- Died: 28 May 1876 (aged 69); Paris, France
- Burial place: Batignolles Cemetery
- Other name: Marie Agnès Anastasie Trachsler
- Occupation: Photographer
- Known for: Daguerreotype photography
- Spouse: Frédéric (Friedrich) Trachsler (m.1829–1832; divorced)

Madame Fritz (1807 – 1876) was the professional name of Marie Agnès Anastasie Clemandot, a French pioneer of daguerreotype photography, who travelled extensively in Spain and Portugal to sell her services.

== Early life ==
Clemandot was born on 14 March 1807, in Le Puy-en-Velay in the Haute-Loire department of the Auvergne-Rhône-Alpes region of France. Her father was a bookbinder and bookseller in the town.

On 10 December 1829 she married Frédéric (Friedrich) Trachsler, from Zurich, Switzerland, who was linked to a notable family of engravers and printers from Zurich. After their marriage, they moved to Zurich. Between 1830 and 1834 Trachsler ran a business selling art objects, books, engravings and prints, in which Clemandot probably collaborated or even took over, although she was already listed as divorced in 1832, just three years after her marriage. Even so, she continued to keep the surname Trachsler, as was often the case. Trachsler was fighting in Greece and died in Nafplio in 1835. She returned to France in the mid-1930s. In 1837 she was working as a ribbon merchant in Paris, although in August of that year she was declared bankrupt. The shop was in a business district and she may have been exposed to photography in shops there. In January 1839, Louis Daguerre described his invention at a joint meeting of the French Academy of Sciences and the Académie des Beaux Arts. It is improbable that Clemandot was present at this meeting but she did benefit from a subsequent decision by Daguerre, which was to sell the rights to his invention to the French government, in exchange for a lifetime pension. In 1839, the French presented the invention as a gift from France to the world and complete working instructions were published.

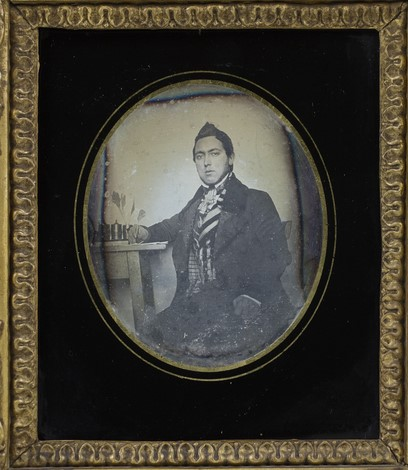
Photo by Madame Fritz

== Career as a photographer ==
On 31 December 1842, the "Journal des Pyrénées orientales" carried an announcement on page 3 by a "Madame Fritz" who offered to make daguerreotype portraits in Perpignan, a city close to the Spanish border. At that time only a few men had mastered the process developed by Daguerre and people were surprised to learn of a woman offering such a service. It is not clear how she had learned to use Daguerre's process, but with instructions then being freely available she was possibly self-taught. There is no information about how she got the name "Fritz".

There is no evidence that Madame Fritz made portraits in the French cities she visited before arriving in Perpignan in December 1842. In her advertisement, she stated that "Madame Fritz has the honour of informing the public that she makes portraits with a Daguerreotype, in the shade, in half a minute, and by a new process. This lady will transport her daguerreotype to the people of the sex who will do her the honour of calling her, provided that she is assured of four portraits to be made. She will stay in Perpignan until January 5." On 14 January 1843, she informed her clients that she would stay longer, "having many portraits to make". She was also selling cameras and offering to give photography lessons.

At that time it was unusual for women to travel alone, but in May 1843 Madame Fritz made her first portraits in Barcelona, returning there in May 1845. Business went well in 1843 and she was soon advertising for an assistant to help her clean and polish the photographic plates. In October 1843 she was in Madrid. At that time she was not only advertising her photographic services but also indicating that she sold "products related to barbering and surgery". At the beginning of 1844 she was in Córdoba, announcing that "Madame Fritz has the honour of letting the public know that she makes all kinds of portraits in daguerreotype, in the shade, coloured and uncoloured, of all dimensions, from the sixth part of natural size to the smallest, by a method of her own, in the time of eight to fifteen seconds". She then went to Cádiz before moving to Portugal, arriving in Lisbon in 1844. She would also work in Porto. In Portugal she was confident enough to announce that "the similarity and perfection of the said portraits are equal to those of the most famous chemists and portrait painters of France and Germany, and this is due to the instruments and practice that the said lady has". She did not stay in Portugal very long as she was in Valencia at the end of 1844, staying there for some time, before returning to Barcelona, where she rented rooms rather than staying at an inn. There is some evidence that she married another itinerant photographer, named Durrieu, while she was in Valencia although it is possible that this was a fictitious marriage in order to appear more respectable. In August 1946 she was in Zaragoza.

Her works seem to have been well accepted in both Spain and Portugal, perhaps in part because there were fewer travelling photographers in those countries than in France. Also, while other travelling photographers would establish their studios in the hotels or guest houses in which they were staying, some of the advertisements of Fritz indicate that she was often prepared to take her equipment to the home of the customer. This may have been because the camera she carried was of smaller dimensions than those used by other daguerreotypistes. Before definitively returning to France, her work also took her to Hong Kong and the Philippines.

Photographic studios bearing the Fritz name were established in Lisbon and Portugal in the 1850s. A connection between these and Madame Fritz has not been established and it seems likely that these were owned by the photographer, Joachim Friedrich Martin Fritz. It is believed that Madame Fritz did return to Portugal with her family in the 1850s but there is no conclusive proof that the photographic studios bearing her name were connected with her.

== Death ==
After ending her career in Portugal, Madame Fritz returned to France. She died on 28 May 1876, at her home in the 16th arrondissement of Paris, a relatively affluent area of the city. She was buried in Batignolles Cemetery.
