= Gabriel Péri station =

Metro station in Paris, France

Gabriel Péri
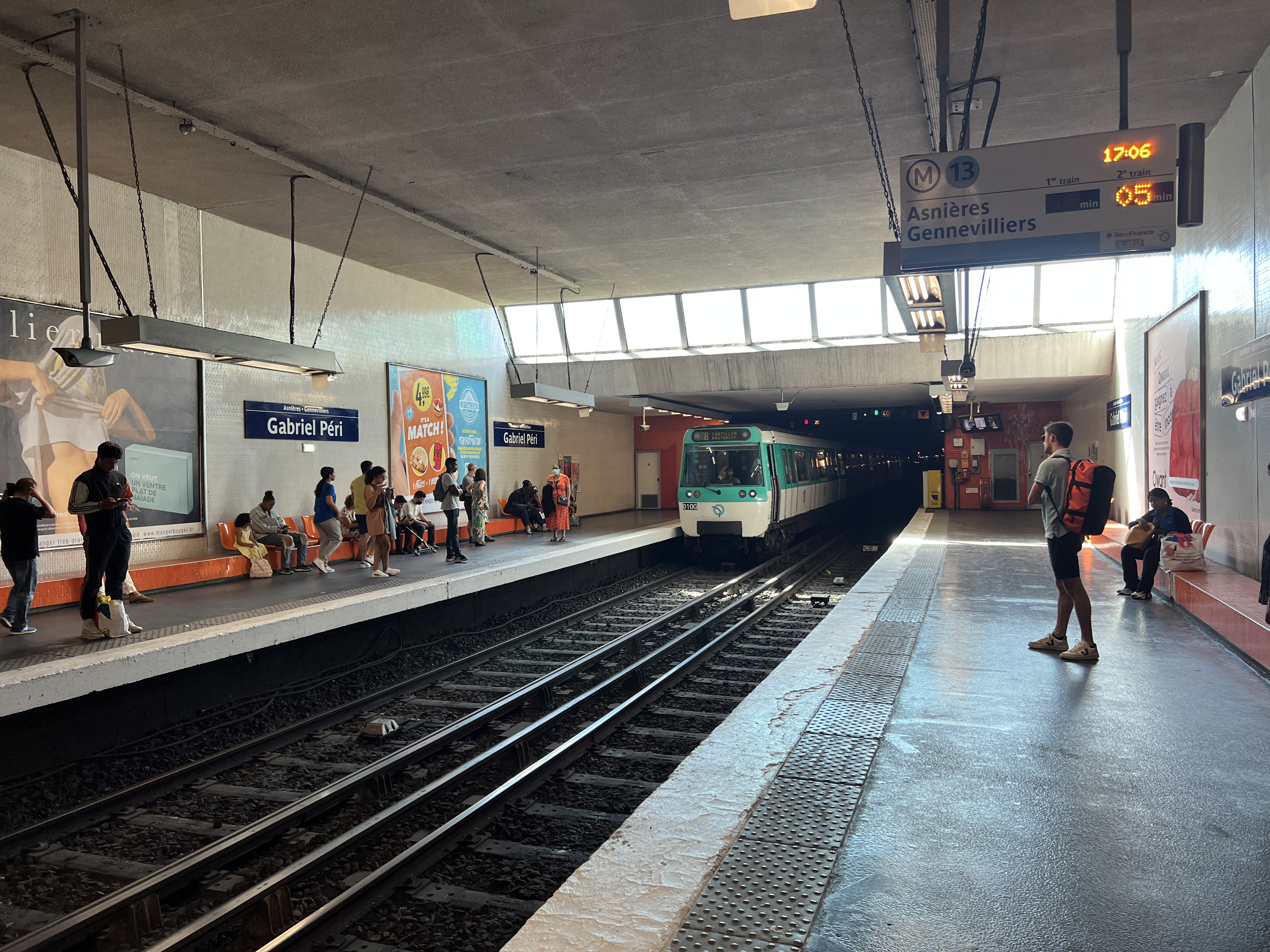
- Platforms at Gabriel Péri

General information
- Location: Asnières-sur-Seine and Gennevilliers; Île-de-France; France
- Coordinates: 48°55′00″N 2°17′40″E
- System: Paris Métro station
- Owner: RATP
- Operator: RATP
- Platforms: 2
- Tracks: 2

Other information
- Station code: 19-02
- Fare zone: 3

History
- Opened: 3 May 1980

Services
Preceding station	Paris Metro	Following station
Mairie de Clichy towards Châtillon–Montrouge	Line 13 Les Courtilles branch	Les Agnettes towards Les Courtilles
Location
- Location within Paris and inner ring

Gabriel Péri (French pronunciation: [ɡabʁijɛl peʁi]) is a station on Line 13 of the Paris Métro. Situated on the line's northwestern branch, it is located under the Rue des Bas on the border between the communes of Gennevilliers and Asnières-sur-Seine in Hauts-de-Seine.

== History ==
The station opened on 3 May 1980 upon completion of the extension of Line 13 from Porte de Clichy; it was the terminal station until 14 June 2008 when the extension to Les Courtilles opened. At that time, its name was changed from Gabriel Péri–Asnières–Gennevilliers to its present name. The station honours journalist Gabriel Péri (1902–1941) who served as a member of the Chamber of Deputies for Seine-et-Oise. He was shot by the Nazis because of his involvement in the French Resistance in World War II.

In 2019, 4,998,394 travelers entered this station, which places it in the 82nd position of metro stations for its use.

== Passenger services ==
=== Access ===
The station has three entrances, one leading to Avenue Gabriel-Péri straddling the municipalities of Asnières-sur-Seine and Gennevilliers, the second on Rue des Bas à Asnières, and the last overlooking the bus station located just above the metro station.

=== Station layout ===
Street Level

Mezzanine

B2	Side platform, doors will open on the right
B2	Northbound	← toward Les Courtilles (Les Agnettes)
B2	Southbound	toward Châtillon–Montrouge (Mairie de Clichy) →
B2	Side platform, doors will open on the right

=== Platform ===
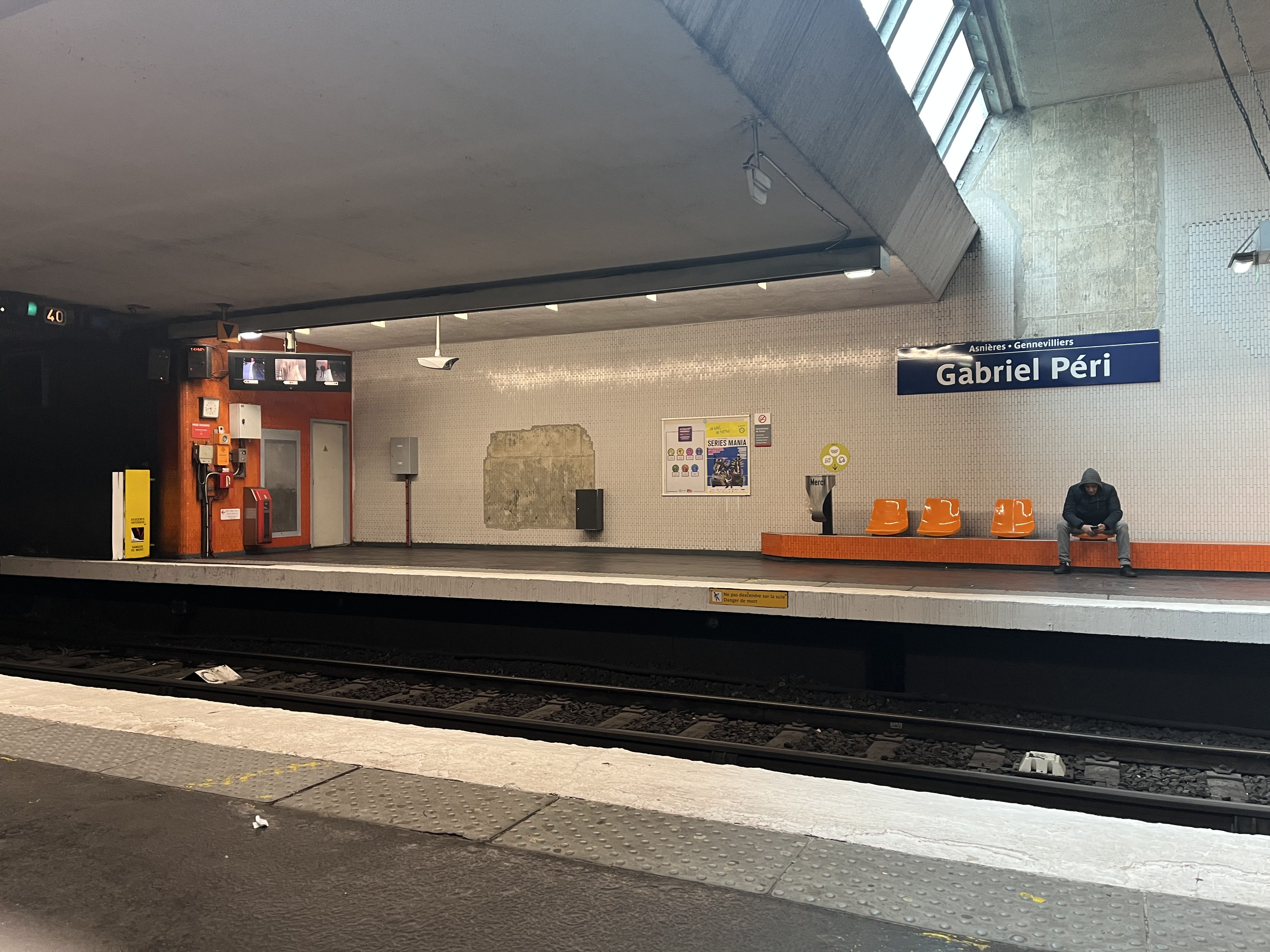
Metro Ligne 13 - Gabriel Peri

Gabriel Péri is a station with the typical architecture of suburban stations from 1975 to 1985 (just like Fort d'Aubervilliers or Bobigny - Pantin - Raymond Queneau). A standard configuration with two platforms separated by the metro tracks, it is built in a trench very close to the surface, in the form of a box, rectangular architecture with a flat ceiling. Like many extension stations in the suburbs of this period, Gabriel Péri is decorated in orange Andreu-Motte style. A bay window allows daylight to enter the station. On the south side, the tracks are overlooked by a mezzanine which houses the ticket hall. The platform towards Les Courtilles has an escalator to access the exit.

=== Bus connections ===
The station, built under a bus station, is served by lines 54, 140, 175, 177, 235, 340 and 577 of the RATP Bus Network and, at night, by lines N15 and N51 of the Noctilien network.

== See also ==
- List of stations of the Paris Métro
