= Gabriel Péri =

French journalist and politician (1902–1941)

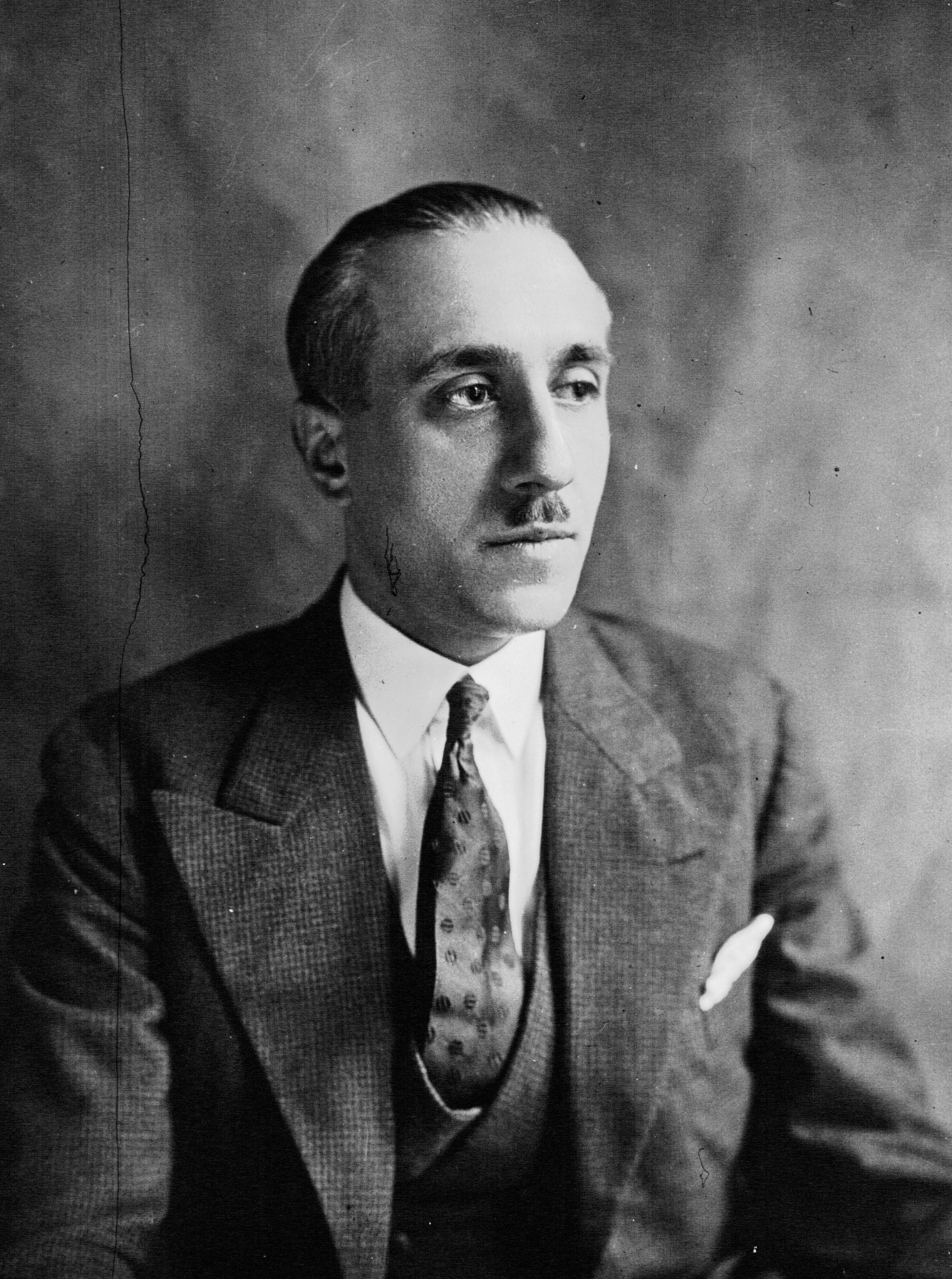
Péri in 1932

Gabriel Péri (French pronunciation: [ɡabʁiɛl peʁi]; 9 February 1902 — 15 December 1941) was a prominent French communist journalist and politician who served in the Chamber of Deputies from 1932 to 1940 for Seine-et-Oise. A member of the French Resistance in World War II, he was executed in German-occupied France at Fort Mont-Valérien. He was deemed Mort pour la France.

== Early life ==
Péri was born in Toulon to a Corsican family. Forced to give up his studies at an early age, the First World War and Russian Revolution had a profound effect on him and his involvement in revolutionary politics. He immersed himself in political activities, and wrote for newspapers in Aix-en-Provence and Marseille.

== Career and execution ==
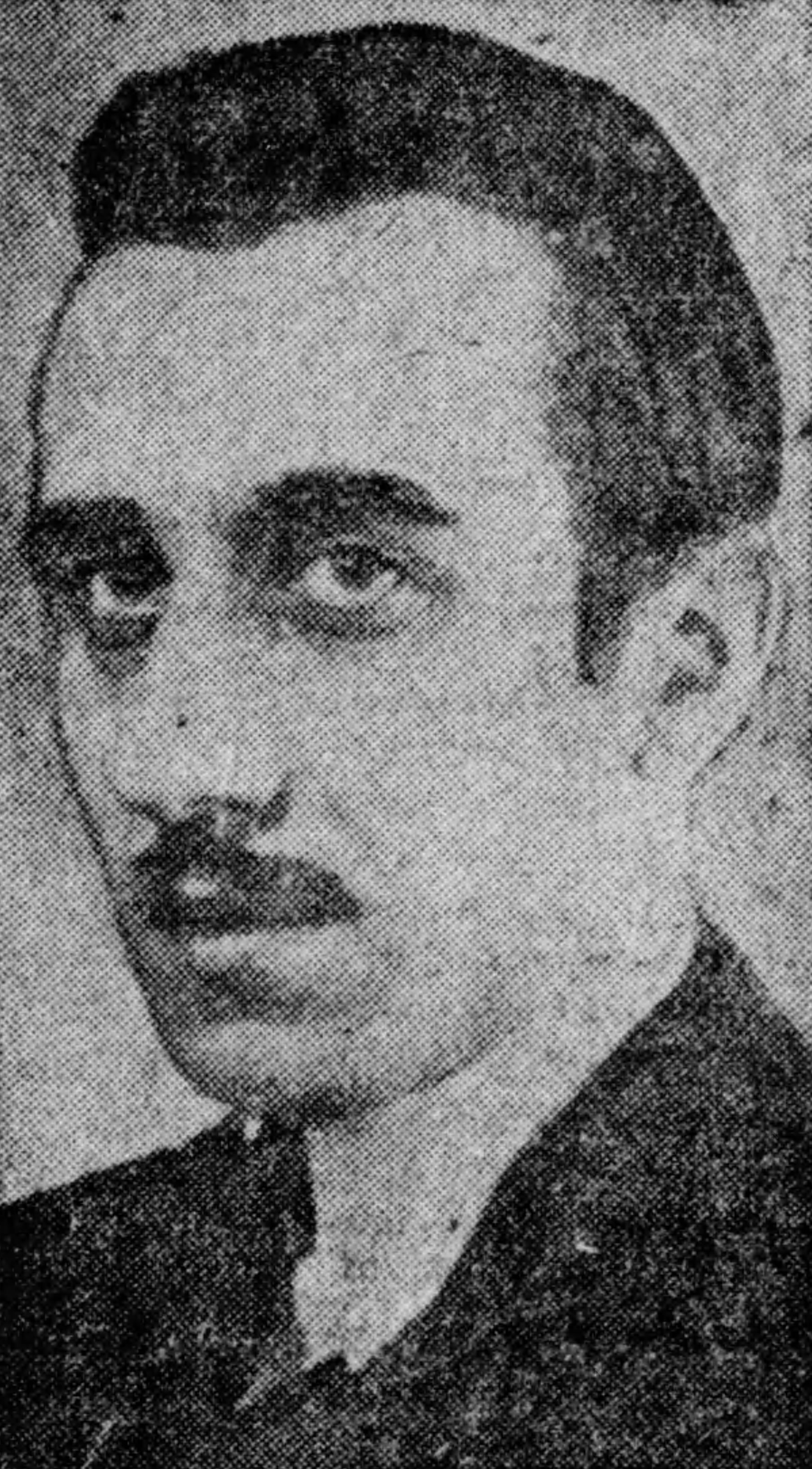
Péri c. 1928

At the age of 22, Péri became departmental manager of foreign politics at l'Humanité. He was elected deputy to the French National Assembly for Argenteuil in 1932 and re-elected in 1936.

In the National Assembly, Péri distinguished himself as an expert in the field of diplomatic and international relations and was a strident antifascist. He denounced both Benito Mussolini's invasion of Ethiopia and France's non-intervention during the Spanish Civil War. Péri was also a prominent opponent of the Nazi regime in Germany.

On 21 January 1940, however, after the German-Soviet Pact, he was stripped of his mandate to the National Assembly, and on 3 April, he was sentenced to five years in military prison, fined and stripped of his civic and political rights for reconstituting a legally-dissolved organization. He went into hiding as a result.

The Fall of France in 1940 resulted in the German occupation of northern France. Arrested by the French police on 18 May 1941, Péri was jailed at Fort Mont-Valérien, which was under the control of the German forces. He was executed there on 15 December with a group of 70 men. Albert Camus learned of Péri's execution while he was staying in Lyon, an event that he later said crystallised his own revolt against the Germans.

== Legacy ==
Many French schools and streets have been named after Péri, as well as a Paris metro station and another in Lyon. Paul Éluard and Louis Aragon wrote poems in his honor (titled "Gabriel Péri" and "Ballade de Celui Qui Chanta Dans les Supplices" ["Ballad to He who Sings While Being Tortured"], respectively).
