= Les Agnettes station =

Metro station in Paris, France

Asnières - Gennevilliers Les Agnettes
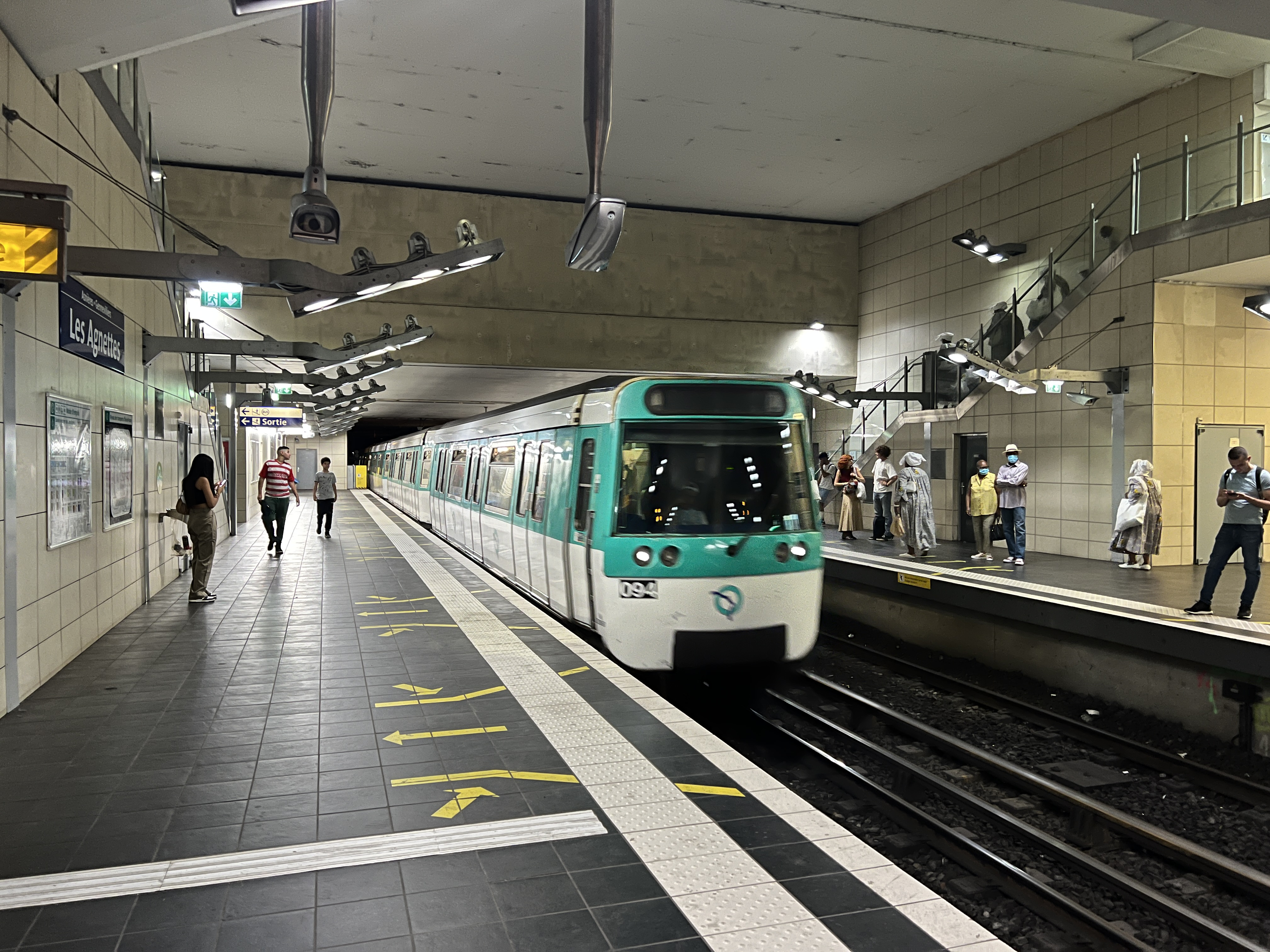
- MF 77 at the station

General information
- Location: Asnières-sur-Seine and Gennevilliers; Île-de-France; France
- Coordinates: 48°55′23″N 2°17′09″E
- System: Paris Métro station
- Owner: RATP
- Operator: RATP
- Line: Paris Metro Paris Metro Line 13
- Platforms: Line 13: 2 side platforms; Line 15: 2 side platforms
- Tracks: Line 13: 2; Line 15: 2

Construction
- Depth: Line 15: 28 m (92 ft)
- Accessible: yes
- Architect: Line 15: AIA Life Designer

Other information
- Station code: 19-03
- Fare zone: 3

History
- Opened: 14 June 2008

Passengers
- 1,890,356 (2021)

Services
Preceding station	Paris Metro	Following station
Gabriel Péri towards Châtillon–Montrouge	Line 13 Les Courtilles branch	Les Courtilles Terminus
Location
- Location within Paris and inner ring

Les Agnettes (French pronunciation: [lez‿aɲɛt]) is a station on line 13 of the Paris Métro. In the future, it will also be served by line 15 as part of the Grand Paris Express network. It is situated on the line's northwestern branch, under rue Robert Dupont and rue des Bas, on the border of the communes of Gennevilliers and Asnières-sur-Seine in Hauts-de-Seine.

It is named after the nearby street, rue des Agnettes.

== Location ==
The station is located at the crossroads of the D11 and D19 roads in the Hauts-de-Seine.

== History ==
The station opened on 14 June 2008 with the line extension from Gabriel Péri to Les Courtilles. The extension comprised 1.88km of new track and two new stations, including Les Agnettes, with construction having started in 2004 at a cost of €158 million, after a declaration of public utility on 31 January 2002. The new section was projected to serve 23,000 passengers at the time.

In 2019, the station was used by 2,309,419 passengers, making it the 224th busiest of the Métro network out of 302 stations.

In 2020, the station was used by 1,283,180 passengers amidst the COVID-19 pandemic, making it the 200th busiest of the Métro network out of 304 stations.

In 2021, the station was used by 1,890,356 passengers, making it the 189th busiest of the Métro network out of 304 stations.

=== Future Line 15 station ===
Preparatory work on line 15's station began in July 2017 and was completed in 2025. This included the relocation of underground utilities and the demolition of buildings along 11-21 rue des Agnettes to make way for the future site of the station.

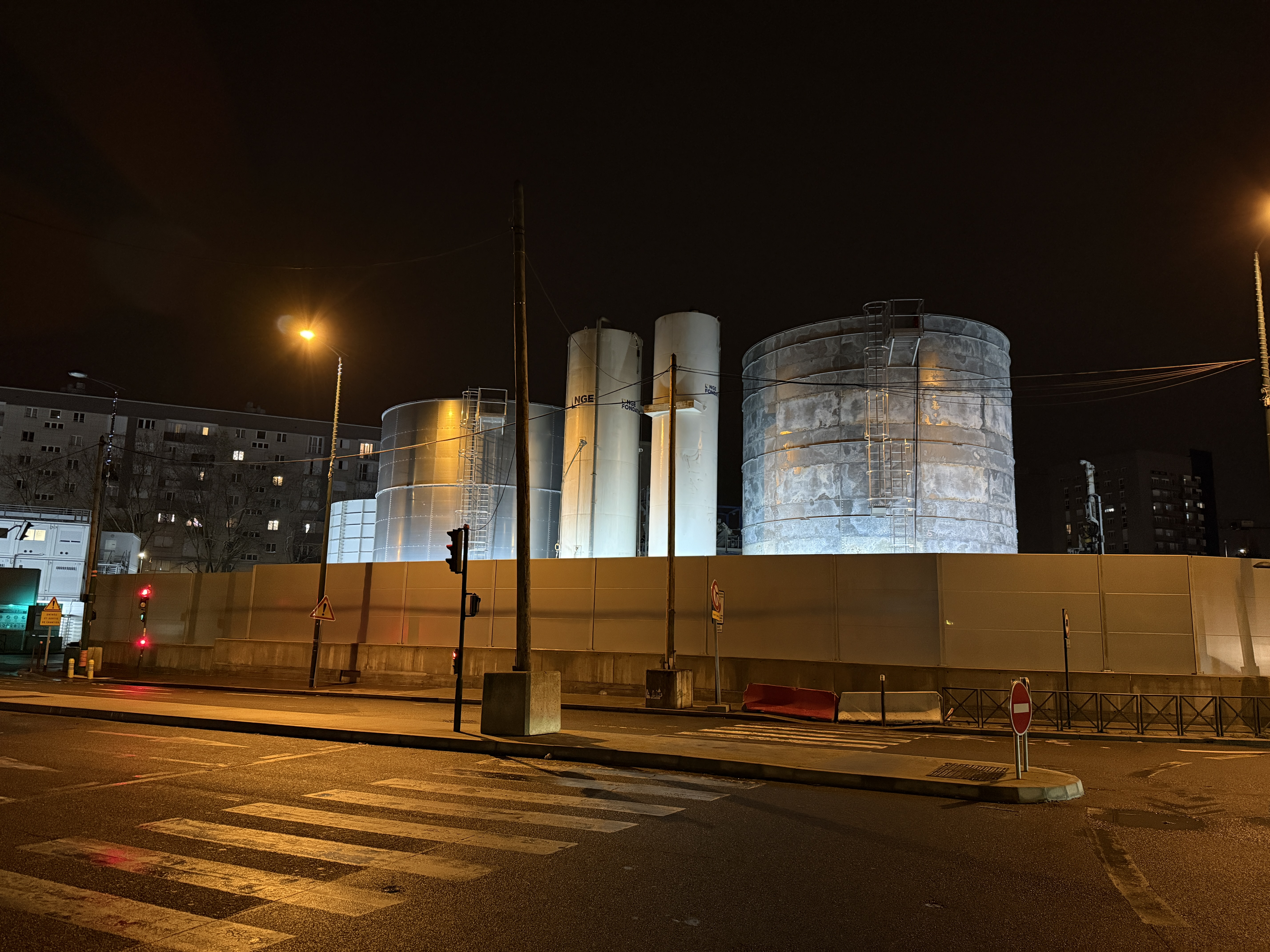
Works for line 15 in 2026

The €1.38 billion contract for civil works was awarded to NGE in May 2024, which included the construction of 7km of tunnels and 4 new stations, including Les Agnettes. This began in January 2026 with the construction of the diaphragm walls and excavation of the future transfer corridor with line 13. The station will have two new entrances directly connected to a new surface building with multiple skylights to illuminate the interior of the station down to the transfer level. Space for new shops and bicycle parking will be provided, with a new residential development to be built above the station.

An artwork by Seugli Lee will be installed above the stairs of the atrium in the future line 15 station. Titled "AGNETTE!", it was inspired by stories from the surrounding neighbourhood, including that of the former Chenard & Walcker factory, as well as the etymology of the word Agnette. It is composed of several rotating vertical plates and curved lines, each coloured only on one side. It will be suspended from the ceiling, with it being 10m tall and 3m wide.

It is projected to open in late 2031 and is estimated to serve 50,000 passengers a day.

== Passenger services ==
=== Access ===
The station has two accesses:

- Access 1: rue des Bas
- Access 2: rue Émile Zola

=== Station layout ===
Street Level
B1	Mezzanine
Platform level	Side platform, doors will open on the right
Platform level	Northbound	← toward Les Courtilles (terminus)
Platform level	Southbound	toward Châtillon – Montrouge (Gabriel Péri) →
Platform level	Side platform, doors will open on the right

=== Platforms ===
Line 13's station is of standard configuration with two tracks surrounded by two side platforms.

=== Other connections ===
The station is served by lines 178, 238, and 366 of the RATP Bus Network and, at night, by line N51 of the Noctilien bus network.

== Gallery ==
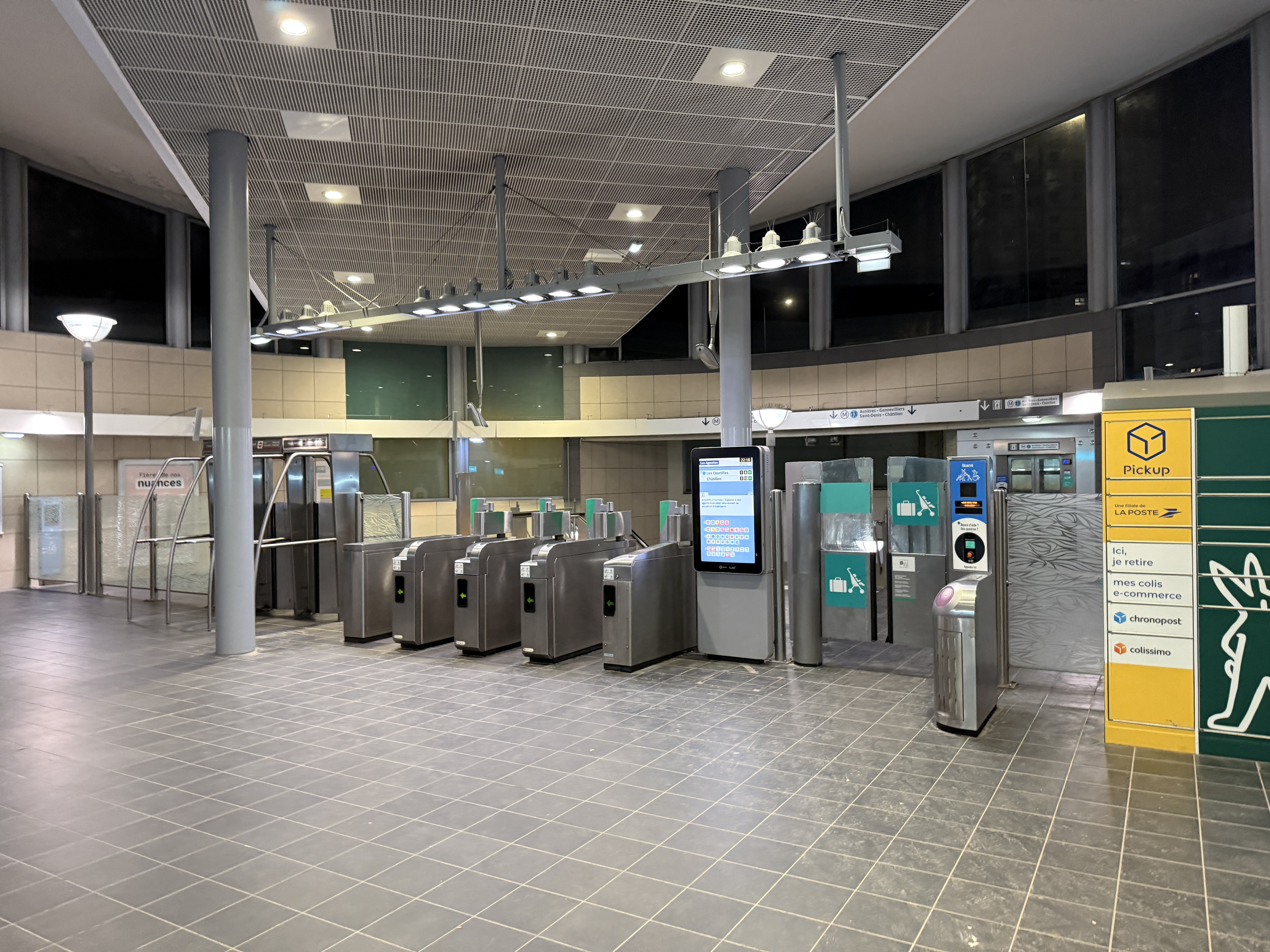
Interior of the surface building

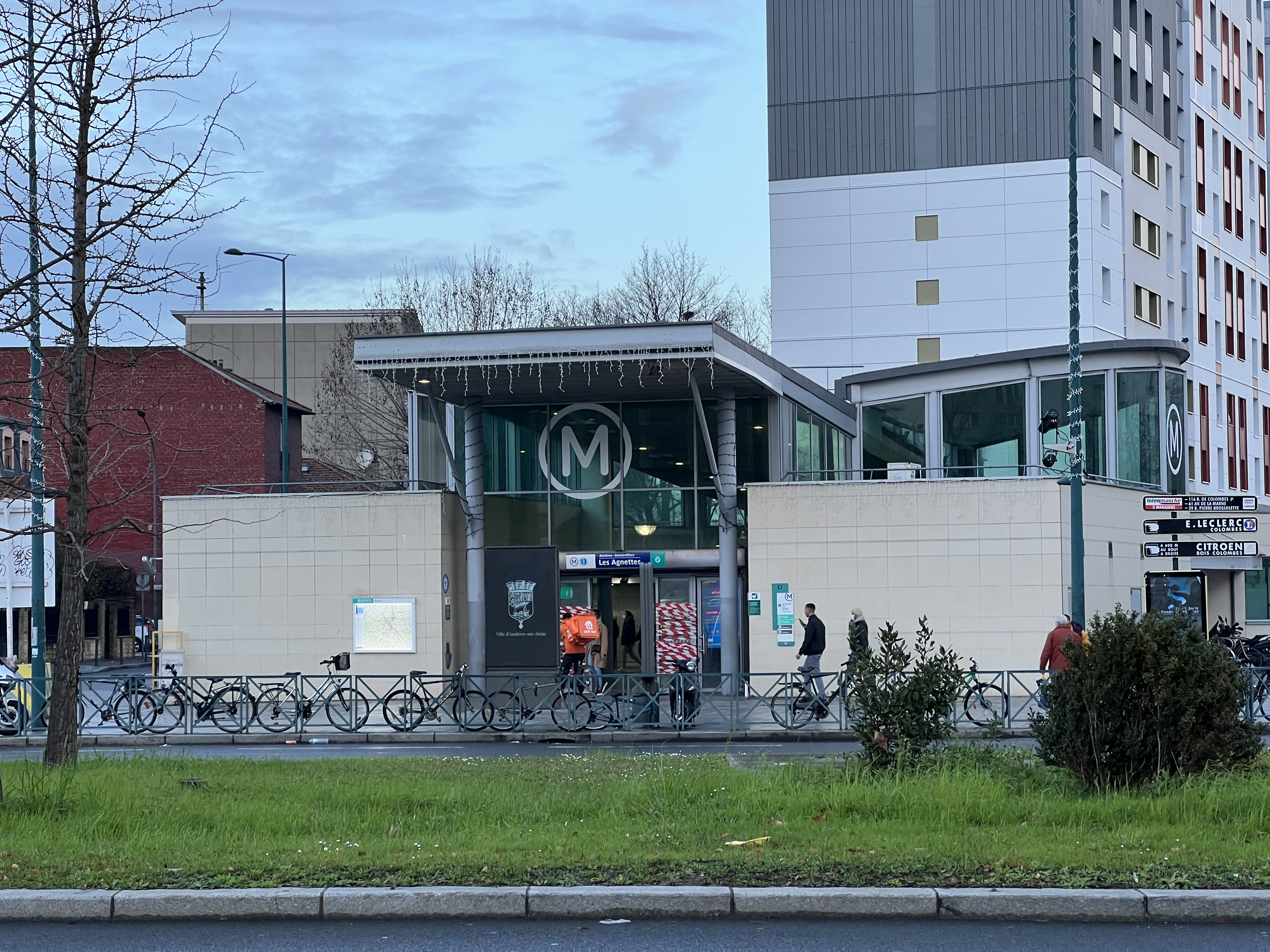
Access 1

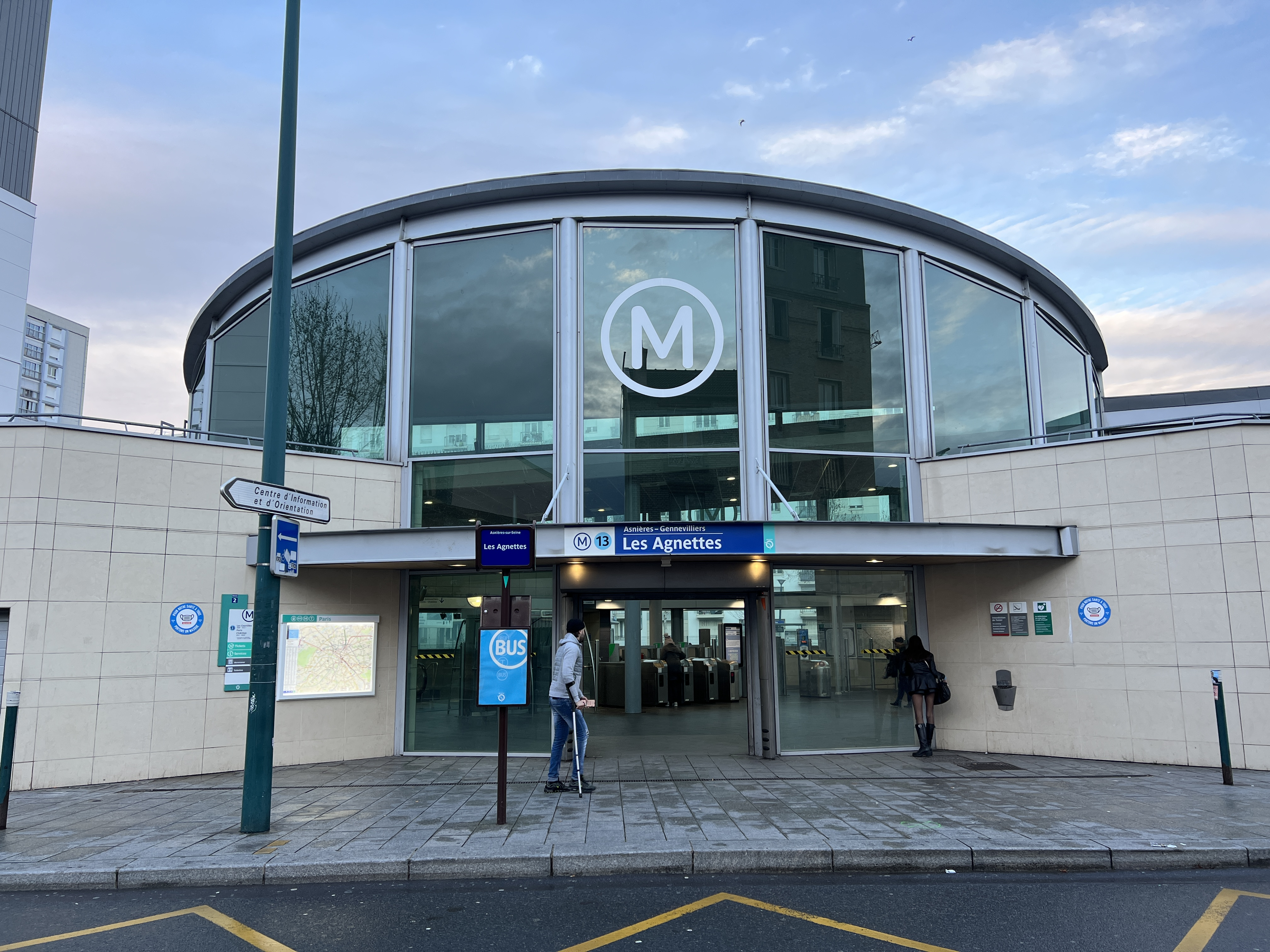
Access 2

== See also ==
- List of stations of the Paris Métro
