= Brochant station =

Station on the Paris Metro

Brochant
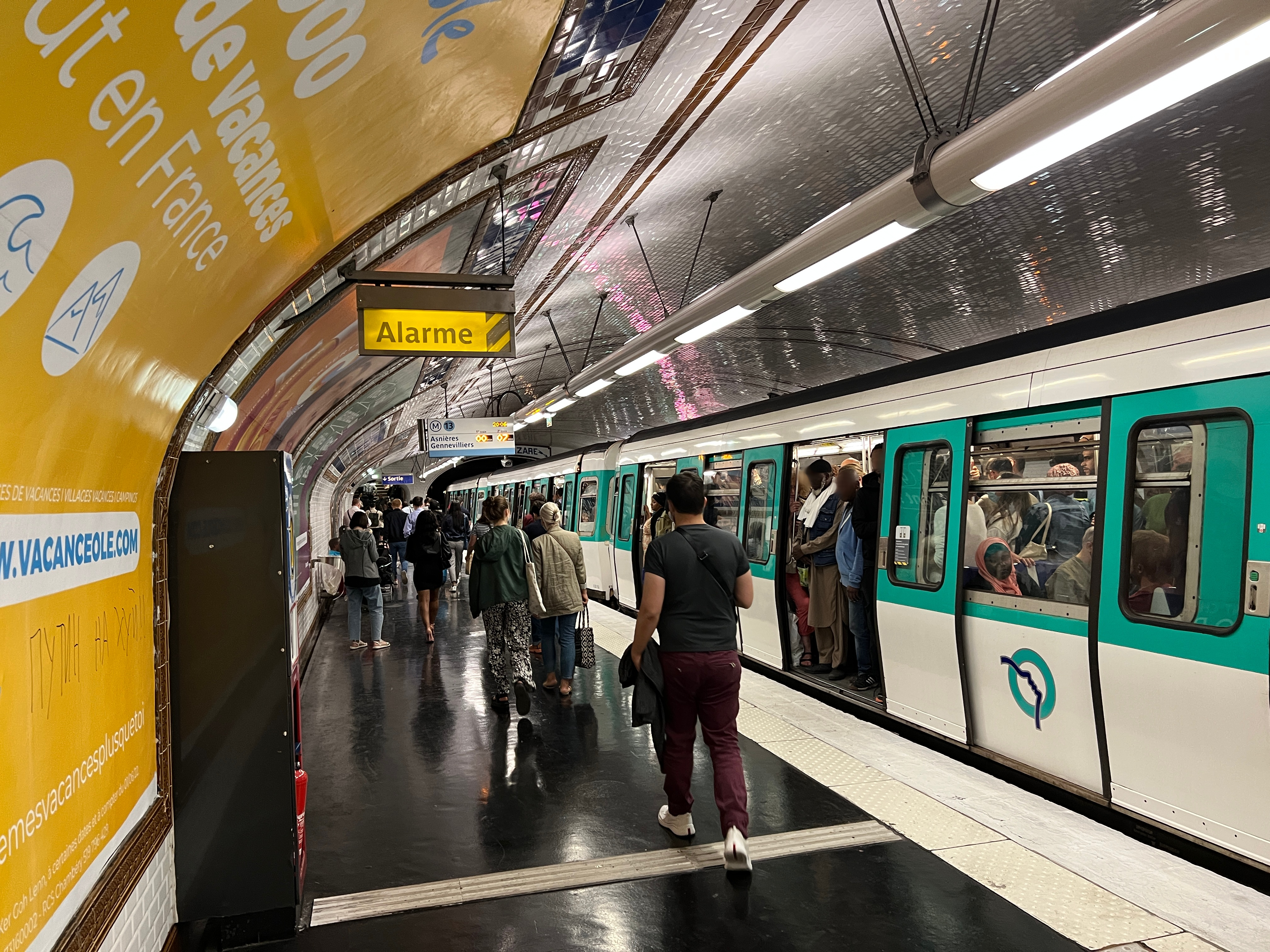
- View of the station's platforms

General information
- Location: 17th arrondissement of Paris; Île-de-France; France
- Coordinates: 48°53′27″N 2°19′11″E
- System: Paris Métro station
- Owner: RATP
- Operator: RATP
- Platforms: 2
- Tracks: 2

Other information
- Station code: 30-08
- Fare zone: 1

History
- Opened: 20 January 1912

Services
Preceding station	Paris Metro	Following station
La Fourche towards Châtillon–Montrouge	Line 13 Les Courtilles branch	Porte de Clichy towards Les Courtilles
Location
- Location within Paris

Brochant (French pronunciation: [bʁɔʃɑ̃]) is a station on Line 13 of the Paris Métro. Located in the 17th arrondissement, it is situated under the Avenue de Clichy at Rue Brochant, from which the station derives its name. It is part of the line's northwestern branch toward Les Courtilles, and is the only station of the line that has the Dir-on Porte de Clichy inscription at the north end of the station.

== Location ==
The station is located under Avenue de Clichy, north-west of the intersection of Rue Brochant. Oriented along a north-west/south-east axis and located on the branch towards Les Courtilles, it is positioned between the Porte de Clichy and La Fourche metro stations, the latter marking the beginning of a shared trunk line.

== History ==
The station opened 20 January 1912 with the inauguration of the second branch of Line B of the Nord-Sud Company from La Fourche to Porte de Clichy. On 27 March 1931, line B became line 13 following the absorption of the Nord-Sud Company on 1 January 1930 by its competitor, the Compagnie du chemin de fer métropolitain de Paris (known as the CMP). The street is named after André-Jean-François-Marie Brochant de Villiers, a French mineralogist and geologist who was responsible for the preparation of geological map of France.

From the 1950s until 2008, the walls were covered with metallic panels with green horizontal uprights and illuminated golden advertising frames. This arrangement was completed with characteristic shell seats in the Motte style, in green.

As part of the RATP Renouveau du métro program, the station corridors were renovated on 19 April 2002, then the platforms in 2009, resulting in the removal of their metal panels in favor of a return to the original Nord-Sud decoration.

In 2019, 2,984,525 travelers entered this station, which places it in 176th position among metro stations for its use.

== Passenger services ==
=== Access ===
The station has two accesses opening on either side of the end of Rue Brochant, each consisting of a fixed staircase adorned with a balustrade in the characteristic North-South style:

- Entrance 1 - Rue Brochant - Marché des Batignolles - located on the corner of 32 Rue Brochant and 127 Avenue de Clichy;
- Entrance 2 - Avenue de Clichy - corner of 47 Rue Brochant and 129 Avenue de Clichy.

=== Station layout ===
Street Level

Mezzanine

B2	Side platform, doors will open on the right
B2	Northbound	← toward Les Courtilles (Porte de Clichy)
B2	Southbound	toward Châtillon – Montrouge (La Fourche) →
B2	Side platform, doors will open on the right

=== Platform ===
Brochant is a standard configuration station with two platforms separated by the metro tracks under a semi-elliptical vault, a shape specific to the old Nord-Sud stations. The white tiles and ceramics repeat the original decoration, the advertising frames and the surrounds of the station name are brown in colour. Brown geometric designs are on the walls and the vault, the station name inscribed in white earthenware on a blue background of a small size above the advertising frames and of a very large size between these frames, The directions of lines are incorporated in the ceramic on the tunnels entrances. The bevelled white earthenware tiles cover the walls, the vault and the tunnel exits. The lighting is provided by two canopy strips and the seats are in the Akiko style, burgundy in colour.

=== Bus connections ===
The station is served by lines 31, 54, 66, 74, 163 and 518 (Traverse Batignolles-Bichat) of the RATP Bus Network and, at night, by lines N15 and N51 of the Noctilien network.

== Nearby ==
- Cité des Fleurs
- Église Saint-Joseph-des-Épinettes
- Parc Clichy-Batignolles – Martin-Luther-King

== Gallery ==
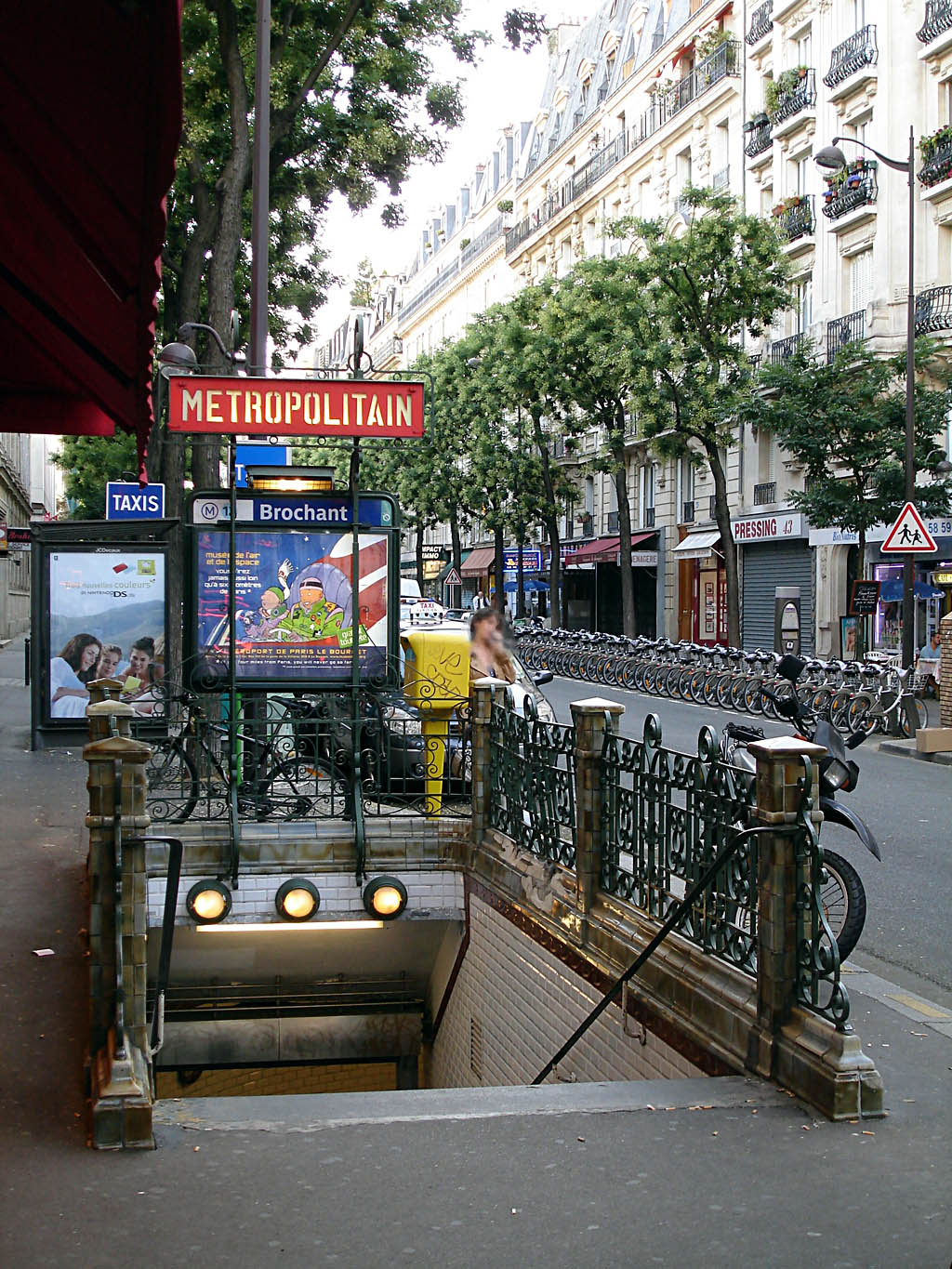
Street-level entrance at Brochant

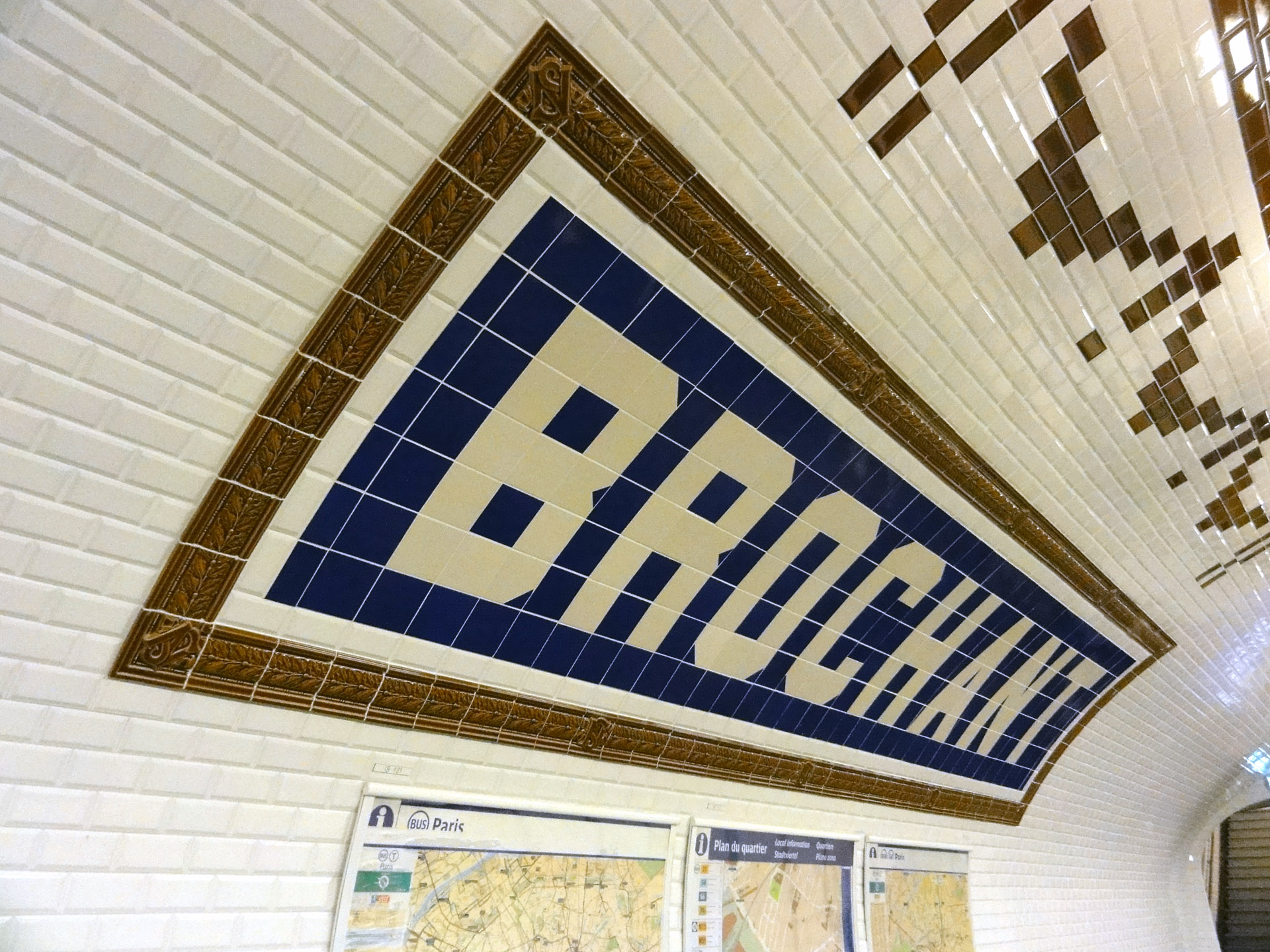
Station sign

== See also ==
- List of stations of the Paris Métro
