= Mairie de Clichy station =

Metro station in Paris, France

Mairie de Clichy
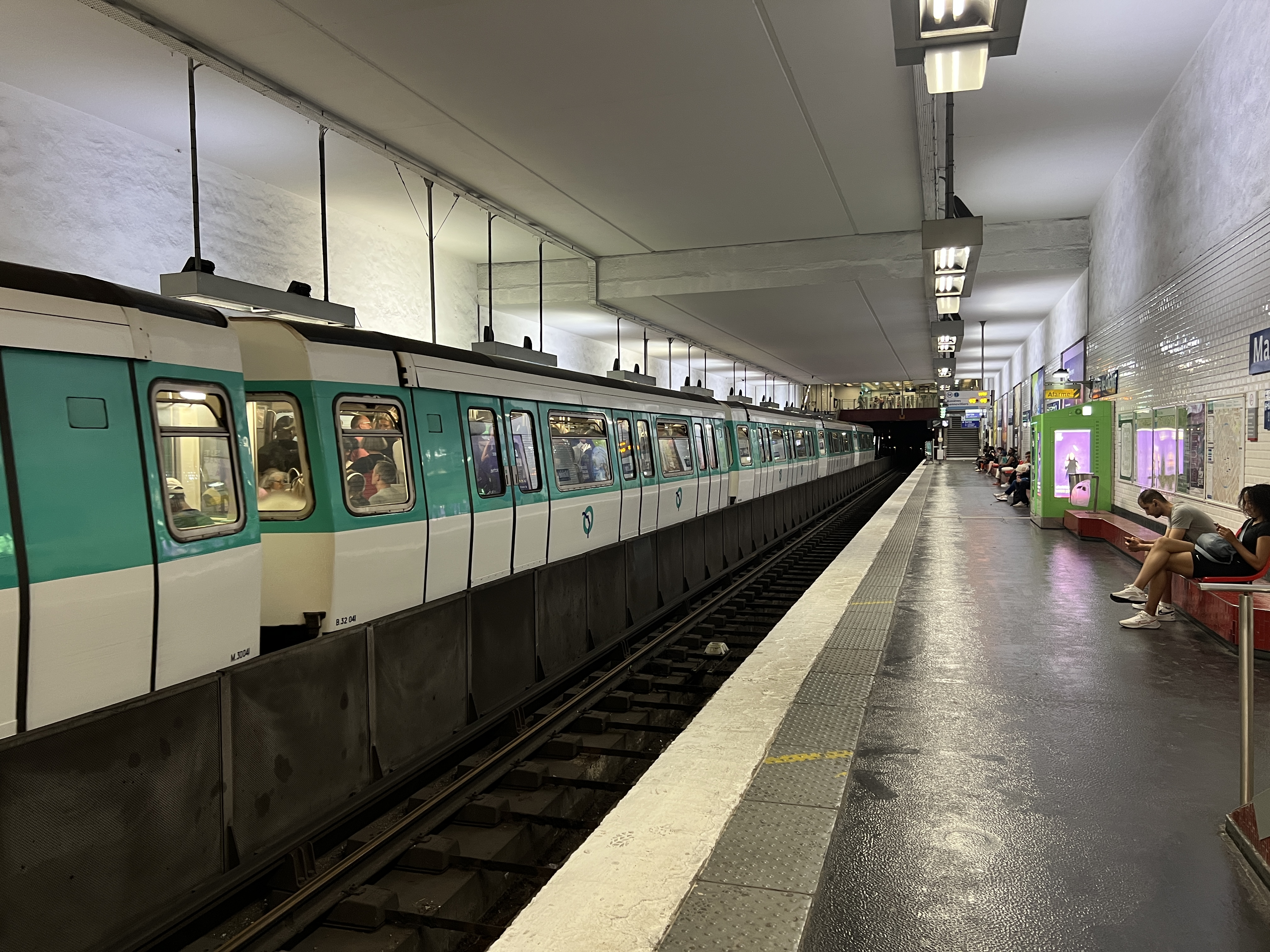
- View of the platforms

General information
- Location: Clichy; Île-de-France; France
- Coordinates: 48°54′11″N 2°18′22″E
- System: Paris Métro station
- Owner: RATP
- Operator: RATP
- Platforms: 2
- Tracks: 2

Other information
- Station code: 19-01
- Fare zone: 2

History
- Opened: 3 May 1980

Services
Preceding station	Paris Metro	Following station
Porte de Clichy towards Châtillon–Montrouge	Line 13 Les Courtilles branch	Gabriel Péri towards Les Courtilles
Location
- Location within Paris and inner ring

Mairie de Clichy (French pronunciation: [mɛʁi d(ə) kliʃi]) is a station on Line 13 of the Paris Métro. Located on the line's northwestern branch, it is situated under Rue Matre in the commune of Clichy, Hauts-de-Seine.

== History ==
The station opened on 3 May 1980 upon completion of the extension of Line 13 from Porte de Clichy to Gabriel Péri. Its name refers to the town hall of Clichy. In 2017, it was used by 7,107,063 passengers, making it the network's 42nd busiest station out of 302.

It has the particularity of being very far from the surrounding stations, approximately 1,250 meters separate it from the previous station, Porte de Clichy, and 1,600 meters from the next metro station, Gabriel Péri. This choice was made because, during the studies, nearly 90% of the city's population lived less than 800 meters from the station, and because it was particularly difficult to create a station at the outlet of the Pont de Clichy, in a complex interchange and at the point where the line passes by viaduct.

In 2019, according to RATP estimates, 6,342,058 travelers entered this station, which places it in 51st position among metro stations for its use out of 302.

== Passenger services ==
=== Access ===
The station has two entrances to Rue Martre, one in front of the administrative center, the other inserted in a lower building on the other side of the street.

=== Station layout ===
Street Level

Mezzanine

B2	Side platform, doors will open on the right
B2	Northbound	← toward Les Courtilles (Gabriel Péri)
B2	Southbound	toward Châtillon – Montrouge (Porte de Clichy) →
B2	Side platform, doors will open on the right

=== Platforms ===
Mairie de Clichy is a standard configuration station with two platforms separated by metro tracks.

=== Bus connections ===
The station is served by lines 54, 174, 274, 341 and the TUC urban service of the RATP Bus Network and, at night, by lines N15 and N51 of the Noctilien network.
