= Les Courtilles station =

Metro station in Paris, France

Asnières–Gennevilliers Les Courtilles
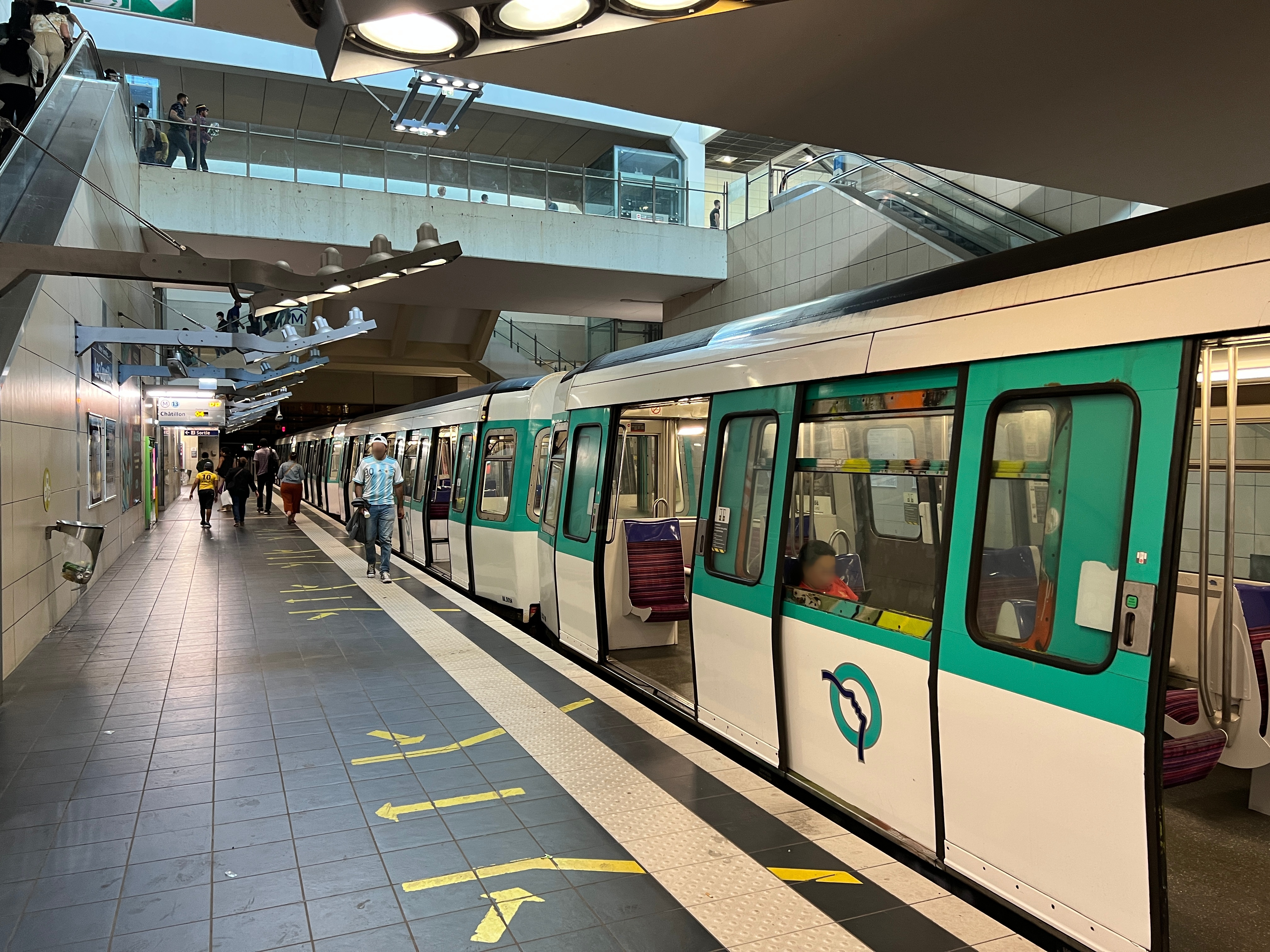

General information
- Location: Asnières-sur-Seine and Gennevilliers, Hauts-de-Seine; Île-de-France; France
- Coordinates: 48°55′50″N 2°17′02″E
- System: Paris Métro station
- Owner: RATP
- Operator: RATP
- Line: Line 13
- Platforms: 2
- Tracks: 2

Construction
- Accessible: yes

Other information
- Station code: 19-04
- Fare zone: 3

History
- Opened: 14 June 2008

Services
Preceding station	Paris Metro	Following station
Les Agnettes towards Châtillon–Montrouge	Line 13 Les Courtilles branch	Terminus
Preceding station	Tram	Following station
Asnières–Quatre Routes Terminus	T1	Le Luth towards Noisy-le-Sec
Location
- Location within Paris and inner ring

Les Courtilles (French pronunciation: [le kuʁtij]) is the terminus of the northwestern branch of Line 13 of the Paris Métro.

== Location ==
The station is located on the border of the municipalities of communes of Asnières-sur-Seine and Gennevilliers, at the intersection formed by the axis of the Avenue de la Redoute and Avenue Lucien-Lanternier on the one hand, and the axis Boulevard Pierre-de-Coubertin and Boulevard Intercommunal on the other hand. The name of each of these two towns can be found above the name of the station on the maps and in the station.

== History ==
The station opened on 14 June 2008 upon completion of the extension of Line 13 from Gabriel Péri. Reversing sidings are provided to the north of the station for trains to change direction. In November 2012, Île-de-France tramway Line 1 was extended to the west to terminate at Les Courtilles.

In 2020, with the Covid-19 crisis, 2,194,218 passengers entered this station, which places it in 109th position among metro stations for its attendance.

A later extension of line 13 to Port de Gennevilliers, included in the Schéma directeur de la région Île-de-France (SDRIF) master plan and adopted in 2008 by the Regional Council of Île-de-France, is no longer envisaged. This project no longer appears in the new version of the SDRIF adopted on 25 October 2012.

== Passenger services ==
As with all new metro stations built since 1992, the station is fully accessible.

=== Station layout ===
Street Level

Mezzanine

B2	Side platform, doors will open on the right
B2	Northbound	← Alighting passengers only (toward depot)
B2	Southbound	toward Châtillon–Montrouge (Les Agnettes) →
B2	Side platform, doors will open on the right

=== Platforms ===
Les Courtilles is a standard configuration station with two platforms separated by metro tracks.

=== Other connections ===
The station is served by the T1 tramway (since 15 November 2012), lines 235, 238, 276, 304, 378 and Bus du Port of the RATP Bus Network, and at night, by the Noctilien line N51.

== Nearby ==
- Port of Gennevilliers
- Stade Léo-Lagrange, in Asnières-sur-Seine

== Gallery ==
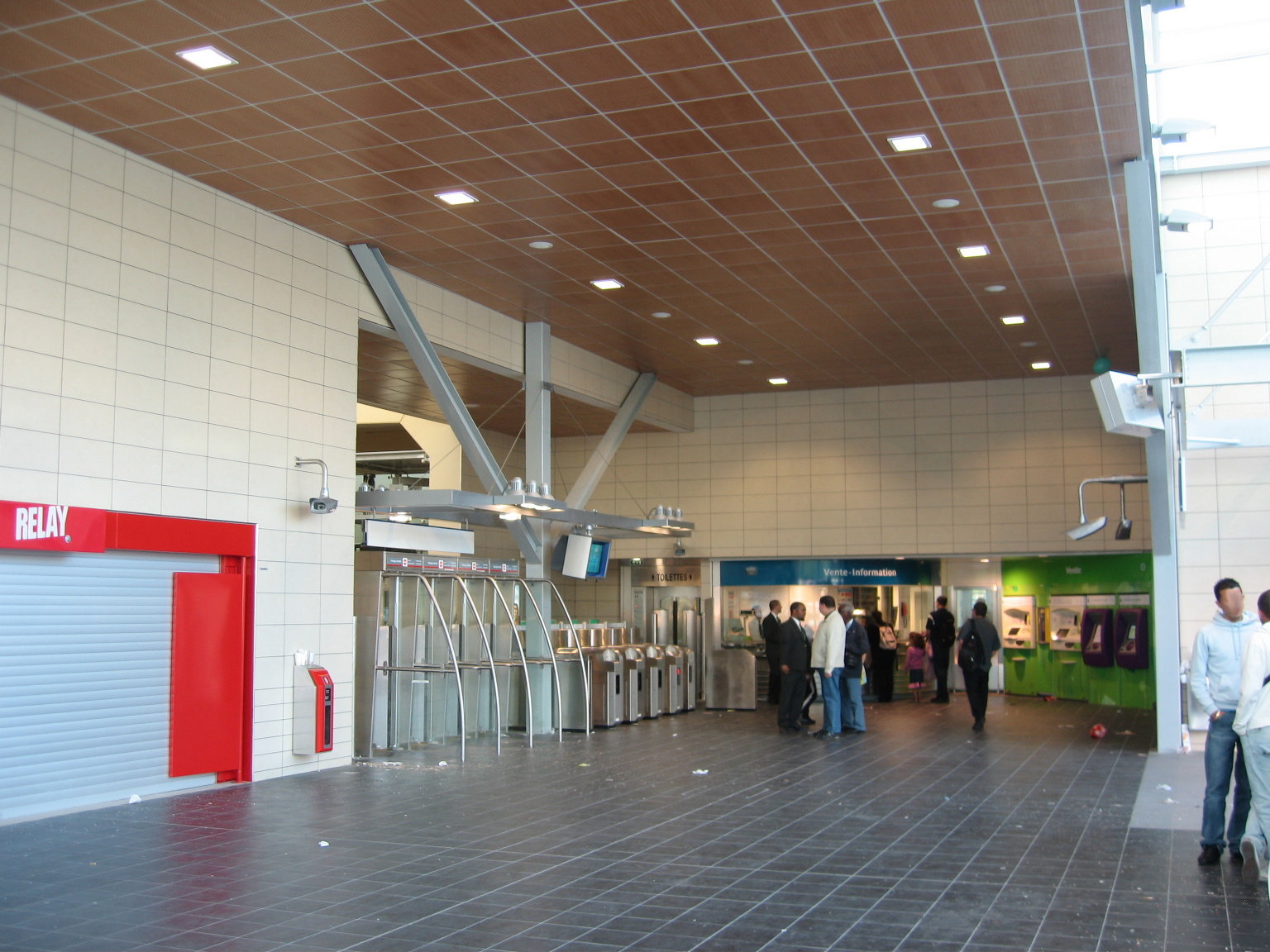
Les Courtilles ticket hall

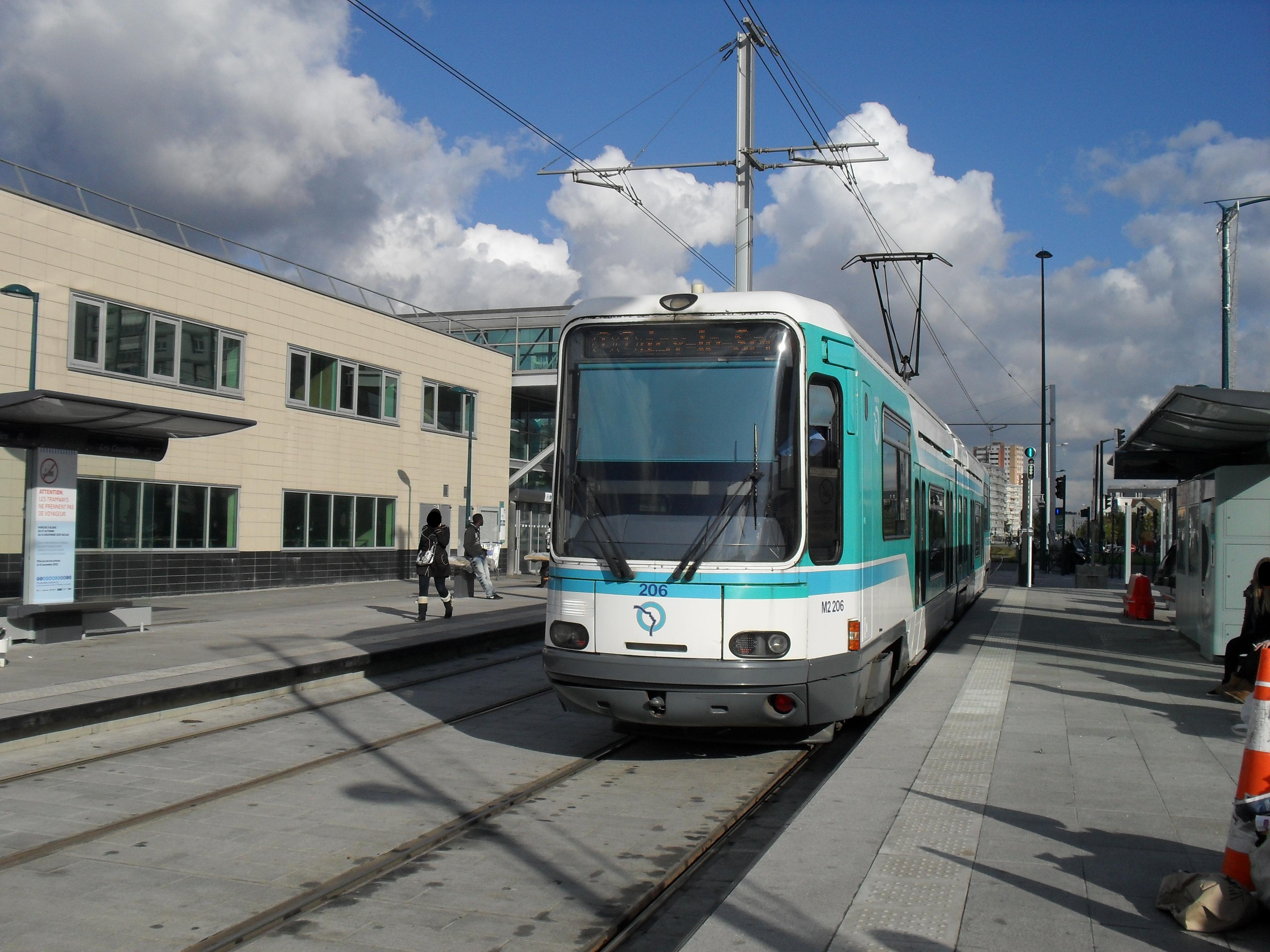
Tram stop outside the station

== See also ==
- List of stations of the Paris Métro
