= Bonneuil-en-France =

- Commune
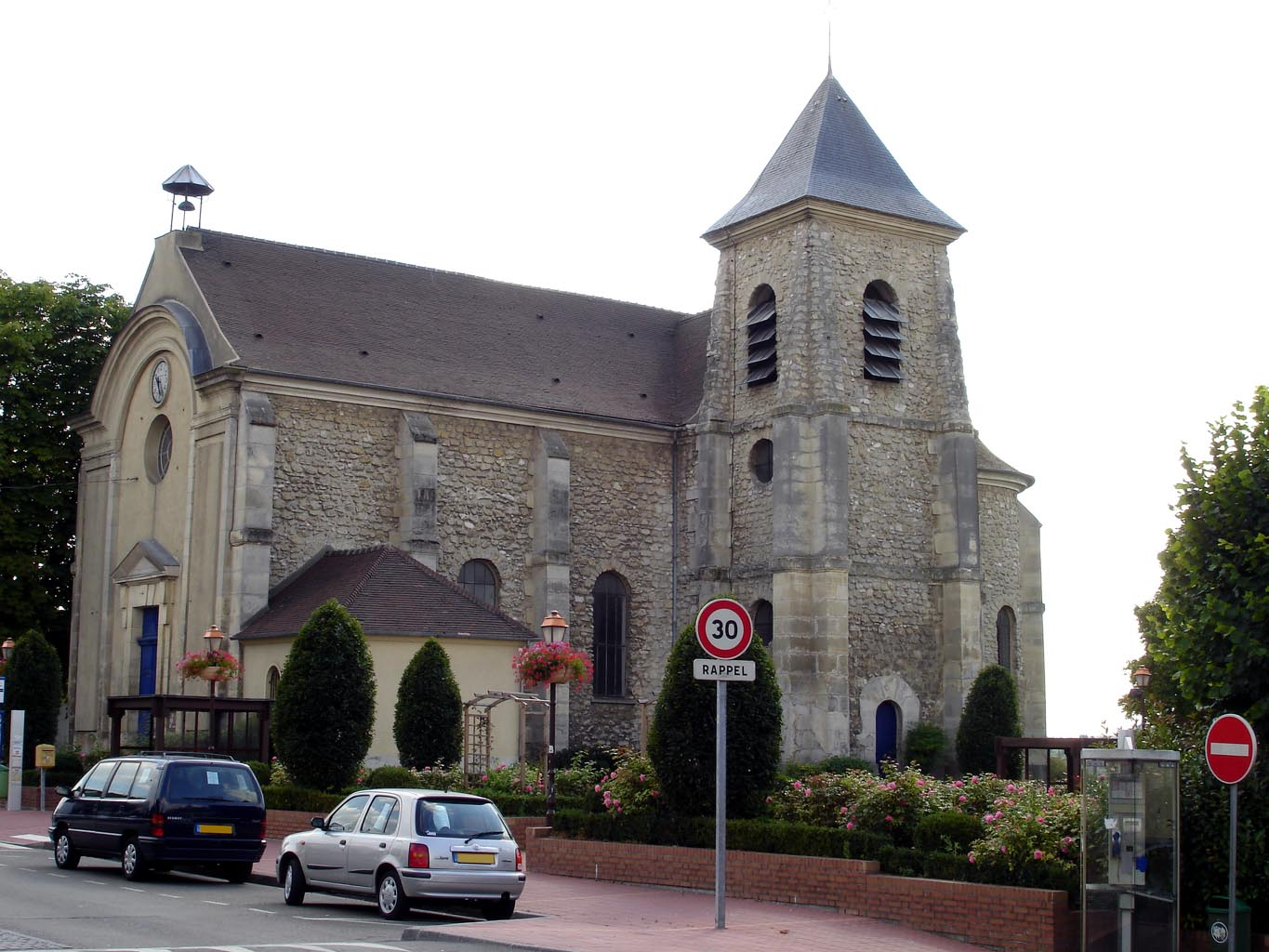
- Saint Martin
- Location of Bonneuil-en-France
- Location within France Location within Île-de-France (region)
- Coordinates: 48°58′31″N 2°26′39″E
- Country: France
- Region: Île-de-France
- Department: Val-d'Oise
- Arrondissement: Sarcelles
- Canton: Villiers-le-Bel
- Intercommunality: CA Roissy Pays de France

Government
  - Mayor (2020–2026): Abdellah Benouaret
- Area^{1}: 4.71 km^{2} (1.82 sq mi)
- Population (2023): 1,185
  - Density: 252/km^{2} (652/sq mi)
- Time zone: UTC+01:00 (CET)
  - Summer (DST): UTC+02:00 (CEST)
- INSEE/Postal code: 95088 /95500
- ^{1} French Land Register data, which excludes lakes, ponds, glaciers > 1 km^{2} (0.386 sq mi or 247 acres) and river estuaries.

Bonneuil-en-France (French pronunciation: [bɔnœj ɑ̃ fʁɑ̃s], lit. 'Bonneuil in France') is a commune in the Val-d'Oise department in Île-de-France in northern France.

Le Bourget Airport is partially located in the commune.

== Geography ==
Bonneuil-en-France is located in the Pays de France, a natural region from which she takes the name.

=== Climate ===
Bonneuil-en-France has an oceanic climate (Köppen climate classification Cfb). The average annual temperature in Bonneuil-en-France is 12.1 °C (53.8 °F). The average annual rainfall is 616.3 mm (24.26 in) with December as the wettest month. The temperatures are highest on average in July, at around 20.2 °C (68.4 °F), and lowest in January, at around 4.9 °C (40.8 °F). The highest temperature ever recorded in Bonneuil-en-France was 42.1 °C (107.8 °F) on 25 July 2019; the coldest temperature ever recorded was −18.2 °C (−0.8 °F) on 17 January 1985.

Comparison of local Meteorological data with other cities in France
| Town | Sunshine (hours/yr) | Rain (mm/yr) | Snow (days/yr) | Storm (days/yr) | Fog (days/yr) |
|---|---|---|---|---|---|
| National average | 1,973 | 770 | 14 | 22 | 40 |
| Bonneuil-en-France | 1,689.2 | 639.4 | 13.3 | 22.7 | 24.2 |
| Paris | 1,661 | 637 | 12 | 18 | 10 |
| Nice | 2,724 | 767 | 1 | 29 | 1 |
| Strasbourg | 1,693 | 665 | 29 | 29 | 56 |
| Brest | 1,605 | 1,211 | 7 | 12 | 75 |

Climate data for Bonneuil-en-France (Le Bourget, altitude 49m, 1991–2020 normals, extremes 1920–present)
| Month | Jan | Feb | Mar | Apr | May | Jun | Jul | Aug | Sep | Oct | Nov | Dec | Year |
|---|---|---|---|---|---|---|---|---|---|---|---|---|---|
| Record high °C (°F) | 16.1 (61.0) | 20.8 (69.4) | 25.5 (77.9) | 31.9 (89.4) | 35.0 (95.0) | 36.9 (98.4) | 42.1 (107.8) | 40.2 (104.4) | 35.0 (95.0) | 29.4 (84.9) | 21.3 (70.3) | 17.2 (63.0) | 42.1 (107.8) |
| Mean daily maximum °C (°F) | 7.5 (45.5) | 8.7 (47.7) | 12.6 (54.7) | 16.1 (61.0) | 19.6 (67.3) | 23.0 (73.4) | 25.5 (77.9) | 25.4 (77.7) | 21.5 (70.7) | 16.5 (61.7) | 11.1 (52.0) | 7.9 (46.2) | 16.3 (61.3) |
| Daily mean °C (°F) | 4.9 (40.8) | 5.4 (41.7) | 8.4 (47.1) | 11.2 (52.2) | 14.7 (58.5) | 18.0 (64.4) | 20.2 (68.4) | 20.0 (68.0) | 16.5 (61.7) | 12.7 (54.9) | 8.1 (46.6) | 5.4 (41.7) | 12.1 (53.8) |
| Mean daily minimum °C (°F) | 2.3 (36.1) | 2.1 (35.8) | 4.2 (39.6) | 6.3 (43.3) | 9.8 (49.6) | 13.0 (55.4) | 14.9 (58.8) | 14.6 (58.3) | 11.5 (52.7) | 8.8 (47.8) | 5.2 (41.4) | 2.8 (37.0) | 8.0 (46.4) |
| Record low °C (°F) | −18.2 (−0.8) | −16.8 (1.8) | −9.6 (14.7) | −3.7 (25.3) | −1.6 (29.1) | 0.9 (33.6) | 3.5 (38.3) | 1.9 (35.4) | 0.1 (32.2) | −5.6 (21.9) | −9.5 (14.9) | −15.1 (4.8) | −18.2 (−0.8) |
| Average precipitation mm (inches) | 46.8 (1.84) | 41.1 (1.62) | 43.9 (1.73) | 43.1 (1.70) | 60.5 (2.38) | 53.8 (2.12) | 56.3 (2.22) | 52.5 (2.07) | 44.6 (1.76) | 56.7 (2.23) | 53.6 (2.11) | 63.4 (2.50) | 616.3 (24.26) |
| Average precipitation days (≥ 1.0 mm) | 10.3 | 9.1 | 9.4 | 8.7 | 9.3 | 8.4 | 7.4 | 7.9 | 8.0 | 9.7 | 10.2 | 11.7 | 110.1 |
| Mean monthly sunshine hours | 57.4 | 73.7 | 129.3 | 171.0 | 189.4 | 203.0 | 213.2 | 206.4 | 161.6 | 111.3 | 63.7 | 54.3 | 1,634.2 |
Source: Météo-France

== Urbanism ==
=== Typology ===
Bonneuil-en-France is an urban commune, as it is one of the dense or intermediate density communes, as defined by the Insee communal density grid. (Note: According to the zoning of rural and urban municipalities published in November 2020, in application of the new definition of rurality validated on November 14, 2020 by the Interministerial Committee for Rural Areas.) It belongs to the urban unit of Paris, an inter-departmental conurbation comprising 407 communes and 10,785,092 inhabitants in 2017, of which it is a suburban commune.

The commune is also part of the functional area of Paris (Note: In October 2020, the concept of functional area replaced that of urban area in order to enable consistent comparisons with other European Union countries) where it is located in the main population and employment centre of the functional area. This area comprises 1,929 communes.

=== Urban morphology ===
Strictly speaking, the commune does not have any neighbourhoods, but there are two distinct residential areas separated by Paris–Le Bourget Airport. The first, to the north, is Bonneuil-en-France town centre and the second, to the south, near the RD 317, is the Pont-Yblon housing estate.

=== Land use ===
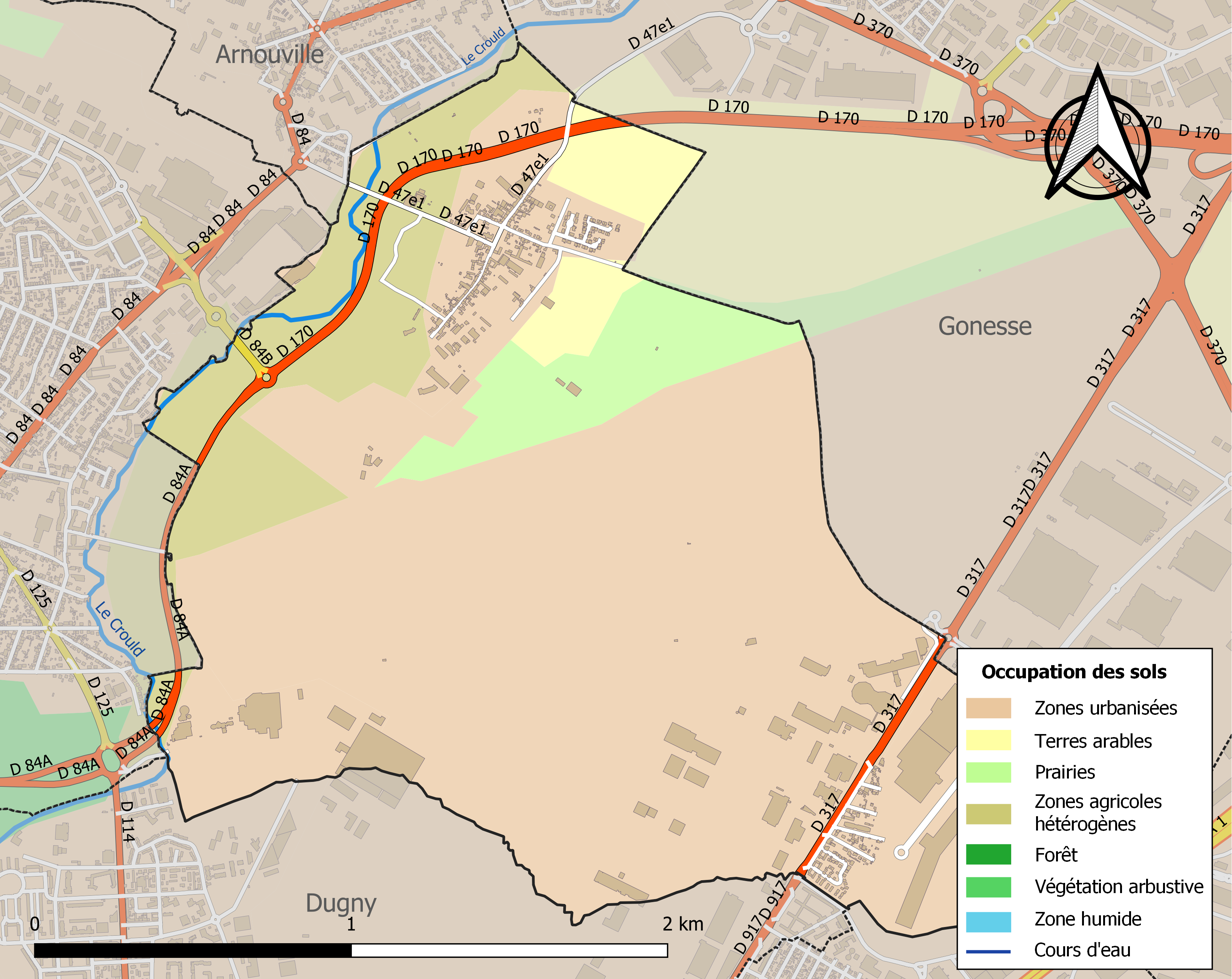
Land use map

Land use in Bonneuil-en-France in 2008
| Type of land use | Percentage | Area (In hectares) | Area (In acres) |
|---|---|---|---|
| Built-up urban space | 43.5 % | 206.36 | 509.93 |
| Unbuilt urban space | 6.5 % | 30.68 | 75.81 |
| Rural areas | 50.1 % | 237.61 | 587.15 |
Source: Institut d'aménagement et d'urbanisme de la région d'Île-de-France (Iaurif)

In 2008, Bonneuil-en-France had a total surface area of 474.64 hectares (1,172.9 acres). Its 474.64 hectares (1,172.9 acres) is sparsely divided between individual and collective housing, which covers 6.56 hectares (16.2 acres) and 2.17 hectares (5.4 acres) respectively. They are also covered by transport routes (streets, railways, etc.) with 99.80 hectares (246.6 acres), by businesses (including offices, shops, etc.) with 47.39 hectares (117.1 acres) and by building sites with 47.44 hectares (117.2 acres). Green spaces cover 19.56 hectares (48.3 acres) of the municipality, i.e. almost 41% of its territory, and crops cover 42.61 hectares (105.3 acres), almost 9% of its territory. Open sports facilities cover 2.73 hectares (6.7 acres) and other facilities (leisure and cultural, health, educational, etc.) occupy 0.52 hectares (1.3 acres) of the town.

=== Development projects ===
At the beginning of 2010, three architects were commissioned to develop the Paris Le Bourget area, with the office of the Secretary of State for the Capital Region, Christian Blanc, stating that the area was considered to be one of the flagship projects of the Grand Paris project. The project will be managed by the Le Bourget airport conurbation community, which includes the communes of Le Bourget, Drancy and Dugny, in association with the towns of Le Blanc-Mesnil and Bonneuil-en-France. Around 60% of Paris-Le Bourget Airport is in the Val-d'Oise, and a very large part of it is in Bonneuil-en-France, so the municipality is very much affected by this project, especially as it has available land.

== Population and society ==
=== Demographics ===
Historical population

| Year | Pop. | ±% p.a. |
|---|---|---|
| 1793 | 516 | — |
| 1821 | 405 | −0.86% |
| 1846 | 416 | +0.11% |
| 1872 | 333 | −0.85% |
| 1901 | 337 | +0.04% |
| 1926 | 541 | +1.91% |
| 1946 | 326 | −2.50% |
| 1962 | 654 | +4.45% |
| 1968 | 597 | −1.51% |

| Year | Pop. | ±% p.a. |
|---|---|---|
| 1975 | 561 | −0.88% |
| 1982 | 529 | −0.84% |
| 1990 | 707 | +3.69% |
| 1999 | 774 | +1.01% |
| 2007 | 711 | −1.06% |
| 2012 | 723 | +0.34% |
| 2017 | 1,076 | +8.28% |
| 2023 | 1,185 | +1.62% |

Source: EHESS and INSEE (1968-2023)

=== Education and youth ===
The commune has one combined preschool (école maternelle) and elementary school. As of 2016 it has 82 students. Junior high school students in the commune attend Collège Jean Moulin in Arnouville-lès-Gonesse. The area senior high school is Lycée René Cassin in Gonesse.

=== Sports ===
Bonneuil-en-France has an outdoor sports complex with a multi-sports pitch, table tennis and a children's play area.

Within the municipality, it's possible to play football.

=== Worship ===
There is a Catholic place of worship in the church of Saint-Martin. It is part of the diocese of Pontoise.

There are several Protestant, Jewish and Muslim places of worship in the neighbouring towns of Garges-lès-Gonesse, Gonesse and Blanc-Mesnil.

== See also ==
- Communes of the Val-d'Oise department
