= Le Blanc-Mesnil =

- Commune
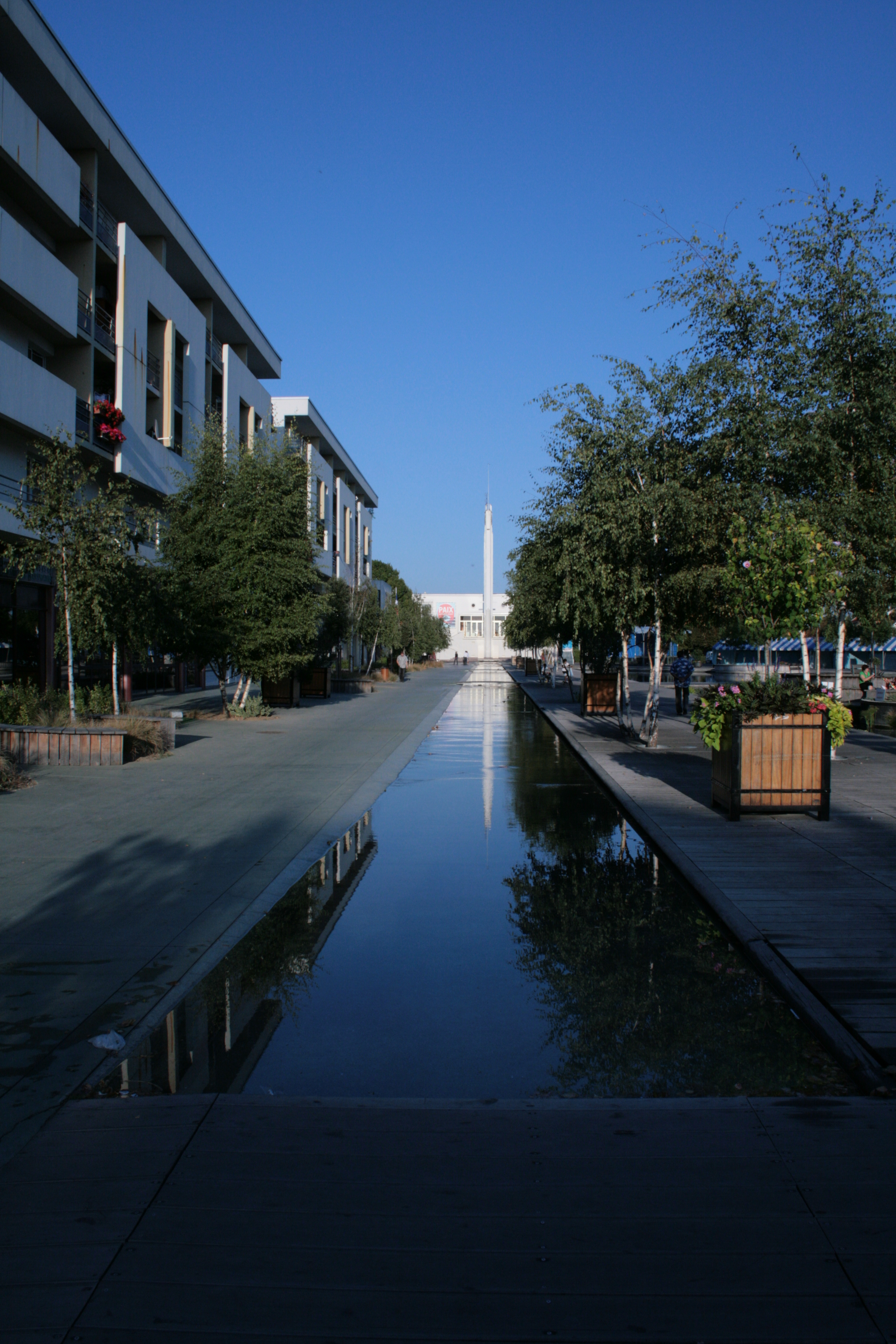
- The view towards the Hôtel de Ville

- Coat of arms

- Location (in red) within Paris inner suburbs
- Location of Le Blanc-Mesnil
- Location within France Location within Île-de-France (region)
- Coordinates: 48°56′19″N 2°27′41″E
- Country: France
- Region: Île-de-France
- Department: Seine-Saint-Denis
- Arrondissement: Le Raincy
- Canton: Le Blanc-Mesnil
- Intercommunality: Grand Paris

Government
  - Mayor (2026–32): Demba Traoré
- Area^{1}: 8.05 km^{2} (3.11 sq mi)
- Highest elevation: 47 m (154 ft)
- Lowest elevation: 37 m (121 ft)
- Population (2023): 62,376
  - Density: 7,750/km^{2} (20,100/sq mi)
- Time zone: UTC+01:00 (CET)
  - Summer (DST): UTC+02:00 (CEST)
- INSEE/Postal code: 93007 /93150
- ^{1} French Land Register data, which excludes lakes, ponds, glaciers > 1 km^{2} (0.386 sq mi or 247 acres) and river estuaries.

Le Blanc-Mesnil (French pronunciation: [lə blɑ̃ menil]) is a commune in the northeastern suburbs of Paris, France. It is located 12.6 km (7.8 mi) from the center of Paris, between Charles de Gaulle Airport and Le Bourget Airport.

== Name ==
The name Le Blanc-Mesnil was recorded for the first time in the 11th century as Mansionile Blaun. This name is a compound of Medieval Latin Mansionile, meaning 'little houses', from Latin mansio (accusative mansionem), and of Germanic (Old Frankish) blanch, blaun, meaning 'glossy, shining, white', which gave French blanc ('white') and English blank.

The name is interpreted by some as a reference to the houses of Le Blanc-Mesnil which were whitened due to the flour dust coming from the windmills located there in ancient times. One researcher, however, thinks that blanc had also the meaning of 'free' in Old French, and so the name would mean 'free mesnil, free village', perhaps because the villagers had been freed from serfdom. None of these interpretations is certain.

== Geography ==
=== Nearest municipalities ===
- Bondy
- Aulnay-sous-Bois
- Drancy
- Le Bourget
- Dugny
- Bonneuil-en-France in Val d'Oise and Gonesse.

== History ==
=== Prehistory and Antiquity ===
A discovery in 1984 concerning archeological excavation found three polished axes and modified flint attests a human presence in Le Blanc-Mesnil in the Neolithic period and the Gallo-Roman era. Shards of gallic ceramic were found.

The Morée and Molette rivers nearby and the existence of an ancient Roman road support this theory.

=== French Revolution ===
On 2 December 1792, a third of the territory of Aulnay was detached and became the commune of Le Blanc-Mesnil. The current Hôtel de Ville (town hall) was completed in 1967.

=== Heraldry ===
Arms of Le Blanc-Mesnil	The arms of Le Blanc-Mesnil are blazoned : Azure, a cross engrailed Or, a canton chequy argent and azure, in 2nd and 3rd a hand appaumy, in 4th a drageoir (sweetsdish) Or

== Economy ==
- Parc d'activité du Coudray
- Zone industrielle de la Molette in Blanc-Mesnil, Bourget and Drancy. It includes Centre Albert Einstein, created in 1987.
- Parc Modus
- Garonor
- Pont-Yblon
- Centre d'affaires international Paris Nord II
- Carré des Aviateurs
- Espace Descartes, for tourism business. Three hotels three stars, a Novotel hotel.

=== French and international companies ===
Several French companies have their world headquarters in Blanc-Mesnil, such as Forclum and Sicli.

== Population ==
Historical population

Year	Pop.	±% p.a.
1793	120	—
1821	81	−1.39%
1846	128	+1.85%
1872	128	+0.00%
1891	165	+1.35%
1901	213	+2.59%
1906	978	+35.64%
1911	1,770	+12.60%
1921	3,932	+8.31%
1926	10,688	+22.14%
1931	19,343	+12.60%
1936	21,660	+2.29%

Year	Pop.	±% p.a.
1946	18,277	−1.68%
1954	25,363	+4.18%
1962	35,708	+4.37%
1968	48,487	+5.23%
1975	49,107	+0.18%
1982	47,037	−0.61%
1990	46,956	−0.02%
1999	46,936	−0.00%
2007	50,910	+1.02%
2012	52,213	+0.51%
2017	56,783	+1.69%
2023	62,376	+1.58%

Source: EHESS and INSEE (1968-2023)

=== Immigration ===
Place of birth of residents of Le Blanc-Mesnil in 1999
Born in metropolitan France	Born outside metropolitan France			
72.5%	27.5%			
72.5%	Born in overseas France	Born in foreign countries with French citizenship at birth^{1}	EU-15 immigrants^{2}	Non-EU-15 immigrants
72.5%	3.9%	2.7%	5.5%	15.4%
^{1} This group is made up largely of former French settlers, such as pieds-noirs in Northwest Africa, followed by former colonial citizens who had French citizenship at birth (such as was often the case for the native elite in French colonies), as well as to a lesser extent foreign-born children of French expatriates. A foreign country is understood as a country not part of France in 1999, so a person born for example in 1950 in Algeria, when Algeria was an integral part of France, is nonetheless listed as a person born in a foreign country in French statistics.^{2} An immigrant is a person born in a foreign country not having French citizenship at birth. An immigrant may have acquired French citizenship since moving to France, but is still considered an immigrant in French statistics. On the other hand, persons born in France with foreign citizenship (the children of immigrants) are not listed as immigrants.

== Administration ==
=== Political life ===
The following political parties have a permanent base in Blanc-Mesnil:

- Parti Communiste Français
- Parti Socialiste
- Union for French Democracy (UDF)
- Union for a Popular Movement (UMP)
- Groupe des Verts

=== Mayors ===
Since Libération: Demba Traoré, since 2026.; Jean-Philippe Ranquet, LR, 2021-2026.; Thierry Meignen, LR, 2014-2021.; Didier Mignot, PC, 2008-2014.; Daniel Feurtet, PC, 1989-2008.; Robert Fregossy, PC, 1965-1989.; Eugène le Moign, PC, 1945-1965.	Between 1860 and 1945: Maurice Lambot, 1943–1945; Alfred Dubuissez, 1941–1943; Bernard Legrand, 1939–1941; Henri Duquenne, PC, 1935–1939; Marcel Gerdil, SFIO, 1929–1935; André Neufinck, 1908–1929; Pierre-Hippolyte Jouslain, 1905–1908; Marcel-Edouard Renault, 1892–1905; Michel Renault, 1860-1892

== Transport ==
Le Blanc-Mesnil is served by Le Blanc-Mesnil station on Paris RER line B.

Le Blanc-Mesnil is also served by Drancy station on Paris RER line B. This station (formerly called Blanc-Mesnil-Drancy), although administratively located on the territory of the neighboring commune of Drancy, is the closest from the town center of Le Blanc-Mesnil and is thus used by people in Le Blanc-Mesnil.

The bus company provides 17 lines of buses to travel within the city.

Ideally placed at the junction between the A1 and the A3.

2.5 km (1.6 mi) from Le Bourget airport, 7 km (4.3 mi) from Charles de Gaulle Airport and 4.5 km (2.8 mi) from Parc des Expositions de Villepinte, one can easily get to Parc Astérix and Disneyland as well as the centre of Paris and the Stade de France.

=== Religion ===
Catholic churches: Église Notre-Dame, Église Saint-Charles, Église Sainte-Thérèse. Evangelic churches: Charisma Église Chrétienne

== Education ==
The commune has the following schools: four preschools in the south, seven preschools in the centre of town, and six preschools in the north. It has four elementary schools in the south, six elementary schools in the centre, and six elementary schools in the north.

Junior high schools:

- Collège Aimé et Eugénie Cotton
- Collège Descartes
- Collège Marcel Cachin
- Collège Nelson Mandela

Senior high schools:

- Lycée Jean Moulin
- Lycée professionnel Aristide Briand
- Lycée Wolfgang Amadeus Mozart

The Médiathèque Edouard Glissant/Bibliothèque Jacques Prévert serves as the municipal library.

== Environment ==
=== Parks and gardens ===
- Jacques-Duclos Park
- Vineyards produces Clos blanc-mesnilois, a Chardonnay
- Vegetal wall of Forum culturel by Patrick Blanc
- Place de l'eau
- Jardin de Montillet
- Square Stalingrad

=== Sports ===
Blanc-Mesnil Sports (BMS), founded in 2005, is the city's sport club.

== International relations ==
Le Blanc-Mesnil is twinned with:

- Beni Douala, Algeria
- Debre Berhan, Ethiopia
- Sandwell, West Midlands, United Kingdom

For fifteen years, twinning between le Blanc-Mesnil and Debre Berhan has been based on the development: water sanitation, education, construction of roads. In a rare spirit, that of a collaboration of equal to equal.

== Personalities ==
- Jérémy Abadie, footballer
- Adil Aouchiche, footballer
- Amara Baby, footballer
- Pierre-Edouard Bellemare, hockey player
- Jonathan Biabiany, footballer
- Jean-Felix Dorothee, footballer
- Abdou Doumbia, footballer
- Morgaro Gomis, footballer
- Raphaël Guerreiro, footballer
- Sylvie Guillem, star dancer at Paris Opera
- Patrick Hernandez, famous singer of Born to Be Alive
- Mickael Marolany, footballer
- Fabien Marsaud, known as Grand Corps Malade, slam poet
- Senny Mayulu, footballer
- Fabrice N'Sakala, footballer
- Moussa Sissoko, footballer
- Ludovic Sylvestre, footballer
- Tristan Valentin, road bicycle racer
- Élisabeth Vonarburg, writer of science-fiction

== See also ==
- Communes of the Seine-Saint-Denis department

== Bibliography ==
- Le Blanc-Mesnil et son passé, Ernest Soitel, 1969.
- Histoire anecdotique de Blanc-Mesnil, Albert Galicier, 1973.
- Le Blanc-Mesnil des temps modernes : 1935-1985, 1986.
- Le Blanc-Mesnil, Pierre Bourgeade, Gilles Smadja, Jean-Pierre Vallorani, Françoise Vasseur, 1992.
- Le Blanc-Mesnil : citoyens de demain, Patrick Laigre et Jocelyne Héquet, 1993.
- Le Blanc-Mesnil : 2000 regards, Photographies de Luc Choquer, François Crignon, Erwan Guillard, 1999.
- Le Blanc-Mesnil, Christian Massart, 2005.
- Twinning between Le Blanc-Mesnil and Debré-Berhan (in English and French).
