= Urban cluster (France) =

Type of statistical area in France

In France, a pôle urbain (English: urban cluster) is a statistical area defined by INSEE (France's national statistics office) for the measurement of contiguously built-up areas. It shares the same definition as an unité urbaine ("urban unit"), except that a pôle urbain is not contained within the couronne ("commuter belt") of any other; in other words, a pôle urbain is an urban area that is a core of demographic growth.

== See also ==
- urban area
- unité urbaine
- aire urbaine
