= Le Bourget =

- Commune
- The town hall of Le Bourget

- Coat of arms

- Location (in red) within Paris inner suburbs
- Location of Le Bourget
- Location within France Location within Île-de-France (region)
- Coordinates: 48°56′07″N 2°25′32″E
- Country: France
- Region: Île-de-France
- Department: Seine-Saint-Denis
- Arrondissement: Le Raincy
- Canton: La Courneuve
- Intercommunality: Grand Paris

Government
  - Mayor (2026–32): Mehdi Nezzar
- Area^{1}: 2.08 km^{2} (0.80 sq mi)
- Highest elevation: 48 m (157 ft)
- Lowest elevation: 38 m (125 ft)
- Population (2023): 15,925
  - Density: 7,660/km^{2} (19,800/sq mi)
- Time zone: UTC+01:00 (CET)
  - Summer (DST): UTC+02:00 (CEST)
- INSEE/Postal code: 93013 /3293350
- Website: www.le-bourget.fr
- ^{1} French Land Register data, which excludes lakes, ponds, glaciers > 1 km^{2} (0.386 sq mi or 247 acres) and river estuaries.

Le Bourget (French pronunciation: [lə buʁˈʒɛ]) is a commune in the northeastern suburbs of Paris, France. It is located 10.6 km (6 9/16 mi) from the center of Paris.

The commune features Le Bourget Airport, which in turn hosts the Musée de l'Air et de l'Espace (Air and Space Museum). A very small part of Le Bourget Airport lies on the territory of the commune of Le Bourget, which nonetheless gave its name to the airport. Most of the airport lies on the territory of the communes of Dugny, Bonneuil-en-France, and Gonesse. The Bureau d'Enquêtes et d'Analyses pour la Sécurité de l'Aviation Civile is also headquartered on the airport grounds and in Le Bourget proper.

== Toponymy ==
The name Le Bourget derives from a diminutive form of the French bourg, meaning 'market town', or the Latin burgellum, meaning 'little village'.

== Typology ==
Le Bourget is an urban commune, as it is one of the dense or intermediate density communes, as defined by the Insee communal density grid. (Note: According to the zoning of rural and urban municipalities published in November 2020, in application of the new definition of rurality validated on November 14, 2020 by the Interministerial Committee for Rural Areas.) It belongs to the urban unit of Paris, an inter-departmental conurbation comprising 407 communes and 10,785,092 inhabitants in 2017, of which it is a suburban commune.

The commune is also part of the functional area of Paris (Note: In October 2020, the concept of functional area replaced that of urban area in order to enable consistent comparisons with other European Union countries) where it is located in the main population and employment centre of the functional area. This area comprises 1,929 communes.

== Transport ==
=== Rail ===
Le Bourget is served by Le Bourget rail station on Paris RER line B. There is also an extensive freight rail yard with international traffic to Belgium, among others. Progressively, Le Bourget is planned to one of the principal transportation hub in the Paris North suburb: The Tangentielle Nord is an express tramway planned to enter in service in 2014, and two train stations are planned in the long term as part of the Grand Paris Express project with the future lines 16 and 17.

=== Highways ===
The town is served by two major Highways (Autoroutes), A1 autoroute in the north of the town, and A86 autoroute in the south of the city. Those two highways ensure a direct connection to major Paris Region hubs like La Defense (A86 West), Bobigny (A86 East), Roissy Charles de Gaulle Airport (A1 North), Paris (A1 South).

=== Air ===
Paris–Le Bourget Airport is the first business flights airport in Europe. It connects with 800 destinations in Europe.

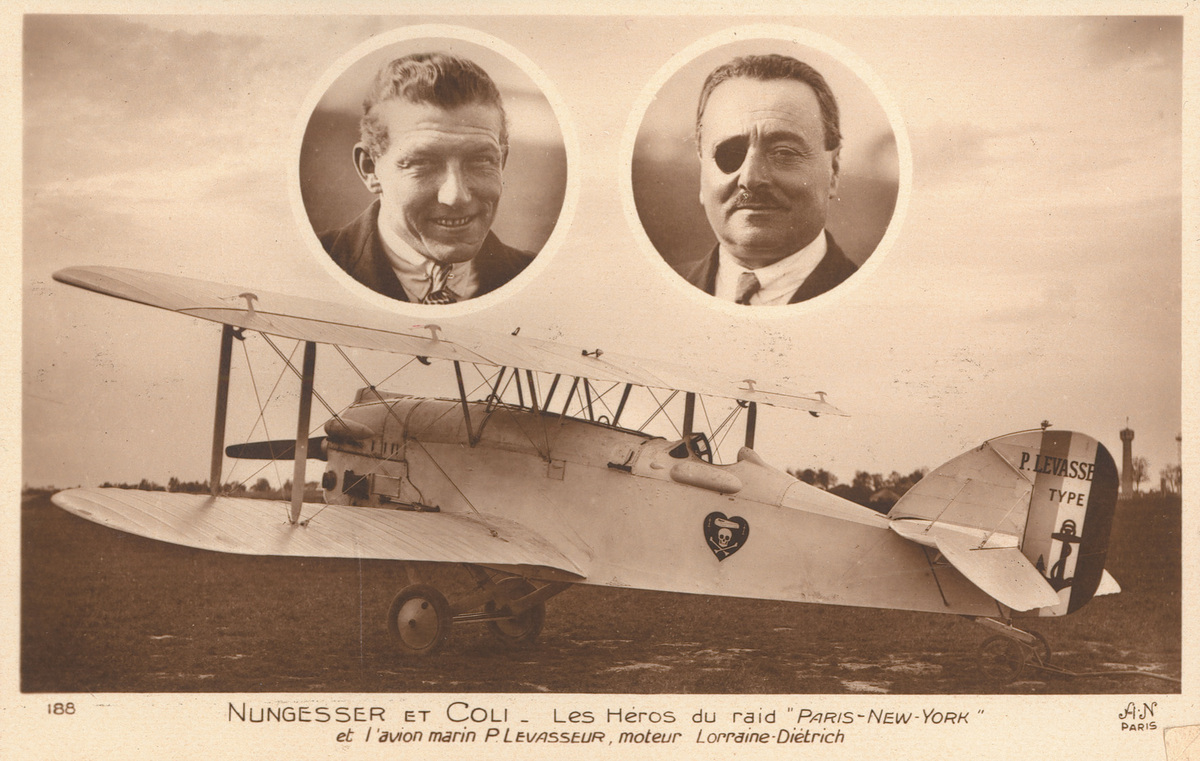
Pilots Nungesser and Coli and L'Oiseau Blanc, postcard (1927)

On May 8, 1927, the White Bird (l'Oiseau blanc) took off from Le Bourget and its pilots, Charles Nungesser and François Coli, hoped to reach New York City without stopovers. The plane disappeared without a trace. It was finally Charles Lindbergh who made the first air crossing of the North Atlantic between New York and Paris on May 21, 1927. He was welcomed as the "victor" of the North Atlantic, posing on his Spirit of St. Louis. An enormous crowd also welcomed Edouard Daladier on September 29, 1938, after the signing of the Munich Agreement signed between Germany, France, the United Kingdom and Italy represented respectively by Adolf Hitler, Edouard Daladier, Neville Chamberlain and Benito Mussolini (who had acted as intermediary).

== Climate ==
Climate data for Le Bourget (1991–2020 averages)
Month	Jan	Feb	Mar	Apr	May	Jun	Jul	Aug	Sep	Oct	Nov	Dec	Year
Record high °C (°F)	16.1 (61.0)	20.8 (69.4)	25.5 (77.9)	31.9 (89.4)	35.0 (95.0)	36.9 (98.4)	42.1 (107.8)	40.2 (104.4)	35.3 (95.5)	29.4 (84.9)	21.3 (70.3)	17.2 (63.0)	42.1 (107.8)
Mean daily maximum °C (°F)	7.5 (45.5)	8.7 (47.7)	12.6 (54.7)	16.1 (61.0)	19.6 (67.3)	23.0 (73.4)	25.5 (77.9)	25.4 (77.7)	21.5 (70.7)	16.5 (61.7)	11.1 (52.0)	7.9 (46.2)	16.3 (61.3)
Daily mean °C (°F)	4.9 (40.8)	5.4 (41.7)	8.4 (47.1)	11.2 (52.2)	14.7 (58.5)	18.0 (64.4)	20.2 (68.4)	20.0 (68.0)	16.5 (61.7)	12.7 (54.9)	8.1 (46.6)	5.4 (41.7)	12.1 (53.8)
Mean daily minimum °C (°F)	2.3 (36.1)	2.1 (35.8)	4.2 (39.6)	6.3 (43.3)	9.8 (49.6)	13.0 (55.4)	14.9 (58.8)	14.6 (58.3)	11.5 (52.7)	8.8 (47.8)	5.2 (41.4)	2.8 (37.0)	8.0 (46.4)
Record low °C (°F)	−18.2 (−0.8)	−16.8 (1.8)	−9.6 (14.7)	−3.7 (25.3)	−1.6 (29.1)	0.9 (33.6)	3.5 (38.3)	1.9 (35.4)	0.1 (32.2)	−5.6 (21.9)	−9.5 (14.9)	−15.1 (4.8)	−18.2 (−0.8)
Average precipitation mm (inches)	46.8 (1.84)	41.1 (1.62)	43.9 (1.73)	43.1 (1.70)	60.5 (2.38)	53.8 (2.12)	56.3 (2.22)	52.5 (2.07)	44.6 (1.76)	56.7 (2.23)	53.6 (2.11)	63.4 (2.50)	616.3 (24.26)
Average precipitation days (≥ 1.0 mm)	10.3	9.1	9.4	8.7	9.3	8.4	7.4	7.9	8.0	9.7	10.2	11.7	110.1
Mean monthly sunshine hours	57.4	73.7	129.3	171.0	189.4	203.0	213.2	206.4	161.6	111.3	63.7	54.3	1,634.2
Source: Meteociel

== Population ==
Historical population
Year	Pop.	±% p.a.
1968	9,679	—
1975	10,534	+1.22%
1982	11,021	+0.65%
1990	11,699	+0.75%
1999	12,110	+0.38%
2007	12,961	+0.85%
2012	15,139	+3.16%
2017	16,594	+1.85%
2023	15,925	−0.68%
Source: INSEE

== Culture ==
The world-renowned Gagosian Gallery is located in Le Bourget airport area.

== Facilities ==
Le Bourget houses the Crèche intercommunale Maryse Bastié, an intercommunal daycare.

== Education ==
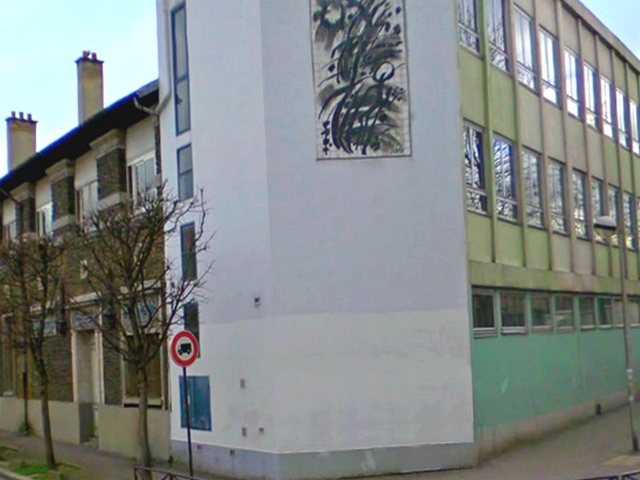
Collège Didier Daurat

=== Schools ===
École maternelle Saint-Exupéry is the sole maternelle public nursery school in Le Bourget, while École primaire Louis Blériot is the sole élémentaire- only public school in Le Bourget. Two municipal schools, Groupe scolaire Jean Jaurès and Groupe scolaire Jean Mermoz, serve both the maternelle and élémentaire levels. Collège Didier Daurat is the sole municipal collège (junior high school). There is one public high school, Lycée Germaine Tillion (dubbed Lycée du Bourget). Institution Privée Sainte-Marie, serving the maternelle, élémentaire and collège levels, is the sole private school in Le Bourget.

=== Libraries ===
The 350-square-metre (3,800 sq ft) Le Bourget Public Library has 45,000 books and almost 100 magazines. It is located within the Urban Community of Le Bourget Airport (Communauté d'Agglomération de l'Aéroport du Bourget).

The Le Point d'Interrogation media library, located in Le Bourget, a stone's throw from the Place du Marché and the Town Hall, was inaugurated in 2013 and welcomes the general public to 750 square meters on one level. It is aimed at all public and offers nearly 30,000 documents, including books, CDs, DVDs and magazine in a wide variety of genres. The library was named after the aircraft Le Point d'Interrogation (the Question Mark), piloted by French aviators Dieudonné Costes and Maurice Bellonte who performed the first westbound crossing of the North Atlantic, from Paris to New York City.

== Notable inhabitants ==
- Germinal Pierre Dandelin (April 12, 1794 – February 15, 1847) was a mathematician, soldier, and professor of engineering.
- Vizeadmiral Lothar von Arnauld de la Perière (March 18, 1886 – February 24, 1941), born in Posen (now Poznań, Poland) and of French-German descent, was a German U-boat commander during World War I.
- Bernard Tapie (January 26, 1943-October 3, 2021), lived at Le Bourget in the years 1950/1960 where he attended the Edgard-Quinet school (then renamed Didier-Daurat college). He lived with his parents and his younger brother Jean-Claude, at 11 Avenue Baudoin, in a very modest building that still exists.
- Vincent Capo-Canellas (born 1967) is a French politician. He serves as a Senator for Seine-Saint-Denis.
- Franck Silvestre (1967), former French soccer player, was trained at the Bourget football school from 1975 to 1983.

== Sister cities ==
Le Bourget has been twinned with

- Amityville, New York, USA since 1979
- Cullera, Spain, since 1982
- Little Falls, Minnesota, USA since 1987
- Zhukovsky in Russia, since 1993.

== Gallery ==
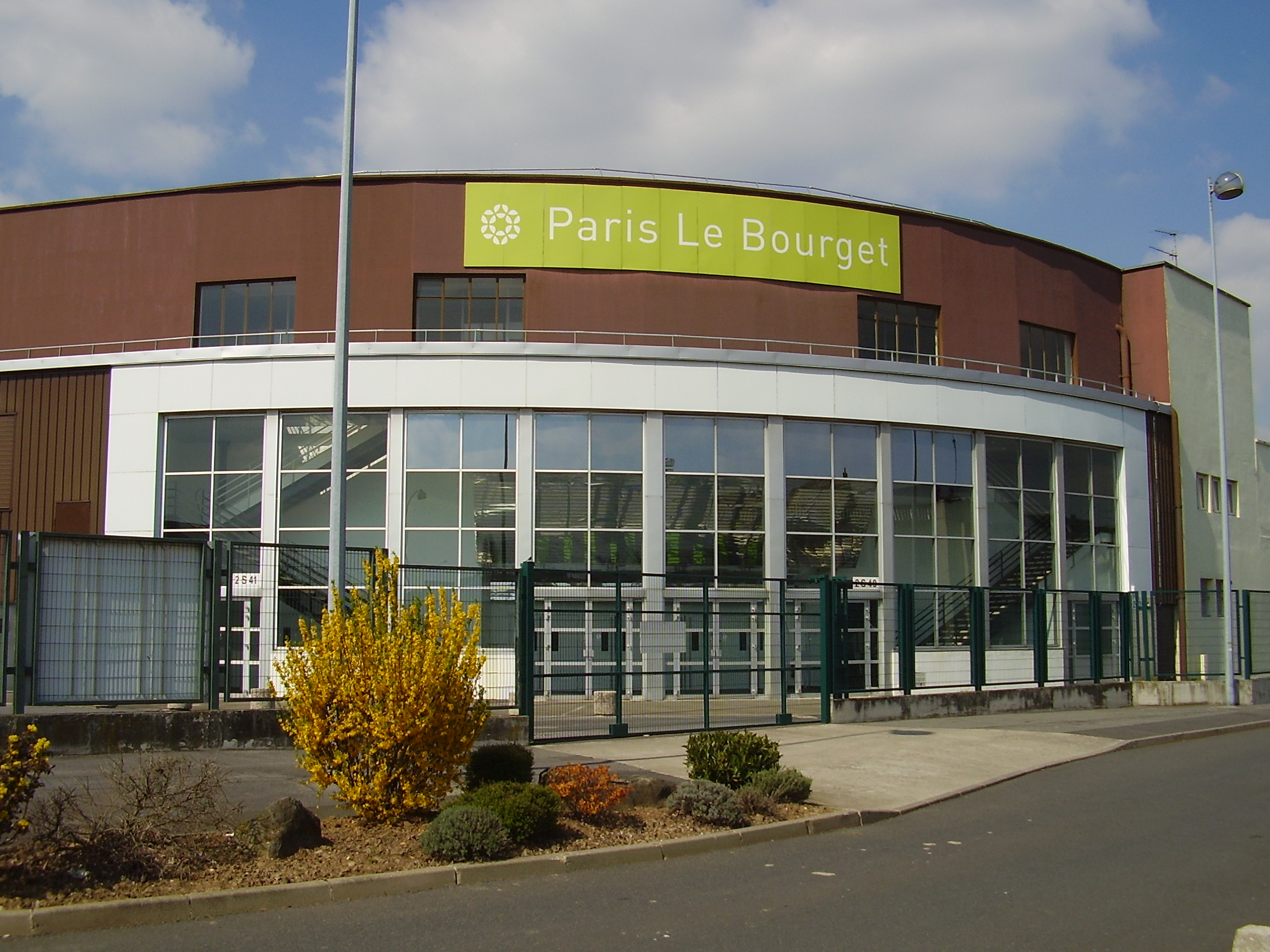
Le Bourget Airport

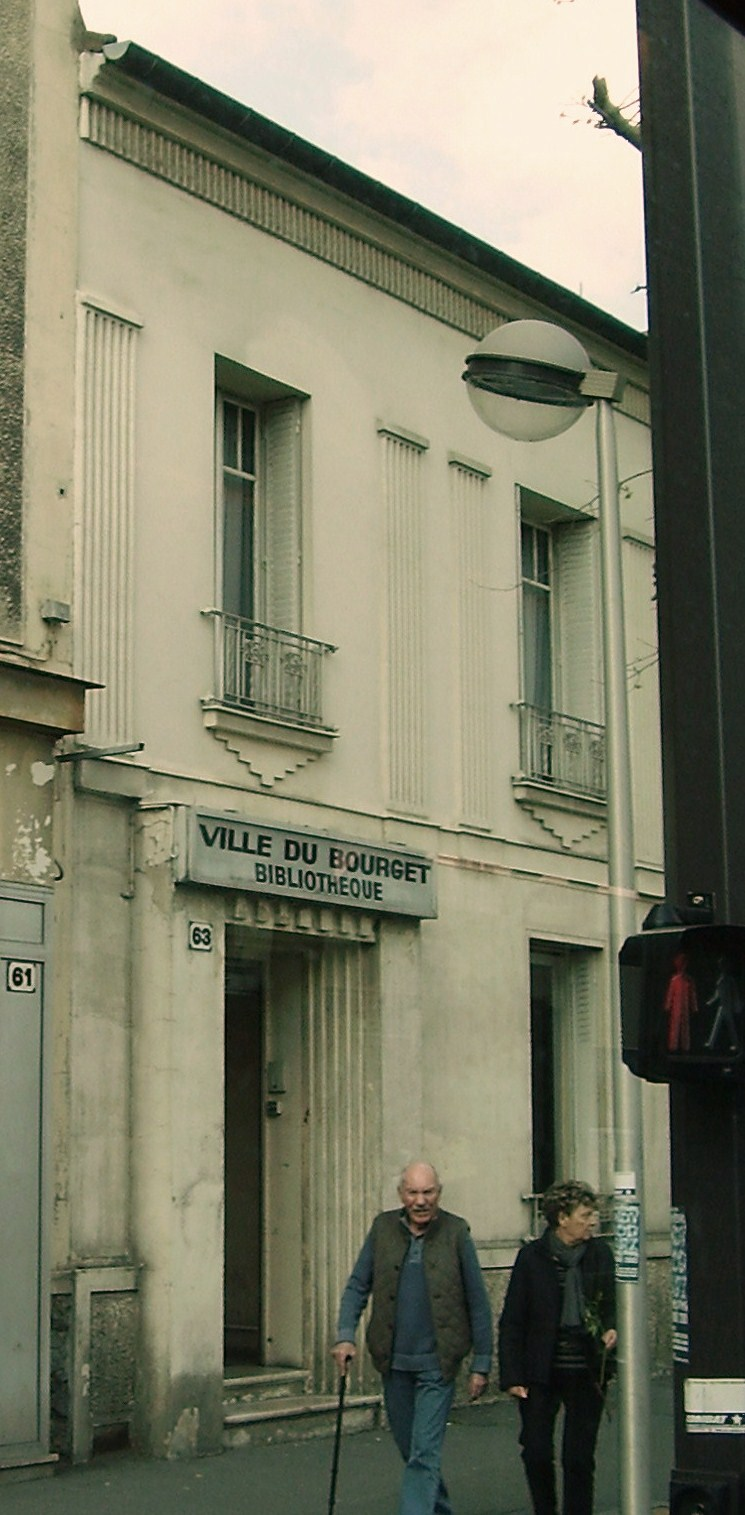
Le Bourget Library

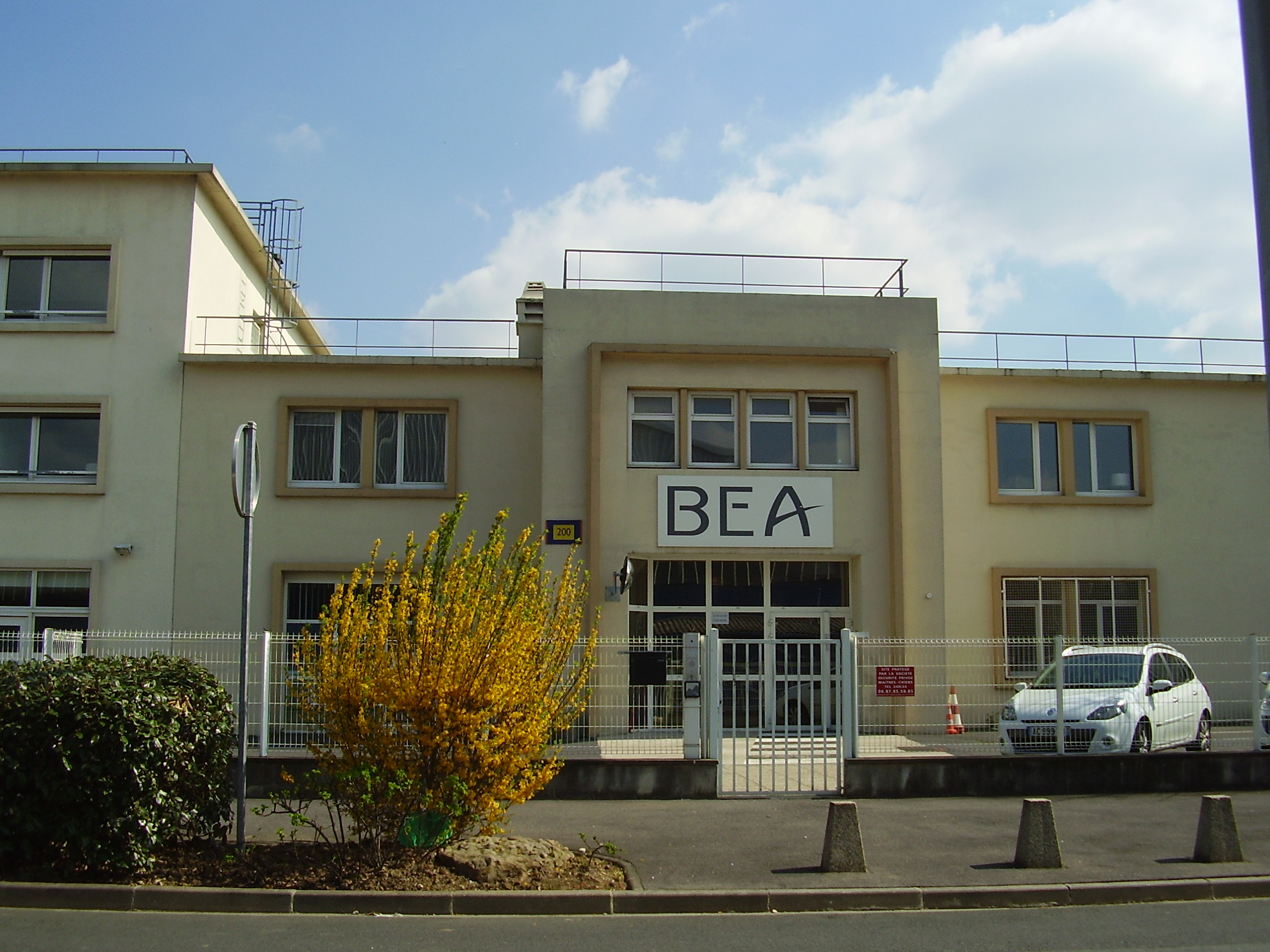
Building 153, the head office of the Bureau d'Enquêtes et d'Analyses pour la Sécurité de l'Aviation Civile (BEA) at Le Bourget Airport

== See also ==
- Communes of the Seine-Saint-Denis department
