= Hôtel de Ville, Le Blanc-Mesnil =

Town hall in Le Blanc-Mesnil, France

Hôtel de Ville
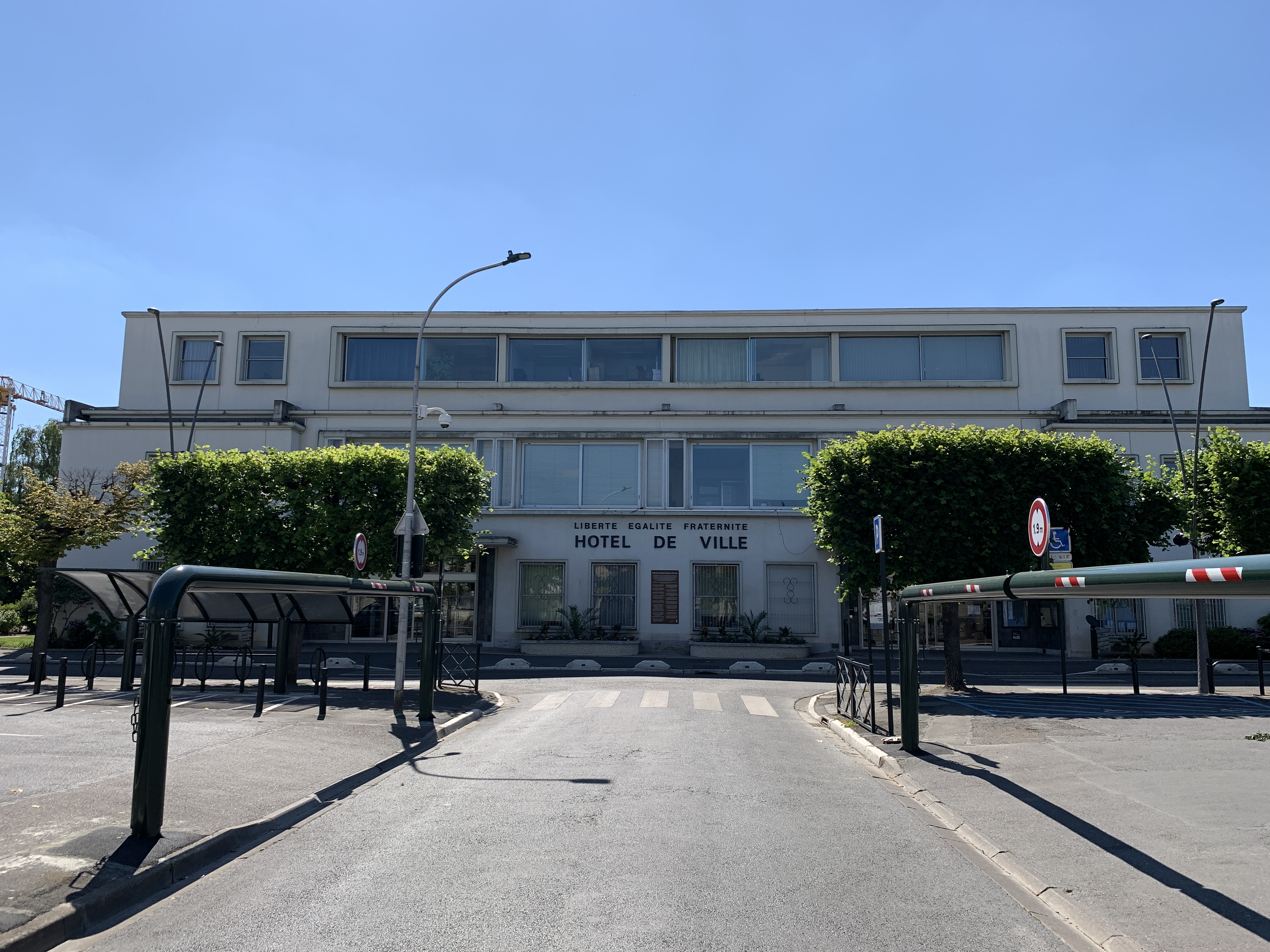
- The main frontage of the Hôtel de Ville in May 2020
- Interactive map of the Hôtel de Ville area

General information
- Type: City hall
- Architectural style: Modern style
- Location: Le Blanc-Mesnil, France
- Coordinates: 48.9388°N 2.4638°E
- Completed: 1967

Design and construction
- Architect: André Lurçat

The Hôtel de Ville (French pronunciation: [otɛl də vil], City Hall) is a municipal building in Le Blanc-Mesnil, Seine-Saint-Denis in the northeastern suburbs of Paris, standing on Place Gabriel Péri.

== History ==
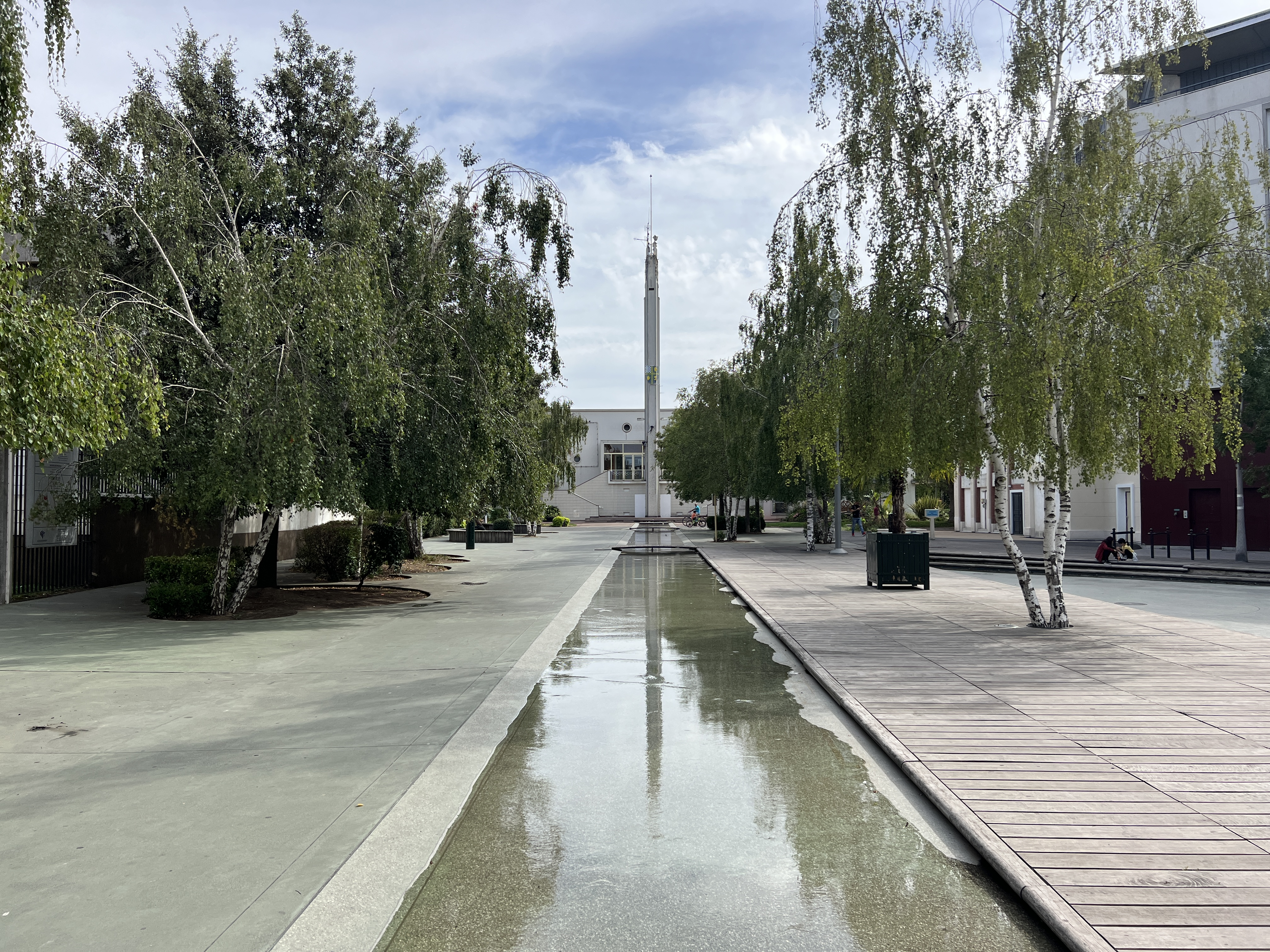
Rear view of the town hall showing the fleche (spire)

In the mid-19th century, the town council established their first municipal office in a hunting lodge commissioned by the Count of Lavau, who was heir to the Delley de la Garde family. The family's ancestor Nicolas de Delley de la Garde had served as advisor to both Louis XV and Louis XVI in the 18th century.

The council relocated to a building on Avenue Descartes (now Rue Édouard Renault) from 1883, but this quickly proved inadequate, especially as the building also incorporated a school, and in 1912, the council moved to a purpose-built town hall in Avenue de Drancy (now Rue Henri Barbusse). The design involved a broadly symmetrical main frontage facing onto Avenue de Drancy. There were two doorways and three casement windows on the ground floor, four casement windows with cornices on the first floor, and four casement windows without cornices on the second floor. The windows on the upper floors were flanked by large panels spanning both floors.

In the mid-1930s, the town council led by the mayor, Henri Duquenne, asked André Lurçat to design a modern town hall. Implementation of the project was delayed by the Second World War and lack of finance. After the war, the new mayor, Eugène le Moign, asked Lurçat to update his design. The new building was designed in the modern style, built in concrete and glass and was officially opened by a later mayor, Robert Fregossy, in 1967.

The layout involved two separate blocks, connected at the centre by a narrower connecting block, with a distinctive fleche (spire) at the back of the rear block. The design involved a symmetrical main frontage of ten bays facing east onto Place Gabriel Péri. The outer two bays at each end were projected forward on the ground floor and the first floor, while the next two bays on each side contained doorways with canopies. The four inner bays were fenestrated with casement windows on the ground floor. The first floor was fenestrated by a row of casement windows, while the second floor, which was slightly narrower than the lower floors, was fenestrated by a row of casement windows with a pair of square windows at either end. Internally, the principal rooms were the Salle du Conseil (council chamber), the Salle des Fêtes (ballroom) et the Salle de Réception (reception room).

The entrance porch was decorated with mosaics by Marc Saint-Saëns, and a tapestry by the architect's brother, Jean Lurçat, was also installed in the building.
