= Lycée Germaine Tillion =

Lycée Germaine Tillion may refer to:

- Lycée Germaine Tillion (Le Bourget) in the Paris metropolitan area
- Lycée Germaine Tillion (Sain Bel) - Sain Bel
- Lycée Germaine Tillion (Thiers) - Thiers, France
