= Periphery (France) =

Statistical area designating a commuter belt around an urban unit

A periphery (couronne) is an INSEE statistical area designating a commuter belt around an urban unit (Fr: unité urbaine). Together these complete the INSEE urban area. Based on France's commune system (interlocking administrative subdivisions often comparable to civil parishes, towns or cities), a commune is considered part of a couronne when

1. it is not densely constructed enough or is too isolated to be part of any unité urbaine (or "pôle urbain" if it is the core of the agglomeration), and
2. at least 40% of its population commutes to workplaces in a unité urbaine or pôle urbain, or to another commune connected to a unité urbaine through the same criteria.

Peripheries form the full functional footprint of a metropolitan area. They measure suburbanization, daily worker migration, and housing spread.
