= Lycée Robert Schuman =

Lycée Robert Schuman may refer to:

== France ==
- Lycée Robert Schuman (Charenton-le-Pont), Charenton-le-Pont, Val-de-Marne (Paris metropolitan area)
- Lycée Robert Schuman (Dugny), a private school in Dugny, Seine-Saint-Denis (Paris metropolitan area)
- Lycée Robert Schuman (Haugenau), Hagenau
- Lycée Robert Schuman (Metz) - Metz, Moselle

== Luxembourg ==
- Lycée Robert Schuman (Luxembourg) in Luxembourg City
