= Blue Line (airline) =

French charter passenger airline

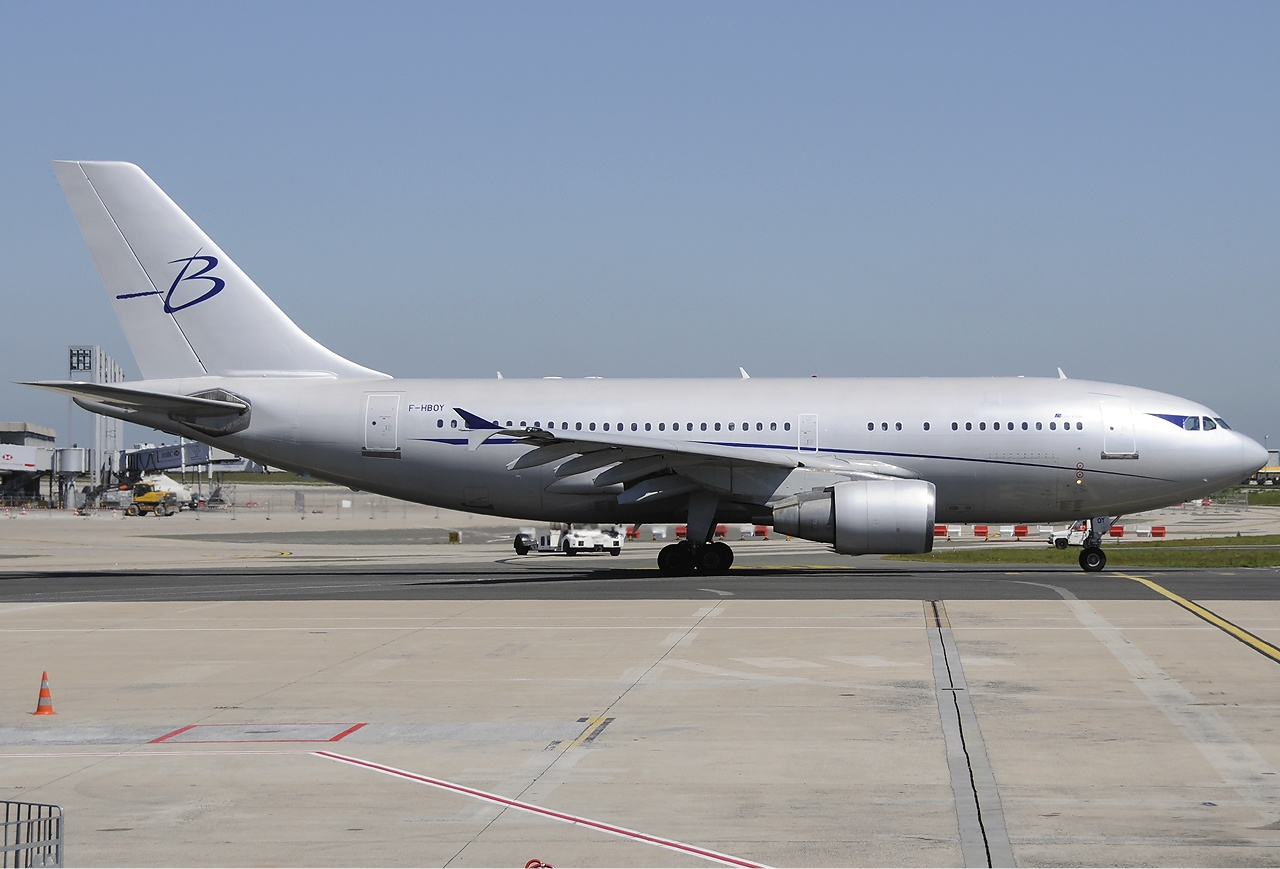
- Airbus A310-300
IATA	ICAO	Call sign
4Y	BLE	BLUE BERRY
- Founded: 2002
- Ceased operations: 6 October 2010
- Hubs: Charles de Gaulle Airport
- Fleet size: 7
- Headquarters: Roissy-en-France, France
- Website: flyblueline.com

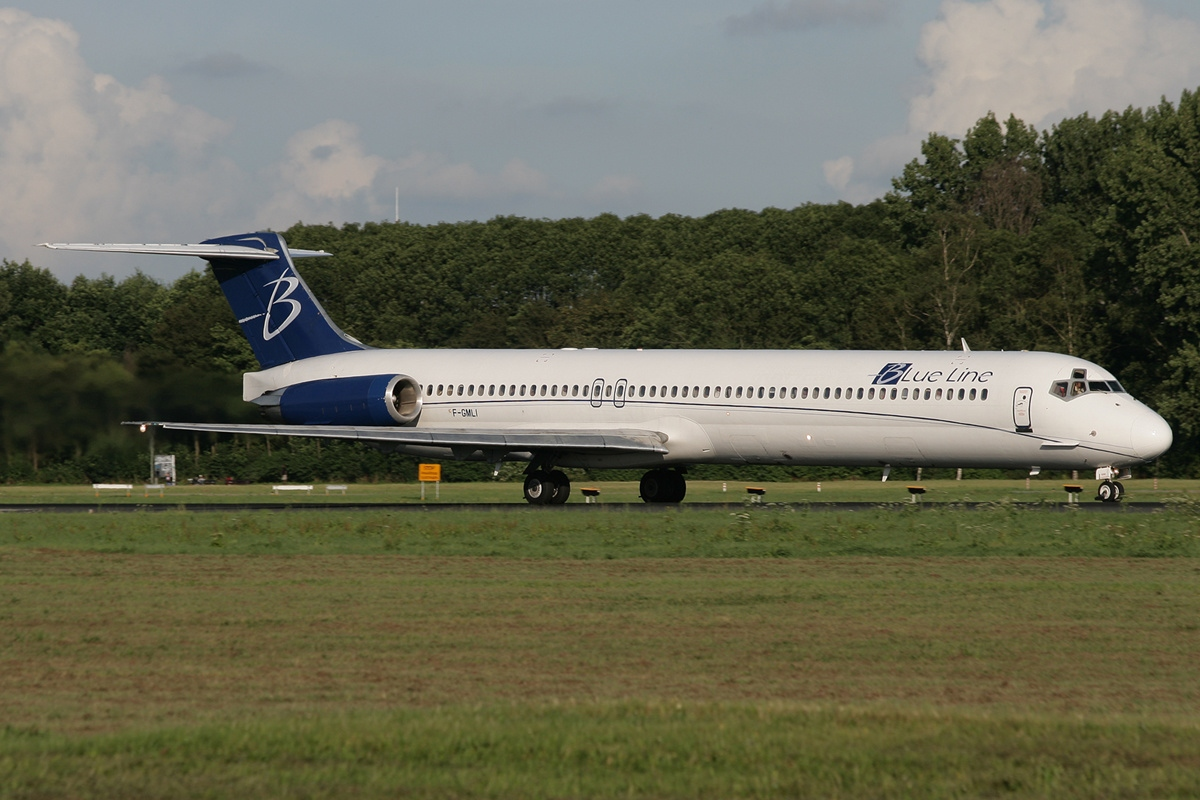
McDonnell Douglas MD-83

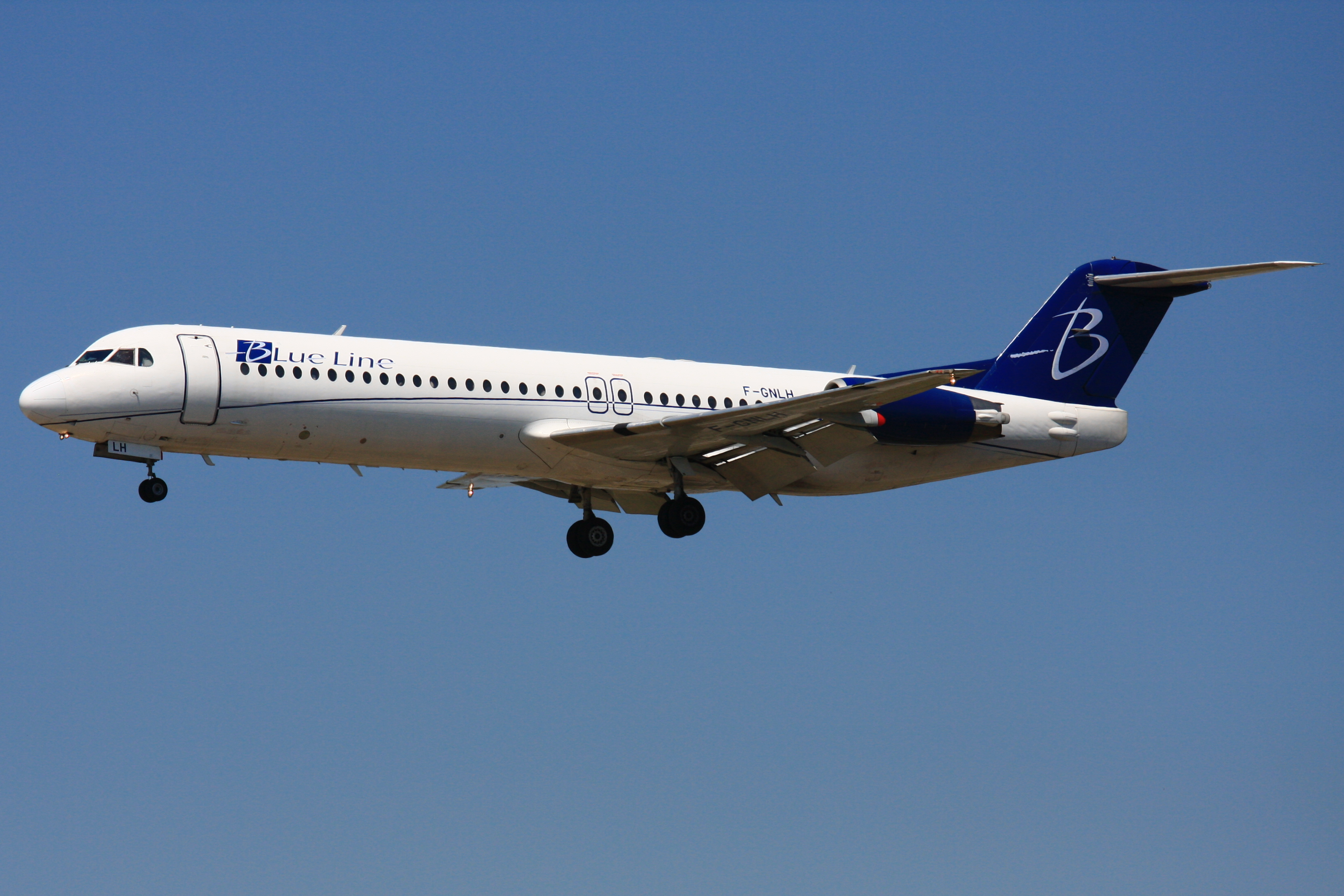
Fokker 100

Blue Line was a charter passenger airline with its head office in Building B of Paris Nord 2, Parc des Lumières in Roissy-en-France, France. It operated VIP flights and charter services for tour operators, as well as wet-lease contracts. Its main base was Charles de Gaulle Airport. It ceased operation on 6 October 2010, after being liquidated by the Tribunal de Commerce de Pontoise.

== History ==
Blue Line was established in January 2002 by Xavier Remondeau (Chairman and Chief Executive) and seven other shareholders, all aviation professionals. Operations were started in May 2002. It had 190 employees. The airline operated mostly charters and wet and dry leases aircraft to airlines. Many music groups have used their aircraft, such as U2. Blue Line uses a fleet of 1 Airbus A310s and McDonnell Douglas MD-83s for longer haul services, with the A310s being used for the longest range services. A fleet of Fokker 100s were used for regional and shorter haul flights across Europe. The airline operated this fleet for its charters. It was possible to configure an aircraft in any specification if needed. The A310s operated at 210-255 passengers in airline configurations, the MD-83s operated at 150-172 passengers in airline configurations, and the Fokker at around 100 passengers. Most aircraft are wet leased to airlines, but if the need were to arise, an aircraft could have been configured for VIP operations. The airline was based in France, but had services to as far south as Brazil and as far north as Norway.

== Fleet ==
The Blue Line fleet included the following aircraft:

Blue Line Fleet
Aircraft	Total
Airbus A310-300	1
Fokker 100	2
McDonnell Douglas MD-83	4
