= Roissy-en-France =

- Commune
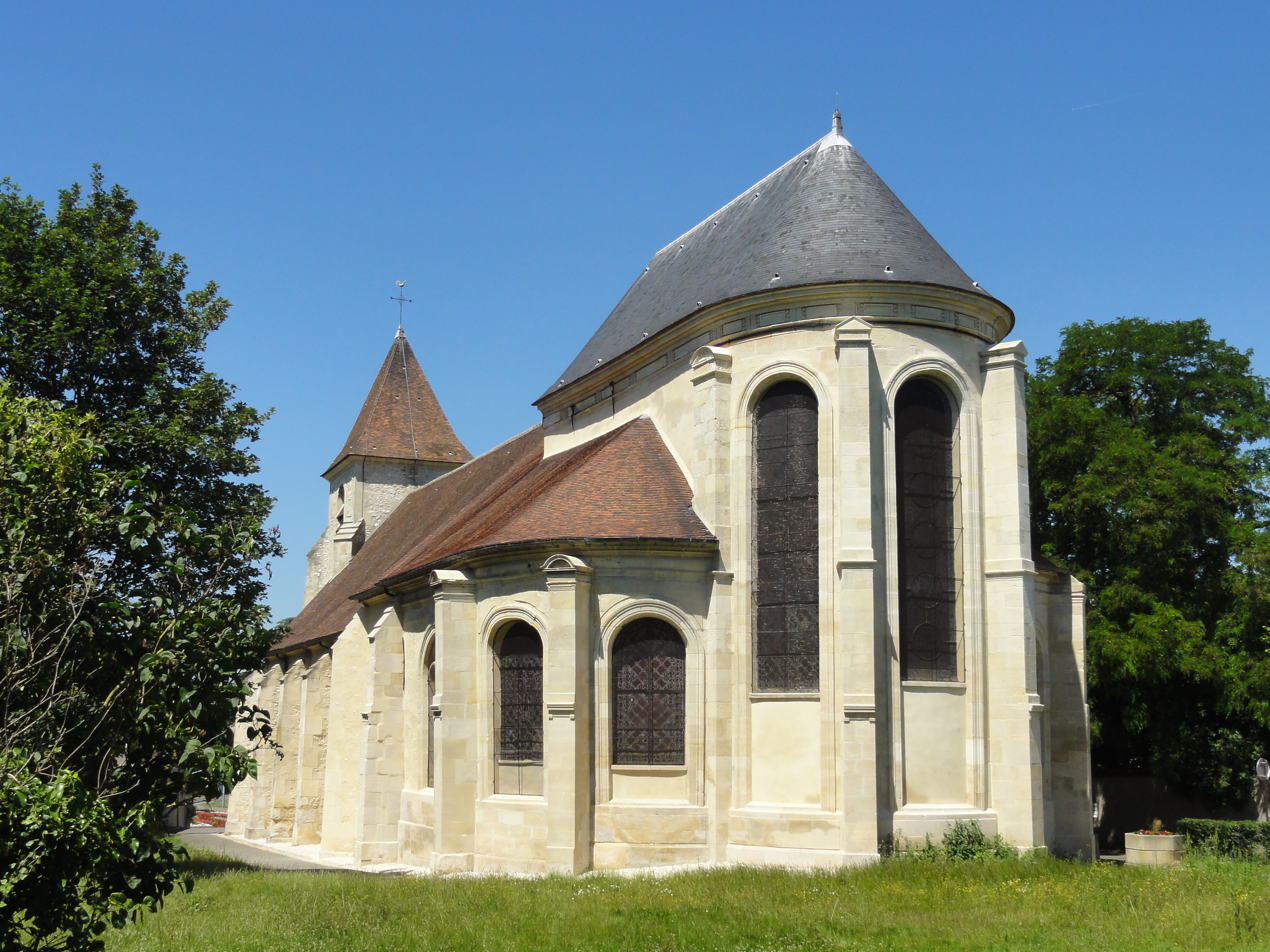
- Église Saint-Eloi

- Coat of arms

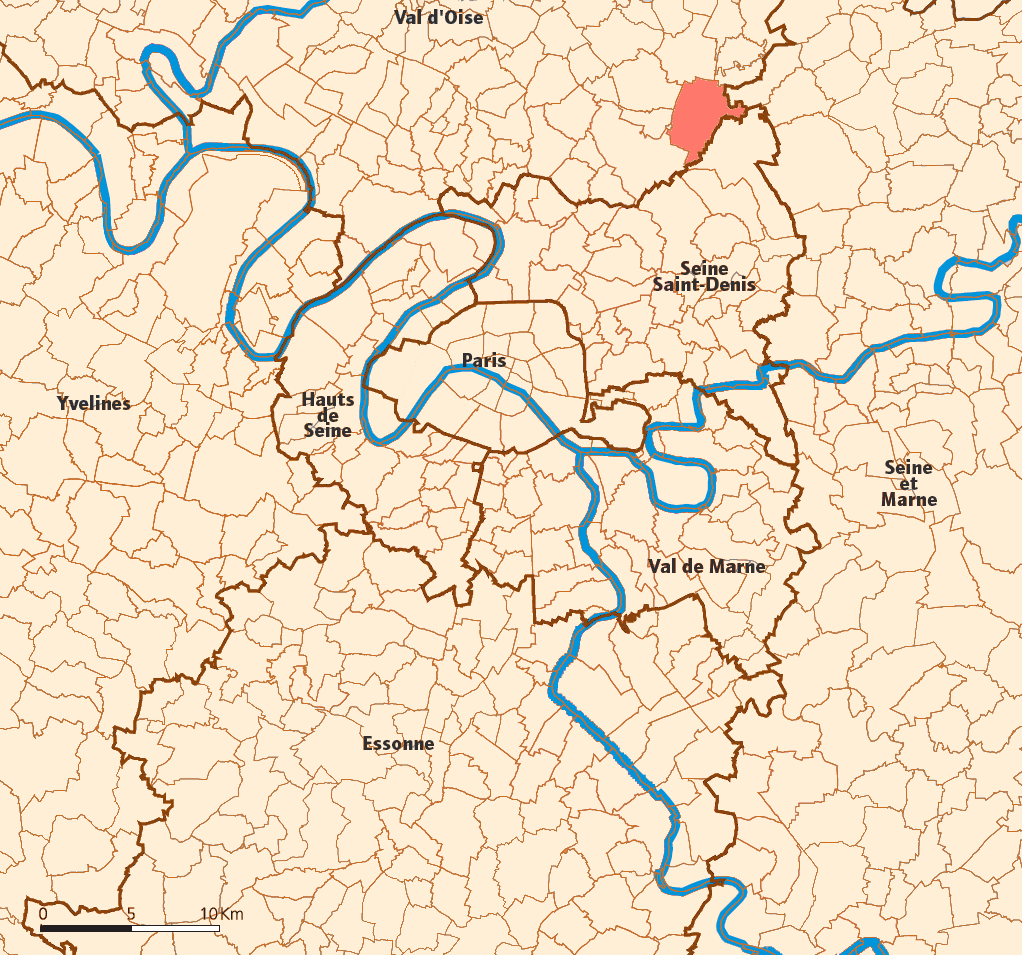
- Location (in red) within Paris inner and outer suburbs
- Location of Roissy-en-France
- Location within France Location within Île-de-France (region)
- Coordinates: 49°00′18″N 2°31′08″E
- Country: France
- Region: Île-de-France
- Department: Val-d'Oise
- Arrondissement: Sarcelles
- Canton: Villiers-le-Bel
- Intercommunality: CA Roissy Pays de France

Government
  - Mayor (2022–2026): Michèle Calix
- Area^{1}: 14.09 km^{2} (5.44 sq mi)
- Elevation: 95 m (312 ft)
- Population (2023): 2,674
  - Density: 189.8/km^{2} (491.5/sq mi)
- Time zone: UTC+01:00 (CET)
  - Summer (DST): UTC+02:00 (CEST)
- INSEE/Postal code: 95527 /95700
- ^{1} French Land Register data, which excludes lakes, ponds, glaciers > 1 km^{2} (0.386 sq mi or 247 acres) and river estuaries.

Roissy-en-France (French pronunciation: [ʁwasi ɑ̃ fʁɑ̃s], lit. "Roissy-in-France" after the Pays de France), colloquially simply called Roissy, is a commune in the northeastern outer suburbs of Paris, France, in the Val-d'Oise department. It is located 20.7 km (12.9 mi) from the centre of Paris.

One-quarter of Charles de Gaulle Airport (France's main airport) is located in the commune (but none of its terminals), which gave its name to the airport originally. Later renamed, the airport is still commonly referred to as "Roissy" in France. The rest of the airport lies on the territory of Tremblay-en-France and several other communes.

== Name ==
In the name Roissy-en-France, 'France' refers not to the country of France but to an area (pays) of the historical province of Île-de-France. Île-de-France was made up of several pays, most notably Pays de France and Hurepoix. Pays de France was the fertile plain located immediately north of the City of Paris, with the city of Saint-Denis at its centre. Pays de France is now almost entirely built up and is covered by the northern suburbs of Paris. Pays de France is also known as "Parisis" and as the plaine de France ("plain of France"), and its name still appears in the name of some communes in the northern suburbs of Paris, such as Roissy-en-France (which literally means "Roissy in the Pays de France").

== Population ==
Historical population
Year	Pop.	±% p.a.
1968	1,359	—
1975	1,362	+0.03%
1982	1,401	+0.40%
1990	2,054	+4.90%
1999	2,367	+1.59%
2007	2,537	+0.87%
2012	2,816	+2.11%
2017	2,883	+0.47%
2023	2,674	−1.25%
Source: INSEE

== Transport ==
Roissy-en-France is not served by Paris Métro, RER, or suburban rail network. The closest station to Roissy-en-France is Aéroport Charles de Gaulle 1 station on line B of the RER, Paris Region's express suburban rail system. This station is located inside the airport, on the part of the airport belonging to the commune of Tremblay-en-France, 3 km (1.9 mi) from the town center of Roissy-en-France.

== Economy ==
Blue Line, a charter passenger airline, had its head office in Building B of Paris Nord 2, Parc des Lumières in Roissy-en-France.

Air France's head office is located in the Roissypôle complex on the grounds of Charles de Gaulle Airport and in Tremblay-en-France, near Roissy-en-France.

== Education ==
The community has two schools, école maternelle Saint-Exupéry (preschool) and école élémentaire Jean Mermoz.

== Climate ==
Roissy-en-France has an oceanic climate (Köppen climate classification Cfb). The average annual temperature in Roissy-en-France is 12.1 °C (53.8 °F). The average annual rainfall is 694.3 mm (27.33 in) with December as the wettest month. The temperatures are highest on average in July, at around 20.1 °C (68.2 °F), and lowest in January, at around 4.7 °C (40.5 °F). The highest temperature ever recorded in Roissy-en-France was 41.4 °C (106.5 °F) on 25 July 2019; the coldest temperature ever recorded was −17.8 °C (0.0 °F) on 17 January 1985.

Comparison of local Meteorological data with other cities in France
Town	Sunshine (hours/yr)	Rain (mm/yr)	Snow (days/yr)	Storm (days/yr)	Fog (days/yr)
National average	1,973	770	14	22	40
Roissy-en-France	N/A	694.3	13.8	20.1	40.1
Paris	1,661	637	12	18	10
Nice	2,724	767	1	29	1
Strasbourg	1,693	665	29	29	56
Brest	1,605	1,211	7	12	75

Climate data for Roissy-en-France (1991−2020 normals, extremes 1974−present)
Month	Jan	Feb	Mar	Apr	May	Jun	Jul	Aug	Sep	Oct	Nov	Dec	Year
Record high °C (°F)	16.0 (60.8)	20.5 (68.9)	25.3 (77.5)	28.6 (83.5)	31.9 (89.4)	36.5 (97.7)	41.4 (106.5)	39.0 (102.2)	34.4 (93.9)	28.9 (84.0)	21.2 (70.2)	17.3 (63.1)	41.4 (106.5)
Mean daily maximum °C (°F)	7.0 (44.6)	8.2 (46.8)	12.2 (54.0)	15.8 (60.4)	19.3 (66.7)	22.6 (72.7)	25.1 (77.2)	25.1 (77.2)	21.1 (70.0)	16.2 (61.2)	10.7 (51.3)	7.5 (45.5)	15.9 (60.6)
Daily mean °C (°F)	4.7 (40.5)	5.3 (41.5)	8.3 (46.9)	11.2 (52.2)	14.6 (58.3)	17.8 (64.0)	20.1 (68.2)	20.1 (68.2)	16.6 (61.9)	12.7 (54.9)	8.1 (46.6)	5.2 (41.4)	12.1 (53.8)
Mean daily minimum °C (°F)	2.3 (36.1)	2.3 (36.1)	4.5 (40.1)	6.7 (44.1)	10.0 (50.0)	13.1 (55.6)	15.1 (59.2)	15.0 (59.0)	12.1 (53.8)	9.2 (48.6)	5.4 (41.7)	2.9 (37.2)	8.2 (46.8)
Record low °C (°F)	−17.8 (0.0)	−12.4 (9.7)	−9.1 (15.6)	−3.9 (25.0)	0.3 (32.5)	2.6 (36.7)	7.3 (45.1)	6.1 (43.0)	2.4 (36.3)	−3.1 (26.4)	−8.1 (17.4)	−10.6 (12.9)	−17.8 (0.0)
Average precipitation mm (inches)	57.2 (2.25)	48.0 (1.89)	49.8 (1.96)	47.8 (1.88)	66.5 (2.62)	61.9 (2.44)	59.9 (2.36)	57.8 (2.28)	50.0 (1.97)	60.1 (2.37)	60.4 (2.38)	74.9 (2.95)	694.3 (27.33)
Average precipitation days (≥ 1.0 mm)	11.3	9.8	10.0	8.8	10.0	8.6	8.1	8.2	7.9	10.1	10.8	12.3	115.9
Average snowy days	3.2	4.5	1.7	0.6	0	0	0	0	0	0	1.1	2.7	13.8
Mean monthly sunshine hours	—	91.6	139.6	196.7	218.3	211.2	240.6	214.9	178.6	112.3	69.3	61.5	—
Source: Météo-France

== See also ==
- Communes of the Val-d'Oise department
