= Lycée Germaine Tillion (Le Bourget) =

Lycée Germaine-Tillion
- Lycée du Bourget
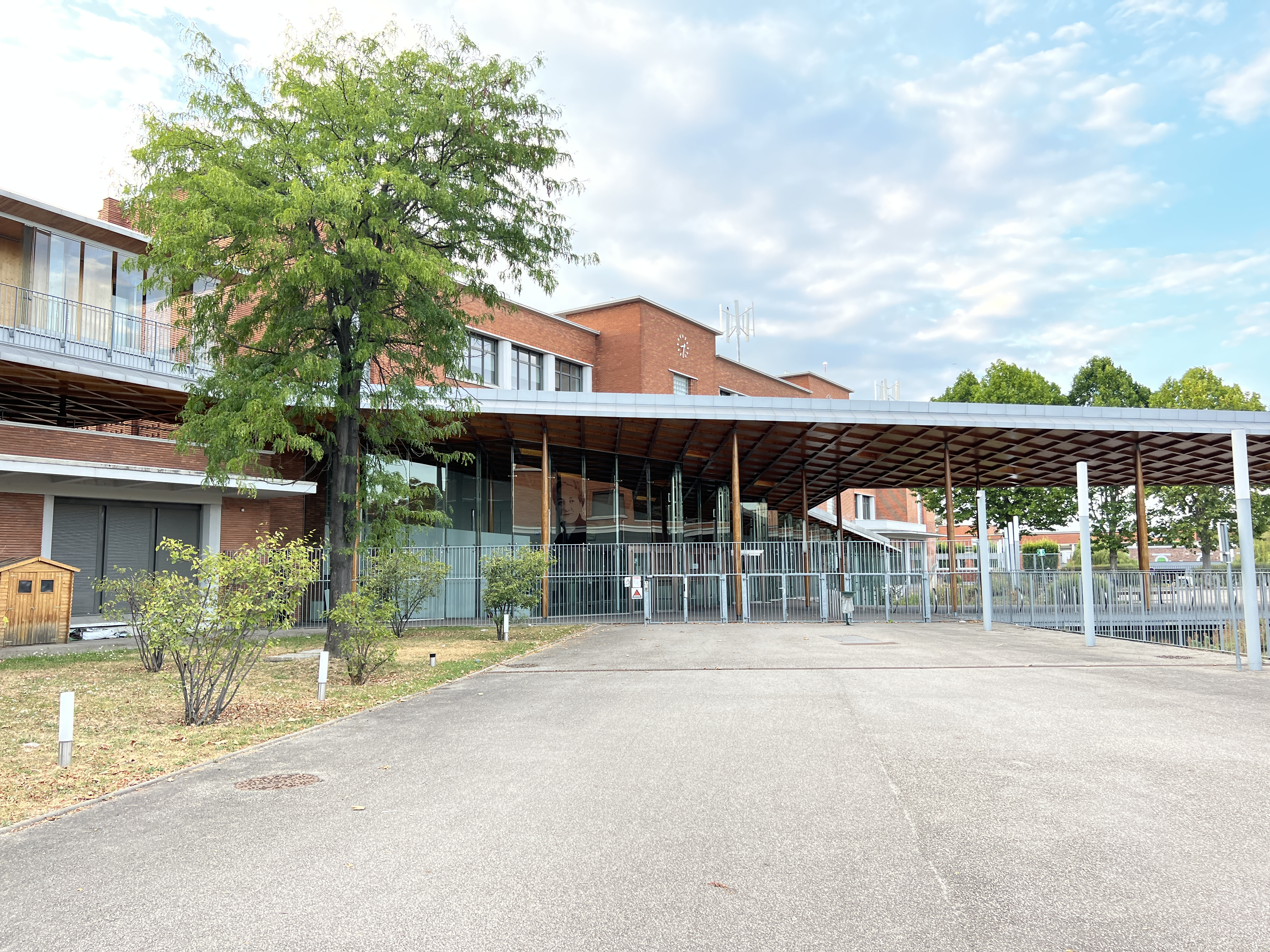

Location
- 48 bis rue Anizan Cavillan; Le Bourget, Seine-Saint-Denis; France

Information
- Type: Public High School
- Established: 2014
- Grades: 10 to 12
- Mascot: Germaine Tillion
- Nickname: LGT
- National ranking: 191st
- Website: germainetillionlycee.fr

The Lycée Germaine Tillion, formerly Lycée du Bourget, is a public secondary school is located at 48 bis rue Anizan Cavillon in Le Bourget. The high school was founded in September 2014. It welcomes more than 700 students from the second to the final year. There is Microlycée 93 dedicated to dropout students. The school received the 2017 National Education Innovation Award in the Écoles et établissements (Schools and Boards) category.

== History ==
=== The origin of the site ===
Before being a high school, this establishment was a regular school under the acronym "IUFM" where teachers were trained for elementary schools and kindergartens, but the school shut down in the 2000s and remained abandoned until 2014.

=== The establishment today ===
The high school offers high school general / technical teaching as well as a microlycée (a special unit to prevent students from dropping out of school). The high school hosts mainly students from Bourget, Dugny and Drancy.

However, the deputy and mayor of Drancy, Jean-Christophe Lagarde, was upset at the opening of the new high school Bourget, claiming the new school in Le Bourget would take nearly twice as less Drancy students than originally announced (650 instead of 1200). The regional government however denied allegations and figures.

The school opened in September 2014, becoming the 65th public high school in Seine-Saint-Denis.

In 2016, the school authorities of Île-de-France renamed the Lycée du Bourget to Germaine Tillion.

=== Pedagogical structure ===
High School Pedagogical Structure for the year 2018-2019:

Grade	'Number of classes'	Number of students
Tenth	7	224
Eleventh	9	217
Twelfth	11	309
Total	27	750

== Rankings and results ==
=== Rankings ===
In 2018, the school ranked 26th on a district scale (department of Seine-Saint-Denis), 109th on a regional scale (Ile-de-France) and 191st nationwide (France).

=== Results ===
Pass rates for Baccalauréat in 2017:

type	Gross Rate	Expected Rate	Added value	Effective Bac
L (humanities)	84	79	5	31
ES (economics)	73	69	4	62
S (sciences)	77	78	-1	81
STMG (management)	72	79	-7	29
Average	76	76	0	203

== Campus ==
The grounds on which the school building (formerly known as École normale) was built were renovated for a cost of EUR 28.51 million. The building, with a capacity of 655 students, has a 1930s-style architecture.

== Accessibility ==
The Germaine Tillion high school can be directly accessed by bus (RATP line 143, at École Normale bus stop) or by suburban train (RER line B, at Le Bourget rail station), .
