= Mickael Marolany =

French footballer (born 1975)

Mickael Marolany (born 13 April 1975 in Le Blanc-Mesnil, Seine-Saint-Denis) is a French former professional footballer who played as a full-back. He made 115 appearances in Ligue 2 for AS Beauvais Oise, CS Louhans-Cuiseaux and ES Wasquehal between 1992 and 2003.
