= Jérémy Abadie =

French footballer (born 1988)

Personal information
- Full name: Jérémy Abadie
- Date of birth: 17 October 1988 (age 38)
- Place of birth: Le Blanc-Mesnil, France
- Height: 1.79 m (5 ft 10 in)
- Position: Midfielder

Team information
- Current team: La Châtaigneraie

Youth career
- US Torcy
- 2001–2004: Clairefontaine
- 2004–2005: Strasbourg

Senior career*
Years	Team	Apps	(Gls)
2005–2010	Strasbourg B	9	(1)
2009–2010	Strasbourg	66	(0)
2011	US Saint-Malo	3	(1)
2011–2012	Red Star	17	(0)
2012–2013	Mulhouse	33	(2)
2013–2015	Les Herbiers VF	51	(3)
2015–2017	La Roche VF	47	(2)
2017–2019	FC Challans	49	(8)
2019–	La Châtaigneraie	13	(5)
- * Club domestic league appearances and goals as of 1 August 2020

Jérémy Abadie (born 17 October 1988) is a French professional footballer who plays for as a midfielder for AS La Châtaigneraie.

== Career ==
Abadie was born in Le Blanc-Mesnil, Seine-Saint-Denis. He has played in the Ligue 2 for RC Strasbourg.

In January 2008, Abadie was called up for a training camp with the French Under-21 Futsal team for a four-day camp.

Abadie moved to FC Challans from La Roche VF in 2017.
