= Canton of La Courneuve =

Administrative division of Seine-Saint-Denis in Northern France

Coordinates: 48.93°N 2.40°E

The canton of La Courneuve is an administrative division of the Seine-Saint-Denis department, Île-de-France region, northern France. Its borders were modified at the French canton reorganisation which came into effect in March 2015. Its seat is in La Courneuve.

It consists of the following communes:

1. Le Bourget
2. La Courneuve
3. Dugny
