= André Lurçat =

French modernist architect (1894–1970)

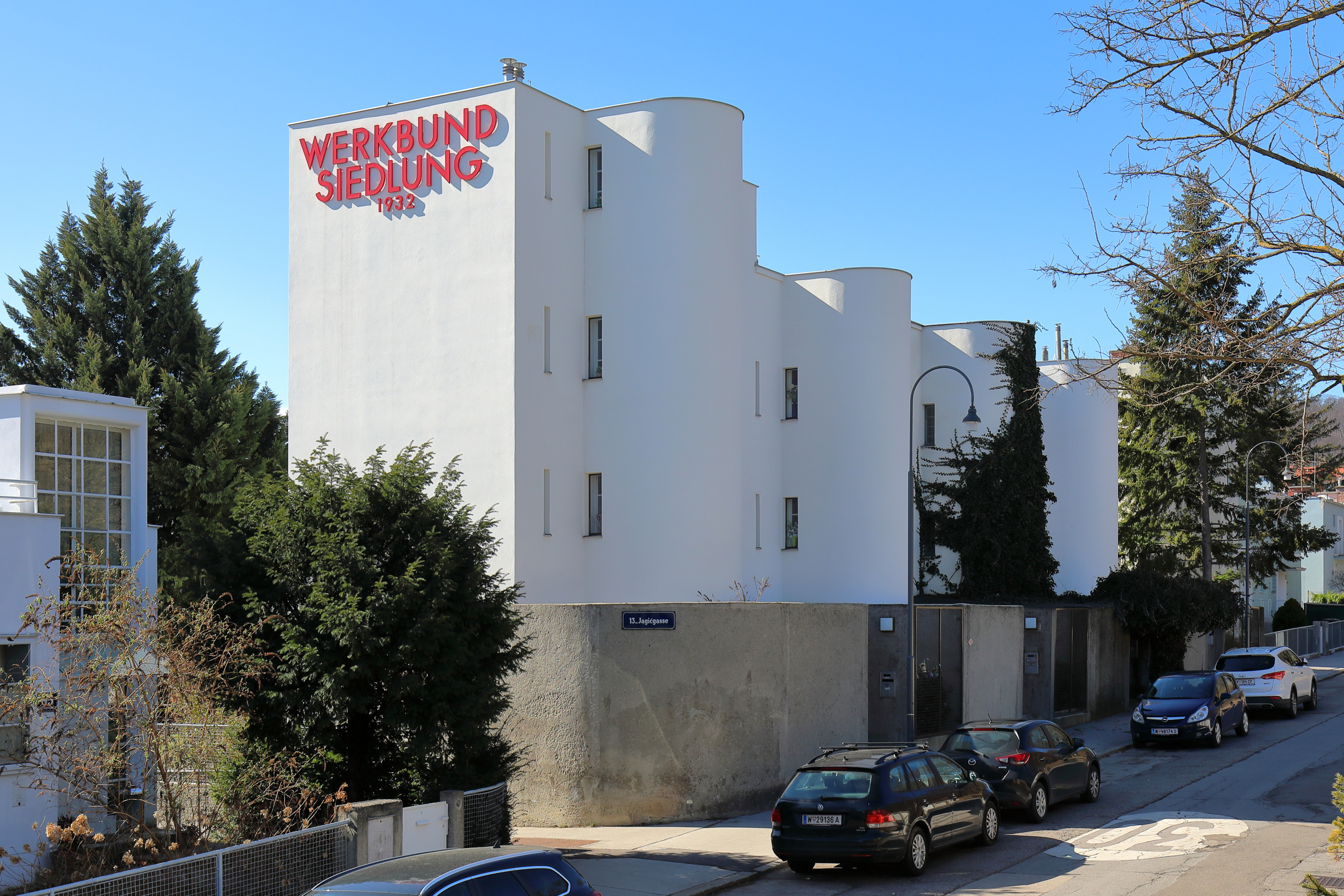
Building by André Lurçat, Werkbundsiedlung, Vienna

André Lurçat (French pronunciation: [ɑ̃dʁe lyʁsa]; 27 August 1894 – 11 July 1970) was a French modernist architect, landscape architect, furniture designer, city planner, and founding member of CIAM. He was active in the rebuilding in French cities after World War II. He was the brother of visual artist Jean Lurçat.

Lurçat was born in Bruyères, studied at the École des Beaux-Arts in Nancy, worked in the office of Robert Mallet-Stevens, began building a series of houses in the 1920s, and became interested in the principles of social housing to address the French housing crisis between the wars. In 1928 he was a founding member of the Congrès International d'Architecture Moderne (International Congress of Modern Architecture). Along with Adolf Loos, Richard Neutra, Margarete Schütte-Lihotzky and others, he demonstrated a family residence at the Vienna Werkbund exhibition of 1932, produced his best-known Villa Hefferlin at Ville-d'Avray, then went to Moscow to work for the Soviet government from 1934 to 1937.

Lurçat is known for advancing the cause of modernism in landscape architecture; he took a position, contrary to the proponents of Existenzminimum, that all social housing must include gardens. He is also known for his planned postwar reconstruction of the French city of Maubeuge (1945). He was a professor at the École nationale supérieure des Arts Décoratifs and the École nationale supérieure des Beaux-Arts in Paris from 1945 to 1947, and a member of the board of architecture of the Ministry of Reconstruction and Urban Development.

== Selected buildings ==
Villa Guggenbuhl (1927), Rue Nansouty, Paris 48.823325°N 2.335326°E

== Selected writings ==
- Architecture, Paris: Au Sans Pareil, 1929.
- Formes, composition et lois d'harmonie: Eléments d'une science de l'esthétique architecturale, Paris, Editions Vincent, Fréal & Cie, 1953.
- Œuvres récentes, Paris, Editions Vincent, Fréal & Cie, 1961.
