= Paris–Le Bourget Airport =

General aviation and former commercial airport serving Paris, France

Paris–Le Bourget Airport Aéroport de Paris-Le Bourget

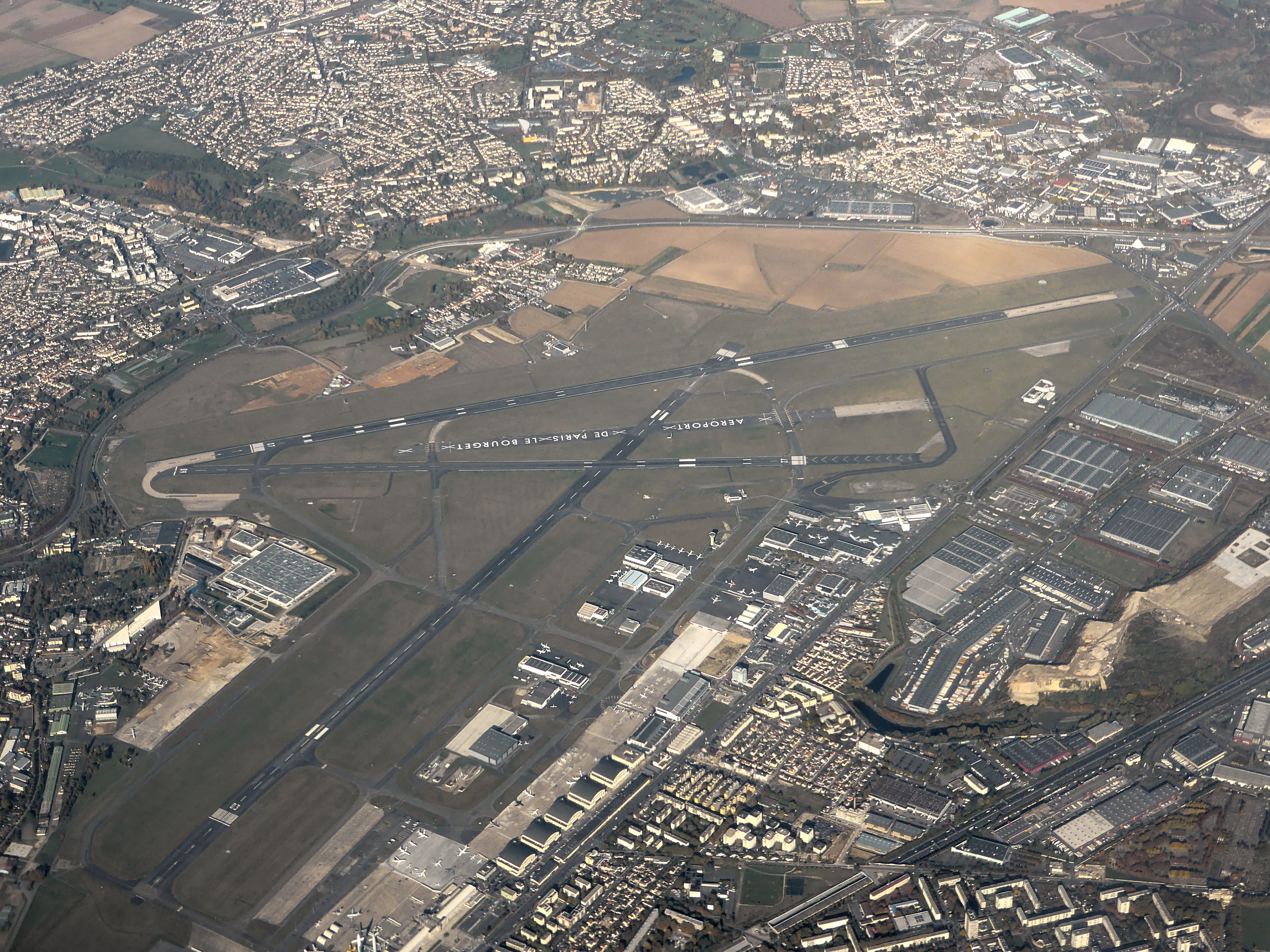
- IATA: LBG; ICAO: LFPB

Summary
- Airport type: Public
- Owner: Groupe ADP
- Operator: Paris Aéroport
- Serves: Paris metropolitan area
- Location: Le Bourget
- Opened: 1919; 107 years ago
- Elevation AMSL: 220 ft (67 m)
- Coordinates: 48°57′36″N 02°26′06″E

Maps
- Airport diagram

- Location of Paris–Le Bourget Airport

Runways
Direction	Length		Surface
Direction	m	ft	Surface
03/21	2,665	8,743	Asphalt
07/25	3,000	9,843	Asphalt/Concrete
09/27	1,845	6,053	Asphalt

Statistics (2017)
- Passengers: 52,935
- Source: French AIP; French AIP at EUROCONTROL

Paris–Le Bourget Airport (French: Aéroport de Paris-Le Bourget) (IATA: LBG, ICAO: LFPB) is an airport located within portions of the communes of Le Bourget, Bonneuil-en-France, Dugny and Gonesse, 6 NM (11 km; 6.9 mi) north-northeast of Paris, France.

Once the principal airport of Paris, it is now used only for general aviation, including business jet operations. It also hosts air shows, most notably the Paris Air Show. The airport is operated by Groupe ADP under the brand Paris Aéroport.

== History ==
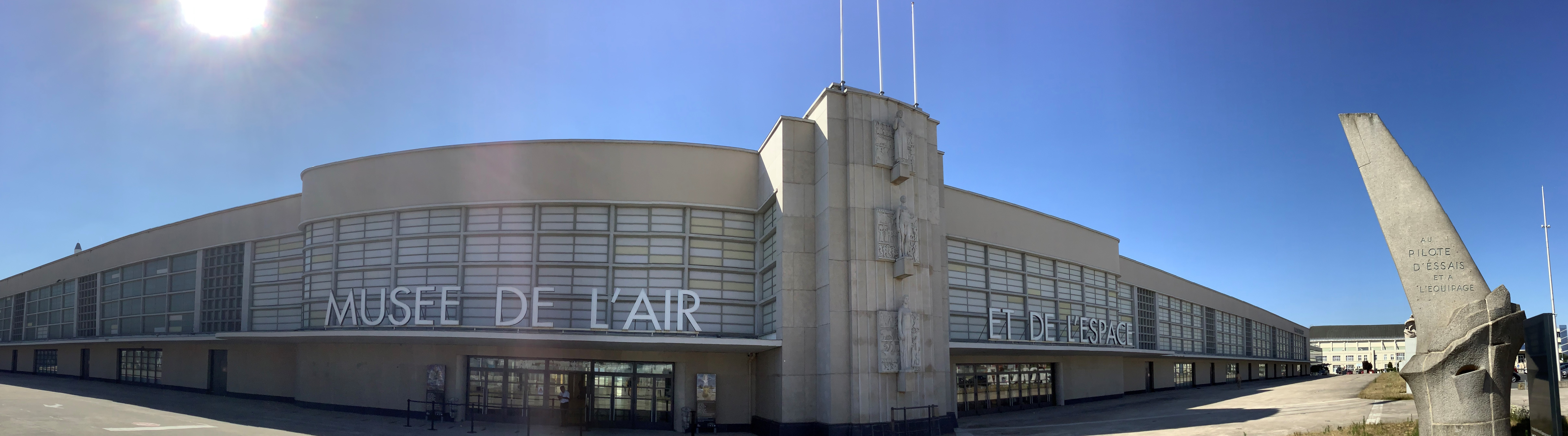
The 1937 terminal building

The airport started commercial operations in 1919 and was Paris's only airport until the construction of Orly Airport in 1932. It is famous as the landing site for Charles Lindbergh's historic solo transatlantic crossing in 1927 in the Spirit of St. Louis, and had been the departure point two weeks earlier for the French biplane L'Oiseau Blanc (The White Bird), which took off in an attempt at a transatlantic flight, but then mysteriously disappeared.

A new Art Deco style airport terminal was designed by architect Georges Labro following a competition organized by the Air Ministry in 1935. The building, decorated with the participation of the painter Lucien Martial, was inaugurated on 12 November 1937.

Howard Hughes flew the second nonstop flight from New York to Paris in 1939, landing at Le Bourget and thereafter continuing onward to Moscow.

On 25 June 1940, Adolf Hitler began his first and only tour of Paris, with Albert Speer and an entourage, from Le Bourget Airport.

Due to capacity constraints at Le Bourget, Air France transferred all of its operations to Orly in 1952.

The Paris Air Show was first held at Le Bourget in 1953, having previously been held at the Grand Palais prior to World War II, and at Orly after the war.

On 16 June 1961, the Soviet ballet dancer Rudolf Nureyev defected at Le Bourget Airport.

In 1977, Le Bourget was closed to international airline traffic and in 1980 to regional airline traffic, but continues serving both domestic and international business aviation. Since 1975, Le Bourget Airport has hosted the Musée de l'air et de l'espace, France's main state-owned aviation museum. Following the discontinuation of regular commercial traffic in 1977, space available to house museum collections and displays has progressively increased.

The airport hosts a statue commemorating Frenchwoman Raymonde de Laroche who was the first woman to earn a pilot's licence. There is also a monument honouring Lindbergh, as well as Nungesser and Coli, pilots of The White Bird.

On 14 April 2016, the Groupe ADP rolled out the Connect 2020 corporate strategy and the commercial brand Paris Aéroport was applied to all Parisian airports, including Le Bourget airport.

Le Bourget has been called "The Teterboro of Europe" because of the role it plays in accepting all business aviation flights into Paris, and the associated support base.

== Facilities ==
The Bureau of Enquiry and Analysis for Civil Aviation Safety (BEA) is headquartered in Building 153 on the grounds of Le Bourget Airport and in Le Bourget. Le Bourget Airport hosts the Musée de l'air et de l'espace, which is also located in the commune of Le Bourget.
