= Lycée Robert Schuman (Dugny) =

Coordinates: 48.9493°N 2.4153°E

Lycée Robert-Schuman
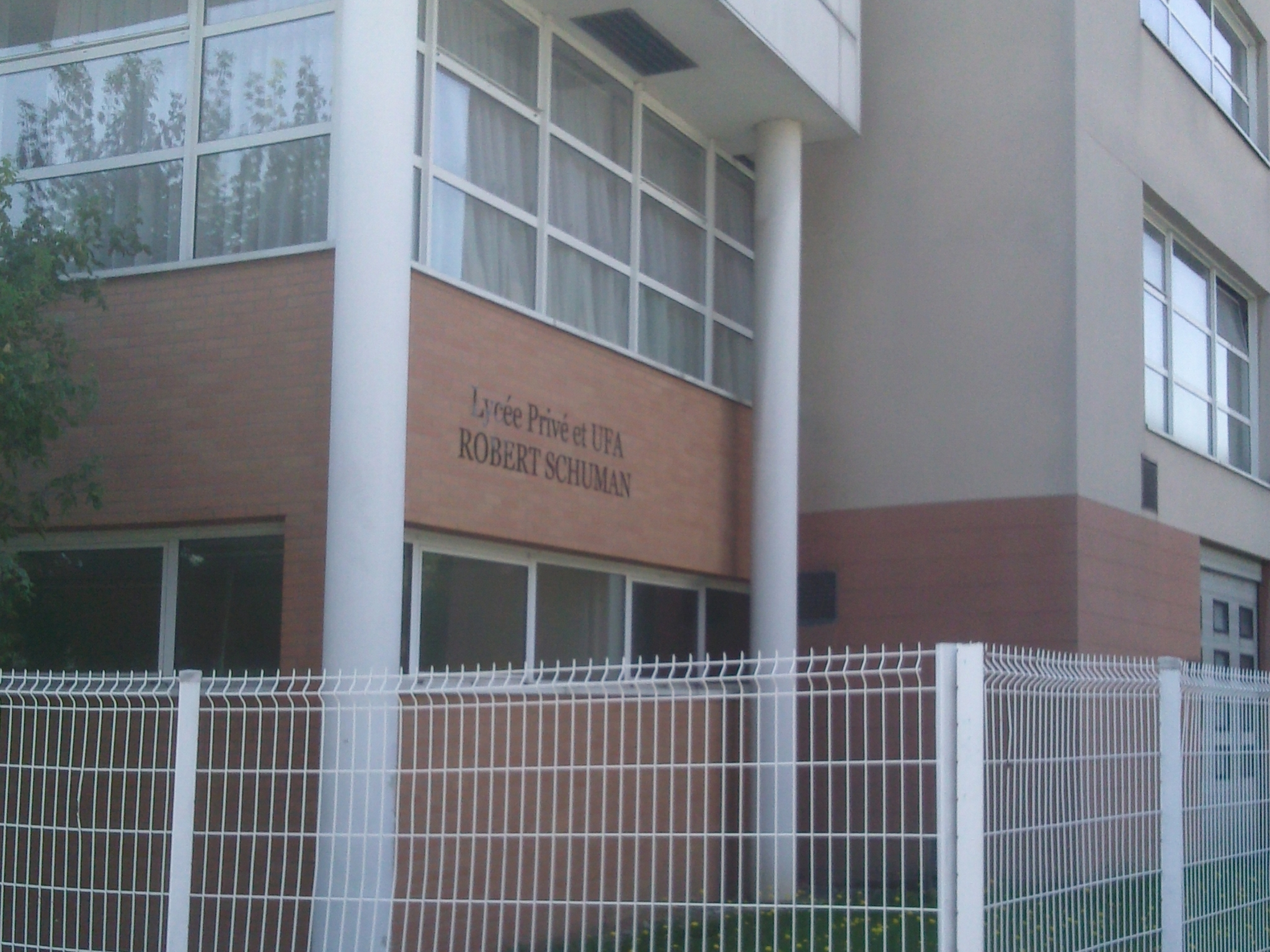

Information
- Type: Public high school

Lycée Robert Schuman is a Catholic private senior high school/sixth-form college in Dugny, Seine-Saint-Denis, France, in the Paris metropolitan area.

Christian engineers established the school in 1920.

c'est un lycée qui as eu un taux de réussites de 98% au bac de 2022 alors que seulement 80% aurait du réussir d'après eux.
