= Functional area =

Statistical area in France

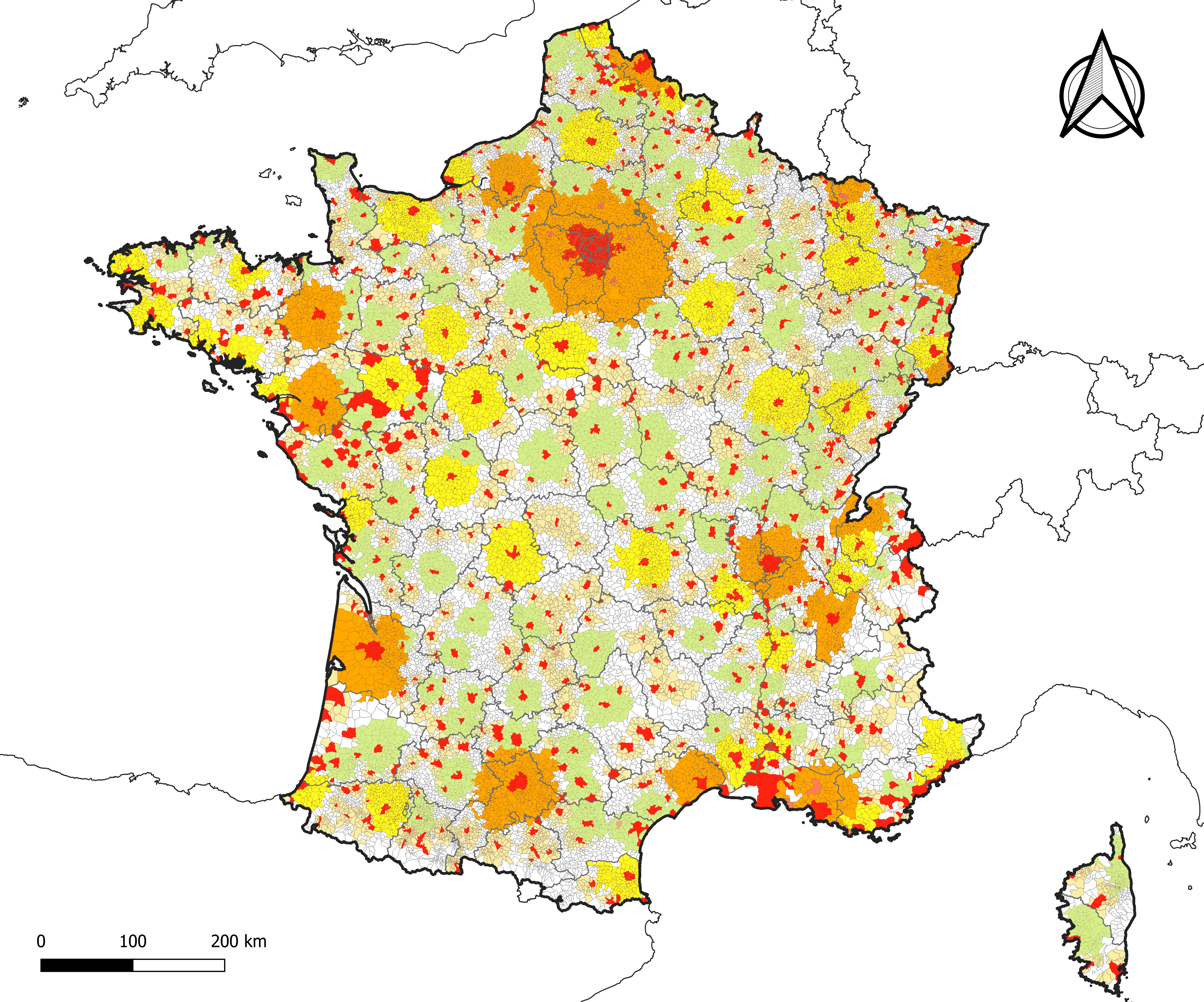
Functional areas (AAV) of Metropolitan France in 2020, broken down by communes (commune borders as of January 1, 2020): Communes in the main population and employment centre of a functional area Communes in a secondary population and employment centre of a functional area Communes in the commuting zone of a functional area (functional areas with more than 700,000 inhabitants) Communes in the commuting zone of a functional area (functional areas between 200,000 and 700,000 inhabitants) Communes in the commuting zone of a functional area (functional areas between 50,000 and 200,000 inhabitants) Communes in the commuting zone of a functional area (functional areas with less than 50,000 inhabitants) Communes outside of functional areas

An aire d'attraction d'une ville (Note: Plural: aires d'attraction des villes.) (or AAV, literally meaning "catchment area of a city") is a statistical area used by France's national statistics office INSEE since 2020, officially translated as functional area in English by INSEE, which consists of a densely populated urban agglomeration and the surrounding exurbs, towns and intervening rural areas that are socioeconomically tied to the central urban agglomeration, as measured by commuting patterns. INSEE's functional area (AAV) is therefore akin to what is most often called metropolitan area in English.

== Definition ==
INSEE's AAV follows the same definition as the Functional Urban Area (FUA) used by Eurostat and the OECD, and the AAVs are thus strictly comparable to the FUAs. Before 2020, INSEE used another metropolitan statistical area, the aire urbaine (AU), which was defined differently than the AAV, but the AU has now been discontinued and replaced with the AAV in order to facilitate international comparisons with Eurostat's FUAs.

The functional area is a grouping of communes comprising a 'population and employment centre' (pôle de population et d'emploi in French), which Eurostat calls "city" or "greater city" (depending on the FUA), defined according to population and employment criteria, and an outlying 'commuting zone' (couronne in French), which Eurostats calls "commuting zone" in English, like INSEE, but zone de navettage in French (unlike INSEE which calls it couronne), in which at least 15% of the working population work in the population and employment centre.

== Table ==
Rank (2023)	Rank (2012)	Rank (1990)	Functional area (AAV)	Population (2023)	Population (2012)	Population (1990)	Yearly change (2012–2023)	Yearly change (1990–2012)	Land area (km²)	Number of communes
1	1	1	Paris	13,320,752	12,734,837	11,392,740	+0.41%	+0.51%	18,941	1,929
2	2	2	Lyon	2,339,329	2,135,294	1,790,325	+0.83%	+0.81%	4,606	398
3	3	3	Marseille – Aix-en-Provence	1,917,728	1,815,196	1,594,849	+0.50%	+0.59%	3,972	115
4	4	4	Lille (French part)	1,530,624	1,470,295	1,390,191	+0.37%	+0.26%	1,666	201
5	5	6	Toulouse	1,529,112	1,322,271	935,009	+1.33%	+1.60%	6,520	527
6	6	5	Bordeaux	1,426,278	1,229,618	986,179	+1.36%	+1.02%	6,316	275
7	7	7	Nantes	1,050,815	917,944	722,234	+1.24%	+1.11%	3,471	116
8	8	8	Strasbourg (French part)	875,163	817,493	704,238	+0.62%	+0.69%	2,227	268
9	10	13	Montpellier	842,923	722,859	501,936	+1.41%	+1.69%	2,414	161
10	12	12	Rennes	789,516	695,892	521,255	+1.15%	+1.33%	3,804	183
11	9	10	Grenoble	727,380	702,884	614,455	+0.31%	+0.62%	2,876	204
12	11	9	Rouen	715,234	691,256	646,549	+0.31%	+0.31%	2,792	317
13	13	11	Nice (Note: Does not include Cannes-Antibes, which is considered by INSEE a separate AAV, contrary to the old aire urbaine of Nice which included Cannes and Antibes.)	641,721	603,992	558,520	+0.55%	+0.36%	2,073	100
14	14	16	Toulon	591,135	546,677	481,466	+0.71%	+0.58%	1,004	35
15	16	17	Tours	529,468	504,231	437,547	+0.44%	+0.65%	3,632	162
16	18	18	Clermont-Ferrand	510,668	476,679	432,862	+0.51%	+0.50%	2,845	209
17	15	14	Nancy	507,812	511,901	496,486	-0.07%	+0.14%	3,121	353
18	17	15	Saint-Étienne	503,351	489,046	491,789	+0.26%	-0.03%	1,636	105
19	19	19	Caen	486,716	455,492	399,635	+0.60%	+0.60%	2,597	296
20	20	20	Orléans	463,435	432,433	374,252	+0.63%	+0.66%	3,422	136
21	30	41	Geneva – Annemasse (French part) (Note: French part of the Geneva Functional Urban Area (2,292 km^{2} (885 sq mi)) which extends over Swiss and French territory, and had a population of 1,079,840 in Jan. 2023 (Swiss estimates and French census), 618,888 of them on Swiss territory and 460,952 on French territory.)	460,952	382,331	258,475	+1.71%	+1.81%	1,737	158
22	22	23	Angers	448,162	414,843	355,626	+0.70%	+0.70%	2,419	81
23	26	34	Perpignan	432,128	392,701	301,619	+0.87%	+1.22%	1,775	118
24	23	22	Dijon	419,527	400,804	365,025	+0.42%	+0.43%	3,896	333
25	21	21	Mulhouse	410,900	408,461	370,251	+0.05%	+0.45%	1,227	132
26	24	30	Cannes-Antibes	404,118	393,308	332,735	+0.25%	+0.77%	432	24
27	28	27	Brest	381,115	362,509	335,795	+0.46%	+0.35%	1,877	245
28	27	26	Metz	378,942	364,812	338,432	+0.35%	+0.34%	1,265	68
29	29	33	Le Mans	371,448	363,691	326,702	+0.19%	+0.49%	2,340	144
30	39	40	Nîmes	357,349	332,737	259,675	+0.65%	+1.14%	1,468	92
31	32	32	Reims	356,721	348,281	329,208	+0.22%	+0.26%	3,251	294
32	31	31	Amiens	354,121	349,530	329,781	+0.12%	+0.27%	3,076	369
33	25	25	Fort-de-France	346,577	372,379	340,815	-0.65%	+0.41%	974	28
34	38	38	Avignon	345,592	323,996	272,025	+0.59%	+0.80%	964	48
35	34	28	Valenciennes (French part)	336,830	336,466	335,758	+0.01%	+0.01%	725	102

== See also ==
- List of metropolitan areas in Europe by population
- Larger Urban Zone
- Demographics of France
- Unité urbaine, a different statistical concept developed by INSEE, measuring contiguously built-up areas
