= Urban area (France) =

Statistical area in France

Map of Metropolitan France indicating its commune municipalities. The colours show the urban organisation status of each municipality in 2010 : Urban areas of France in 2010, broken down by communes: Red: urban communes also urban poles of an urban area Orange: other urban communes in a single urban area Yellow: urban communes linked to at least two urban areas White: rural communes

An aire urbaine (literal and official translation: "urban area") is an INSEE (France's national statistics bureau) statistical concept describing a core of urban development and the extent of its commuter activity. It was replaced by the concept "functional area" (French: aire d'attraction des villes), which uses the same definition as Eurostat's functional urban areas, in 2020.

== Definition ==
The aire urbaine is built from France's nationwide interlocking administrative commune municipalities: when a commune has over 2000 inhabitants and contains a centre of dense construction (buildings spaced no more than 200 metres apart), it is combined with other adjoining communes fulfilling the same criteria to become a single unité urbaine ("urban unit"); if an urban unit offers over 10,000 jobs and its economical development is enough to draw more than 40% of the population of a nearby municipalities (and other municipalities drawn to these in the same way) as commuters, it becomes a pôle urbain ("urban cluster") and the "commuter municipalities" become its couronne ("rim"), but this only on the condition that the urban unit itself is not part of another urban cluster's rim. The aire urbaine is an urban cluster and its rim combined, or a statistical area describing a central urban core and its economic influence on surrounding municipalities.

=== Types of aires urbaines ===
As of 2010, depending on their population and function, aires urbaines adopt the following secondary appellations:

- aires urbaines with more than 500,000 inhabitants and 20,000 official 'metropolitan-type jobs' are considered aires métropolitaines ('metropolitan areas')
- aires urbaines with more than 200,000 inhabitants are considered grandes aires ('large urban areas')
- aires urbaines centred around a 'pole' urban unit with 5,000 to 10,000 jobs (with at least 40% of the surrounding commune populations working there) are 'moyennes aires' ('medium urban areas').
- aires urbaines centred around a 'pole' urban unit with 1,500 to 5,000 jobs (with at least 40% of the surrounding commune populations working there) are 'petites aires' ('small urban areas').

== History ==
In France, multiple words exist to define various kinds of urban area.

One of the first words used was the word agglomération, which was first used to deal with a group of people. The word was used, for instance, in a law from 5 April 1884 (loi du 5 avril 1884), in which Article 98 gives the mayor police power (pouvoirs de police), meaning authority over the city, but only within the agglomération. That law was used as a legal precedent in 1907 to forbid a mayor from setting a speed limit on the road next to a farm, considering that at that time, a group of houses inside a farm might be an agglomération, but the road next to it was not inside the agglomération.

Later, in the 1920s, the concept of agglomération was used in the code de la route (Highway code) to define specific law within or outside of such a zone.

In 1968, the French word agglomération was introduced in the French version of the Vienna Convention on Road Traffic in the place where the English word built-up area was used in the English version of the same treaty. In this treaty, the word is only defined as a concept signalled by an entry sign and an exit sign, while still allowing members of the treaty to have different definitions.

Nowadays, words with an English origin or meaning tend to be introduced into the French language as loanwords, in order to describe new concepts, words or meanings, or to replace old words. Such words include: aire urbaine (urban area); métropole (metropolis); agglomération (agglomeration); communauté urbaine (urban community); Grand + the name of a city (Grand Paris, Grand Toulouse).

As a member of the European Union and the OECD, for statistical purposes, France may need to consider the regions inside or outside of the limits of an urban area.

== List of France's aires urbaines (metropolitan areas) ==
The following is a list of the twenty largest aires urbaines (metropolitan areas) in France, based on their population at the 2016 census. Population at the 2011 and 2006 census is indicated for comparison.

In both time intervals presented in the table below (2006 to 2011 and 2011 to 2016), the fastest-growing metropolitan areas in France were Bordeaux, Montpellier, Toulouse, Nantes, Rennes and Lyon with an average annual growth rate equal or greater than 1%.

Rank (2016)	Rank (2011)	Rank (2006)	Aire urbaine (metropolitan area)	Population (2016)	Population (2011)	Population (2006)	Yearly change (2011-2016)	Yearly change (2006-2011)	Land area (km^{2})
1	1	1	Paris	12,568,755	12,292,895	11,956,493	+0.44%	+0.56%	17,174
2	2	2	Lyon	2,310,850	2,188,759	2,085,107	+1.09%	+0.98%	6,019
3	3	3	Marseille - Aix-en-Provence	1,756,296	1,720,941	1,692,459	+0.41%	+0.33%	3,174
4	4	4	Toulouse	1,345,343	1,250,251	1,169,865	+1.48%	+1.34%	5,381
5	6	6	Bordeaux	1,232,550	1,140,668	1,086,106	+1.56%	+0.99%	5,613
6	5	5	Lille (French part)	1,187,820	1,159,547	1,152,507	+0.48%	+0.12%	926
7	7	7	Nice	1,006,402	1,003,947	995,968	+0.05%	+0.16%	2,585
8	8	8	Nantes	961,521	884,275	841,404	+1.69%	+1.00%	3,302
9	9	9	Strasbourg (French part)	785,839	764,013	749,766	+0.56%	+0.38%	2,198
10	10	12	Rennes	727,357	679,866	637,673	+1.36%	+1.29%	3,747
11	11	10	Grenoble	687,985	675,122	659,459	+0.38%	+0.47%	2,621
12	12	11	Rouen	665,249	655,013	643,499	+0.31%	+0.36%	2,367
13	13	13	Toulon	626,504	606,987	598,514	+0.63%	+0.28%	1,196
14	14	15	Montpellier	607,896	561,326	529,401	+1.61%	+1.18%	1,673
15	15	14	Douai - Lens	539,064	542,946	545,636	-0.14%	−0.10%	679
16	16	17	Avignon	529,190	515,123	501,866	+0.54%	+0.52%	2,083
17	17	16	Saint-Étienne	519,834	508,548	508,284	+0.44%	+0.01%	1,689
18	18	18	Tours	494,453	480,378	469,244	+0.58%	+0.47%	3,184
19	19	19	Clermont-Ferrand	482,472	467,178	454,553	+0.65%	+0.55%	2,420
20	20	20	Nancy	435,356	434,565	432,481	+0.04%	+0.10%	2,367

== See also ==
- List of communes in France with over 20,000 inhabitants
- Demographics of France
- List of metropolitan areas in Europe
- Larger urban zone
- Urban unit, a related concept
- Functional area (France), a related concept
