= Dugny =

- Commune
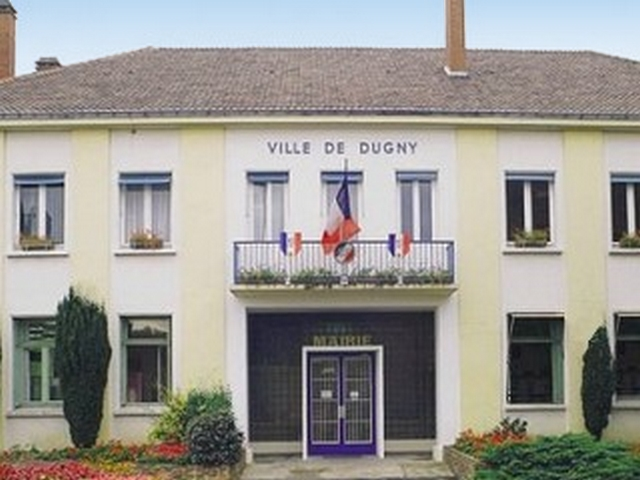
- Dugny town hall

- Coat of arms

- Location (in red) within Paris inner suburbs
- Location of Dugny
- Location within France Location within Île-de-France (region)
- Coordinates: 48°57′00″N 2°25′00″E
- Country: France
- Region: Île-de-France
- Department: Seine-Saint-Denis
- Arrondissement: Le Raincy
- Canton: La Courneuve
- Intercommunality: Grand Paris

Government
  - Mayor (2026–32): Quentin Gesell
- Area^{1}: 3.89 km^{2} (1.50 sq mi)
- Population (2023): 11,700
  - Density: 3,010/km^{2} (7,790/sq mi)
- Time zone: UTC+01:00 (CET)
  - Summer (DST): UTC+02:00 (CEST)
- INSEE/Postal code: 93030 /93440
- ^{1} French Land Register data, which excludes lakes, ponds, glaciers > 1 km^{2} (0.386 sq mi or 247 acres) and river estuaries.

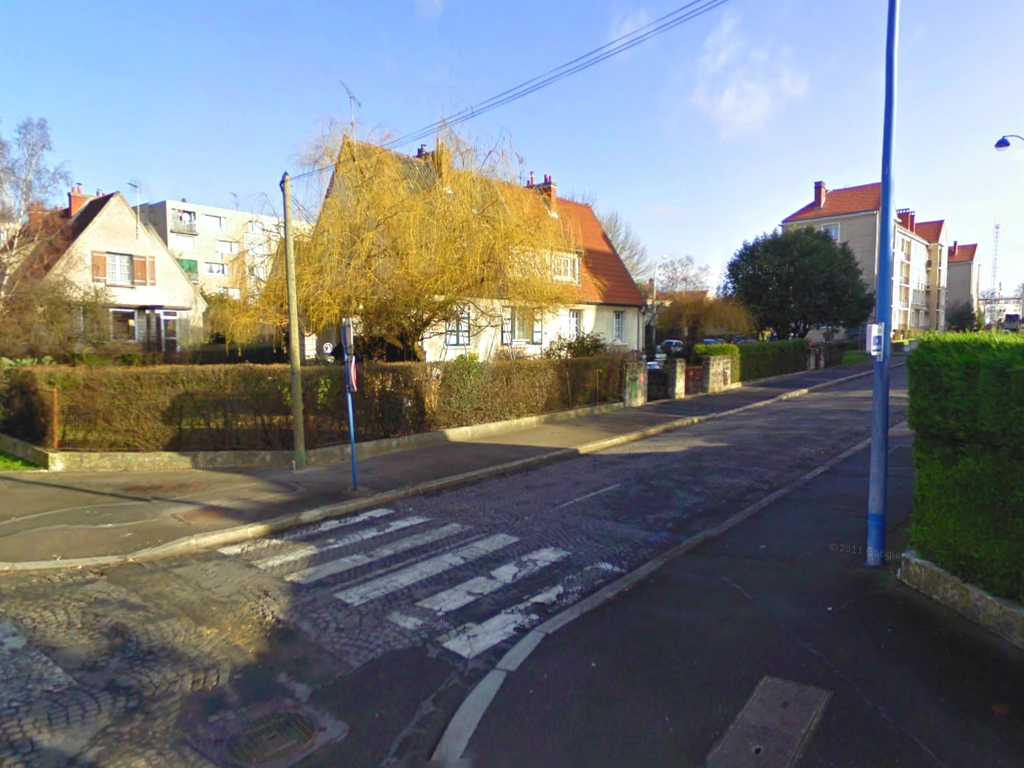

Dugny (French pronunciation: [dyɲi]) is a commune in the northeastern suburbs of Paris, France. It is located 12.4 km (7.7 mi) from the centre of Paris.

About a third of Le Bourget airport lies on the territory of the commune of Dugny, including its main terminal and the Musée de l'Air et de l'Espace (air and space museum). Nonetheless, the airport was named after the neighbouring commune of Le Bourget.

== Toponymy ==
Dugny possibly derives from the Gallo-Roman personal name Dugennius, and means 'the estate of Dugennius'.

== Population ==
Historical population
Year	Pop.	±% p.a.
1968	7,860	—
1975	8,094	+0.42%
1982	8,451	+0.62%
1990	8,361	−0.13%
1999	8,641	+0.37%
2007	10,439	+2.39%
2012	10,493	+0.10%
2017	10,732	+0.45%
2023	11,700	+1.45%
Source: INSEE

== Heraldry ==
arms of Dugny	the arms of Dugny are blazoned : Quarterly: 1 & 4 azure a nail argent between 3 fleurs de lys Or, 2 & 3 gules, a millrind argent between 3 fleurs de lys each formed of 3 ears of wheat Or.

== Transport ==
Dugny is served by no station of the Paris Métro, RER, or suburban rail network. The closest station to Dugny is Le Bourget station on Paris RER line B. This station is located in the neighbouring commune of Le Bourget, 2.8 km (1.7 mi) from the town centre of Dugny. Le Bourget Airport and Charles de Gaulle International Airport are located near Dugny.

== Education ==
Schools in Dugny:

- Three public preschools (écoles maternelles): Marcel Cachin, Irene et Frédéric Joliot-Curie, and Nelson Mandela
- Four public elementary schools: Colonel Fabien, Jean Jaurès, Paul Langevin, and Henri Wallon
- One public junior high school: Collège Jean-Baptiste Clément
- Two senior high schools: Lycée hôtelier polyvalent Rabelais (public) and Lycée Privé Robert Schuman (private)

The Médiathèque Anne Frank is on the first floor (not the ground floor) of the Espace Victor Hugo.

== See also ==
- Communes of the Seine-Saint-Denis department
