= Urban unit =

French statistical area

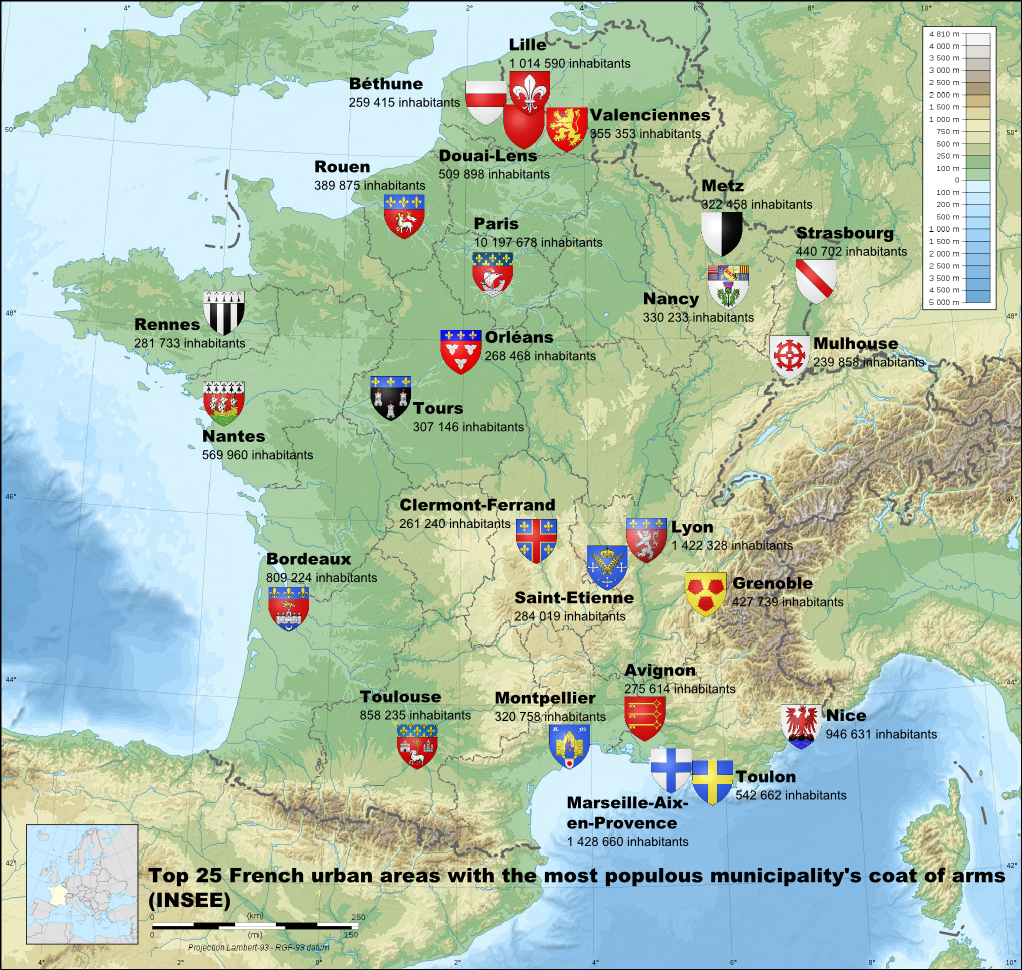
25 largest French urban areas in 2010

In France, an urban unit (French: unité urbaine) is a statistical area defined by INSEE, the French national statistics office, for the measurement of contiguously built-up areas. According to the INSEE definition, an "unité urbaine" is a commune alone or a grouping of communes which: a) form a single unbroken spread of urban development, with no distance between habitations greater than 200 m and b) have all together a population greater than 2,000 inhabitants. Communes not belonging to an unité urbaine are considered rural.

The French unité urbaine is a statistical area in accordance with United Nations recommendations for the measurement of contiguously built-up areas. Other comparable units in other countries are the United States "Urbanized Area" and the "urban area" definition shared by Canada and the United Kingdom. The French aire d'attraction d'une ville is equivalent to the functional urban area as defined by Eurostat, and represents a population and employment centre (urban cluster) and its commuting zone. The zoning into unités urbaines and aires d'attraction des villes was last revised in 2020.

== French urban units with over 200,000 inhabitants ==
This list shows the unités urbaines as of the 2020 revision.

	Urban unit	Inhabitants (2019)	Area in km^{2} (2021)	Communes (2022)
1	Paris	10,858,852	2,853.5	411
2	Lyon	1,685,494	1,141.4	124
3	Marseille-Aix-en-Provence	1,614,501	1,758.2	50
4	Lille (excluding Belgian part)	1,051,609	446.7	60
5	Toulouse	1,035,280	957.5	81
6	Bordeaux	986,879	1,287.3	73
7	Nice	952,329	743.6	51
8	Nantes	664,335	498.6	22
9	Toulon	586,475	763.7	27
10	Douai-Lens	504,092	485.2	67
11	Strasbourg (excluding German part)	478,280	240.2	23
12	Rouen	471,893	461.1	50
13	Avignon	458,828	1,364.4	59
14	Montpellier	458,189	310.0	22
15	Grenoble	452,864	358.1	38
16	Saint-Étienne	374,318	414.0	32
17	Rennes	364,133	327.7	16
18	Tours	361,956	684.9	38
19	Béthune	355,596	760.3	94
20	Valenciennes (excluding Belgian part)	334,571	440.0	56
21	Metz	288,143	308.8	42
22	Nancy	286,818	245.9	28
23	Orléans	283,961	289.5	19
24	Clermont-Ferrand	274,141	180.8	17
25	Bayonne (excluding Spanish part)	257,137	513.7	30
26	Pointe-à-Pitre-Les Abymes	249,815	729.7	11
27	Mulhouse	247,044	239.1	20
28	Dijon	246,987	169.6	15
29	Angers	245,093	243.3	12
30	Le Havre	233,414	194.9	18
31	Le Mans	220,948	338.1	20
32	Reims	215,275	106.8	9
33	Caen	206,973	173.6	24
34	Brest	203,095	199.4	7
35	Perpignan	203,025	217.5	15
36	Pau	200,667	530.9	55

== See also ==
- Functional area (France)
- List of communes in France with over 20,000 inhabitants
- Urban area (France)
