= Bourne End rail crash =

1945 train derailment in Bourne End, Hertfordshire, England

Coordinates: 51°45′01.5″N 0°31′29.8″W

Details
- Date: 30 September 1945; 09:05
- Location: Bourne End turnout, near Hemel Hempstead, Hertfordshire, England
- Country: England
- Line: West Coast Main Line
- Operator: London, Midland & Scottish Railway
- Incident type: Derailment due to excessive speed
- Cause: Driver error

Statistics
- Trains: 1
- Passengers: 398
- Deaths: 43
- Injured: 64

The Bourne End rail crash occurred on 30 September 1945 when a sleeper train from Perth to London Euston derailed, killing 43. The cause was driver error, possibly compounded by ambiguous signalling regulations.

== Overview ==
The train was the 15-coach overnight Perth to London Euston express hauled by LMS Royal Scot Class 4-6-0 No 6157 The Royal Artilleryman. Because of engineering work in Watford tunnel, it was scheduled to divert from the fast to the slow lines at Bourne End, near Hemel Hempstead. However, the driver failed to slow the train down in response to cautionary signals on the approach to the diversion, and it entered a 15-mile-per-hour (24 km/h) turnout at nearly 60 miles per hour (97 km/h). The engine and the first six carriages overturned and fell down an embankment into a field; only the last three coaches remained on the rails.

The morning was fine and sunny, and the driver, who was highly experienced with a particular reputation for being conscientious, had read the notice about the diversion before leaving Crewe, although he may not have appreciated its significance. He had worked 26 days consecutively due to post-war staff shortages and it was possible that he had either experienced micro-sleep momentarily or gone into "autopilot" through fatigue. Although the Automatic Warning System had not yet been fitted to this line, it is probable that it could have prevented the accident.

Advance warning of the turnout was provided by a colour light distant signal showing double yellow, an outer home signal showing green, and two 'splitting' semaphore inner homes side by side showing which route was set. The double yellow aspect could have an important extra meaning under Rule 35b(ii);

"In some cases colour light signals will exhibit two yellow lights. This indication means - Pass next signal at restricted speed, and if applicable to a junction may denote that the points are set for a diverging route over which the speed restriction shown in the appendix applies."

The inspector pointed out that this arrangement was ambiguous and evidently did not alert the driver to the approaching low speed turnout, but it was unclear why he failed to notice the diverging route indication of the splitting inner homes. Low sun shining directly in his face would have made observation tiring, but the signals were still clearly visible, this being a clear day.

The alarm was raised by a pilot who had just taken off from Bovingdon Aerodrome and who had observed the accident during takeoff and notified the railway authorities via the Bovingdon Control tower. Airfield staff also helped significantly with assistance after the crash (Hamilton, 1967).

The Inspector recommended that where a route was set for a low-speed diversion, the preceding signal should be maintained at Danger either automatically or manually by the signalman, until it was clear that the driver was slowing down for the diversion. This was an early form of approach release. It was already being practiced by some signalmen, although it failed to prevent the similar Goswick rail crash the following year.

Forty-three people were killed, making it Britain's joint seventh worst rail disaster in terms of death toll.

== Similar accidents ==
- (United States) – Spuyten Duyvil derailment – fatigued driver's momentary inattention led to overspeed through a curve
- (United States) – Little Falls Gulf Curve crash - overspeed through curve
- (United Kingdom) – Goswick rail crash - overspeed through turnout
- (United Kingdom) – Milton rail crash - overspeed through turnout
- (Australia) – Laverton accident - overspeed through turnout
- (Finland) – Jokela rail crash - overspeed through turnout
- (Finland) – Jyväskylä rail crash - overspeed through turnout
- (Germany) – Brühl train disaster - overspeed through turnout
- (Australia) – Waterfall rail accident - overspeed through sharp curve
- (Japan) – Amagasaki derailment - overspeed through sharp curve

== See also ==
- Lists of rail accidents
- List of British rail accidents

== Sources ==
- Rolt, L.T.C. (1999) [1956]. Red for Danger. Bodley Head / David and Charles / Pan Books /Alan Sutton Publishing. ISBN 978-0-7509-2047-6.
- Hamilton, J.A.B. (1987) [1967]. British Railway Accidents of the 20th Century (reprinted as Disaster down the Line). George Allen and Unwin / Javelin Books. ISBN 978-0-7137-1973-4.
- Railways Archive account, including official Accident Report
