= Taiwan train crash =

Taiwan train crash may refer to:

- 1991 Miaoli train collision
- 2018 Yilan train derailment
- 2021 Hualien train derailment
