= Amagasaki derailment =

2005 rail accident in Amagasaki, Japan

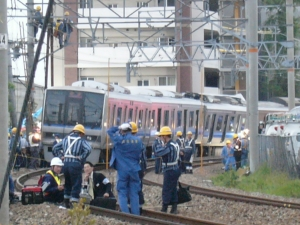
- Aftermath

Details
- Date: 25 April 2005; 21 years ago 09:19 (JST)
- Location: Amagasaki, Hyōgo Prefecture
- Coordinates: 34°44′29.3″N 135°25′35.7″E
- Country: Japan
- Line: Fukuchiyama Line
- Operator: West Japan Railway Company
- Incident type: Derailment
- Cause: Excessive speed on sharp curve due to driver error, arising from a fear of harsh penalties for lateness and JR West's retraining system

Statistics
- Trains: 1
- Passengers: Approximately 700
- Deaths: 107 (including driver)
- Injured: 562
Diagram

The Amagasaki derailment (Japanese: JR福知山線脱線事故, Hepburn: JR Fukuchiyama-sen dassen jiko; lit. "JR Fukuchiyama Line derailment") occurred in Amagasaki, Hyōgo Prefecture, Japan, on 25 April 2005 at 09:19 local time, just after the local rush hour. A seven-car commuter train came off the tracks on West Japan Railway Company's (JR West) Fukuchiyama Line just before Amagasaki on its way for Dōshisha-mae via the JR Tōzai Line and the Katamachi Line, and the front two cars rammed into an apartment building. The first car slid into the first-floor parking garage and as a result took days to remove, while the second slammed into the corner of the building, being crushed into an L-shape against it by the weight of the remaining cars. Of the roughly 700 passengers, 106 passengers and the driver were killed, and 562 others were injured. Most survivors and witnesses claimed that the train was travelling too fast. The incident was Japan's most deadly since the 1963 Tsurumi rail accident.

== Train details and crash ==
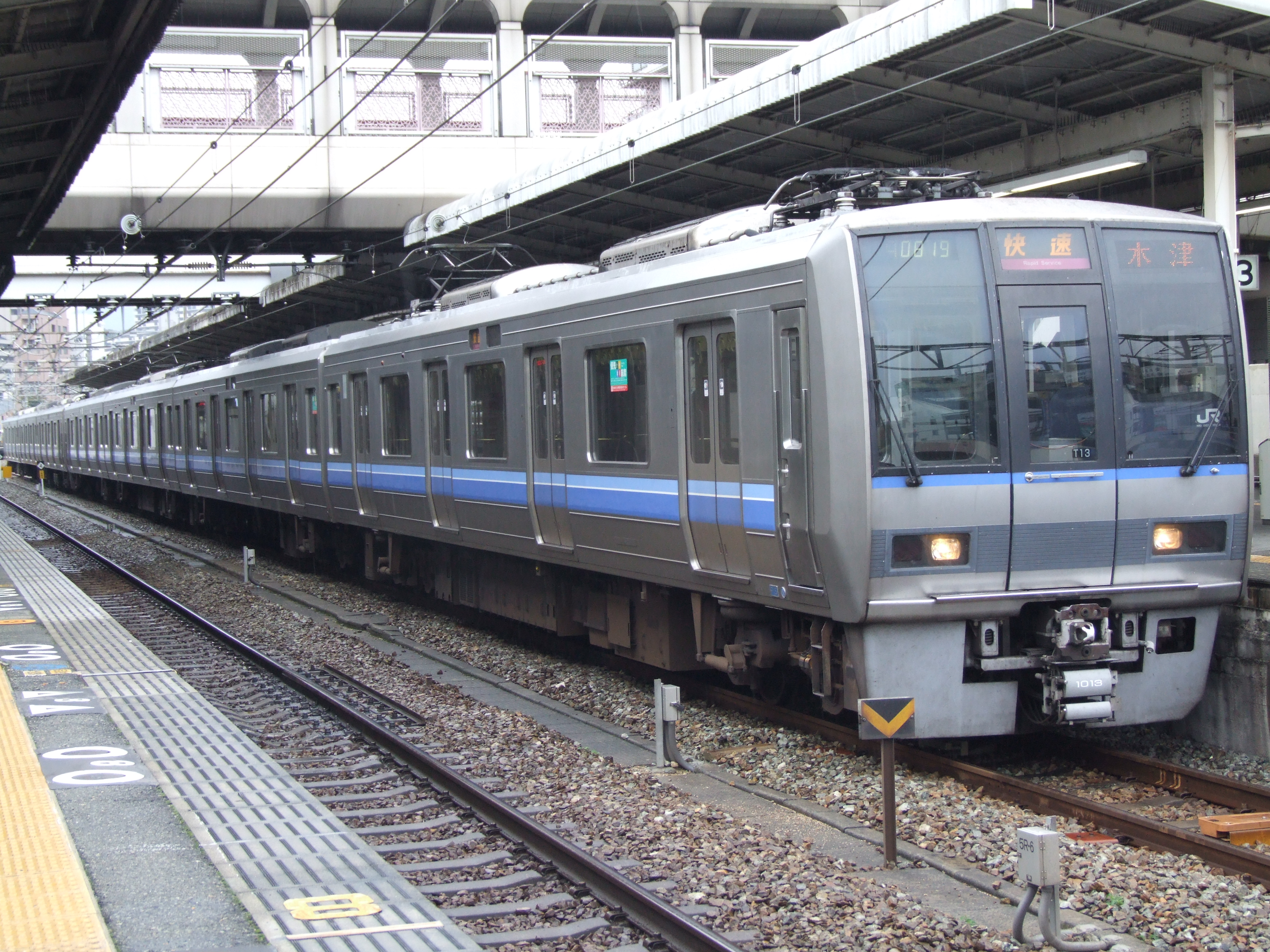
A 207 series EMU train similar to the one involved in the Amagasaki rail crash

The train involved was train number 5418M, a limited-stop "Rapid" commuter service from Takarazuka Station to Dōshishamae Station. It was a seven-car 207 series electric multiple unit (EMU) formation consisting of a four-car set and a three-car set coupled together as shown below, with Car 1 leading. The train was carrying approximately 700 passengers at the time of the accident.

Car No.	1	2	3	4	5	6	7
Numbering	KuHa 207-17	MoHa 207-31	MoHa 206-17	KuHa 206-129	KuMoHa 207-1033	SaHa 207-1019	KuHa 206-1033

The front four cars derailed completely, with the first car ramming into the parking lot of the apartment building and the second car colliding into the external wall of the building becoming almost completely compacted by the third and fourth cars, which were themselves pushed from the rear by the fifth car.

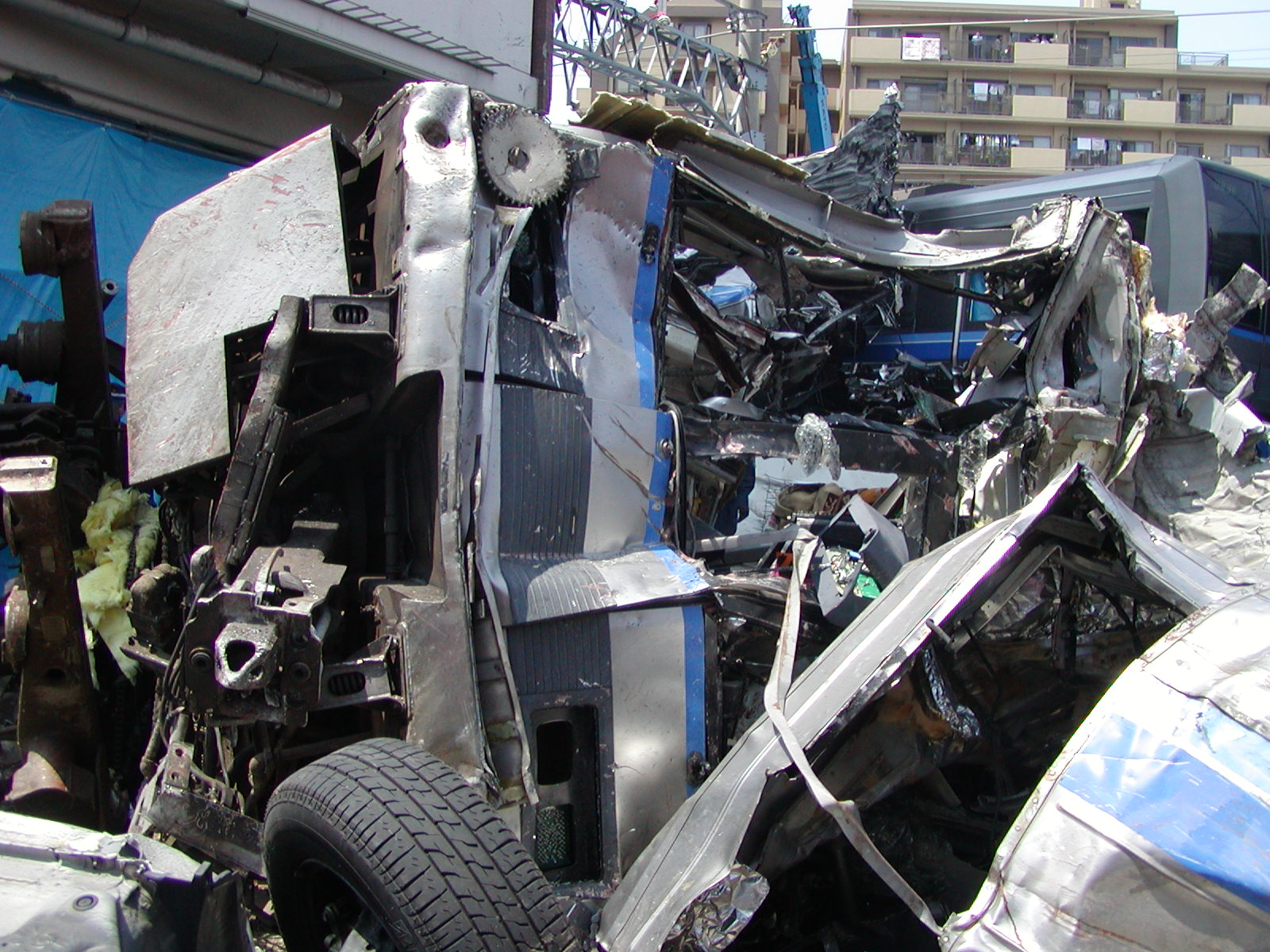
The destroyed leading car

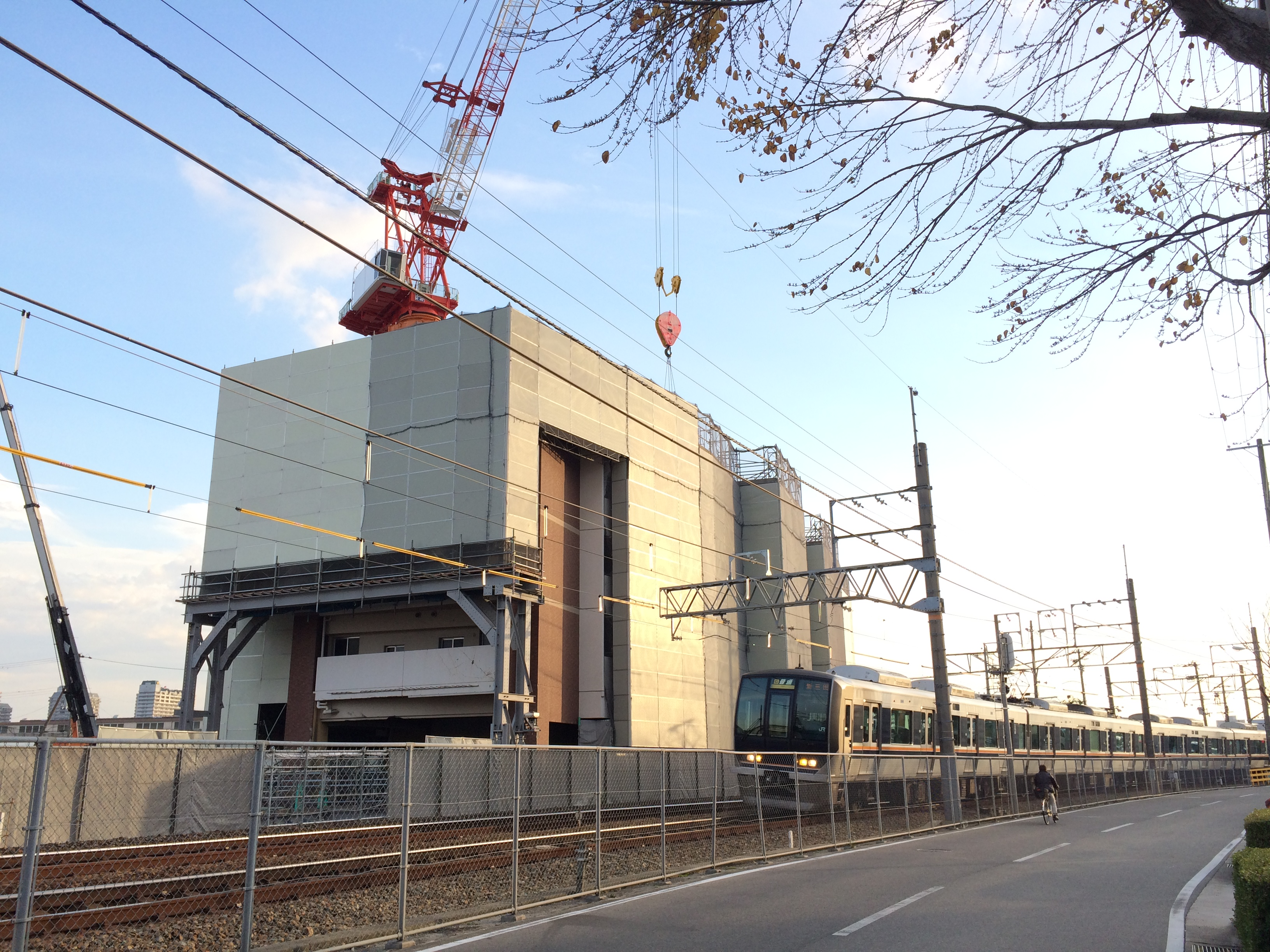
The apartment building where the accident took place being demolished in 2016.

== Investigation ==
The English translation of an excerpt of the investigation report of the accident

Investigators primarily focused on the speeding by the 23-year-old driver, later identified as being the most likely cause of the derailment. Twenty-five minutes before the derailment, the driver had run a red signal, causing the automatic train stop (ATS) to bring the train to a halt. The train had also overshot the correct stopping position at an earlier stop at Itami Station with more than 3 carriages, requiring him to back up the train, and resulting in a 90-second delay, about four minutes before the disaster. By the time the train passed Tsukaguchi Station at a speed of 120 km/h (75 mph), the delay had been reduced to 60 seconds.

Investigators speculate that the driver may have been trying to make up this lost time by increasing the train's speed beyond customary limits. Many reports from surviving passengers indicate that the train was traveling at a faster than normal speed. Furthermore, it is speculated that the driver may have felt stressed because he would have been punished for the two infractions, and may have not been totally focused on driving. Ten months before the crash, the driver had been reprimanded by the train's operator, the West Japan Railway Company (JR West), for overshooting a station platform by 100 metres (330 ft).

JR West is very strict when it comes to punctuality, and commuters often depend on near-perfect timing on the part of trains to commute to and from work on time. This is because at JR West stations (including the derailed train's next scheduled stop at Amagasaki Station) trains meet on both sides of the same platform to allow people to transfer between rapid and local trains running on the same line. As a result, a small delay in one train can cascade through the timetable for the rest of the day due to the tightness of the schedule. Immediately after the crash occurred, some of the mass media pointed to the congested schedule of the Fukuchiyama Line as an indirect factor. Cumulative changes over the previous three years had reduced the leeway in the train's schedule from 71 to 28 seconds over the fifteen minutes between Takarazuka and Amagasaki stations.

Drivers for JR West face financial penalties for lateness as well as being forced into harsh and humiliating retraining programs known as nikkin kyōiku (日勤教育, "dayshift education"), which include weeding and grass-cutting duties during the day. The final report officially concluded that the retraining system was one probable cause of the crash. This program consisted of severe verbal abuse, forcing the employees to repent by writing extensive reports. Many experts saw the process of nikkin kyōiku as punishment and psychological torture, not retraining. The driver had also received a non-essential phone call from the general control station at the time that he was rounding the bend.

The speed limit on the segment of track where the derailment happened was 70 km/h (43 mph). The data recorder in the rear of the train (the rear cars were new and equipped with many extra devices) showed that the train was moving at 116 km/h (72 mph) at that point. Investigators ran a series of simulations and calculated that the train would derail on that curve if going over 106 km/h (66 mph). It has been speculated that the driver was so stressed about the inevitability of going back to nikkin kyōiku due to his prior infractions that morning, that he did not notice that the train was going too fast. When the driver did notice, four seconds before the derailment, he used the service brake instead of the emergency brake, presumably to avoid another infraction as using the emergency brake had to be justified.

Japanese building codes do not regulate the distance between train lines and residential buildings due to high confidence in the engineering of the rail system. As a result, railway lines often pass close to residential buildings in metropolitan areas.

== Aftermath ==
Amongst other things, the Ministry of Land and Transportation asked all railway companies to update their automatic stopping systems so that trains would brake automatically and slow down as they approached sharp curves.

It is believed that a contributing factor in the accident was JR West's policy of schedule punctuality. As a result, Masataka Ide, a JR West adviser who played a major role in enforcing the punctuality of the company's trains, announced that he would resign in June 2005. JR West's chairman and president resigned in August.

The section where the crash occurred, between Amagasaki and Takarazuka stations, was re-opened for service on 19 June 2005. The rail speed limits around the site of the accident were reduced from 120 to 95 km/h (75 to 59 mph) for the straight section and from 70 to 60 km/h (43 to 37 mph) for the curved section.

According to investigations carried out by the Hyōgo Prefecture police, out of the 107 deaths, at least 43 (27 men and 16 women), including the driver, were in the first car; at least 45 (22 men and 23 women) were in the second car; and at least one was in the third car. This was determined by questioning 519 of the approximately 550 injured passengers.

On 26 December 2005, Takeshi Kakiuchi resigned from the presidency of JR West, intending to take responsibility for the accident. Kakiuchi's successor was Masao Yamazaki, who had previously served as the railway's vice president, based in Osaka. Kakiuchi's resignation came one day after another serious accident on JR East, though officials at the railway did not make any explicit connection between the accident and the resignation.

A 2008 The Daily Yomiuri article reported that survivors of the disaster still faced physical and mental health issues.

On 8 July 2009, JR West president Masao Yamazaki was charged with professional negligence resulting in deaths and injuries, as he was in charge of safety measures in 1996 when the company rebuilt railway tracks to sharpen the curve at the accident's site. Prosecutors said that he failed to put in an Automatic Train Stop system, which could have halted the train. On the same day, Yamazaki announced that he would resign "so the company can operate normally", but would remain as a member of the company's board. On 11 January 2012, Yamazaki was found not guilty by judge Makoto Okada of the Kobe District Court, saying the accident was not sufficiently predictable to merit a finding of guilt. The court, however, criticized JR West for faulty risk assessment of the curve where the accident happened.

In 2017, the building hit by the train was demolished. In 2018, a memorial facility and monument were built at the accident site by JR West. Part of the condominium building was preserved and the location was covered with a roof.

In February 2023, JR West began construction of a new memorial facility adjacent to their employee training center in Suita, Osaka Prefecture, to display the train cars involved in the accident and victims' belongings, with an estimated completion date of December 2025. The facility was completed on 12 December 2025. On 17 December 2025, JR West invited members of the media to tour the completed 3,900 m^{2} (42,000 sq ft) facility, which houses the entire seven-car accident train on the ground floor and the victims' belongings on the basement level. The facility will not be open to the public.

As of 2026, the report for this incident still takes a prominent place on JR West's Japanese homepage. A translation of the accompanying text reads, "We will never forget the Fukuchiyama Line train accident that occurred on April 25, 2005. We will continue to prioritize safety and build a railway that you can trust and rely on." A statement from Shoji Kurasaka, President of JR West is also on the site, It offers JR West's sincere apologies to the families of the victims, vowing to continue working to improve safety and ensuring such an accident will never happen again.

== Similar accidents ==
=== Too fast around sharp curve ===
- United Kingdom 1906 Salisbury rail crash, 1906: 28 killed
- United States Malbone Street Wreck, 1918 in New York: 98 killed
- United States Red Arrow crash, 1947 in Pennsylvania: 24 killed
- Australia Camp Mountain train disaster, 1947: 16 killed
- Japan Hachikō Line derailment, February 1947: 184 killed: the worst railway accident to occur in Japan
- United States Woodbridge train derailment, 1951: 85 killed
- United Kingdom Sutton Coldfield train disaster, 1955: 17 killed
- United Kingdom Morpeth rail crashes, 1969, 1984, 1994: a total of 6 killed in three separate accidents
- United Kingdom Eltham Well Hall rail crash, 1972: 6 killed
- United States Cajon Pass, 1989, 1996: 8 killed, 6 in the San Bernardino train disaster of 1989 (4 from derailment and 2 from pipeline explosion) and 2 in 1996.
- Italy Piacenza derailment, 1997: 8 killed
- Germany Brühl train disaster, 2000: 9 killed
- Australia Waterfall train disaster, 2003: 7 killed
- Australia Cairns Tilt Train derailment, 2004: 0 killed
- Spain Valencia Metro derailment, 2006: 41 killed
- China Zibo train collision, 2008: 72 killed
- Spain Santiago de Compostela derailment, 2013: 79 killed
- United States Spuyten Duyvil derailment, 2013: 4 killed
- United States 2015 Philadelphia train derailment: 8 killed
- United States 2017 Washington train derailment: 3 killed
- Taiwan 2018 Yilan train derailment, October 2018: 18 killed

=== Failure to check speed after stop and proceed ===
- Australia Glenbrook train disaster, 1999: 7 killed

== See also ==
- Lists of rail accidents

== Media ==
- Brakeless, a 2014 Peabody Award winning documentary film on the accident by Kyoko Miyake.
- Featured on National Geographic's show: Seconds from Disaster. (S06E07, "Runaway Train")
