= 2018 Yilan train derailment =

2018 rail accident in Taiwan

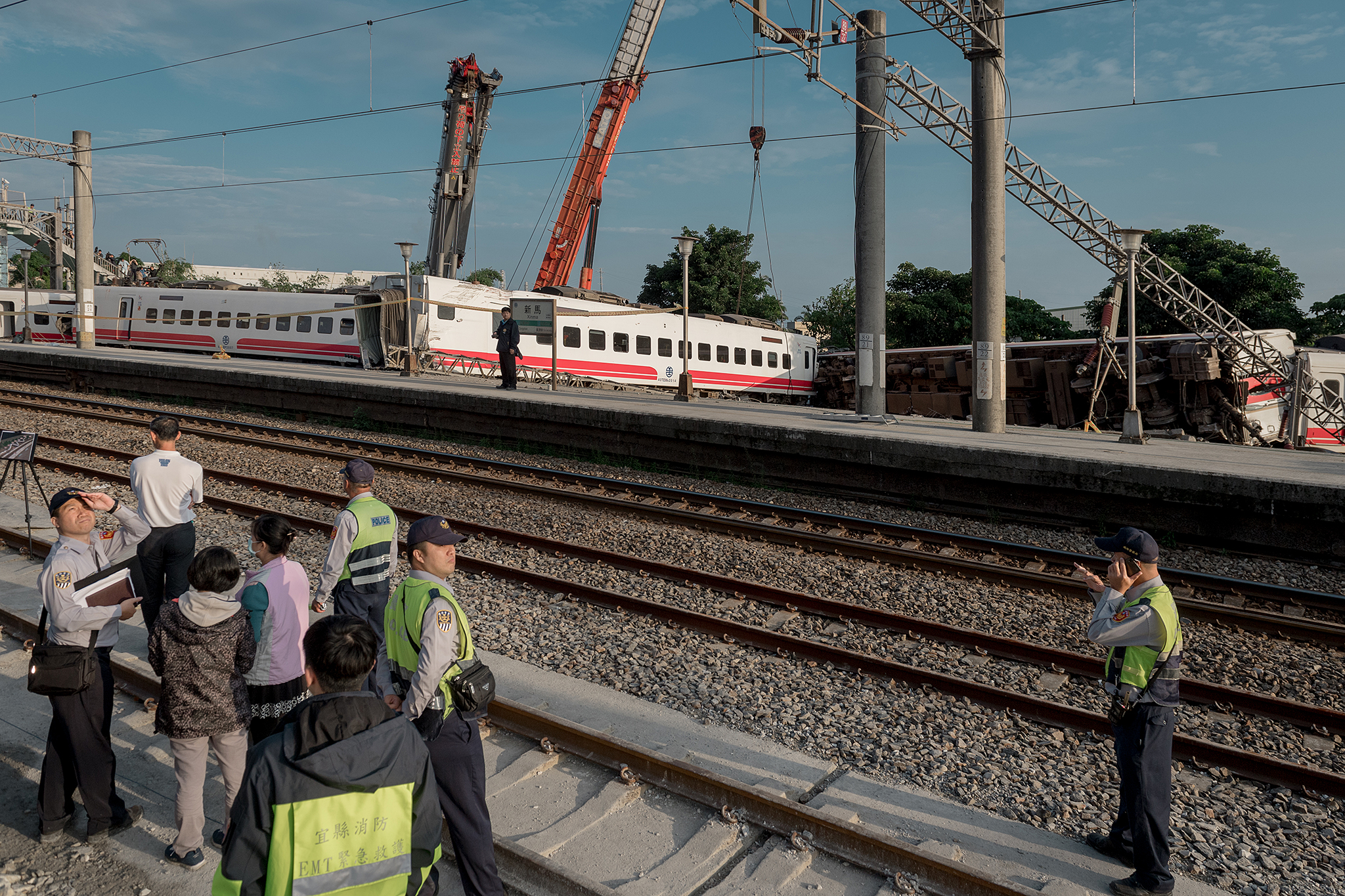
- Crashed carriages on the site

- Location within Taiwan

Details
- Date: 21 October 2018; 16:50 local time (UTC+8)
- Location: Xinma station, Su'ao, Yilan County; 70 km (43 mi) SE from Taipei
- Coordinates: 24°36′57″N 121°49′24″E
- Country: Taiwan
- Line: Yilan line, Eastern Trunk line
- Operator: Taiwan Railways Administration
- Service: 6432 Puyuma express bound for Taitung
- Incident type: Derailment
- Cause: Excessive speed, inactive automatic train protection system

Statistics
- Trains: 1
- Passengers: 366
- Deaths: 18
- Injured: 187
Route map of service 6432
- Red timestamp is time of crash, other timestamps are scheduled departures

On 21 October 2018, a passenger train derailed in Yilan County, Taiwan, killing 18 people and injuring 187. At the time, it was Taiwan's deadliest rail accident since a collision near Miaoli in 1991 that killed 30 people. The Taiwan Transportation Safety Board titled this rail accident of "TRA's Train No. 6432 at Xinma Station" (Chinese: 1021臺鐵第6432次車新馬站重大鐵道事故).

== Derailment ==
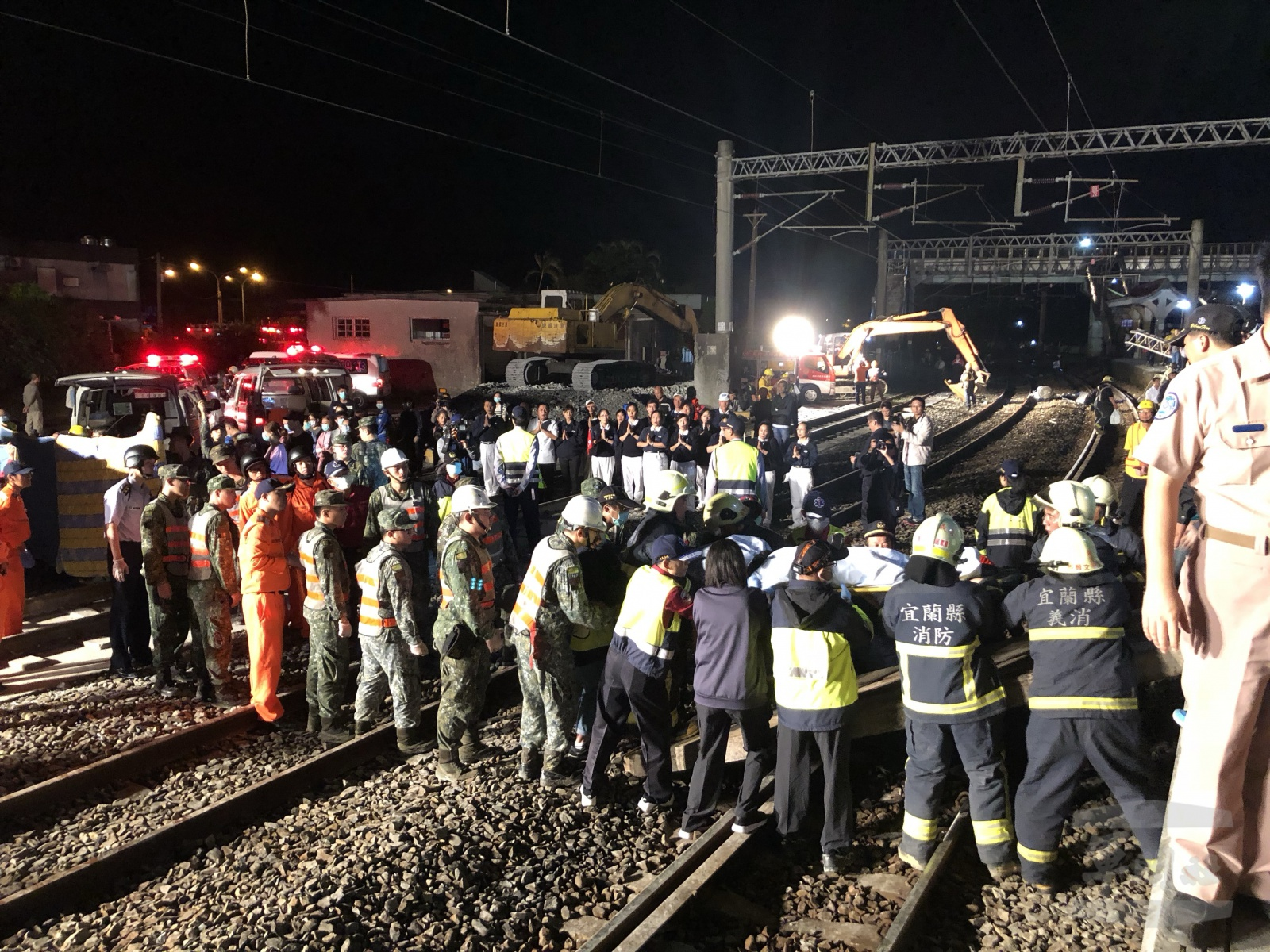
Military and emergency services taking part in the rescue operation

Location of derailment

Incident scene, simplified

At 16:50 local time (UTC+8), a Puyuma express train, service 6432 from Shulin bound for Taitung, derailed on a curve with a radius of 300 metres (980 ft) when passing through the Xinma station in Yilan County, about 70 kilometres (43 mi) from Taipei. There were 366 passengers travelling on the train.

Of the eight carriages, numbers 3 through 8 toppled over and collided into each other in a "W" shape, while the rest went off the track with lesser damage. The front car was seen tipped over at an angle of 75 degrees, and most of the fatalities are believed to have been in this car. Survivors said that the driver applied the emergency brake multiple times before the incident, and another claimed that the train sped up after the curve.

All trains in the eastern trunk line were halted in both directions, with replacement bus services provided. Hundreds of medics and firefighters, and 100 soldiers responded to the scene. As of 21:35 local time all passengers, including the dead, had been removed/evacuated from the wreckage. The derailment was the worst train accident in Taiwan since 1991, when 30 people were killed in a collision near Miaoli until a train derailment in 2021 killed 49 people in Hualien.

== Victims ==
At least 18 people were killed in the accident, with another 187 injured, all on board.

Six of the dead were reportedly under the age of 18. Taiwan's Railway Authority confirmed that eight of the dead were of the same family, and the Health Ministry confirmed that 53 injured passengers remained in the hospital.

== Investigation ==
The derailed train was built by the Japanese company Nippon Sharyo in 2011, and underwent major maintenance work in 2017. On 22 October 2018, it was reported that the driver of the train reported an issue with the main air compressor just before the derailment. The Chief Secretary of Taiwan Railways Administration, Chu Lai-shun, said that a full failure of the main air compressor would cause insufficient power and problems with deceleration, but should not cause a derailment. In addition, the train's automatic train protection (ATP) was disabled shortly before the derailment, which, according to the driver was because of an earlier fault which delayed the train. Prosecutors accused him of negligence for not turning it on again afterwards. Investigators believe that without ATP enabled, the train's speed was not properly monitored, which led to the train approaching the curve at a speed of 140 km/h (87 mph), almost twice the speed limit.

As part of the investigation, all 18 other Puyama trains in service on Taiwanese railways were thoroughly inspected. No fault was found. Nevertheless, a report by Chinese-language Apple Daily Sunday found that Taiwanese trains were experiencing problems with the ATP system, citing anonymous sources from within the TRA. As the investigation progressed, technical flaws with the connection of the train's protection system to the signalling centre were found with the Puyama trains, and Japanese manufacturer Nippon Sharyo promised the Taiwanese government it would fix the flaw by 11 November, with testing and certification expected to take a month.

=== Driver ===
The driver of the train was granted bail of NT$500,000 (US$16,167) on 23 October, after he had been detained for investigation.

=== Results ===
The conclusion of the investigation was announced by a press release on 6 June by the Taiwan Yilan District Prosecutors Office. The direct causes of the incident were found to be excessive speed in the curve and the disabling of the train protection system by the driver, in breach of relevant operating regulations. Issues with the main air compressor were found not to be a contributing factor.

Improper management of the testing process of Puyuma trains, which caused an absence of testing of the ATP remote monitoring system, resulted in an indictment of the former Deputy Director of the TRA's Department of Rolling Stock and of the Chief of TRA's Central Dispatch Office. Other staff involved in the incident, such as dispatchers and mechanics, were found not to be liable, and no evidence of corruption or neglect of duty by public officials was reported.

In response to views that there were shortcomings in the initial investigation, the Taiwanese government converted the Aviation Safety Council (ASC), which previously only dealt with aviation accidents and incidents, into the comprehensive Taiwan Transportation Safety Board (TTSB), which also covers maritime and train accidents and incidents.

== Responses ==
President Tsai Ing-wen called the accident a "major tragedy" and directed the government and military to "step up" rescue efforts. The President also called for an investigation into the crash, that would "make clear the timing and situation of the whole accident". In addition, "drastic reform of the TRA to restore public confidence in the safety of railway transportation" is to be carried out.

As a result of the incident, the Democratic Progressive Party and Kuomintang halted campaigning for the November local elections.

The Taipei Blood Donation Centre issued a press release that highlighted local blood donation centres and urged blood donors to donate.

=== Memorials ===
President Tsai met with relatives of the dead and injured on 22 October. She joined Buddhist monks in prayer at an altar next to the hospital.

=== Legal fallout ===
In March 2020, three people who worked for the TRA at the time of the derailment were impeached by the Control Yuan. In October 2021, the Yilan District Court sentenced the driver of the train to four years and six months imprisonment for negligent homicide. The court stated that he had inactivated the automatic train protection (ATP) system after passing Fulong because air compressors in the first and eighth cars were shutting down spontaneously, which inhibited acceleration of the train. When the train stopped at Yilan and Luodong, the driver did not reactivate ATP. Two other Taiwan Railways Administration officials were not guilty.

== See also ==
Other similar railway incidents:

Excessive speed around curves

- United Kingdom Morpeth rail crashes, 1969, 1984, 1994 – a total of 6 killed in three separate accidents
- Australia Waterfall train disaster, 2003 – 7 killed
- Japan Amagasaki derailment, 2005 - 107 killed
- Spain Santiago de Compostela derailment, 2013 – 79 killed
- United States Spuyten Duyvil derailment, 2013 – 4 killed
- United States 2015 Philadelphia train derailment – 8 killed
- United States 2017 Washington train derailment - 3 killed

Disabled train protection system

- United Kingdom Southall rail crash, 1997 – 7 killed
