= Jyväskylä rail accident =

1998 train accident in Jyväskylä, Finland

Coordinates: 62.237°N 25.745°E

Jyväskylä derailment
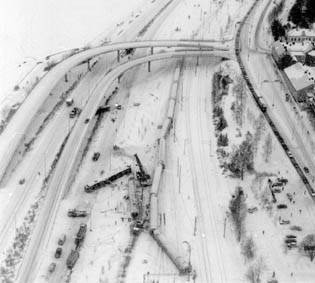

Details
- Date: 6 March 1998; 13:49 local time (11:49 UTC)
- Location: Jyväskylä
- Country: Finland
- Line: Orivesi–Jyväskylä
- Operator: VR Group
- Incident type: Derailment
- Cause: Excessive speed, human error

Statistics
- Trains: 1
- Passengers: 300
- Deaths: 10
- Injured: 94 (8 seriously)
Station diagram
Simplified

The Jyväskylä derailment occurred on 6 March 1998 in Jyväskylä, Finland, when the Sr1-driven express train P105 from Turku bound for Joensuu via Pieksämäki derailed. The train left the tracks after coming in too fast on a 35 km/h (22 mph) switch near the station. 300 people were on board (some sources say 500); the engine driver and nine passengers were killed, and 94 passengers injured.

The investigation found the cause of the accident to be human error in interpreting signals. The driver of the train was expecting the train to enter the station on another track, which had a higher speed limit of 80 kilometres per hour (50 mph). An estimate of the total cost of the accident was 21.5 million FIM (3.6 million euros).

== Chronology of events ==
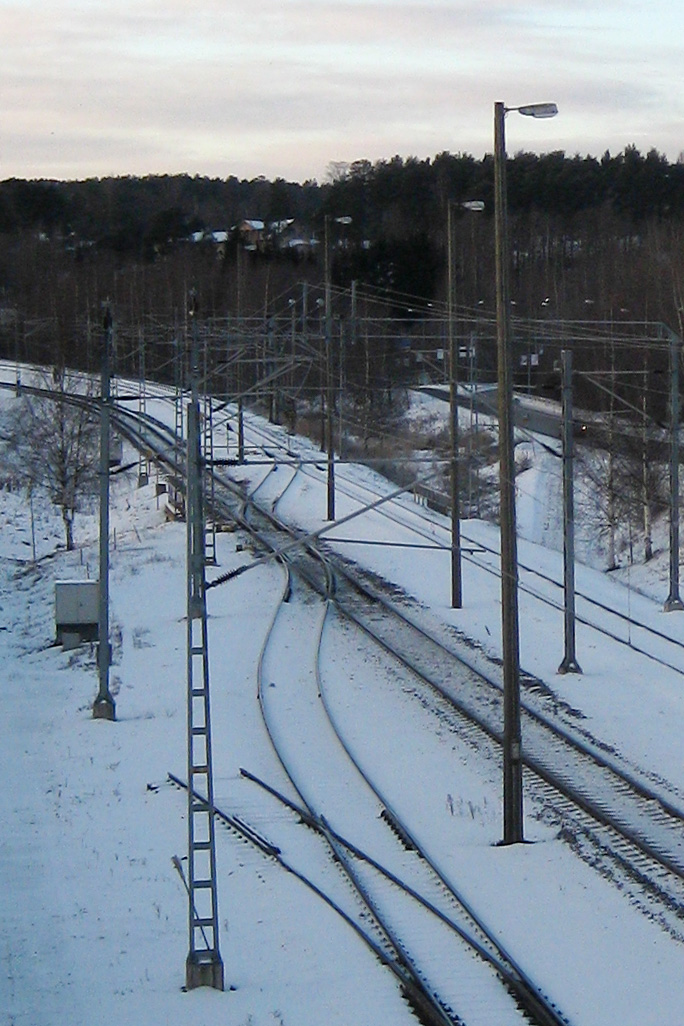
The train entered the railyard from the lower track on the left hand side of the picture. It then derailed when the switch in the middle of the picture (taken in 2010) forced it to the right.

The train had departed Tampere 20 minutes late, but was arriving at Jyväskylä only 10 minutes behind schedule. The crew of two drivers had switched seats at Jämsä, with the driver in charge (the engineer) looking out and the secondary driver (or fireman, Finnish: veturinlämmittäjä) driving the train when it arrived in Jyväskylä. The fireman was searching for a coffee bag in his personal bag 750 m (2,460 ft) before the distant signal of Jyväskylä railyard and handed it to the engineer, who then began to brew coffee.

While seven out of the nine daily trains arriving from Tampere were using track 1, this train was due to arrive on track 3 because of its length. However, track 3 was entered through a so-called short switch, with a maximum speed of 35 km/h (22 mph). Track 1, which had been used by all arriving trains until the end of 1997, featured a long switch, with a speed limit of 80 km/h (50 mph). According to the data available from the event recorder, the driver was seemingly prepared to enter the switch leading to track 1 at 80 km/h (50 mph). Even though emergency braking was initiated, it was effective for only 100 m (330 ft) before the switch.

The locomotive was thrown some 50 metres (160 ft) away from the track, crossing a highway and hitting a concrete bridge support at approximately 90 km/h (56 mph). The driving fireman was killed on impact. The two coaches at the front of the train rolled over and six others derailed, remaining upright. Many passengers were thrown out of the overturned cars and nine were killed as they were crushed under them.

As the accident happened close to the city center, the first rescuers were on the scene only four minutes after the accident. However, more units were quickly needed when the extent of the accident became clear. Luckily many of the rescue workers had been involved in a large scale accident less than two years earlier during the 1996 Neste 1000 Lakes Rally (renamed the following year as Rally Finland), when one spectator was killed and 32 injured when a rally car hit a group of spectators during the Harju special stage. Lifting equipment was needed, as many passengers were trapped under overturned carriages; three people were saved from under the cars with air cushions.

== Causes ==
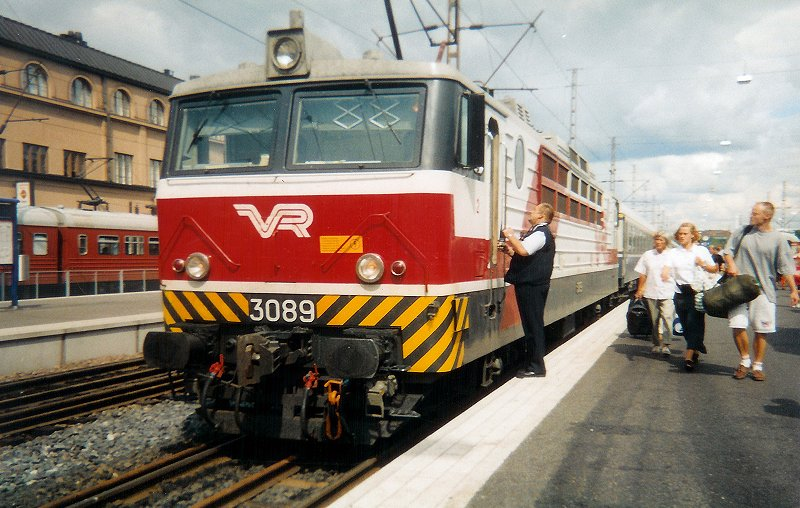
The locomotive, VR Class Sr1 number 3089 (here at Helsinki in 1997) was badly damaged in the accident and withdrawn from service.

The investigation of the accident was slow at first and included reconstructions of the accident. The causes became clearer after a few days when the black box of the train was deciphered and the surviving engineer had recovered enough to be heard.

A number signal showing the proceed 80 aspect.

The main cause of the accident was blamed on human error when interpreting signals. The Finnish signalling system at that time was still less than ten years old. It contained a number signal as a complement to the expect 35 or proceed 35 aspects to allow higher speeds, such as 80 or 110 km/h (50 or 68 mph). The signals at Jyväskylä were showing expect 35 and proceed 35; with the number signal they were able to show the signals expect 80 and proceed 80 respectively for trains directed on track 1. According to the data recovered from the train and subsequent braking tests, it seems that the driver had misinterpreted the signals and arrived at Jyväskylä, fully expecting to enter track 1 at a speed of 80 km/h (50 mph), and, realising what had happened, applied emergency braking just before the fateful switch.

The accident also showed problems in VR's management. The company had not upgraded safety instructions and the notes handed to the drivers were not easily readable. The accident investigation board interviewed 100 railway engineers, 70 of which answered, during the investigation. Almost 30% of them had mixed up number signals and over half had seen unsafe incidents during the past year.

The fireman driving the train was tired as he had finished his previous shift at 06:05 in the morning and had not slept well at the provided facilities at Tampere. Additionally, the engineer had begun brewing coffee just before arriving at Jyväskylä. He was then unable to warn his colleague about the overspeed before it was too late.

== Aftermath ==
This accident, following the Jokela rail accident two years before, showed the importance of the automatic train control system, which could have prevented both of them. At Jyväskylä, the system would have first warned the driver, then braked automatically 1.4 kilometres (0.87 mi) before the switch, slowing the train to a safe speed. Deployment of the system had started in 1995, and it was hurried in the aftermath of the accidents.

VR offered compensations to those involved in the accident, and VR Cargo cancelled a safety campaign that was started only a few days before. The accident caused major disturbances to Jyväskylä's road and rail traffic.

The accident investigation board recommended the use of seatbelts in trains. VR implemented airplane-style seatbelts in three InterCity carriages during the year 1999, but finally decided against a wide-range deployment due to their impracticality.

The surviving engineer was sued on 25 January 2000 for causing a traffic hazard, negligent homicide and negligent bodily injury. He was acquitted during the same year by the Jyväskylä District Court. The decision was upheld in November 2001 by the Vaasa Court of Appeal, freeing him from charges.

== See also ==
- Finnish railway signalling

=== Similar accidents ===
- Jokela rail accident – overspeed through turnout
- Brühl train disaster – overspeed through turnout
- Waterfall rail accident – overspeed through sharp curve
