= Sutton Coldfield rail crash =

Train crash in Warwickshire, England

Sutton Coldfield train crash

Details
- Date: 23 January 1955; 16:13
- Location: Sutton Coldfield, Warwickshire
- Coordinates: 52°33′55″N 01°49′28″W
- Country: England
- Line: Cross-City Line (present name)
- Cause: Overspeed on curve

Statistics
- Trains: 1
- Passengers: 300
- Deaths: 17
- Injured: 25

The Sutton Coldfield train crash took place at about 16:13 on 23 January 1955 in Sutton Coldfield, Warwickshire (now within Birmingham), when a diverted southbound express passenger train travelling from York to Bristol, derailed due to excessive speed on a sharp curve.

Seventeen people died, but a worse loss was prevented when a northbound express train was stopped at a hastily-changed signal just short of the station, which was closed at the time.

== Accident circumstances ==
Headed by an LMS Black Five steam locomotive No 45274, the 12:15 York to Bristol express, consisting of ten carriages, approached Sutton Coldfield railway station, which was closed due to the day being a Sunday, at about 55-60 mph (88-96 km/h)—twice the permitted speed of 30 mph. When it reached the sharp curve immediately before the station, the train derailed, colliding with the platforms.

The carriages, engine, and station buildings were severely damaged. The first carriage was crushed between the engine and the second carriage. The fourth carriage was knocked into the air causing it to drag along the platform awning, damaging both the awning and the platforms to either side. The fifth carriage was virtually destroyed. Seventeen people, including the train crew, were killed and 25 injured.

The train had been diverted away from its usual route into Birmingham via Tamworth because of engineering work. The regular driver did not know the diversionary route via Sutton Coldfield, so another, driver, fully conversant with it, had joined him at Burton-on-Trent to 'conduct' him over this section. However, the regular driver, complaining that the rough riding of the engine was tiring him, left the footplate and took a seat in the train, leaving the conducting driver in charge. This action was later criticised by the Ministry of Transport's Chief Inspecting Officer of Railways, George R. S Wilson, who pointed out that, even though the regular driver did not know the route, the rules in operation were clear that safety of the train was still his responsibility.

== Emergency response ==
The number of casualties was prevented from rising as a result of the actions of two railway employees who changed the signals to danger, stopping the Bristol-York express just short of the station, raised the alarm to signalling staff, and placed detonators on the tracks to warn oncoming trains. One of the two had been injured and shocked by the accident, and both were rewarded with gold watches for their work.

Two local people also rushed up the railway line to stop a train heading towards the crash site.

The scene was attended to by a mobile surgical unit from Birmingham Accident Hospital as well as 40 additional ambulances from surrounding districts. Royal Air Force servicemen from Whitehouse Common provided aid to the emergency services.

A local fun fair operator lent a portable generator and electric lights.

== Possible causes ==
Although the excessive speed was the major factor in the accident, the exact cause was never fully established. The accident occurred in broad daylight and the driver knew the line well. There was no evidence of mechanical failure on the train. The driver and fireman died in the locomotive, so the reason for the excessive speed was never established. Investigators identified several factors that could have contributed to the excessive speed:

- The train was running late and making up time.
- There was a gradient to climb after the station which was best approached at full speed.
- The steam locomotive (like most at the time) was not fitted with a speedometer.
- There was no lineside signage indicating the value of the speed restriction.
- It was rare for trains on this route to be passing through Sutton Coldfield station without stopping.
- The engine was riding roughly, which may have contributed to the driver's misjudging the speed.

There were also two factors that increased the likelihood of derailment and the severity of the consequences:

- The 15 chain radius curve had a sharp knuckle to only 8.5 chains radius at a crossover. The curve was realigned after the accident to a smooth 15 chains radius throughout.
- The levels of damage were increased by impact of the engine and carriages with the station platforms and roof.

It is also somewhat unusual for a train to actually derail at a factor of less than 2 above the speed restriction; normally the safety margin was higher. Calculations suggested that derailment would be expected on this curve at a speed of 50-55 mph.

== Consequences ==
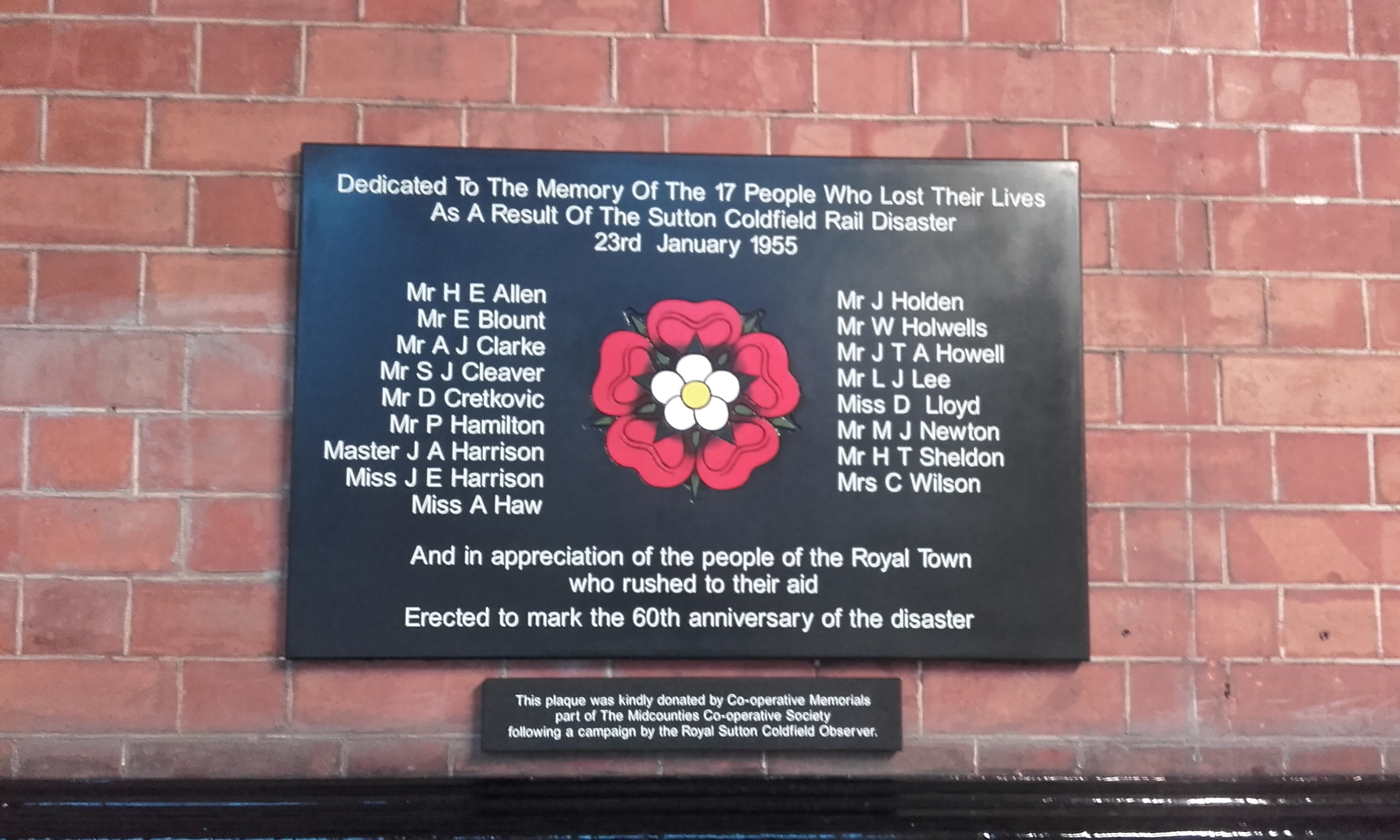
Memorial at Sutton Coldfield station to the victims of the crash

Following this accident, lineside speed restriction signs were universally adopted; previously there had been no visual reminder to the driver of speed restrictions on many routes. The Inspector also suggested the use of speed recorders, as in France, but this was not adopted.

On 23 January 2016, the 61st anniversary of the crash, a memorial to the victims was unveiled, at Sutton Coldfield station, by the Lord Mayor of Birmingham, Councillor Ray Hassall.

== Similar accidents ==
- (United Kingdom) Salisbury rail crash - 1906 - Overspeed through sharp curve through station. 28 killed.
- (United Kingdom) Morpeth rail crashes - 1969 etc. - Overspeed through sharp curve.
- (Australia) Waterfall rail accident - 2003 - overspeed through sharp curve - 7 killed
- (Japan) Amagasaki rail crash - 2005 - Overspeed through sharp curve. 107 killed, 562 injured
- (Spain) Santiago de Compostela rail disaster - 2013 - Overspeed through sharp curve - 79 killed, 139 injured.

== See also ==
- List of rail accidents in the United Kingdom
