= Pennsylvania Railroad class K29s =

20th century prototype locomotive

K29s class
Type and origin
- Power type: Steam
- Builder: Alco-Schenectady
- Build date: 1911
- Total produced: 1
Specifications
- Configuration
  - Whyte: 4-6-2
- Gauge: 4 ft 8 1/2 in (1,435 mm)
- Driver dia.: 80 in (2,000 mm)
- Wheelbase
  - Engine: 36 ft 5 in (11,100 mm)
- Loco weight: 317,550 lb (144,038 kg)
- Tender weight: 175,700 lb (79,696 kg)
- Total weight: 492,700 lb (223,485 kg)
- Tender type: Class 80-P-83
- Fuel type: coal
- Fuel capacity: 14 tons
- Water cap.: 8,280 imp gal (37,600 L; 9,940 US gal)
- Firebox
  - Type: Radial stay
  - Grate area: 54 sq ft (5.0 m^{2})
- Heating surface
  - Firebox: 253 sq ft (23.5 m^{2})
  - Total surface: 4,625 sq ft (430 m^{2})
- Valve gear: Walschaerts
Performance figures
- Tractive effort: 43,375 lbf (193 kN)
Career
- Operators: Pennsylvania Railroad
- Class: K29s
- Number in class: 1
- Numbers: 3395
- Locale: PRR Pittsburgh Division, Pennsylvania, United States
- Retired: 1929
- Disposition: Scrapped in 1929

The Pennsylvania Railroad's class K29s comprised a single experimental 4-6-2 "Pacific" type steam locomotive. Constructed by Alco-Schenectady, it was given road number 3395. Although only one demonstrator was constructed, the K29s would become the basis for the highly successful K4s Pacifics and L1s Mikados. The lone example spent most of its life on the PRR's Pittsburgh division main line and was retired around 1929.

== History ==
The sole K29s, PRR 3395, was constructed by the American Locomotive Company's Schenectady works in 1911 as a demonstrator engine for the Pennsylvania Railroad. The success of the single experimental K29s lead to the development of the equally successful K4s class Pacific and L1s class Mikado locomotives. Despite its success, the K29s was one of only a handful of locomotives constructed by Alco Schenectady as the PRR preferred its own Altoona Works as well the Baldwin Locomotive Works in Philadelphia for large scale locomotive production. The sole K29s spent its entire operating life on the PRR's Pittsburg Division main line pulling limited passenger trains and being used as a helper engine. Rumors circulated stating the K29s was able to haul 13 full sized passenger cars unassisted on an uphill grade between Gallitzin, Pennsylvania and Altoona, Pennsylvania. By 1929 however, the K29s was stricken from the PRR's locomotive roster.

== Specifications ==
The K29s had six 80 inches (203 cm) diameter driving wheels and a 36 feet 5 inches (11.10 m) total wheelbase. The engine alone weighed 317,550 pounds (144,040 kg) with the total weight including the tender was 492,700 pounds (223,500 kg). The K29s used 27 in × 28 in (686 mm × 711 mm) cylinders fitted with Walschaerts valve gear, its tractive effort being 43,375 pounds-force (193 kN). The total firebox heating surface was 4,625 square feet (429.7 m^{2}) with a 66.1 square feet (6.14 m^{2}) grate.

It was paired with a Class 80-P-83 tender that could carry 8,280 US gallons (31,300 L; 6,890 imp gal) of water and 14 short tons (12.7 t; 12.5 long tons) of soft coal. The K29s had an unusually massive boiler for its time, measuring between 81.25 inches (2,064 mm) and 89 inches (2,300 mm) in diameter and 22 feet (6.7 m) in length from firebox to smokebox door. Most of the basic specifications can also be found on the succeeding K4s Pacifics, which was directly developed from the K29s.
