= Michael Davies (judge) =

Sir Michael Davies

Justice of the High Court
- In office 1973–1991

Personal details
- Born: Alfred William Michael Davies; 29 July 1921
- Died: 5 September 2006 (aged 85)
- Education: King Edward VI College, Stourbridge; University of Birmingham

Sir Alfred William Michael Davies (29 July 1921 – 5 September 2006) was a British barrister who served as a High Court Judge from 1973 to 1991. He was one of the first judges appointed specifically to hear defamation cases, one of the few areas of civil law in England in which a jury remains the tribunal of fact, and was in charge of managing the list of libel cases from 1988 to 1991.

In retirement, he conducted a visitor's inquiry into allegations of poor academic standards at University College, Swansea in 1992 to 1993, and was instrumental in the foundation of the Expert Witness Institute in 1996.

== Early and private life ==
Davies was born in Stourbridge and educated at King Edward VI College, Stourbridge. He read law at Birmingham University.

== Legal career ==
Davies was called to the bar at Lincoln's Inn in 1948, where he became a bencher in 1972 and was Treasurer in 1991. He practised on the Midland Circuit, and became a QC in 1964.

He led the prosecution of Buster Edwards in 1966 for his part in the Great Train Robbery three years earlier, and of William Waite, the "gentle poisoner" who had killed his wife.

He was the Leader of the Midland Circuit and a member of the Bar Council from 1968 to 1971, and then Joint Leader of the Midland and Oxford Circuit from 1971 to 1973.

== Judicial career ==
Davies had extensive experience as a judge in lower courts before he was appointed to the High Court. He was deputy chairman of Northamptonshire Quarter Sessions from 1962 to 1971; Recorder of Grantham from 1963 to 1965 and of Derby from 1965 to 1971; Chancellor of the Diocese of Derby from 1971 to 1973; a Commissioner of Assize in Birmingham in 1970; and a Crown Court judge from 1972 to 1973.

Davies became a judge of the High Court in 1973, receiving the customary knighthood. He was assigned to the Queen's Bench Division. As the senior judge, he became Keeper of the Juries List in 1988, taking charge of the limited number of English civil cases — principally defamation cases — in which a judge continues to sit as arbiter of the law, with a jury as tribunal of fact. As a result, he sat on many high-profile cases, many of which were won by plaintiffs who were awarded ever large sums in damages. He was very active in managing the number and turnover of cases on the list, cutting the number of cases on the list from around 240 in 1988, when he was appointed, to only 50 cases two years later. The time before a case came to trial was also reduced from three years to only one.

Davies was the judge in the case brought by Koo Stark in 1988, against newspapers that had claimed she had an adulterous affair with The Duke of York. He was also the judge in a successful libel case brought in 1990 by Sonia Sutcliffe, wife of the Yorkshire Ripper, against Private Eye, which alleged that she had sold her life story to the Daily Mail. She was initially awarded then-record damages of £600,000 (reduced to £60,000 on appeal). Ian Hislop, editor of Private Eye, said on the steps of the court after losing the case: "If that's justice, then I'm a banana."

In 1990, he also presided over the libel case brought by Lord Aldington against Count Nikolai Tolstoy, in relation to allegations of bad faith in returning Cossacks to Joseph Stalin's Soviet Union and suspected Slovene Home Guard/Croatian Ustaše to Marshal Tito's Yugoslavia in 1945 at the end of the Second World War, which set a new record for libel damages of £1.5 million. He also sat on the libel case brought by Andrew Neil against Peregrine Worsthorne, in relation to a leading article in The Sunday Telegraph implying that Neil knew Pamela Bordes was a call-girl before their affair in 1988, and in other cases involving celebrities such as Elton John, Tessa Sanderson, Linford Christie, Viscount Linley, Ranulph Fiennes and Neil Kinnock.

== Retirement ==
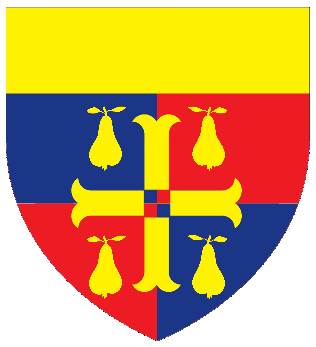
Davies's shield of arms

He retired in 1991, when he was Treasurer of Lincoln's Inn. He conducted a visitor's inquiry in 1992 to 1993 into the "Great Battle" at University College, Swansea, over allegations of poor academic standards in its MA in philosophy and health care.

He was founding chairman of the Expert Witness Institute in 1996, and enjoyed reading, golf, theatre and opera, particularly the Welsh National Opera, and black and white films.
