= Expert Witness Institute =

The Expert Witness Institute is a UK legal institute for expert witnesses founded by Lord Woolf, Michael Davies (judge) and other legal experts including Sir Robin Jacob and Roger V Clements. It was incorporated as a non-profit making company in 1997.

The Institute developed views on the Ambush defence in 1994 Joint Conference entitled "Beyond reasonable doubt" organised with the Royal Society of Medicine.
