= Jokela rail accident =

Train accident in Tuusula, Finland, on 21 April 1996

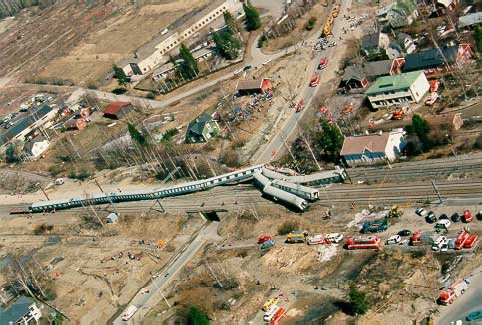

Details
- Date: 21 April 1996; 07:08 (EEST)
- Location: Jokela, Tuusula; 50 km (31 mi) N from Helsinki
- Coordinates: 60°33′16″N 024°58′02″E
- Country: Finland
- Line: Helsinki–Riihimäki railway
- Operator: VR Group
- Incident type: Derailment
- Cause: Excessive speed

Statistics
- Trains: 1
- Passengers: 139
- Deaths: 4
- Injured: 75
Route map

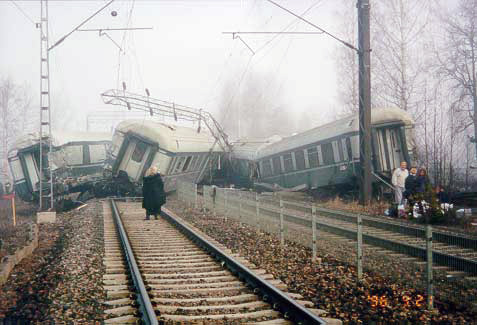
Fog at the accident site one hour and a half after the derailment.

The Jokela rail accident occurred on 21 April 1996, at 07:08 local time (04:08 UTC) in Tuusula, Finland, approximately 50 kilometres (30 mi) north of Helsinki. Four people were killed and 75 injured when express train P82 from Oulu, bound for Helsinki, derailed in heavy fog. The overnight sleeper train was carrying 139 passengers and five crew members. The official investigation found the accident was caused by overspeeding through a slow-speed turnout.

It is estimated that the total cost of the accident was over FIM 26 million (€4.3 million).

== Causes ==
Railway maintenance work was going on near Jokela railway station, and the usual southbound track was out of service. Because of heavy fog and high speed, the driver was unable to see or react in time to the distant signal that warned about a divergent routing with a turnout speed limit of 35 kilometres per hour (22 mph) ahead. The visibility was a few dozen metres. Before the accident, drivers of passing trains had reported that the visibility of signals was very low. Moreover, the printed notice about the track diversion, the so-called weekly warning, was confusingly written.

When arriving at the home signal, the train was still running at 133 kilometres per hour (83 mph), having missed the distant signal imposing a limit of 35 kilometres per hour (22 mph). Upon noticing the signal, the driver made an emergency brake application but could only decrease the speed to 124 kilometres per hour (77 mph) before the train entered the turnout. During the journey, the driver had slightly oversped a number of times to maintain the schedule.

== Aftermath ==
The Accident Investigation Board produced 18 recommendations, which included improvements over railway signalling, better seat fixing, improvements on communication and accelerated building of the automatic train control system. However, the Jyväskylä rail accident happened only two years later, showing that more improvements were necessary.

== Similar accidents ==
Finland

- Jyväskylä rail accident – overspeed through turnout

Australia

- Waterfall rail accident – overspeed through sharp curve

Germany

- Brühl train disaster – overspeed through turnout

United Kingdom

- Milton rail crash – overspeed through turnout
- Bourne End rail crash – overspeed through turnout
- Goswick rail crash – overspeed through turnout

== See also ==
- Lists of rail accidents
