= Railway accident =

Disaster involving one or more trains

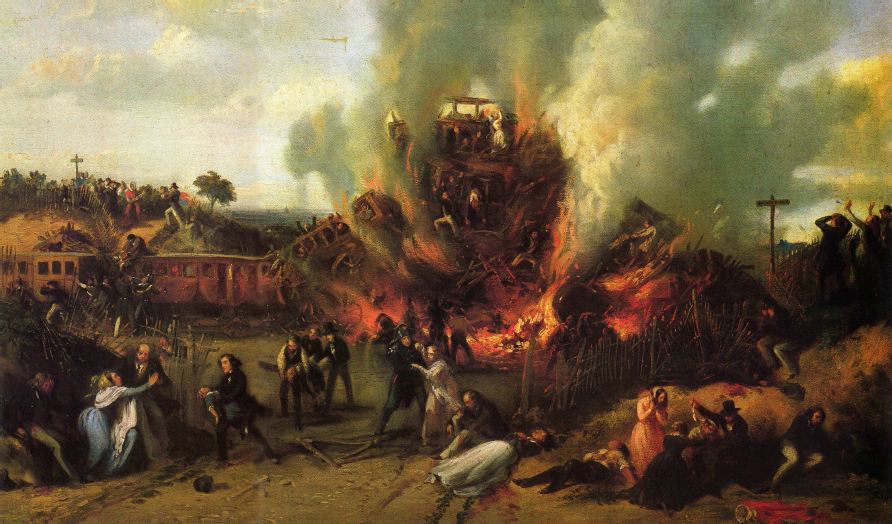
Versailles rail accident in 1842, 57 people were killed including the French explorer Jules Dumont d'Urville.

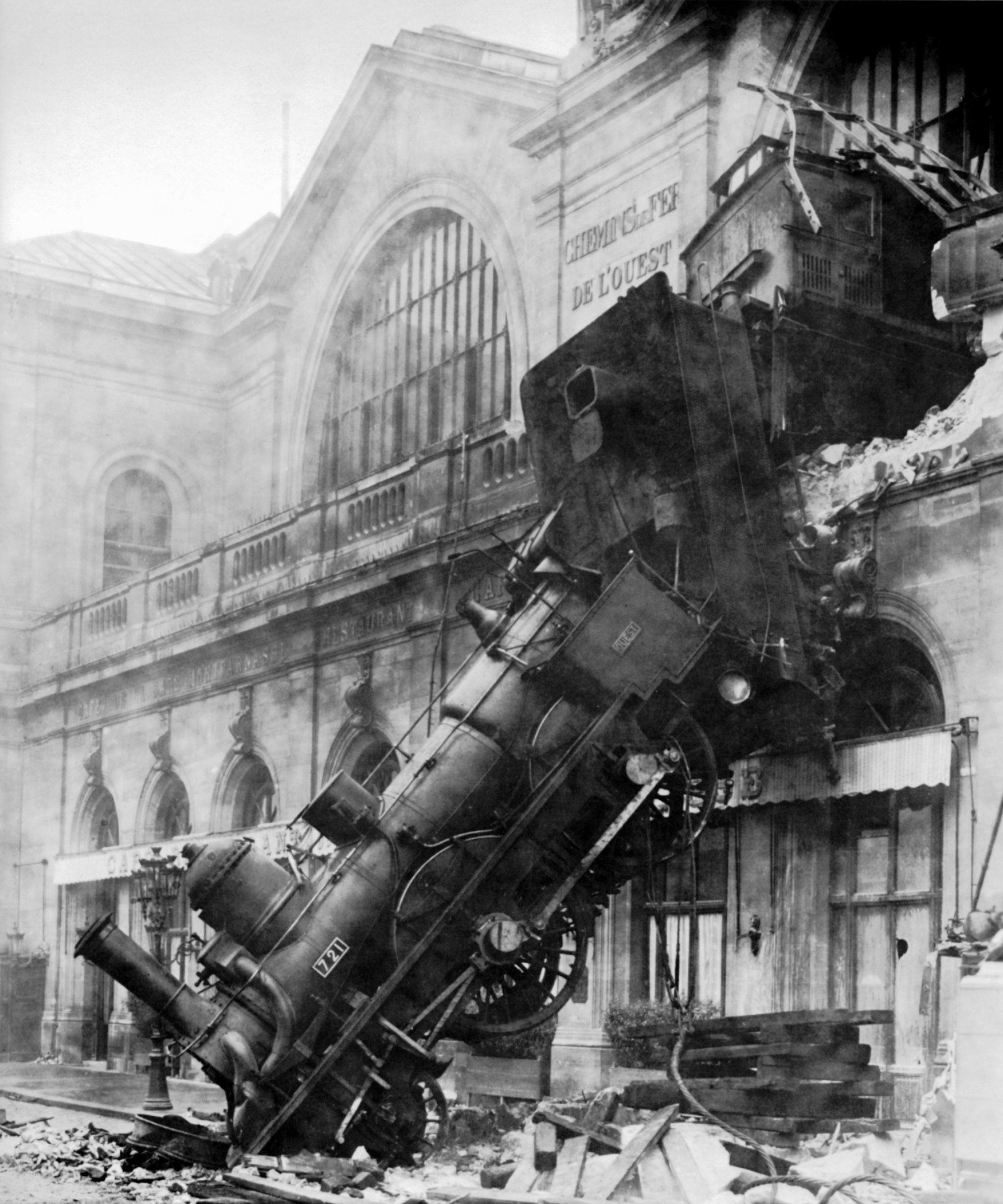
Montparnasse derailment with one fatality at Gare Montparnasse in Paris, 1895

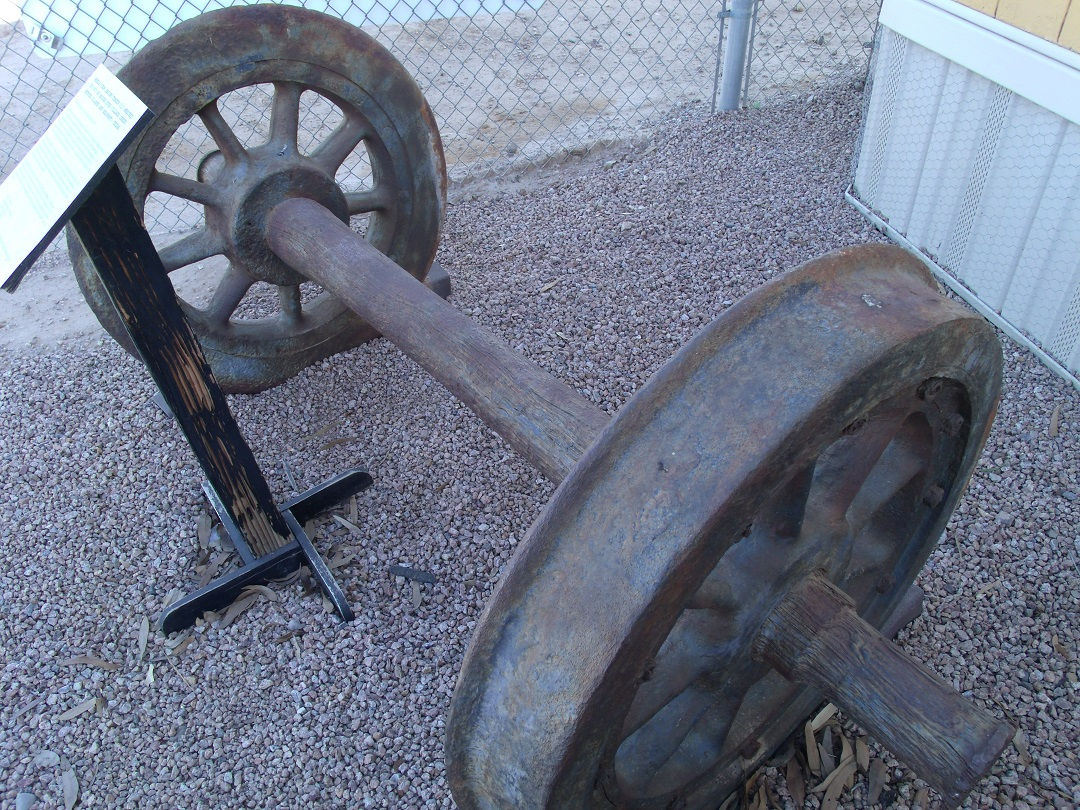
Wheels from Engine Tender#013 which was destroyed in a wreck in 1907 on a bridge over Village Creek between Silsbee and Beaumont, Texas. The wheels are on display in the Arizona Railway Museum.

A railway accident (also known as a train accident, train wreck, and train crash) is a type of disaster involving one or more trains. Train wrecks often occur as a result of miscommunication, for example when a moving train meets another train on the same track, when the wheels of train come off the track, or when a boiler explosion occurs. Train accidents have often been widely covered in popular media and in folklore. A head-on collision between two trains is colloquially called a "cornfield meet" in the United States. Railway accidents can result from a combination of technical failures, human factors, infrastructure conditions, and organizational or regulatory issues. Modern safety research often treats railway systems as complex socio-technical systems in which accidents arise from interactions among multiple components rather than a single cause.

== Types of accidents ==
The classification of railway accidents—both in terms of cause and effect—is a valuable aid in studying railway accidents in order to help to prevent similar ones occurring in the future. Systematic investigation for over 150 years has led to railways' excellent safety record compared, for example, with road transport.

Ludwig von Stockert (1913) proposed a classification of accidents by their effects (consequences) – e.g., head-on-collisions, rear-end collisions, derailments. Schneider and Mase (1968) proposed an additional classification by causes – e.g., driver's errors, signalmen's errors, mechanical faults. Similar categorisations had been made by implication in previous books e.g. Rolt (1956), but Stockert's and Schneider/Mase's are more systematic and complete. With minor changes, they represent best knowledge.

=== Collisions ===
In comparison to other types of railway incidents, collisions are very rare, with about one in 24 crashes being collisions between multiple trains. There are several types of train collision, such as head-on, rear-end and side collisions. The three most common causes of collisions in freight trains are all types of human error: failure to obey or display signals, speeding, and violation of mainline rules. Of these, the misuse of signals accounted for over half of the total damage costs. Collisions are the most severe type of train accident, causing on average 21 casualties in passenger trains.

=== Derailments ===
Apart from incidents at grade crossings, derailments are the most common type of train accident, accounting for approximately 18 percent of all train accidents between 1996 and 2017 According to a 2018 study, the most common causes of derailments include, in order of frequency: broken rails and welds, track geometry, bearing failure, and wheel failures. Speed is an important factor in determining the most common types of derailment, with human error common below 25 mph, but rare elsewhere, and mechanical issues peaking at higher speeds. Because the majority of derailments are caused by rail problems, rail maintenance and track geometry inspection have been found to be some of the most effective strategies to prevent derailment.

=== Other ===
Other forms of train accident include:

- Fires, explosions and release of hazardous chemicals (including sabotage/terrorism)
- People falling from trains (including as a result of train surfing), collisions with people on tracks
- Attack, shooting or bombing on a train.

== Causes of accidents ==
=== Driver error ===
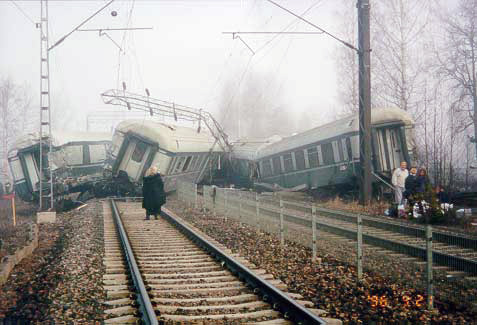
The Jokela rail accident was caused by overspeeding through a slow-speed turnout in Jokela, Finland. Four people were killed and 75 injured.

Driver error is the most dangerous cause of passenger train derailments and collisions, with 21 deaths occurring on average when driver error is involved. Driver error can take several forms, the most common in passenger trains being disobeying signals, speeding, and disregarding mainline rules. Freight trains follow a similar pattern, with the top three types of driver error accounting for over 75% of all freight collisions. Human factors, including driver error, are most prevalent in the 81–100 mph range. Features such as positive train control help prevent the most common types of human error, such as speeding and disregard of signals. Human factors relating to automation, such as unsupervised use of automated systems and ignorance of alarms, are also known to have caused several train accidents.

=== Signalman error ===
Errors caused by the actions of signalmen include:

- Allowing two trains into same occupied block section
- Incorrect operation of signals, points or token equipment

=== Rolling stock failure ===
Issues with rolling stock include:

- Poor design
- Poor maintenance
- Undetected damage
- Overloading or freight that is not adequately secured.
- Fire starting from combustion motors, electric cables or equipment, leaking fuel or cooling oil

=== Civil engineering failure ===
Issues with the civil engineering of the railway include:

- Track (permanent way) faults
- Bridge and tunnel collapses
- Poor track or junction layout

=== Other people ===
Reasons other people accidentally cause a train accident include:

- Accidental track obstruction, e.g., with road vehicles or by working construction vehicles

People can break, place something, intentionally set the switch to a collision course, destroy tracks, and this is called rail sabotage. Reasons other people deliberately cause a train accident include:

- Deliberate track obstruction, e.g., with road vehicles or (heavy) objects
- Intentional damage to infrastructure like tracks, points or signals
- Intentional misalignment of switches to send the train to a collision course
- Level crossing misuse
- Trespass
- Riot
- Terrorism

=== Natural causes ===
- Track obstruction or damage by landslides, avalanches, floods, trees
- Fog or snow that obscure signals or the current position of the train
- Wet leaves (or their remains) making the tracks slippery.

=== Contributory factors ===
- Strength of rolling stock
- Fire hazards or dangerous goods in the train, in involved road vehicles or the vicinity
- Effectiveness of brakes
- Inadequate rules

== See also ==
- Crash at Crush
- Lists of rail accidents
- List of accidents and disasters by death toll
- List of bridge disasters
- List of level crossing crashes
- Runaway train
- Signal passed at danger
- Tram accident
- Wrong-side failure
