= Wulaokeng Scenic Area =

Park in Su'ao, Yilan County, Taiwan

- 武荖坑風景區
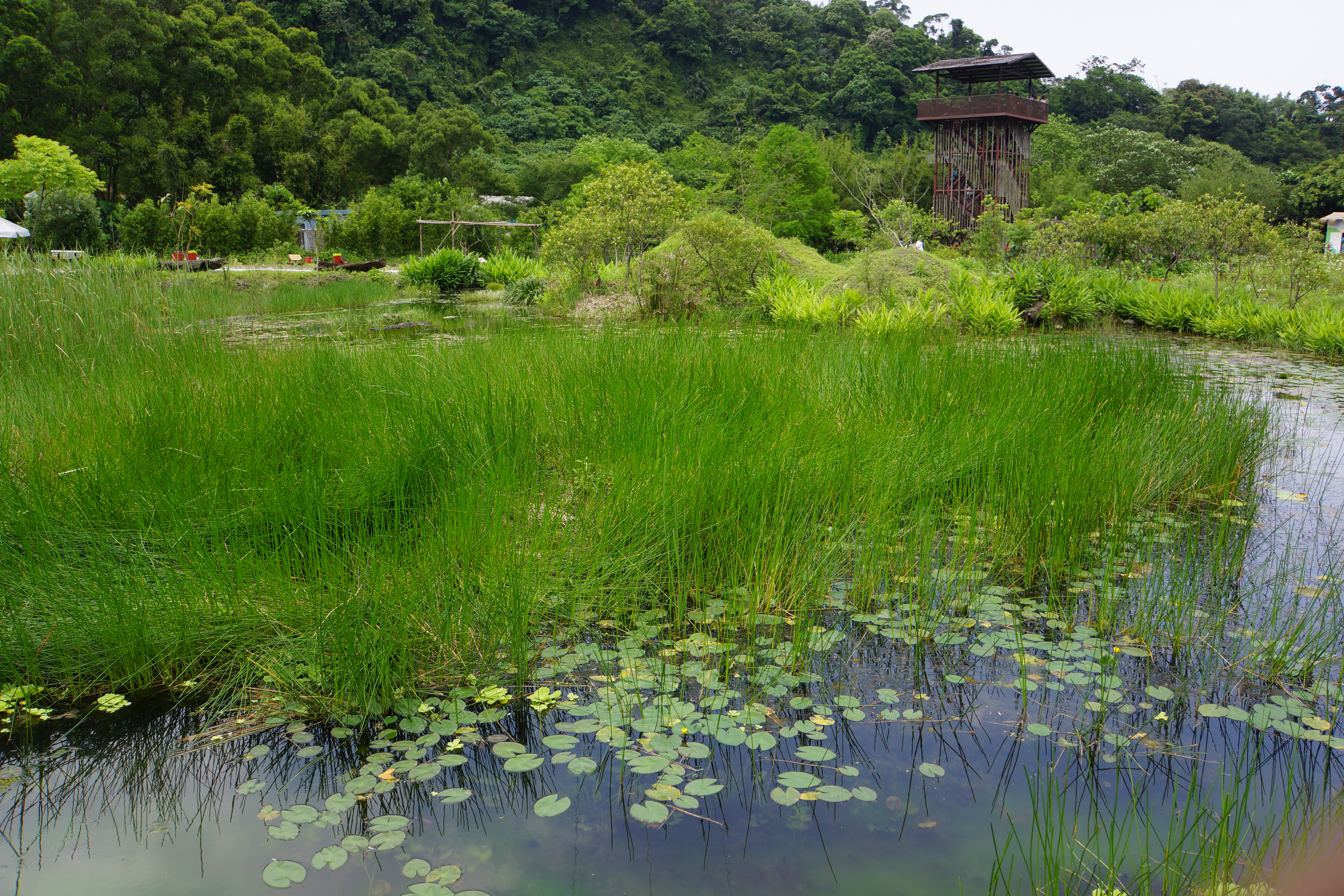
- Interactive map of Wulaokeng Scenic Area
- Type: park
- Location: Su'ao, Yilan County, Taiwan
- Coordinates: 24°36′38″N 121°48′53.1″E
- Area: 400 hectares (990 acres)

The Wulaokeng Scenic Area (traditional Chinese: 武荖坑風景區; simplified Chinese: 武荖坑风景区; pinyin: Wǔlǎokēng Fēngjǐng Qū) is a park in Su'ao Township, Yilan County, Taiwan.

== Geology ==
The park spreads across 400 hectares of area and is bounded by the Xincheng River on its east. It features camping ground, and barbecue area.

== Transportation ==
The park is accessible within walking distance west of Xinma Station of Taiwan Railway.

== See also ==
- List of tourist attractions in Taiwan
