= Ambush defence =

Type of defence in UK law

An ambush defence is one in which defence evidence - notably from expert witnesses - has not been adduced in advance to the prosecuting authorities, leading to their inability to rebut it. The term is used in United Kingdom jurisprudence. Since 1987, the possibility of the ambush defence has been much reduced by The Crown Court (Advance Notice of Expert Evidence) Rules 1987, made under section 81 of the Police and Criminal Evidence Act 1984, which in essence require the defence to provide the prosecution with copies of expert witness reports in sufficient time for the prosecution to consider the nature of and if necessary prepare rebuttal evidence opposing the report.

An example of the ambush defence is found in a paper given by Judge John Milford QC at a 1994 Joint Conference entitled "Beyond reasonable doubt" organised by the Royal Society of Medicine and the Expert Witness Institute. Discussing the trial of a train driver following the 1984 derailment of a train near Morpeth he wrote:

The case of R v Allen 1985 illustrates the position which applied hitherto. The driver of a train which came off the rails at the Morpeth curve was prosecuted for driving under the influence of alcohol. However, the defence at the last minute provided medical evidence which suggested that at certain times the driver might pass out and the prosecution not having prior knowledge of this were unable to rebut it. The driver was acquitted.
