= Xinma railway station =

Railway station in Yilan County, Taiwan

Xinma 新馬車站
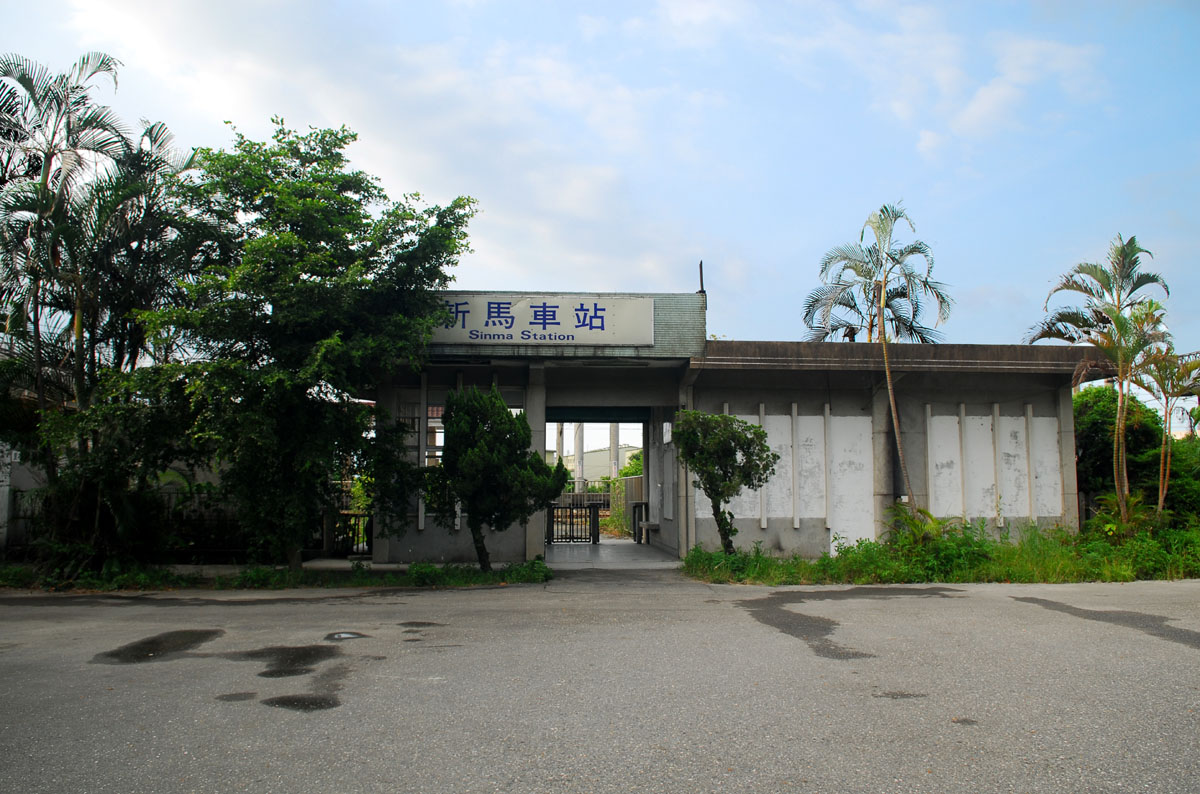

General information
- Location: Su'ao, Yilan County, Taiwan
- Coordinates: 24°36′55.14″N 121°49′22.32″E
- System: Train station
- Owner: Taiwan Railway Corporation
- Operator: Taiwan Railway Corporation
- Line: Eastern Trunk line
- Train operators: Taiwan Railway Corporation

Other information
- Station code: 068 ㄒㄇ

History
- Opened: 22 November 1920

Passengers
- 0 daily (2024)

Services
Preceding station	Taiwan Railway	Following station
Dongshan towards Badu	Eastern Trunk line	Su'aoxin towards Taitung
Location

Xinma (Chinese: 新馬車站; pinyin: Xīnmǎ Chēzhàn) is a railway station on the Taiwan Railway Yilan line. It is located in Su'ao Township, Yilan County, Taiwan.

== History ==
The station was opened on 22 November 1920. The current station building was opened on 31 December 1970. Its distance between Su'aoxin Station is only 0.9km, the shortest distance between railway stations in Taiwan.

On 21 October 2018, a train derailment occurred at Xinma Station, killing 18 people and injuring 187. Due to the accident, the station was closed to passenger service on 31 May 2022, to reroute the Yilan line to a shallower curve.

== Structure ==
Sinma Station has a simple reinforced concrete structure building. The station is staffless and managed by nearby Su'aoxin Station.

== Around the station ==
- Wulaokeng Scenic Area

== See also ==
- List of railway stations in Taiwan
- 2018 Yilan train derailment
