= The Wreck of the Red Arrow =

Train derailment in 1947

Details
- Date: February 18, 1947; 3:21 am
- Location: Gallitzin, Pennsylvania
- Coordinates: 40°28′55″N 78°30′59″W
- Country: United States
- Operator: Pennsylvania Railroad
- Service: Eastbound Red Arrow #68
- Incident type: Derailment
- Cause: Overspeed caused by human error

Statistics
- Trains: 1
- Vehicles: 18
- Deaths: 24
- Injured: 138

The Wreck of the Red Arrow was a train derailment that occurred on February 18, 1947. The Red Arrow passenger train derailed in Gallitzin, Pennsylvania at a sharply approached curve, known as Bennington Curve, while descending in icy conditions. The accident would result in 24 deaths.

== Background ==
The Pennsylvania Railroad's train No. 68, better known as the Red Arrow, operated between Detroit, Michigan and New York City, with 14 cars (a railway post office car (#5473), a combine car (for both baggage & passengers) (#4758), 11 pullman cars (Full Coach Car / Passenger Coach #4289, Pullman Car Mc Carr, Pullman Car Shraders, Dining Car #7960, Pullman Sleeper East Alton (New York Central), Pullman Sleeper Ogden Canyon (Union Pacific), Pullman Cascade Timber, Pullman Dixie Land, Pullman Francis Hopkinson, & Passenger Coach 4013), & a baggage freight car (passenger express car 5959)) to carry and accommodate passengers, baggage, and mail. At the time of derailment, the trainset was hauled by 2 type K4 steam locomotives with automatic / mechanical stokers (422 & 3771): the train's regular power and an additional locomotive to handle the heavy Appalachian Mountains grades.

The train started its route in Detroit around 8:30 am on February 17th. The main engineer of this trip was Michael S. Bilig, an experienced worker with over 25 years of service at the Pennsylvania Railroad.

== Accident ==
At some time early in the morning, around 3 am, the Red Arrow had entered a patch of track near Altoona, Pennsylvania, known as the Bennington Curve. The weather conditions were icy and cold.

=== Bennington Curve ===
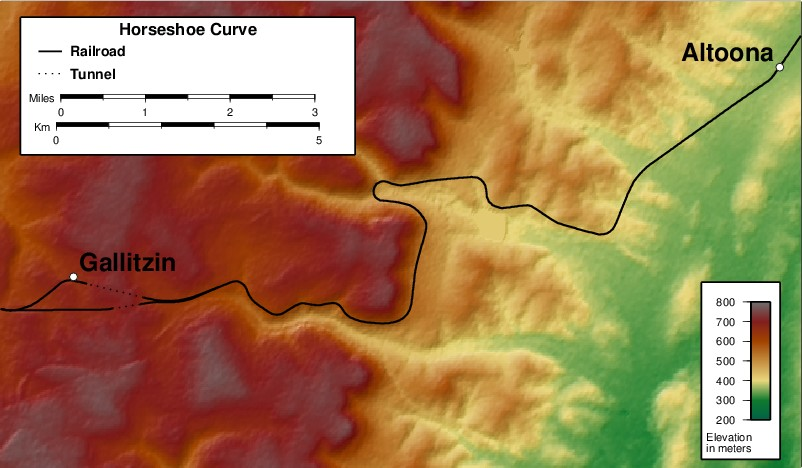
Map showing the Bennington Curve

The area of track known as Bennington Curve is a horseshoe curved patch of track along the PRR mainline as it crosses the Allegheny Mountains. Before approaching Bennington Curve, engineers were required to stop to ensure sufficient brake power before proceeding. The Red Arrow complied with the rule and came to a complete stop, then continued east onto the downgrade. The speed limit when descending was listed as 30 mph.

=== Loss of control and derailment ===
As the Red Arrow descended down the slope, Bilig peeked out the window of his cabin while descending. Bilig realized that the Red Arrow was gaining too much speed and applied the air brakes. Nevertheless, the train continued to accelerate and eventually reached a speed of around 65 to 70 mph.

At those speeds, derailment at Bennington Curve was inevitable. The first locomotive tipped over and slid down an embankment, taking the second engine with it. 11 of the cars following also jumped track. 5 also slid down the embankment, careening into each other.

== Aftermath ==
The result of the wreck was an immediate sight of twisted steel and carnage. Thousands of pieces of mail were scattered along the hillside and many of the passengers were trapped in the overturned carriages.

=== Rescue and recovery ===
Because of the remote location of the crash, ambulances, fire crews, and other rescue teams were forced to hike on foot to access the scene. Many of the victims succumbed to their injuries after being extracted from the wreck while rescuers were carrying them back to the main roads.

In the following days, postal workers were also sent to this site to painstakingly retrieve all items of lost mail that were scattered along the mountainside.

=== Casualties ===
A total of 24 people were killed in the wreck. A further 138 were injured in the accident. With emergency centers being too far away, makeshift hospitals were created in the Penn Alto Hotel and the United Service Organization's Canteen. These would operate as the initial care sites, but also as temporary morgues.

Of the 4 crewmen of the two front engines, Bilig would be the only survivor, having been flung out of the cabin as the train began to topple. An additional 6 crew members were killed, with the other 15 fatalities all being passengers. The majority of passenger fatalities would come from an overcrowded passenger and baggage combine car; during recovery efforts, it was nicknamed "the death car".

=== Second derailment ===
On February 28th, just ten days after the main derailment, another train was passing through this location when a second tragedy struck. The rear Pullman car of the joint MoPac-PRR Sunshine Special uncoupled from the train and started descending the curve without any means of braking. It would derail at the same location as the Red Arrow, killing 1 and injuring another 12.

=== Inquiry ===
Bilig had initially testified that he had taken all appropriate precautions and that the train had struck an obstacle on the tracks which caused this derailment. However, the investigation into this matter showed there was no signs that this had happened. A further interview with Bilig revealed what is likely the actual cause.

As the train had descended down the incline, the throttle was supposed to be shut allowing the train to idle down the slope with the help of its brakes. However Bilig likely left the throttle partly opened. This additional motive power besides the additional speed being caused by the gravity of the slope caused the train to accelerate faster than Bilig expected; this, mixed with the icy conditions on the rails meant that the train could not be controlled through the use of brakes. Bilig would be found at fault for the accident, but no criminal charges were ever filed. Bilig ultimately remained with the company until his retirement.

== Legacy ==
The image of the Pennsylvania was greatly affected by this wreck and the secondary derailment. By 1960, the Red Arrow was no longer in use. The Railroaders Memorial Museum, created in 1980, has served to educate the public and preserve artifacts related to the history of this disaster.
