= Brühl train derailment =

2000 railway incident in Germany

Coordinates: 50°49′47″N 6°54′45″E

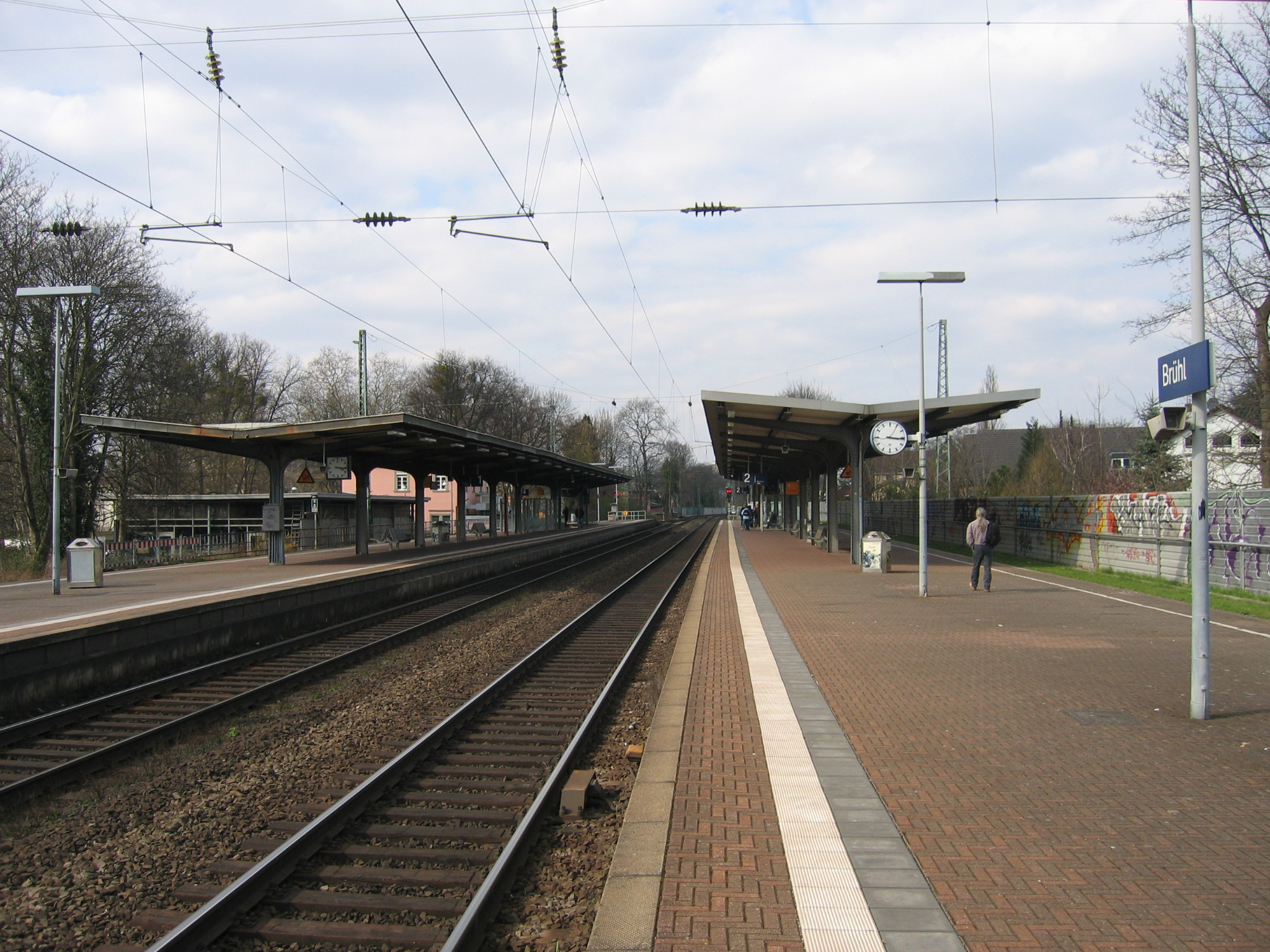
- Brühl railway station, the passing siding on the right was removed after the accident

Details
- Date: 6 February 2000; 00:13
- Location: Brühl station, NRW
- Country: Germany
- Line: Left Rhine line
- Incident type: Derailment
- Cause: Misinterpretation of debatable signalling

Statistics
- Trains: 1
- Deaths: 9
- Injured: 149
Route map

On 6 February 2000, a train at the Brühl railway station on the West Rhine Railway derailed negotiating a low-speed turnout at three times the correct speed, killing 9 people.

== Incident ==
The Brühl railway station is a minor station on the double-tracked West Rhine railway line. At the time of the accident, it had two passing sidings, one on each side of the through lines. The station is equipped for limited bi-directional running: the passing sidings had exit signals on both ends while the through lines had exit signals only for the main direction. A train passing the station on the "wrong" line therefore had to use the passing siding rather than the main running line unless a specific written order was issued.

The through lines are rated for operation at 160 km/h (100 mph), while the switches into the passing sidings are rated for 40 km/h (25 mph).

Substitute signal Zs1

On the night of the accident the southbound line was closed for maintenance work at the Brühl Güterbahnhof (Brühl goods/freight station) north of the passenger station. Trains going south switched to the opposite (northbound) line at Hürth Kalscheuren. Since the entry signal at Brühl could only show a green-yellow (Hp2, "proceed with low speed") aspect when the route switched to the main signals in the freight station part (the opposite track didn't have any "destination signal" from the view of the tower as the other tracks have), all trains on the left track received a substitute signal Zs1, limiting the speed to 40 km/h till the next main signal. Two slow orders had also been issued to drivers, restricting speed in the area to:

- 120 km/h for the track running north, irrelevant to trains on this track running south because of the speed limit imposed by the substitute signal
- 90 km/h for the track running south, relevant for the time after construction would be finished and valid only for the regular (right) track where the work took place.

Before the accident, several trains had passed the construction site and negotiated the passing siding at Brühl without incident.

When the D 203 "Schweiz-Express" Amsterdam–Basel train entered the station area, the driver had slowed the train to 40 km/h as required. He then accelerated the train to 90 km/h. After clearing the construction site, he accelerated further. When the train reached the switch into the passing siding it was travelling at 122 km/h, three times the design speed of the switch. The locomotive derailed and slid down the embankment into a house. Some coaches followed the locomotive, while others slid over the platform and crashed into the support beams of the platform roof. Of the train's 201 passengers, 9 died and 149 were injured.

== Aftermath ==
After the accident, four persons were put on trial charged with "alleged involuntary manslaughter" (fahrlässige Körperverletzung mit Todesfolge) – the train driver, the editor of the drivers' bulletins, and two persons from the construction planning service. The station director was not charged.

The train driver testified that his interpretation of the driving information and the actual signalling suggested a maximum permitted speed of 120 km/h. One of the construction planning coordinators testified that he did mention a possible misinterpretation in a meeting allowing for a potential danger.

All four saw abatement of action after 23 days of trial – the judge concluded that the train driver had an instant lapse (Augenblicksversagen) that does not require a major penalty. The others are responsible for a debatable driving information and signalling recommendation which however was correct in theory – they just missed seeing the danger. The financial penalty was between 7,000 DM and 20,000 DM for the defendants.

== Investigation ==
Quoting from the investigation report (translated):

"[page 20] The fact that the operations recommendations included a hint to inform the train drivers by radio (which was unnecessary by the rules [added]) must be taken as an indicator that the editor of the operations recommendations was aware of the problematic situation and that he tried to compensate for the issue. [...] especially a missing appointment on who would be required to take this action, e.g. the train director. Additionally the operations recommendation is faulty as it had swapped the designations of the freight station and the passenger station."
"[page 48] ... it is a principal observation in railway operations that concurrent directives do occur that must be interpreted by situational context. The reconciliation of differing speed advisories is amongst the fundamental intellectual properties that a train driver must accomplish. The basic scheme is to proceed in a way to maximize safety."
"[page 46] The train drivers of the other [preceding] trains that were passing through Brühl station without halting were faced with the same operational conditions as the train driver of D203. Checking the event recorders of the trains a maximum of 48 km/h was observed in passage of Brühl station."
"[page 65] The radio protocols did show [..] there was no communication between train driver and train director [of the station]."
"[page 19] given the number of 69 trains it would have been necessary to install a possibility to control the speed with an inductive train protection system. Its costs would have been proportionate and reasonable given the overall costs of the constructional measure."

== Similar accidents ==
- Milton rail crash, United Kingdom – overspeed through turnout
- Bourne End rail crash, United Kingdom – overspeed through turnout
- Goswick rail crash, United Kingdom – overspeed through turnout
- Waterfall rail accident, Australia – overspeed through sharp curve
- Sutton Coldfield rail crash, United Kingdom – overspeed through curve

== See also ==
- List of rail accidents (2000–2009)
