= Slow order =

Local speed restriction on a rail line

A slow order is a local speed restriction on a rail line that is set below the track's normal speed limit.

Slow orders are usually imposed by railway dispatchers for sections of track that are in some way deficient or when there is a requirement to perform maintenance on a section of railway.

Slow orders are employed whenever continuous welded rail has some sort of derail or danger condition, such as an open critical joint, joints close to a bridge or movable bridge, or issues with settling ballast. Sometimes, slow orders are imposed because of rail geometry defects or snow accumulations.

When maintenance workers wish to work under dispatcher protection without a designated "window" of time where no trains are allowed to run, they typically post flags at either end of the section on which they will be working, and a slow order is posted on the track.

Since slow orders tend to disrupt timetables and can affect time-sensitive shipments, railroads try to get them cleared as soon as is safely possible.

== Around the world ==
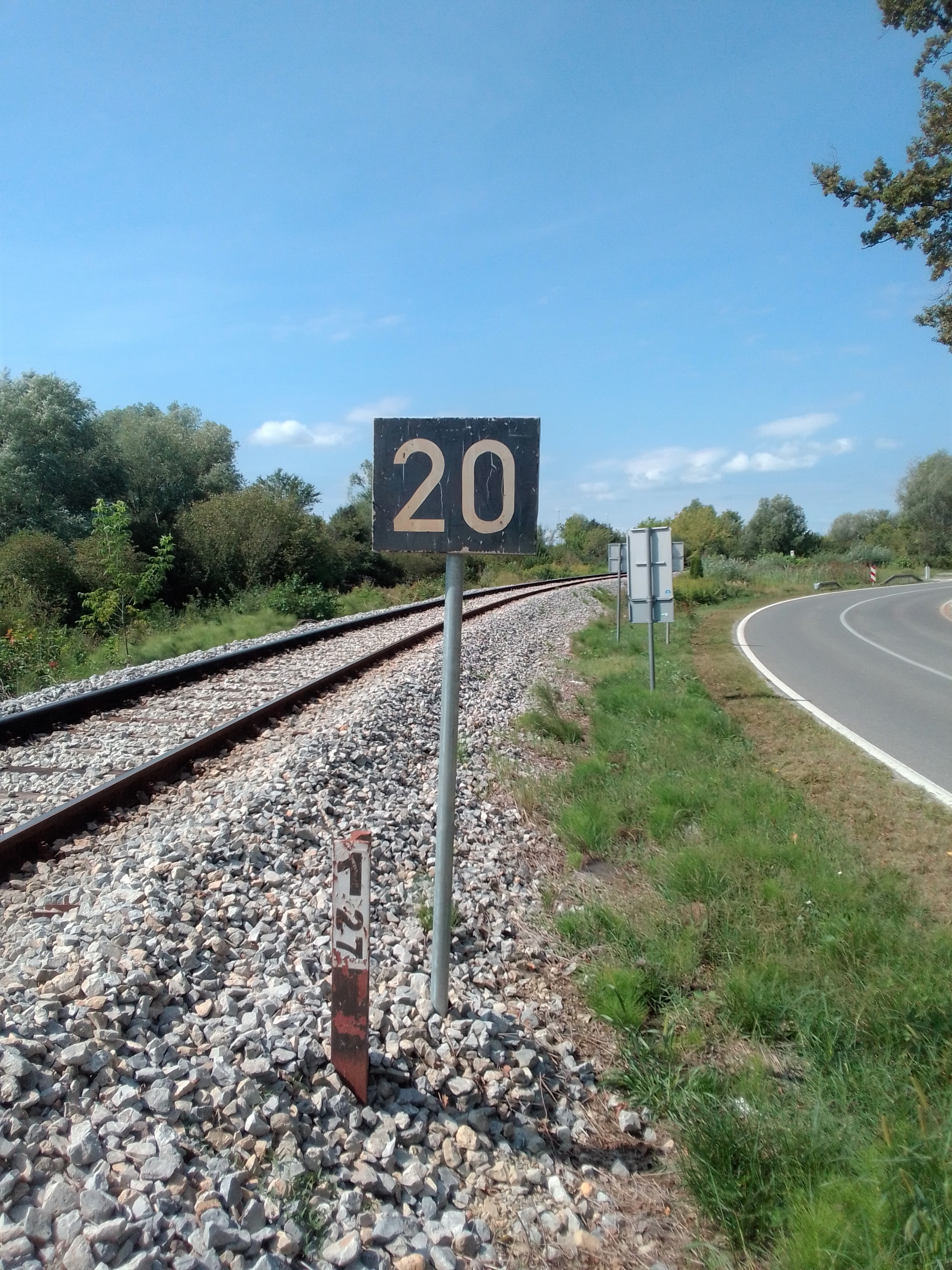
Signal "Beginning of slow order" in Bračak, Croatia

=== Croatia ===
On Croatian Railways, slow order is signaled with the following signs:

1 – Signal "Slow" (Croatian: Lagano) – round yellow board with a white border. This sign warns the train driver that he is approaching the part of the track where the slow order is installed. The board is placed at the beginning of the braking path to the point where the slow order begins.

2 – Signal "Beginning of slow order" (Croatian: Početak lagane vožnje) – white alphanumeric number on a black square board – indicates the place of the start of slow order. The number on the board shows maximum permitted speed over the slow order section in kilometers per hour.

3 – Revocation signal (Croatian: Opozivni signal) – round green board with a white border – indicates the place of the end of slow order. The driver may accelerate the train to regular speed only after the last axle of the last vehicle in the train composition has passed this sign.

=== United States ===
In June 2022, the Coast Line between Camarillo and San Luis Obispo was subject to a slow order issued by the Union Pacific Railroad due to malfunctioning grade crossing signals. As such, Pacific Surfliner trains experienced delays of up to 30 minutes since trains were required to slow down to 20 mph (32 km/h) at most grade crossings.
