= Finnish railway signalling =

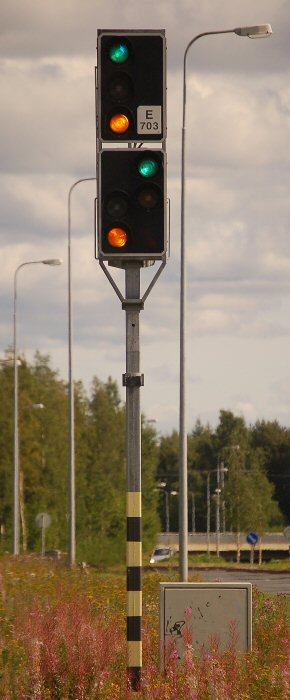
A main and distant signal combined in a single post. The main signal (upper) is showing the Proceed 35 aspect and the distant signal shows the Expect 35 aspect.

The signalling system used on the railway network in Finland comprises color-light signals and fixed signs, used together with the Automatic Train Control system ATP-VR/RHK (an EBICAB 900 system better known as JKV, Finnish: junakulunvalvonta).

== Main signals ==
The main signal can have any of the following aspects:

Aspect	Meaning	Old system (Helsinki area)
Stop	The signal must not be passed.	
Proceed	The signal may be passed with the maximum allowed speed.	
Proceed 35	The signal may be passed and the maximum speed of 35 km/h (22 mph) is in effect from the next switch, which may lead to a diverging route. An ATC cab display may authorize a higher speed, typically 80 km/h (50 mph). The speed is in effect until the next main signal or after leaving the station area. The route may also lead to an occupied track section, but only if the driver has received a preliminary announcement.	

If a main signal doesn't protect any switches or the speed restriction on a diverging route is the same as the straight route, the signal doesn't need to show the Proceed 35 aspect and therefore the yellow bottom light may be absent. The two lamp version of the old system has the lights reversed, i.e. red at the top and green at the bottom.

== Distant signals ==
The distant signal is located at least 1,200 metres (3,900 ft) before the main signal. It may also be located in the same post with a main signal, below it. In this combined arrangement, whenever the main signal shows a stop aspect, the distant signal doesn't show any aspect at all.

A distant signal can have any of the following aspects:

Aspect	Meaning	Old system (Helsinki area)
Expect Stop	The next signal shows the Stop aspect. The train route may also be set to a track section without further signals, e.g. toward unsignalled line or a buffer stop.	
Expect 35	The next main signal shows the Proceed 35 aspect.	
Expect Proceed	The next signal shows the aspect Proceed.	

Note: Although the green light of the old system distant signal used in Helsinki area is named Expect Proceed aspect, the next main signal may in fact be showing the Proceed 35 aspect. Therefore, the driver has to act as if the signal aspect is indeed Expect 35.

== Block signals ==
A block signal can show any of the following three aspects:

Aspect	Meaning
Stop	The signal must not be passed.
Proceed, expect stop	The signal may be passed. The next main or block signal is showing a Stop aspect.
Proceed	The next main or block signal is showing a permitting aspect. The following two blocks are not occupied.

Block signals are being replaced by combinations of main and distant signals, and no new block signals will be installed.

== Dwarf signals ==
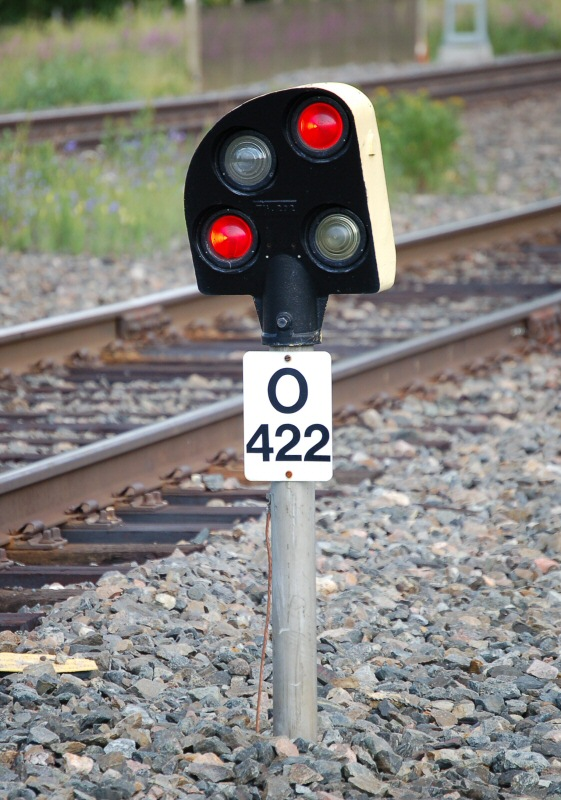
A dwarf signal showing the Stop aspect

A dwarf signal is used for controlling shunting movements. It can have any of the following aspects:

Aspect	Meaning
Stop	The signal must not be passed.
Proceed	The signal may be passed

A dwarf signal may also be placed in conjunction with a main signal. If the main signal shows any other aspect than Stop, the dwarf signal shows the Proceed aspect.

== Bridge signals ==
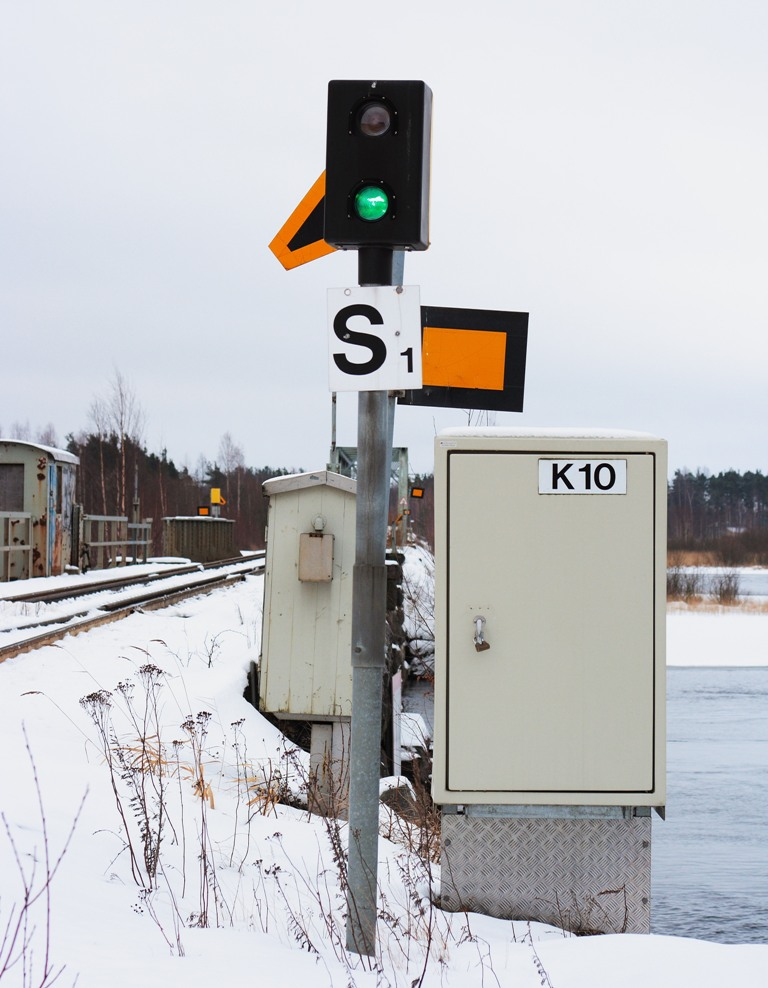
A bridge signal showing the Proceed aspect

Bridge signals are small signals used to display the orientation of a moveable bridge. They can have any of the following aspects:

Aspect	Meaning
Stop	The bridge is open and the signal must not be passed.
Signal cancelled	The bridge is closed and the signal may be passed.
Proceed	The signal may be passed.

== Repeaters ==
Repeaters are sometimes used to repeat the aspect of the main signal in the Helsinki area in places where the main signal is not clearly visible.

Aspect	Meaning
	The main signal is showing the Stop aspect.
	The main signal is showing some Proceed aspect. The train can be moved to the main signal.

== Helsinki Metro ==
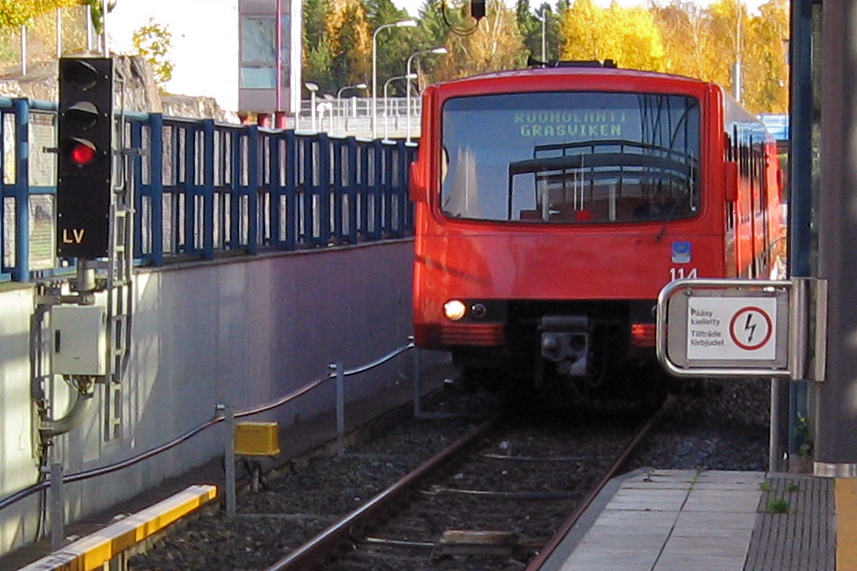
A stop signal is shown at Rastila as a train enters the station.

The Helsinki Metro signals differ from those used by the railways.

=== Main signals ===
Some aspects may be shown using a signal with only three lights, pictured on the right.

Aspect	Meaning
Stop	The signal must not be passed.
Proceed	The signal may be passed with the maximum allowed speed.
Proceed 35	The signal may be passed. Speed limit after the signal is 35 km/h (22 mph). The train may enter a diverging track through a switch.
Coupling	The signal may be passed, but the track may be occupied or is an ending track. Speed limit after the signal is 20 km/h (12 mph).
Exception	Drive at driver's responsibility. Speed limit after the signal is 35 km/h (22 mph).

=== Distant signals ===
Aspect	Meaning
Expect other than Proceed	The next main signal is showing one of the aspects Stop, Proceed 35, Exception or Coupling.
Expect Proceed	The next main signal is showing the Proceed aspect.
