= 1991 Miaoli train collision =

Railway incident in Taiwan

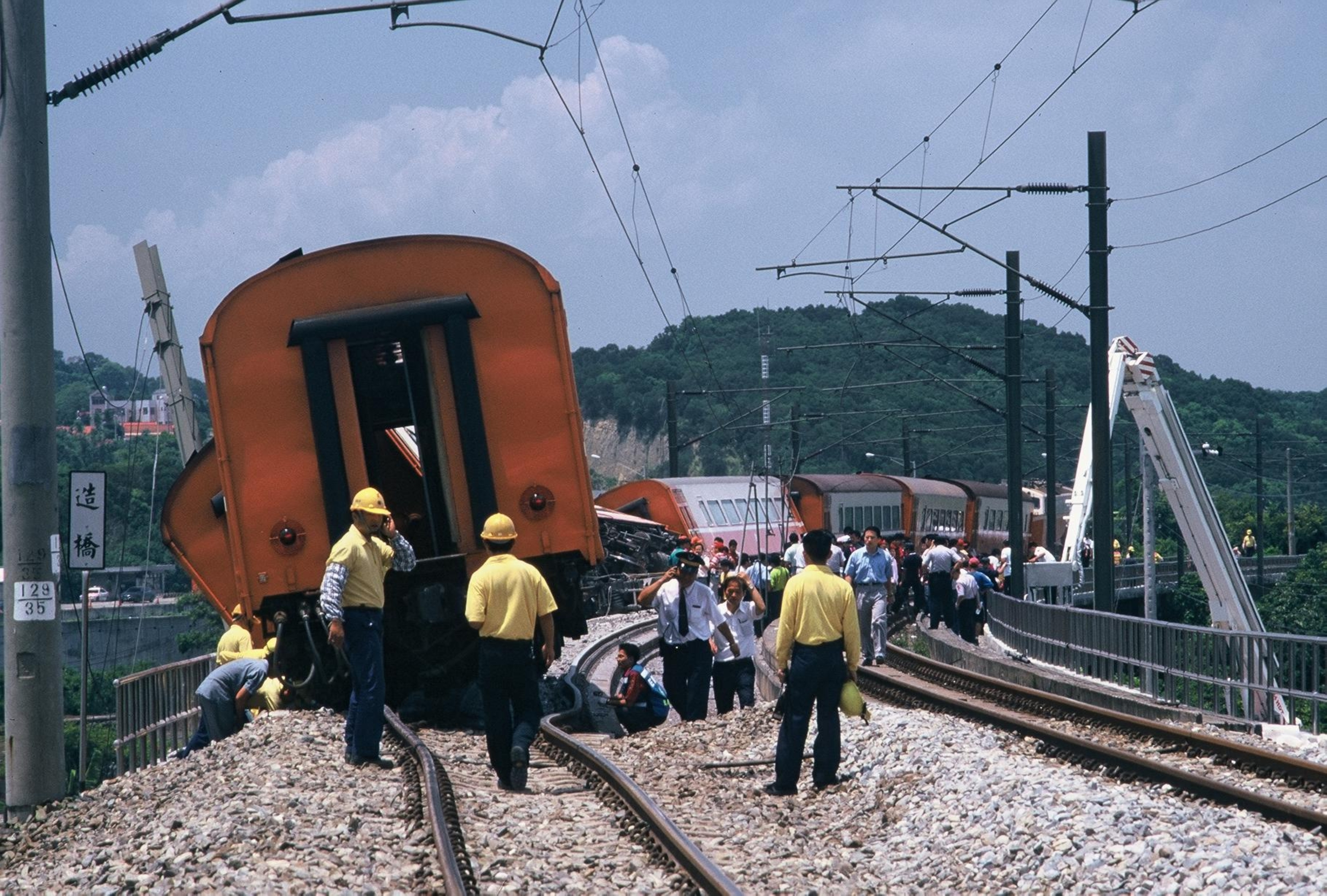

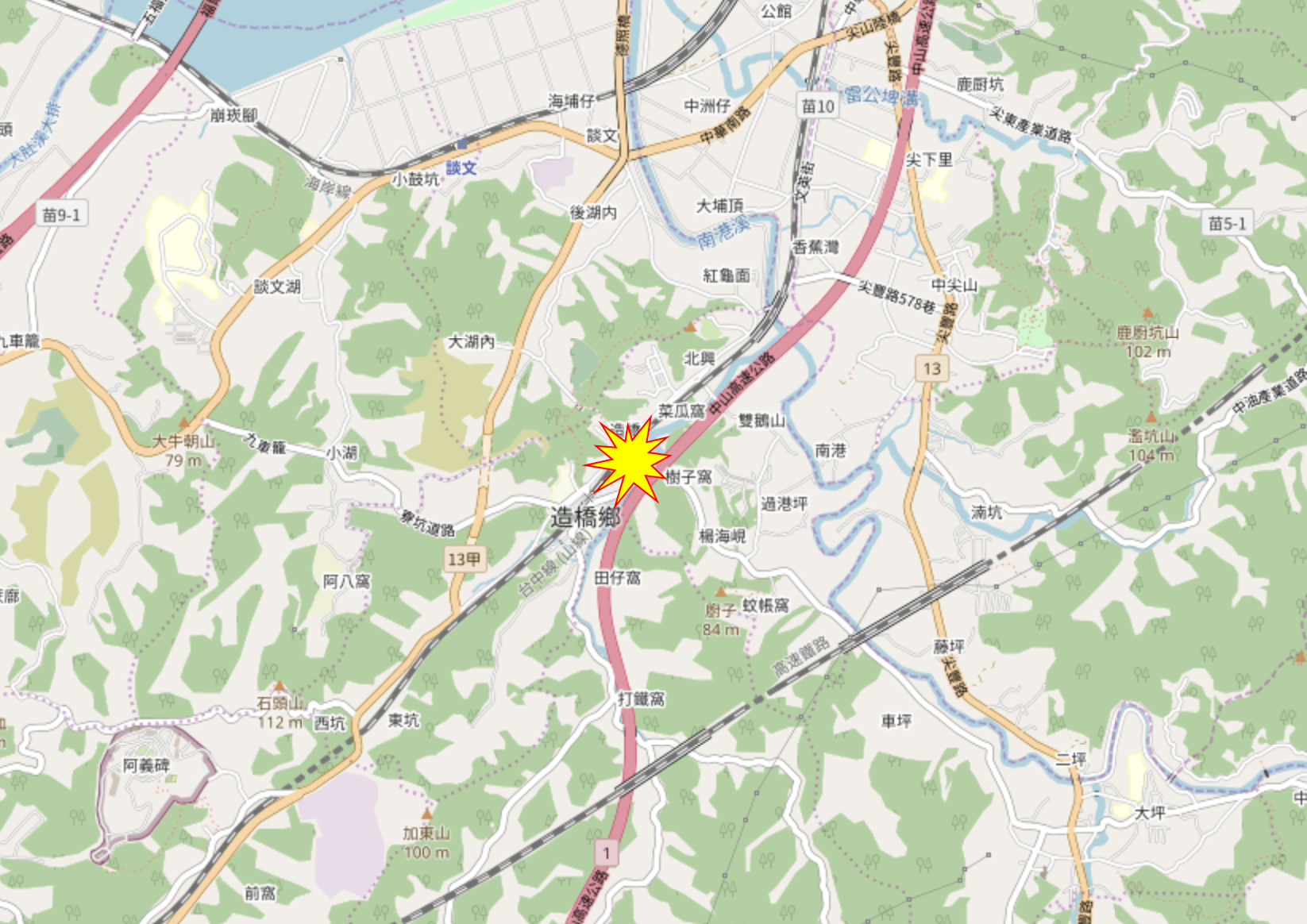

Details
- Date: 15 November 1991; 34 years ago About 16:00 local time
- Location: Zaoqiao, Miaoli County
- Coordinates: 24°39′58″N 120°50′5″E
- Country: Taiwan
- Line: Taichung Line
- Operator: Taiwan Railways Administration
- Incident type: Collision
- Cause: ATS failure

Statistics
- Trains: 2
- Deaths: 30
- Injured: 112

On 15 November 1991, two passenger trains collided in Miaoli County, Taiwan, killing 30 people and injuring 112. It was the deadliest train accident in Taiwan since 1948 until April 2021 when 49 passengers were killed after a train derailed in Hualien.

== Incident ==
Location of Collision

At about 16:00 (UTC+8), EMU100 series Tze-Chiang (T.C) 1006 Train and Chu-Kuang (C.K) 1 Train collided. Chu-Kuang 1 was turning into the centre of the secondary line but Tze-Chiang 1006 lost its control. The signal of K134 Station was green, so the driver of Tze-Chiang 1006 Train did not notice anything wrong. When he noticed the unusual condition, it was too late. The first three carriages of Tze-Chiang 1006 crushed to the antepenultimate carriage of Chu-Kuang 1 and all of the six carriages turned over onto the ground. The accident caused 30 deaths and 112 injuries. Tze-Chiang 40ED102、40ET101 and Chu-Kuang 35FPK10207、35FPK10209 were all scrapped. There were many Japanese passengers among the casualty, including Congressman Hideaki Oshiro (大城秀昭).

== Investigation ==
The reason for this crash was because of the automatic train stop (ATS) emergency braking system. The ATS of the Tze-Chiang 1006 was not working, so it did not stop before crashing to the Chu-Kuang 1.

Also, Taiwan Railway dispatched cranes and lifted the bogies, and at the same time investigated the cause of the accident from the mechanical parts of the signal, track conversion, and self-propelled operation or if there were some human factors. Taiwan Rail way also simulated and restored the train collision which saw the Tze-Chiang 1006 train crushing the Chu-Kuang 1 train and all three carriages of the Chu-Kuang train were all crushed heavily. Mr. Chen Shifang, the railroad chief who just took office four months ago, initially excluded the disabled part. He said: "There are no problems of signal. The collision was because the train did not slow down, all the responsibility were all on drivers."

The direction of the survey points to human error, and Huashi had an exclusive interview with the injured driver of Tze-Chiang. The automatic braking system was actually installed but had failed at that time, so it needed to be repaired in advance. The train driver felt wronged. The whole incident showed that the machine and human conditions were both fine, but injured people and the bereaved were all unsatisfied with this result, so the Taiwan Railway Administrator had to investigate faster. Finally, the result was because the ATS system had broken down. The driver and the railroad chief were sentenced to involuntary homicide.

== Aftermath ==
After the accident, Premier of the Executive Yuan Hau Pei-tsun and Chairman of the Taiwan Provincial Government Lien Chan went to condole every passenger and gave them NT$3 million as compensation.

Chen Shifang and the Tze Chiang train driver Su Jinkun (蘇金焜) were both prosecuted for professional negligence. Su was sent to jail for four years and Chen was acquitted.
