= Rail accidents at Morpeth =

Rail accident blackspot in England

Coordinates: 55°09′40″N 1°41′09″W

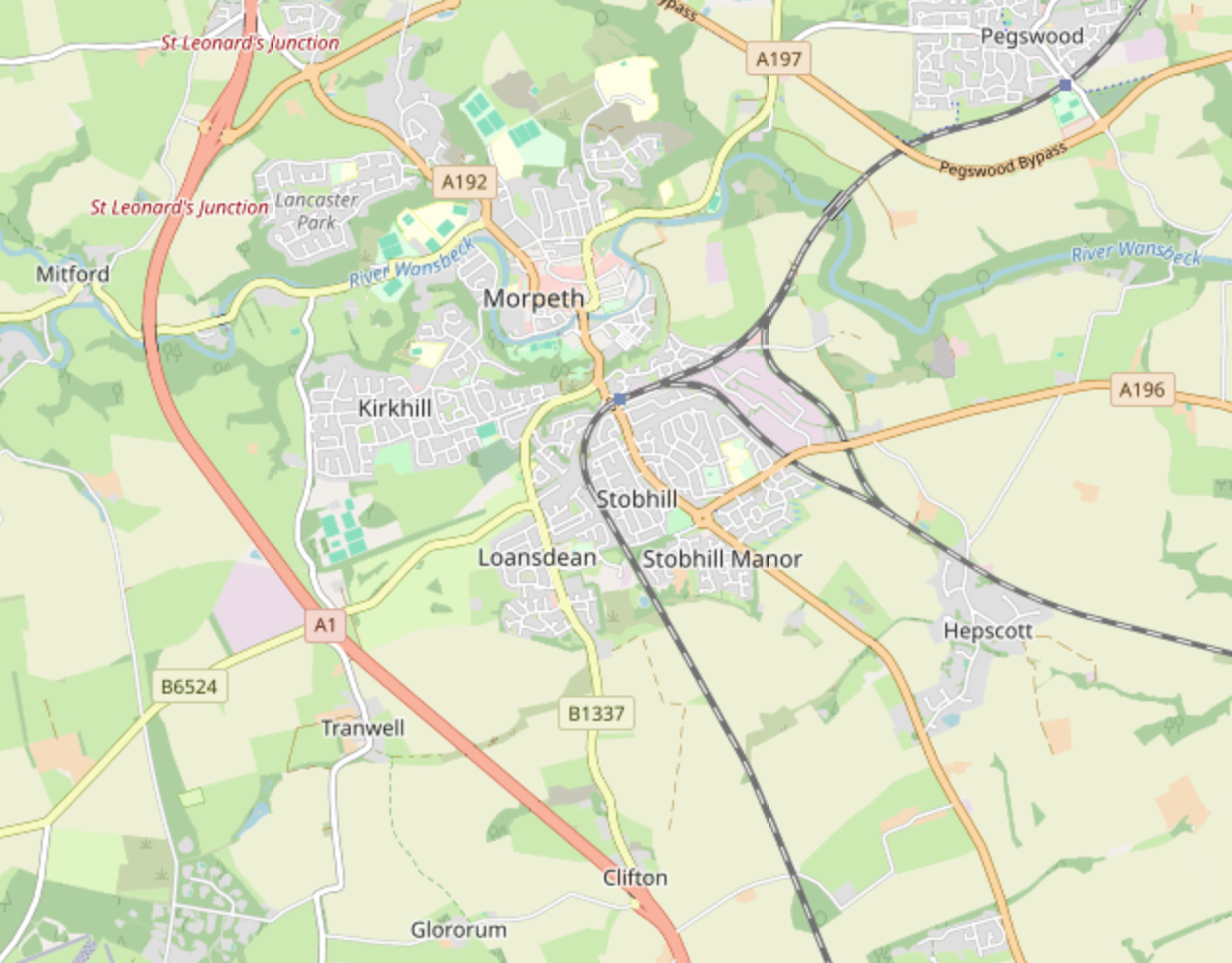
Map of the Morpeth, Northumberland area as of December 2024. The striped-grey line is the Morpeth curve.

The town of Morpeth in Northumberland, England, has what is reputed to be the tightest curve (17 chains or 340 metres radius) of any main railway line in Britain. The track turns approximately 98° from a northwesterly to an easterly direction immediately west of Morpeth Station on an otherwise fast section of the East Coast Main Line railway. This was a major factor in three serious derailments between 1969 and 1994. The curve has a permanent speed restriction of 50 miles per hour (80 km/h).

== 1877 derailment ==
Morpeth derailment (1877)

Details
- Date: 25 March 1877
- Location: Morpeth, Northumberland
- Country: England
- Line: East Coast Main Line
- Cause: Defective track

Statistics
- Trains: 1
- Deaths: 5
- Injured: 17

On 25 March 1877, the 10:30 p.m. train from Edinburgh to London Kings Cross was derailed on the curve. It was travelling at only 25 miles per hour (40 km/h). The officer from the Railway Inspectorate who held the inquiry, Captain Henry Tyler, found that faulty track was to blame. He also commented observantly "It would obviously be better if a deviation line could be constructed, to avoid the use of such a sharp a curve on a main line". This "deviation line" has still not yet been built 149 years later.

== 1969 derailment ==
Morpeth derailment (1969)

Details
- Date: 7 May 1969; 01:31
- Location: Morpeth, Northumberland
- Country: England
- Line: East Coast Main Line
- Cause: Overspeed on curve

Statistics
- Trains: 1
- Passengers: 206
- Deaths: 6
- Injured: 46

On 7 May 1969 a northbound Aberdonian sleeping car express train from London to Aberdeen derailed on the curve. The train in question consisted of Deltic locomotive The Royal Northumberland Fusiliers hauling 11 carriages. Six people were killed, 21 were injured and the roof of the station's northbound platform was damaged. The train had been travelling at 84 miles per hour (135 km/h). The driver had apparently allowed his attention to wander because he was thinking about an official letter that he had been handed when booking on duty, asking for an explanation of time lost on a previous journey.

The investigation into this accident led to the implementation of alerts for major speed restrictions via the Automatic Warning System. However, despite the recommendation for this system stemming from the accident at Morpeth and the common reference to the 'Morpeth warnings', the gradually stepped speed restriction for the Morpeth curve did not meet the guidelines for this system and it was not installed until at least after the 1984 derailment.

== 1984 derailment ==
Morpeth derailment (1984)

Details
- Date: 24 June 1984; 00:41
- Location: Morpeth, Northumberland
- Country: England
- Line: East Coast Main Line
- Cause: Overspeed on curve

Statistics
- Trains: 1
- Deaths: 0
- Injured: 35

The southbound sleeper service from Aberdeen to London was derailed at the same location on 24 June 1984. There were no fatalities but 29 passengers and 6 train crew were injured. Two houses narrowly escaped being demolished by the derailed carriages. The train was estimated to have been travelling at 85 to 90 mph (137 to 145 km/h).

The train involved was led by Class 47 locomotive number 47452, hauling seven British Rail Mark 3 sleeping cars between two British Railways Mark 1 brake vans.

The driver involved in this accident, Peter Allan, was prosecuted for being under the influence of alcohol, but acquitted after what was described by the Expert Witness Institute as an ambush defence. Mr Allan had consumed alcohol both before and after booking on duty, but the defence countered that he suffered from bronchitis and had in the past experienced severe coughing fits that had caused him to fall unconscious.

== 1992 accident ==
Morpeth (1992) rail crash

Details
- Date: 13 November 1992
- Location: Morpeth
- Country: England
- Cause: Mis-communication between driver and signaller

Statistics
- Trains: 2
- Deaths: 1

A further accident, unrelated to the Morpeth curve, occurred on 13 November 1992, when a collision between two freight trains at Morpeth led to one fatality. A Class 56 locomotive ran into the back of a pipe train. The cab of the locomotive was crushed and the driver was killed. The accident occurred during engineering work and was the result of the locomotive driver and the signaller at Morpeth failing to come to a clear understanding concerning required movements.

== 1994 derailment ==
Morpeth (1994) rail crash

Details
- Date: 27 June 1994
- Location: Morpeth, Northumberland
- Country: England
- Cause: Overspeed on curve

Statistics
- Trains: 1
- Deaths: 0
- Injured: 1

On 27 June 1994 an express parcels train crashed at the curve. The locomotive and the majority of carriages overturned, without fatalities, but causing injury to the driver. As with the 1969 and 1984 accidents, the train had been travelling at 80 mph (130 km/h). The Health and Safety Executive estimate that trains will overturn at above 75 mph (120 km/h), and noted that "Morpeth 1994 was a very serious event, which could easily have been fatal".

== See also ==
- List of British rail accidents
- List of rail accidents (worldwide)
