= John Masson Gulland =

Scottish chemist and biochemist (1898–1947)

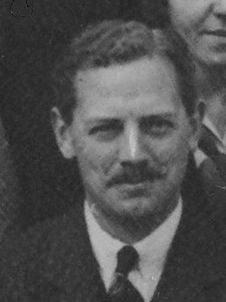
John Masson Gulland (1933)

John Masson Gulland FRS FRSE FRIC (14 October 1898 – 26 October 1947) was a Scottish chemist and biochemist. His main work was on nucleic acids, morphine and aporphine alkaloids. His work at University College Nottingham on electrometric titration was important in leading to the discovery of the DNA double helix by James Watson and Francis Crick, and he was described as "a great nucleic acid chemist." He established the Scottish Seaweed Research Association and the Lace Research Council.

== Life ==
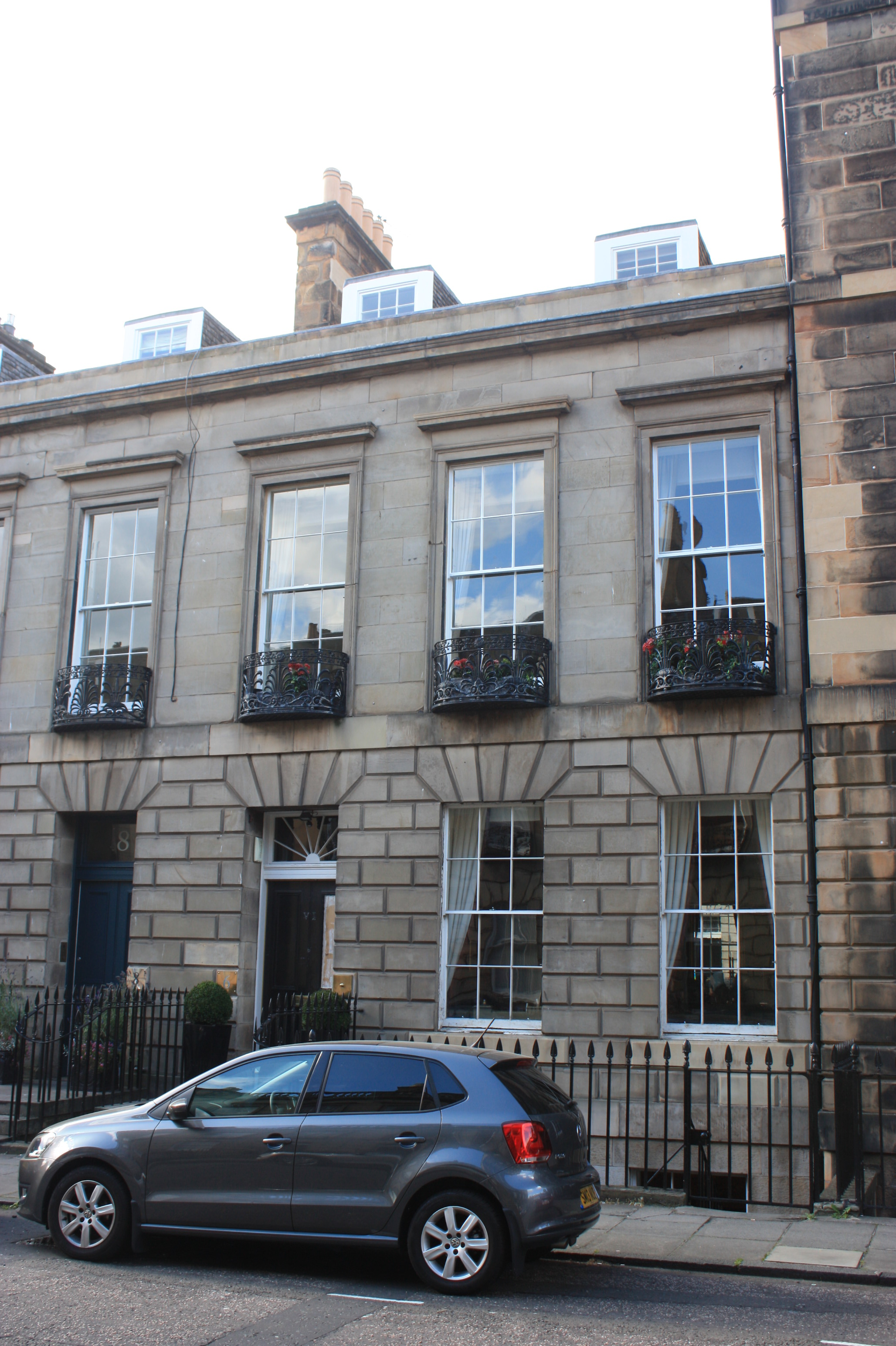
6 Alva Street, Edinburgh, Gulland's birthplace

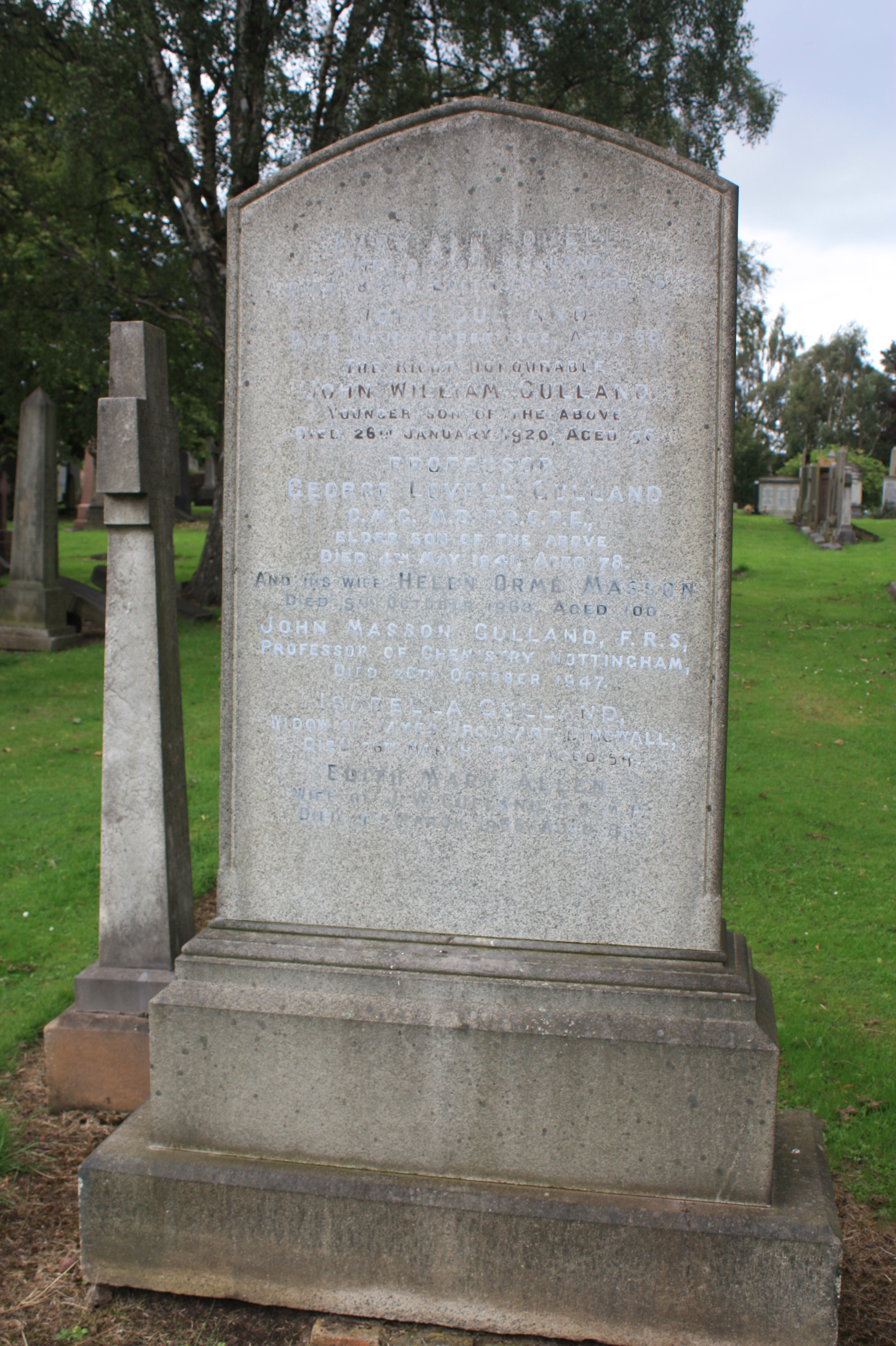
The grave of John Masson Gulland, Grange Cemetery, Edinburgh

Gulland was born at 6 Alva Street in Edinburgh's West End, the only son of Helen Orme Masson and Dr. George Lovell Gulland. His maternal grandparents were David Masson and suffrage campaigner Emily Rosaline Orme, his maternal uncle was David Orme Masson and maternal aunts Flora Masson and Rosaline Masson. His paternal uncle was John William Gulland MP. His father later became Professor of Medicine at the University of Edinburgh.

He attended Edinburgh Academy 1906 to 1917 and was then conscripted into the army in the First World War. He applied for a commission and served as a 2nd Lieutenant in the Royal Engineers. He was assigned to the Divisional Signals Company and saw little if any enemy action. After the war he graduated with a BSc from the University of Edinburgh in 1921. He then won a Carnegie Research Scholarship and undertook further studies at the University of St Andrews (PhD 1925) and the University of Manchester. He worked in both places with Professor Robert Robinson with whom he would also later work at the Dyson Perrins Laboratory at the University of Oxford from where he graduated MA. He became a demonstrator in chemistry in the University of Oxford in 1924, and in 1926 was appointed as a Lecturer based at Balliol College.

In 1927 he was elected a Fellow of the Royal Society of Edinburgh. His proposers were Sir James Walker, George Barger, Alexander Lauder, and Ralph Allan Sampson. In 1931 he moved to the University of London as a Reader in Biochemistry, also acting then as Senior Biochemist to the Lister Institute. In 1936 he moved to University College Nottingham as Professor of Chemistry (the Jesse Boot Chair).

In the Second World War he worked for the Ministry of Home Security as Gas Advisor 1939 to 1943 and the Ministry of Supply 1943 to 1945. He was elected a Fellow of the Royal Society of London in 1945.

In 1947 he became Research Director for the Institute of Brewing. His career was cut short when he was killed in the Goswick rail crash near Berwick-on-Tweed, aged 49.

He is buried in the Grange Cemetery in south Edinburgh with his parents and uncle, John William Gulland.

== Gulland and DNA ==
Gulland played a pivotal role in some of the research which led to the decoding of DNA by Watson and Crick in 1953. The Nottingham team, which included his colleagues Denis Jordan, Cedric Threlfall, and Michael Creeth, produced three papers in 1947: one led to high quality non-degraded DNA samples extracted without using acids or alkalis, the next measured the viscosity of DNA and the third proved the all-important hydrogen bond structures within it.

Five years later Watson dismissed the Nottingham team’s work incorrectly, and it took a year for him to realise his mistake. Eventually however "...a rereading of J. M. Gulland's and D. O. Jordan's papers...made me finally realize the strength of their conclusion that a large fraction, if not all, of the bases formed hydrogen bonds to other bases." Once Watson had recognised the key role of the hydrogen bonds then the decoding of DNA seems to have come within about a week or ten days.

The Nottingham team’s work was also acknowledged in the first papers concerning the decoding of DNA by Rosalind Franklin and Raymond Gosling who reported that "Gulland and his collaborators … showed that … CO and NH2 groups of the bases are inaccessible … whereas the phosphate groups are fully accessible."

Following these early citations rather less attention was given to the significance of the work of Gulland and his colleagues. By the time of the DNA decoding in 1953 events had moved on with the break-up of the Nottingham team: Gulland had moved on to become Research Director at the Institute of Brewing shortly before his untimely death in 1947, whilst Jordan and Creeth were both working outside the UK. However commemorations in 2010 and 2017 at the University of Nottingham posthumously acknowledged all their contributions, as did The Annotated and Illustrated Double Helix (2012).

There has been some speculative debate as to whether, if these events had turned out differently, the Nottingham team might have gone on to make the DNA decoding discovery themselves.

== Family ==
In 1924 he married Ruth Madeline Ida Russell, daughter of Sir James A. Russell. She was a fellow chemistry student whom he met in Edinburgh. They had two daughters.

His sister Flora Gulland married her cousin Irvine Masson.
