= Masson (surname) =

Masson is a French and Scottish surname. In Scotland, it is a form of the surname Mason. Historical evidence indicates that the origin of the surname is the occupation of mason. Másson is the Icelandic spelling.

== People with the surname ==
- André Masson (1896–1987), a French artist
- André Masson (born 1950), a French economist
- Angela Masson (born 1951), an American pilot and artist
- Antoine Masson (1636–1700), a French engraver
- Antoine Masson (boxer), a Belgian boxer
- Charles Eadie Masson (1884–1954), a Canadian amateur ice hockey right winger
- Charles François Philibert Masson (1762–1807), a private secretary to the future Tsar Alexander I
- Charles Masson (1800–1853), the pseudonym of James Lewis, a British East India Company soldier and explorer
- David Masson (1822–1907), a Scottish writer
- David I. Masson (1915–2007), a Scottish science-fiction writer and librarian, grandson of David Orme Masson
- David Orme Masson (1858–1937), an Australian chemist, son of David Masson
- David Parkes Masson (1847–1915), a wealthy banker in India and distinguished philatelist
- Didier Masson (1886–1950), a French pilot
- Diego Masson (born 1935), a French conductor, composer and percussionist
- Don Masson (born 1946), Scottish footballer
- Édouard Masson (1826–1875), a Canadian businessman and political figure
- Émile Masson (1888–1973), a Belgian professional road bicycle racer
- Émile Masson Jr. (1915–2011), a Belgian professional road bicycle racer, son of above
- Elsie Rosaline Masson (1890–1935), Australian photographer, writer and traveller, daughter of David Orme Masson
- Forbes Masson (born 1963), a Scottish actor
- Francis Masson (1741–1805), a Scottish botanist and gardener
- Frédéric Masson (1847–1923), a French historian
- Gérard Masson (born 1936), a French composer
- Hafliði Másson, Icelandic goði and chieftain
- Jean Papire Masson (1544–1611), a French scholar
- Jeffrey Moussaieff Masson (born 1941), a writer on Freudian psychoanalysis
- Joseph Masson (1791–1847), a Canadian businessman
- Laetitia Masson (born 1966), a French film director and screenwriter
- Maxime Masson (1867–1960), pastor for 52 years at the Catholic parish of Sainte-Thècle, Quebec, Canada
- Paul-Marie Masson (1882–1954), French composer and musicologist
- Paul Masson (1859–1940), a pioneer of California viticulture
- Paul Masson (1876–1944), a French cyclist and 1896 Summer Olympian
- Robert le Masson (1365–1443), a supporter of Joan of Arc
- Louis-Rodrigue Masson (1833–1903), a Canadian politician
- Snorri Másson (born 1997), Icelandic podcaster and politician
- Sophie Masson (born 1959), a French-Australian author
- Suzanne Masson (1901–1943), a French resistance fighter
- Thomas Lansing Masson (1866–1934), an American anthropologist, editor and author

== See also ==
- Mason (surname)
