= Irvine Masson =

Australian chemist (1887–1962)

- Born: James Irvine Orme Masson; 3 September 1887
- Died: 22 October 1962 (aged 75)
- Awards: Fellow of the Royal Society
- Scientific career
- Institutions: University of Sheffield

Sir James Irvine Orme Masson FRS FRSE MBE LLD (3 September 1887 – 22 October 1962), generally known as Irvine Masson, was an Australian-born chemist of Scots descent who was Vice-Chancellor of the University of Sheffield from 1938 to 1953. He is usually referred to in documents as J. I. O. Masson.

== Life ==
Irvine Masson was born in Toorak, near Melbourne, the son of Sir David Orme Masson a professor of chemistry at Melbourne University, and his wife, Mary Struthers. He went to Melbourne Grammar School then Melbourne University, achieving a BSc with first class honours in chemistry in 1908. He began medical studies, but reverted to chemistry and in 1910 took up a scholarship in the subject at University College London joining the staff in 1913.

During the First World War he did explosives research at the Royal Arsenal, Woolwich, a practical experience very different from his previous academic work, but which had a major influence on his future research.

After further time at University College, in 1924 he was made Professor of Chemistry at the University of Durham, also taking on the role of head of the Department of Pure Science. During this time he was lucky to survive one of his experiments which destroyed much of the laboratory. This administrative role led to his appointment as Vice-Chancellor of the University of Sheffield in 1938. However he combined this with running research on explosives during the Second World War.

In 1939 he was elected a Fellow of the Royal Society of London. He was knighted by King George VI in 1950. In 1953 he was elected a Fellow of the Royal Society of Edinburgh. His proposers were Arthur Holmes, Sir Godfrey Thomson, Sir Sydney A Smith, and John Edwin MacKenzie.

In 1952 he retired from Sheffield and moved to Edinburgh, where both he and his wife had other family connections.

He died in Edinburgh on 22 October 1962. He is buried in the Grange Cemetery in southern Edinburgh.

== Family ==
Masson was the paternal grandson of David Masson and Emily Rosaline Orme and maternal grandson of John Struthers. He was the nephew of Simon Somerville Laurie, Flora Masson and Rosaline Masson.

Masson was the brother of Marnie Bassett and Elsie Rosaline Masson.

In 1913 he married his first cousin, Flora Gulland (d.1960) sister of John Masson Gulland. Their children included David Irvine Masson

Academic offices
Preceded by Sir Arthur Pickard-Cambridge	Vice-Chancellor of the University of Sheffield; 1938–1953	Succeeded by John Macnaghten Whittaker
