= David I. Masson =

British science-fiction writer and librarian

David Irvine Masson (6 November 1915 – 27 February 2007) was a British science-fiction writer and librarian.

== Biography ==
Born in Edinburgh, Masson came from a distinguished family of academics and thinkers. His father, Sir Irvine Masson, was a professor of chemistry at Durham and vice-chancellor at Sheffield, his grandfather, Sir David O. Masson, emigrated to Australia and became professor of chemistry at Melbourne while his great-grandfather David M. Masson was professor of English literature at Edinburgh, wrote a biography of John Milton and was a friend of Thomas Carlyle and John Stuart Mill.

It was no great surprise, therefore, when Masson himself began a career in higher education. Following his graduation from Merton College, Oxford, with a degree in English language and literature he took on the post of assistant librarian at the University of Leeds in 1938.

Except for a stint in the Royal Army Medical Corps during the Second World War from 1940–46, Masson remained a librarian for the rest of his working life.

Following his demobilisation he took on the role of curator of special collections at Liverpool and married his wife, Olive Newton, in 1950 before returning to Leeds in 1956 to become curator of the Brotherton collection, an assemblage of (mostly) English literature including many rare books and manuscripts bequeathed to the University by Lord Brotherton of Wakefield on his death in 1930.

It was during his 23 years at Leeds that he wrote his most well known short stories. Traveller's Rest, published in 1965 in New Worlds magazine, introduced Masson to his audience; a study in the uselessness of war focusing on a soldier's perceptions of reality in combat, perhaps influenced by his own experiences twenty years earlier.

Six more stories followed, including A Two-Timer, the tale of a 17th-century man's revulsion at the modern, 20th-century world he finds himself in, before Masson ended his relationship with New Worlds.

These seven stories were collected as The Caltraps of Time in 1968. Just three more short stories followed after 1968. These were included in the 2003 re-issue of Caltraps.... Masson also wrote several articles on the functions and effects of phonetic sound-patterning in poetry between 1951 and 1991.

Masson retired in 1979 but continued to live in the city of Leeds with his wife. The couple had a daughter and three grandchildren. He died in Leeds on 27 February 2007.

== Bibliography ==
- The Caltraps of Time (1968)

=== Short stories ===
- "Not So Certain" (New Worlds, July 1967)
