= Hôtel de Ville, La Courneuve =

Town hall in La Courneuve, France

Hôtel de Ville
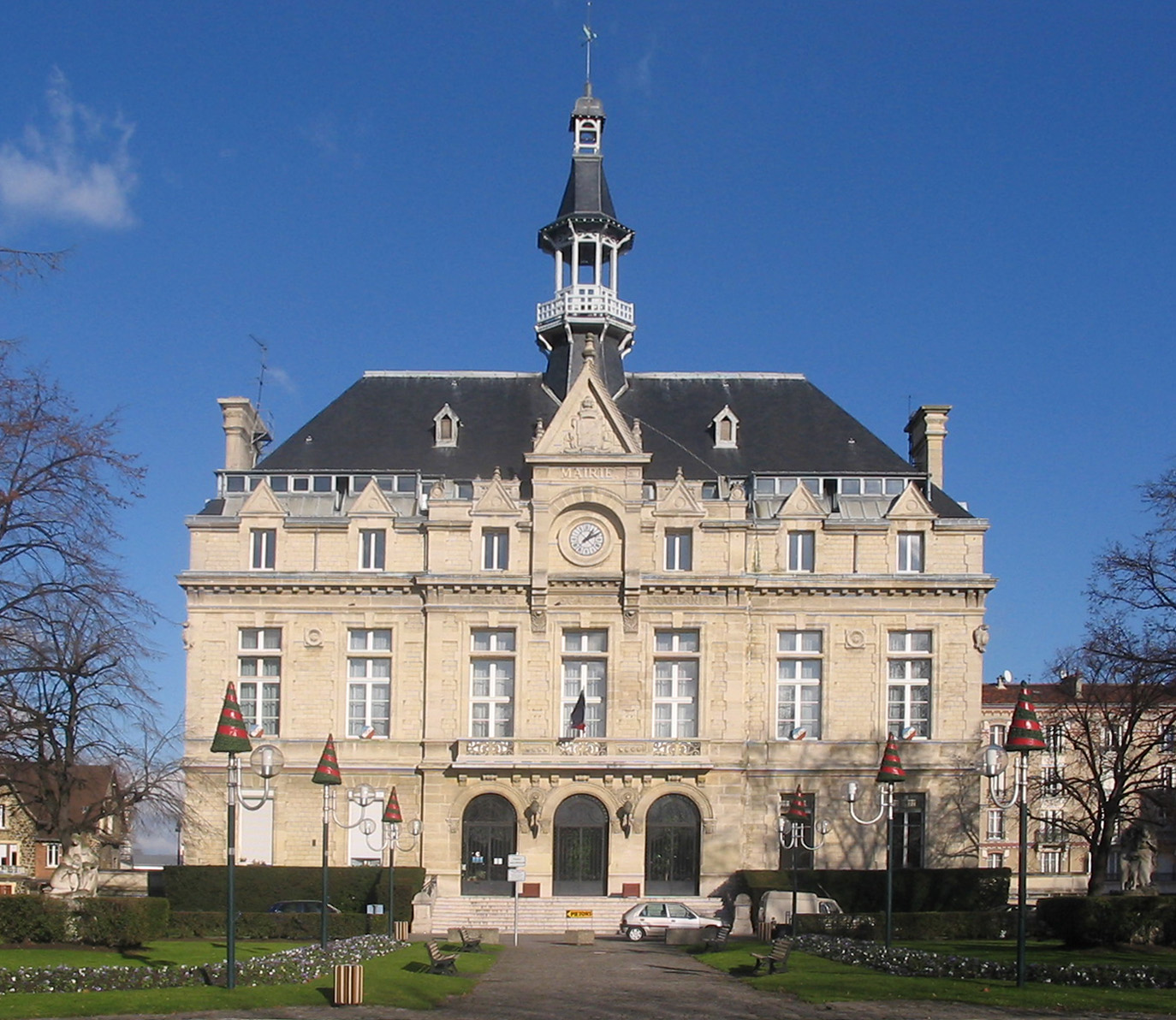
- The main frontage of the Hôtel de Ville in January 2005
- Interactive map of the Hôtel de Ville area

General information
- Type: City hall
- Architectural style: Neoclassical style
- Location: La Courneuve, France
- Coordinates: 48.9267°N 2.3896°E
- Completed: 1921

Height
- Height: 30 metres (98 ft)

Design and construction
- Architect: Pierre Mathieu

The Hôtel de Ville (French pronunciation: [otɛl də vil], City Hall) is a municipal building in La Courneuve, Seine-Saint-Denis, in the northern suburbs of Paris, standing on Place de l'Hôtel de Ville.

== History ==
The first municipal building, known as the Maison Commune, served both as a municipal office and a school but its location has been lost to time. After the French Revolution, the town council moved to a building opposite the Church of Saint-Lucien on Rue de Bondy (now Rue de la Convention), which it rented from Sieur Toffier until 1837, when it purchased the building for FFr 8,000.

In 1898, the council led by the mayor, Philippe Roux, decided to commission a more substantial building. The site they selected was close to La Courneuve–Aubervilliers station, which had recently opened, and it was large enough to allow the creation of a central square for public events. Construction of the new building started in 1907, but progress was delayed because of commercial disputes, and then by lack of resources during the First World War. It was designed by the municipal architect, Pierre Mathieu, in the neoclassical style, built in ashlar stone and was officially opened by the president of France, Alexandre Millerand, on 18 December 1921.

The design involved a symmetrical main frontage of seven bays facing onto Place de l'Hôtel de Ville. The central section of the three bays, which was slightly projected forward, featured a short flight of steps leading up to three round headed openings with moulded surrounds. There were three French doors with moulded surrounds, keystones and a balustraded balcony on the first floor. Above the central bay, there was a clock with an arched surround, which was flanked by pilasters supporting a triangular pediment with a coat of arms in the tympanum. An octagonal lantern, 30 meters (98 ft) high, was installed behind the clock. The other bays were fenestrated by casement windows with voussoirs on the ground floor, by casement windows with moulded surrounds and keystones on the first floor, and by dormer windows at attic level. Internally, the principal rooms were the Salle du Conseil (council chamber), the Salle des Mariages (wedding room), and Salle des Pas Perdus (room of lost steps).

During the Paris insurrection, part the Second World War, the town hall was secured by the French Forces of the Interior on 19 August 1944. This was six days in advance of the official liberation of the town by the French 2nd Armoured Division, commanded by General Philippe Leclerc, on 25 August 1944.

A painting by the artist, Boris Taslitzky, entitled Les Délégués (the delegates), was installed in the room of lost steps in 1948. Also, four monumental paintings by the artist, Jean Amblard, entitled L'Orchestre (the orchestra), la République (the republic), le Bal (the ball), and la Promenade (the promenade) were completed and installed in the wedding hall around the same time. The roof lantern was restored by Charpentiers de Paris at a cost of €670,000 in 2022.
