= Denis Jordan =

Anglo-Australian chemist

Professor Denis Jordan AO FAA FRACI

Angas Professor of Chemistry, University of Adelaide
- In office 1958–1982

Personal details
- Born: Denis Oswald Jordan; 23 September 1914 London, England
- Died: 12 February 1982 (aged 67) St Georges, South Australia

Denis Oswald Jordan (23 September 1914, London – 12 February 1982, St Georges, South Australia) was an Anglo-Australian chemist with a distinguished career as a researcher and lecturer in Chemistry at both University College Nottingham (1940–53) and the University of Adelaide, where he was Angas Professor of Chemistry from 1958 to 1982. Jordan also served as president of Australian Institute of Nuclear Science and Engineering from 1958 to 1962, and Royal Australian Chemical Institute from 1978 to 1979.

Whilst at Nottingham 'Doj' Jordan was a key member of the team whose research made important contributions to the eventual decoding of DNA in 1953. Jordan worked with John Masson Gulland, Michael Creeth and others on a series of experiments in 1947 which firstly created high quality DNA, then measured its viscocity, and finally demonstrated the hydrogen bonds within the molecule. Their discoveries were ultimately acknowledged by James Watson as critical contributions even if he did at first dismiss them incorrectly: "...a rereading of J. M. Gulland's and D. O. Jordan's papers...made me finally realize the strength of their conclusion that a large fraction, if not all, of the bases formed hydrogen bonds to other bases." Gulland and Jordan's work was also acknowledged in the first papers concerning the decoding of DNA by Rosalind Franklin and Raymond Gosling. It has however been argued that the work of the Nottingham team was subsequently overlooked until commemorations were held in 2010 and 2017.

Jordan continued to work at Nottingham University on deoxyribonucleic acid after the untimely death of Gulland in the Goswick rail crash in October 1947, but in 1953 he was appointed to a professorship in Adelaide where he arrived in 1954.

In 1981, the University of Adelaide, named its physical and inorganic Chemistry building after Jordan.

In November 2017 a plaque was unveiled in the Trent Building at University of Nottingham commemorating the 70th anniversary of the "Discovery of Hydrogen Bonds in DNA by JM Creeth, DO Jordan and JM Gulland".

== Publications ==
- The Chemistry of Nucleic Acids (1960)

== Awards ==
Jordan was awarded a number of honours, including:

- 1954 - Fellow of the Royal Australian Chemical Institute (FRACI)
- 1963 - Liversidge Research Lecture, Royal Society of New South Wales
- 1970 - Fellow of the Australian Academy of Science
- 1974 - Medal, Polymer Division, RACI (Now named Batteard-Jordan Australian Polymer Medal)
- 1980 - Officer of the Order of Australia (AO)
- 1981 - Leighton Memorial Medal
