= Mapson =

Mapson is a surname. Notable people with the surname include:

- Jo-Ann Mapson, American author
- Johnny Mapson (1917–1999), British footballer

== See also ==
- Manson
- Masson (surname)
