= Michael Creeth =

English biochemist

James Michael Creeth
- Born: 3 October 1924; Northampton, Northamptonshire, England
- Died: 15 January 2010 (aged 85); Shrewsbury, Shropshire
- Education: University College, Nottingham
- Known for: DNA hydrogen bonds, Mucus
- Scientific career
- Fields: Biochemistry
- Workplaces: Courtauld Institute of Biochemistry; University of Wisconsin, USA; University of Adelaide, Australia; Lister Institute of Preventative Medicine, London; University of Bristol
- Doctoral advisor: Denis Oswald Jordan, John Masson Gulland

James Michael Creeth (3 October 1924 – 15 January 2010) was an English biochemist whose experiments on DNA viscosity confirming the existence of hydrogen bonds between the purine and pyrimidine bases of DNA were crucial to Watson and Crick's discovery of the double helix structure of DNA.

== Early life ==
Creeth was educated at Northampton Town and County Grammar School, and went on to read Chemistry at University College Nottingham, first as a war-time undergraduate (1942–44) and then as a postgraduate PhD student (1944-7) under the supervision of D. O. Jordan and John Masson Gulland.

== Creeth and the decoding of DNA ==
The research conducted by Creeth for his PhD and more especially an associated paper in 1947 was one key element amongst others which paved the way to the decoding of the complexities of DNA in 1953. Put simply, Creeth and his Nottingham colleagues conducted chemical experiments which demonstrated the hydrogen pair bonding in the molecule. In his PhD thesis he additionally postulated and sketched a molecular structure for DNA based on hydrogen bonds linking overlapped shorter chains together to form a longer, almost double, chain. In Creeth’s model the hydrogen bonded bases are on the inside of the molecule, which has a phosphate sugar backbone, but there is no helical structure as the X-Ray data was not yet available to provide the data to imply the double helix formation later discerned by Crick and Watson.

Given it was such a critical discovery, the Nottingham team and Creeth’s role in it have sometimes lacked recognition. In the original version of The Double Helix Watson admitted to initially having dismissed their work incorrectly only to find that "...a rereading of J. M. Gulland's and D. O. Jordan's papers...made me finally realize the strength of their conclusion that a large fraction, if not all, of the bases formed hydrogen bonds to other bases”. Once Watson had recognised the key role of the hydrogen bonds then the correct solution to the decoding of DNA seems to have occurred to him within about a week or ten days. Creeth’s personal achievement in conducting such a crucial experiment at age 23 similarly lacked recognition in his lifetime, although his role was posthumously recognised in the expanded Annotated and Illustrated Double Helix (2012), and also by commemorative events at the University of Nottingham.

There has been some speculation as to whether the Nottingham team could have gone on to make the breakthrough on decoding DNA if events had turned out differently following the high point of their research in 1947. However Creeth left to work in London after completing his PhD, and then Gulland was killed in the Goswick rail crash near Berwick on Tweed on 26 October 1947. Some of the necessary scientific processes and knowledge were not in place in 1947, but Creeth also later said that he had not guessed just how close the Nottingham team was to the DNA discovery.

Creeth might have moved on to Cambridge University in the early 1950s when he applied for a post-doctoral place there. Had he gone there, he would have arrived a little prior to Watson and Crick with a wealth of knowledge in their chosen field. It is a rather ironic reflection on prevailing academic elitism, that at the time Cambridge only recognised a handful of other universities’ doctorates and these did not include Nottingham: so Creeth was only offered the chance to do a second PhD, an offer which he politely declined. Instead he was proud to win a Rockefeller Foundation Fellowship to do postdoctoral work in Wisconsin in the USA.

== Later scientific career and glycoproteins ==
Creeth’s later career as a scientist at institutions on three continents focussed largely on proteins. He was an expert in the use and theory of the analytical ultracentrifuge, in characterising the solution properties of proteins, in particular their size, shape and interactions. He became a leading authority on ‘nature’s natural lubricant - mucus’, which contains the glycoproteins which he studied, and helped to advance knowledge of the role they play in medical conditions such as cystic fibrosis, chronic bronchitis and asthma. He even managed to write a retrospective paper on the development of the analytical centrifuge shortly before his death aged eighty five.
