= Reina Lawrence =

Reina Emily Lawrence (born New York, 1860/1, died Essex, 24 February 1940) was an American British lawyer and politician from Hampstead, who was the first female councillor in London, elected in December 1907, and one of the first women in the United Kingdom to be awarded a law degree.

== Career ==
She was educated at St. John's Wood High School and received a 3rd class LLB from University College London in 1893. She was a partner with Eliza Orme, the first woman in England to receive a law degree (also from UCL), at their law office from the mid-1880s on Chancery Lane.

She was on the executive of the Women's National Liberal Association 1897-1902, a trustee of the Mary Macarthur Home, and a member of the government's Central Committee on Women’s Employment during World War I. Lawrence volunteered for the homeless on the Hampstead Distress Committee from 1905 and promoted reform of the swimming baths.

In the first year that women were no longer prohibited from standing for election in the United Kingdom, following the passing of the Qualification of Women Act, Lawrence stood in a by-election in Belsize ward to Hampstead Borough Council following the resignation of C. S. Preston. The first women borough councillors, seven in England and one in Scotland, had been elected on 1 November. Lawrence was elected on 12 December 1907 with a majority of 319 votes. She gained support from Orme and the Hampstead Women's Local Government Society, stressing that she was not a suffragette. A contemporary newspaper reported she was "strongly recommended by several members of Parliament and local aldermen and councillors". She was on the baths, distress, public health, and works committees. Another woman, Quaker social worker Mary E. Balkhill, was elected unopposed to Kilburn ward in Hampstead the following May. Despite support from the Hampstead Non-Political and Progressive Association, Lawrence lost the subsequent election in October 1909 by six votes.

== Personal life ==
Reina was born in New York to an Anglo-Jewish family. Her father John Moss Lawrence was a merchant and investor, and her mother Emily was from Spanish Town, Jamaica. She was the third of nine siblings. The family moved to London in the 1870s and settled in Belsize Park in the 1880s at 37 Belsize Avenue, where Reina remained living with her parents, close to the family of her law partner Orme. Her younger sister Caroline (born 1864/5) also studied at UCL, reading English and French. Another sister Esther was a kindergarten teacher. Her younger brother Henry Walton Lawrence, known as HW Lawrence, was a business partner of Arthur Henry Bullen.

She was the executor and residuary beneficiary of Orme's will when she died in 1937. They may have had an intimate relationship, referred to as a "Boston marriage". By 1911 she had moved to Messing, Essex and she died in Essex in 1940.

== Legacy ==
Two years after her death in 1940, it was noted that her "balanced counsel during her long life of useful work steered many Hampstead charitable bodies." Lawrence's election as a councillor was commemorated in 2008 by an Early Day Motion in the House of Commons, sponsored by Lynne Featherstone and signed by 33 MPs. Lawrence was featured in an exhibition at Holborn library in Camden from December 2007 to January 2008, alongside Mary Wollstonecraft and Elizabeth Garrett Anderson. Lawrence's election was included in a 2009 government "Women in power" factsheet that left out the election of Margaret Thatcher as the first woman Prime Minister. In December 2018, the London Assembly included Lawrence among 100 women they proposed to have an English Heritage blue plaque, in honour of 100 years since some women were given the vote.
