= La Courneuve =

- Commune
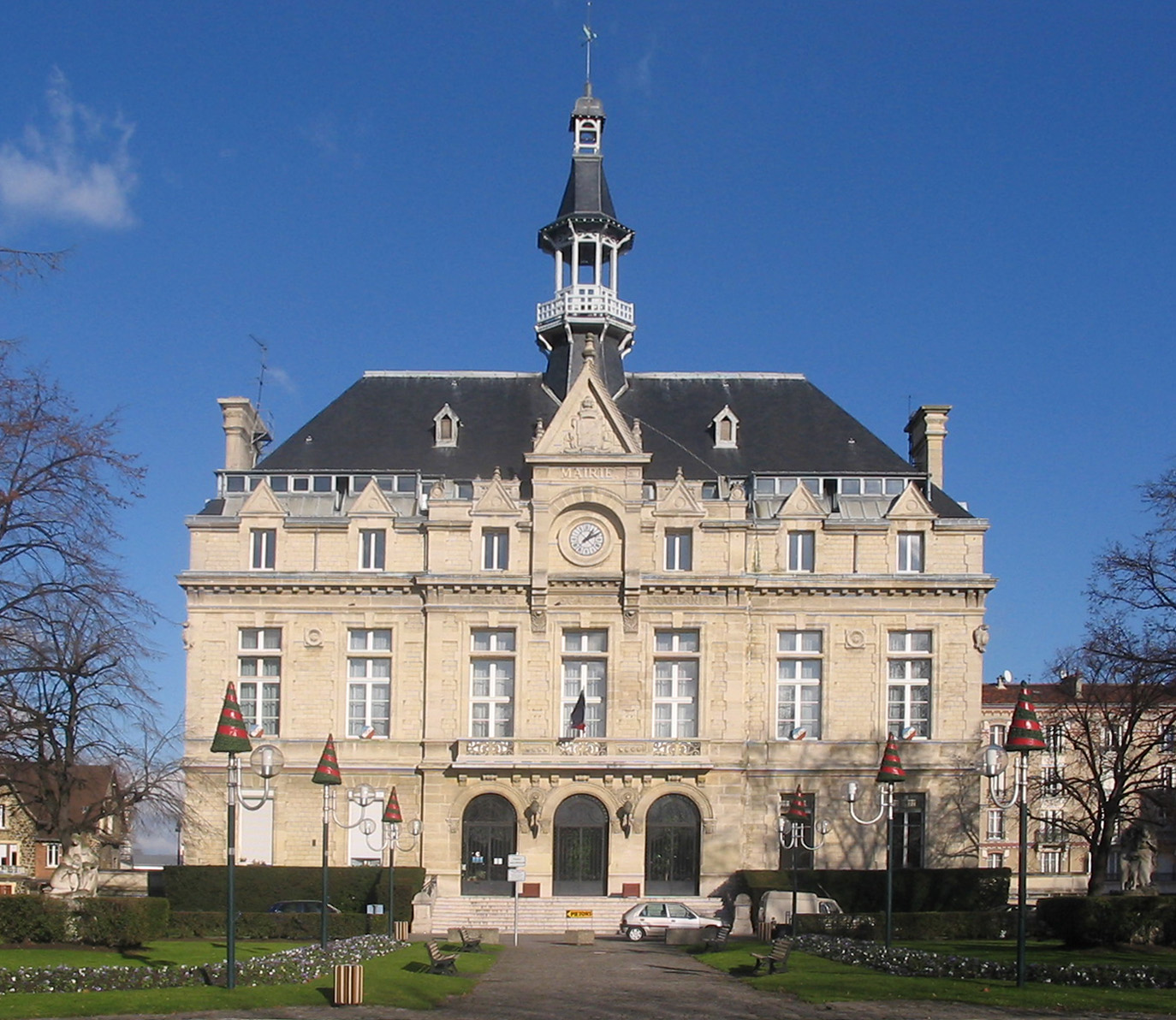
- The Hôtel de Ville

- Coat of arms

- Location (in red) within Paris inner suburbs
- Location of La Courneuve
- Location within France Location within Île-de-France (region)
- Coordinates: 48°55′56″N 2°23′48″E
- Country: France
- Region: Île-de-France
- Department: Seine-Saint-Denis
- Arrondissement: Saint-Denis
- Canton: La Courneuve
- Intercommunality: Grand Paris

Government
  - Mayor (2026–32): Aly Diouara (LFI)
- Area^{1}: 7.52 km^{2} (2.90 sq mi)
- Elevation: 40 m (130 ft)
- Highest elevation: 60 m (200 ft)
- Lowest elevation: 29 m (95 ft)
- Population (2023): 47,167
  - Density: 6,270/km^{2} (16,200/sq mi)
- Time zone: UTC+01:00 (CET)
  - Summer (DST): UTC+02:00 (CEST)
- INSEE/Postal code: 93027 /93120
- ^{1} French Land Register data, which excludes lakes, ponds, glaciers > 1 km^{2} (0.386 sq mi or 247 acres) and river estuaries.

La Courneuve (French pronunciation: [la kuʁnœv]) is a commune in Seine-Saint-Denis, France. It is located 8.3 km (5.2 mi) from the center of Paris.

== History ==
The name La Courneuve derives from the Latin curtis nova meaning the 'new court/estate'.

Inhabited since pre-Roman times, the area is thought to have been a small village up through the Middle Ages. With its proximity to Paris, it soon became a fashionable country destination, with a number of gentry residing there. It had two notable châteaux - Sainte-Foi and Poitronville. Towards the end of Napoleon's reign, the entire area experienced large population growth. This along with improved methods of farming eventually transformed the area into the major legume producer for the Paris regional.

In 1863, the first major industrial enterprise was introduced and the area soon became a strange mix of factories and farmlands. Industrial estates were juxtaposed with bean plantations and that would continue until after World War II.

The Hôtel de Ville was completed in 1921.

During the 1960s, as Paris could no longer meet the demands of a further exploding population, La Courneuve, like many other suburbs of Paris, was designated as one of the "zones à urbaniser en priorité" (areas to be urbanized quickly) and was built up at a very rapid pace, with the construction of large council estates and tower blocks and other HLM developments. Between 1962 and 1968 the population nearly doubled.

=== Heraldry ===
arms of La Courneuve	The arms of La Courneuve are blazoned : Azure, a wall embattled argent masoned sable, open to the field contain a millwheel Or above waves argent
motto: droiture et tendresse ("righteousness and tenderness")

== Urbanism ==
=== Typology ===
Pantin is an urban commune, as it is one of the dense or intermediate density communes, as defined by the Insee communal density grid. (Note: According to the zoning of rural and urban municipalities published in November 2020, in application of the new definition of rurality validated on November 14, 2020 by the Interministerial Committee for Rural Areas.) It belongs to the urban unit of Paris, an inter-departmental conurbation comprising 407 communes and 10,785,092 inhabitants in 2017, of which it is a suburban commune.

The commune is also part of the functional area of Paris (Note: In October 2020, the concept of functional area replaced that of urban area in order to enable consistent comparisons with other European Union countries) where it is located in the main population and employment centre of the functional area. This area comprises 1,929 communes.

== Demographics ==
Non-French nationals rose from 11% in La Courneuve in 1968, to 25% in 1990.

Historical population

Year	Pop.	±% p.a.
1793	555	—
1821	502	−0.36%
1846	572	+0.52%
1861	791	+2.18%
1866	1,006	+4.93%
1872	859	−2.60%
1876	926	+1.90%
1881	1,124	+3.95%
1886	1,251	+2.16%
1891	1,542	+4.27%
1896	1,789	+3.02%
1901	2,200	+4.22%
1906	2,742	+4.50%
1911	3,341	+4.03%
1921	5,646	+5.39%

Year	Pop.	±% p.a.
1926	10,297	+12.77%
1931	15,780	+8.91%
1936	17,390	+1.96%
1946	16,609	−0.46%
1954	18,349	+1.25%
1962	25,792	+4.35%
1968	43,318	+9.03%
1975	37,958	−1.87%
1982	33,537	−1.75%
1990	34,139	+0.22%
1999	35,310	+0.38%
2007	37,228	+0.66%
2012	39,859	+1.38%
2017	43,054	+1.55%
2023	47,167	+1.53%

Source: EHESS and INSEE (1968-2023)

=== Immigration ===
Place of birth of residents of La Courneuve in 1999
Born in metropolitan France	Born outside metropolitan France			
62.6%	37.4%			
62.6%	Born in overseas France	Born in foreign countries with French citizenship at birth^{1}	EU-15 immigrants^{2}	Non-EU-15 immigrants
62.6%	3.1%	3.5%	4.1%	26.7%
^{1} This group is made up largely of former French settlers, such as pieds-noirs in Northwest Africa, followed by former colonial citizens who had French citizenship at birth (such as was often the case for the native elite in French colonies), as well as to a lesser extent foreign-born children of French expatriates. A foreign country is understood as a country not part of France in 1999, so a person born for example in 1950 in Algeria, when Algeria was an integral part of France, is nonetheless listed as a person born in a foreign country in French statistics.^{2} An immigrant is a person born in a foreign country not having French citizenship at birth. An immigrant may have acquired French citizenship since moving to France, but is still considered an immigrant in French statistics. On the other hand, persons born in France with foreign citizenship (the children of immigrants) are not listed as immigrants.

== Education ==
Preschools and primary schools

- Anatole-France
- Charlie-Chaplin
- Irène-Joliot-Curie
- Louise-Michel
- Paul-Doumer
- Paul-Langevin / Henri-Wallon
- Robespierre / Jules-Vallès
- Saint-Exupéry
- Raymond-Poincaré
- Rosenberg
- Joséphine-Baker
- Angela Davis

High schools/junior high schools:

- Collège Raymond-Poincaré
- Collège Jean-Vilar
- Collège Georges-Politzer

Sixth-form colleges/senior high schools:

- Lycée Jacques-Brel
- Lycée d'enseignement professionnel Denis-Papin
- Lycée Arthur-Rimbaud

== Transport ==
La Courneuve is served by La Courneuve – 8 Mai 1945 station on Paris Métro Line 7 and by La Courneuve–Aubervilliers station on Paris RER B.

== Notable people ==
- Haris Belkebla, Algerian footballer
- Suzanne Masson, French resistance fighter, (1901-1943)
- Dinos (rapper), French Rapper

== See also ==
- Communes of the Seine-Saint-Denis department
- Stade de Marville
- Centre des archives diplomatiques de La Courneuve
