= Elsie Rosaline Masson =

Australian photographer, writer and traveller (1890–1935)

- Born: 1891
- Died: 1935 (aged 43–44)
- Spouse: Bronislaw Malinowski (m. 1919; death 1935)
- Relatives: David Orme Masson (father); John Struthers (grandfather); Irvine Masson (brother); Marnie Bassett (sister)

Elsie Rosaline Masson (1891–1935) was an Australian photographer, writer and traveller.

Best known as the wife of Polish-British anthropologist Bronisław Malinowski. She published An Untamed Territory: The Northern Territory of Australia in 1915.

== Biography ==
Masson was born in Melbourne and was the daughter of David Orme Masson and his wife Mary Struthers, daughter of John Struthers, who had arrived in Australia from Scotland in 1886. Sister of Irvine Masson and Marnie Bassett.

A close family friend of the family was Baldwin Spencer who likely influenced Masson to later travel to the Northern Territory. She attended school at Melbourne Church of England Girls' Grammar School and received first class honours in French and German and received a scholarship to study Italian at university.

Masson first moved to the Northern Territory in 1913 to work as a governess to the children of John A. Gilruth, who was the Administrator, she also acted as a companion to his wife and she left in 1914. This coincided with Baldwin Spencer's time there as the Special Commissioner and Chief Protector of Aborigines and she travelled alongside him.

It was while in Darwin, and the travel she did from there, that she began publishing articles in numerous Australian newspapers about her life there which became the book, An Untamed Territory: The Northern Territory of Australia (1915). This book is a lively account which covers material from Darwin to Pine Creek. During her time in the Northern Territory she also took many photographs which are now held by the Pitt Rivers Museum.

In Melbourne, and with the outbreak of World War I, Masson trained as a nurse and then, also in 1914, met and, in 1919, married Bronisław Malinowski; together they settled in England and Italy.

She then had three daughters, Józefa (b. 1920), Wanda (b. 1922) and Helena (1925–2018). Their daughter Helena Malinowska Wayne would conduct research and publish several works about the life her parents, including a book The story of a marriage: the letters of Bronislaw Malinowski and Elsie Masson (1995).

She died in 1935 while in Austria.
