= Goswick =

Hamlet in Northumberland, England

Coordinates: 55.7°N 1.907°W

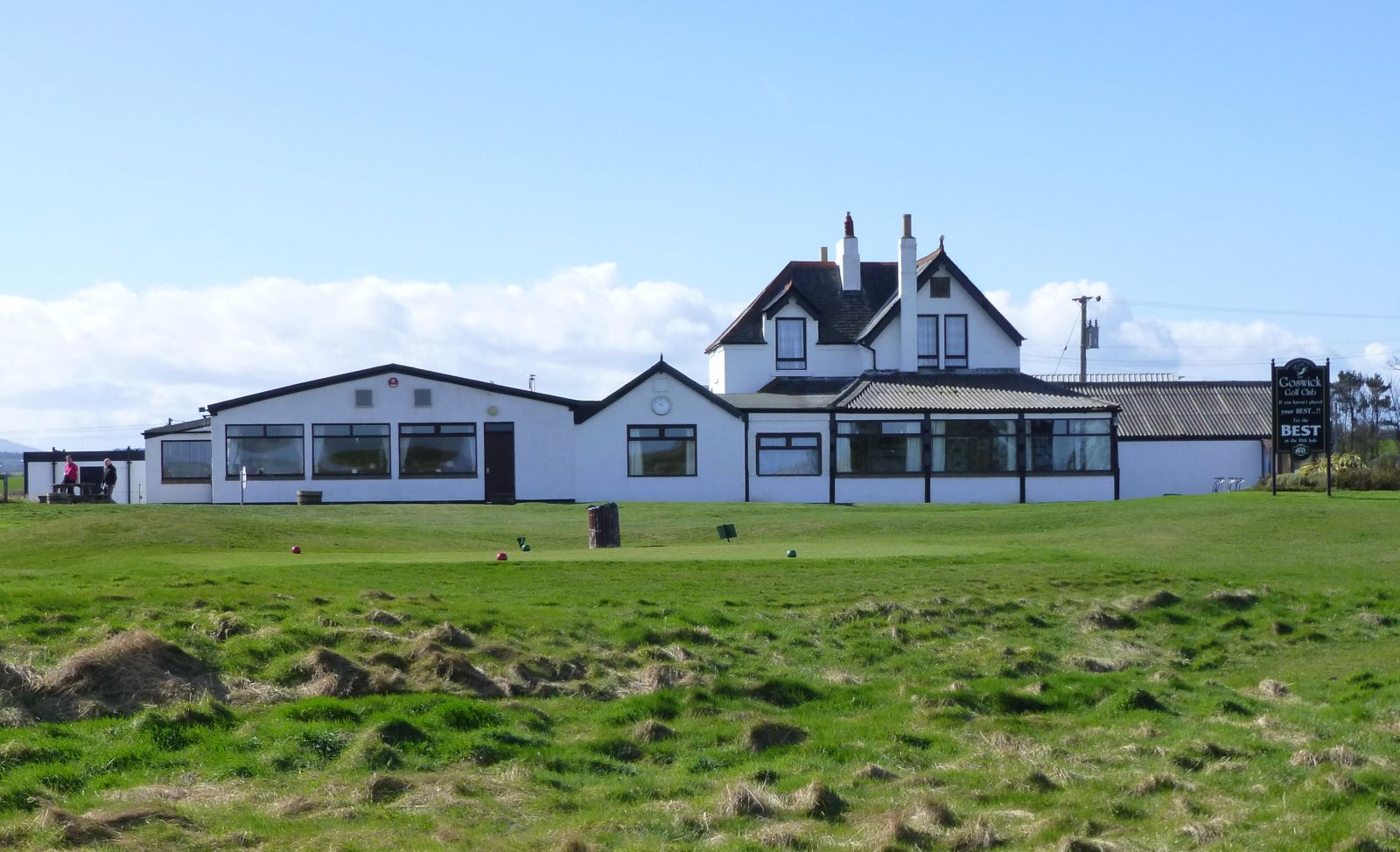
- Goswick Golf Club

- Location within Northumberland
- OS grid reference: NU035465
- District: Northumberland
- Shire county: Northumberland
- Region: North East
- Country: England
- Sovereign state: United Kingdom
- Post town: BERWICK-UPON-TWEED
- Postcode district: TD15
- Dialling code: 01289
- Police: Northumbria
- Fire: Northumberland
- Ambulance: North East
- UK Parliament: North Northumberland

Goswick (/ˈɡɒsɪk/) is a hamlet in Northumberland, England, situated approximately south-east of Berwick-upon-Tweed, England, between the A1 and the North Sea coast.

== History ==
=== Goswick station ===
Goswick station was opened in November 1870 when it was known as Windmill Hill Station, but it was renamed Goswick station on 1 January 1898. It was part of the East Coast Main Line (ECML) which ran from London to Edinburgh.

In 1907 Goswick was the site of an Express Goods train derailment.

From 5 May 1941 until 7 October 1946 the station was closed to passengers as part of the World War II economy measures.

On 26 October 1947 it was the site of the Goswick rail crash in which 28 people were killed and 65 injured when an Edinburgh to London express was derailed.

On 28 October 1953 a 'Glasgow to Colchester' train was derailed and one person was injured.

On 15 September 1958 the station was closed to passengers, and on 10 August 1964 it was closed for Goods trains. Finally the signal box was closed on 24 March 1982.

== Governance ==
Goswick is in the parliamentary constituency of Berwick-upon-Tweed.

== Geography ==
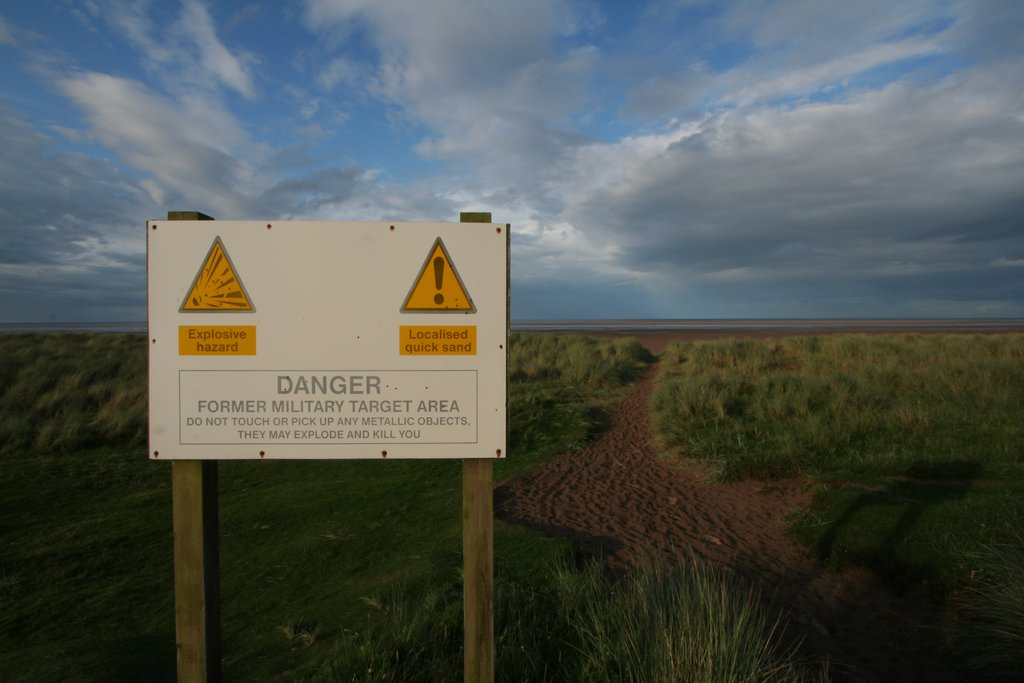
Warning sign, Goswick Sands

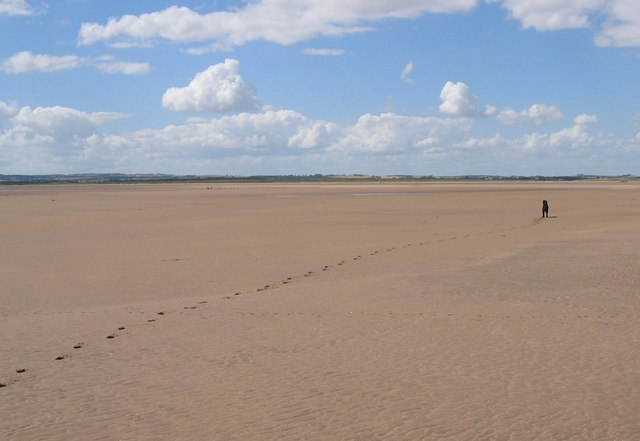
View from Goswick Sands to Goswick

Goswick is approximately 5 miles south of Berwick-upon-Tweed and adjacent to Goswick Sands which connect with Lindisfarne (Holy Island). The island is approximately 10 miles by road but only 2 miles walk along the footpath, across the Goswick sands and along the Holy Island causeway.

The Goswick Links golf club, the Beachcomber campsite and residents of the 12 houses enjoy the North Sea beaches and views across the sands to Lindisfarne (Holy Island) and Lindisfarne Castle.
