= Flora Masson =

Scottish nurse, suffragist, writer, and editor (1856–1937)

- Born: 1856; Edinburgh
- Died: 1937 (aged 80–81); Edinburgh
- Parents: David Masson (father); Emily Rosaline Orme (mother)
- Relatives: Rosaline Masson (sister) David Orme Masson (brother); Eliza Orme (aunt) Emily Augusta Patmore (great aunt)

Flora Masson RRC (1856 – 1937) was a Scottish nurse, suffragist, writer and editor.

== Early life ==
Flora Masson was born in Edinburgh. She was first of three daughters of professor David Masson and suffrage campaigner Emily Rosaline Orme. Her father was chair of the English department at the University of Edinburgh. Her younger brother was a scientist, David Orme Masson, and her younger sisters were Helen and suffragist and writer, Rosaline Masson. Their aunt, Eliza Orme, was the first woman to earn a law degree in England.

Because of her parents' social connections, Masson met Elizabeth Barrett Browning, Thomas Carlyle, Coventry Patmore and James Barrie in her youth, and heard Charles Dickens read from Oliver Twist, among other acquaintances with notables of the nineteenth century.

Flora Masson trained as a nurse at St. Thomas's Hospital, London.

== Career ==
=== Nursing ===
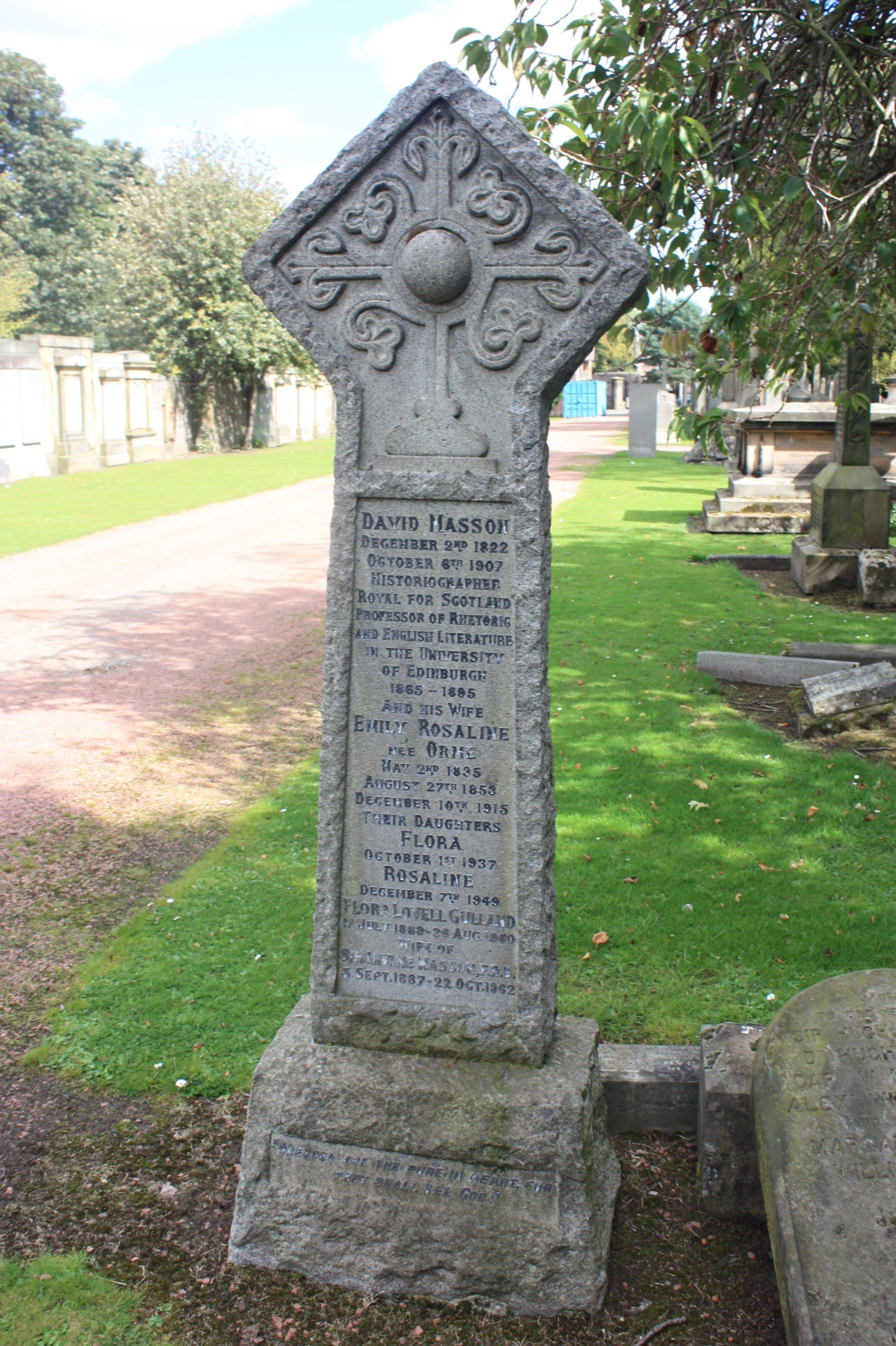
Masson family grave, Grange Cemetery

Masson worked at the Radcliffe Hospital, Oxford and the Eastern Fever Hospital, Homerton (now Homerton University Hospital) as a matron. Masson was matron of the Red Cross hospital near Rosewell during World War I. Masson was awarded the Royal Red Cross of the 1st class "in recognition of valuable services under 'The British Red Cross Society', or 'Order of St. John of Jerusalem in England', rendered in connection with the war". Masson was a close friend and professional colleague of Florence Nightingale, who supported Masson's promotion to Matron and in disputes with hospital administration and medical leaders around competency of staff; Nightingale arranged for practical support and influenced decisions made.

=== Suffrage ===
Masson was active in the women's suffrage movement with her mother and sister, a policy that her father also supported, speaking out when many men remained sceptical. Masson wrote about women's rights to vote in 'The Parliamentary Franchise for Women' published in the Ladies Edinburgh Journal in 1876. Masson joined the Ladies' Edinburgh Debating Society (LEDS) in 1881, which hosted discussions and lectures on various feminist topics, including suffrage, marriage, and religion.

=== Writing ===
Masson edited two of her father's books, Memories of London in the 'Forties (1908) and Memories of Two Cities (1911). Masson also contributed to a book by her sister, I Can Remember Robert Louis Stevenson (1923). Books written by Flora Masson included the following titles:

- Florence Nightingale, O.M. By one who knew her (1910)
- The Brontes (1912)
- Charles Lamb (1913)
- Robert Boyle, a biography (1914)
- Victorians All (1931)
- The Heart Is Highland (1932)

Her Victorians All, about the notable people Masson met in her youth, was described as "a pleasant, rather sad little book" in The Guardian; "this is not so much a book of good stories as about real happenings," the review concluded.

== Personal life ==
Masson lived with her sister Rosaline. She died on 1 October 1937, in Edinburgh. She is buried in Grange Cemetery, Edinburgh, with her parents.
