= Suzanne Masson =

French resistance fighter

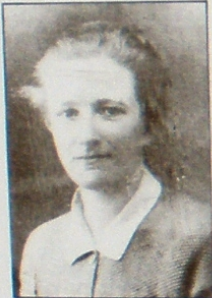
- Born: 10 July 1901; Doullens, France
- Died: 1 November 1943 (aged 42); Hamburg, Germany
- Cause of death: Execution
- Occupation: Resistance fighter
- Honours: French Order of Merit and Knight of the French Legion of Honor

Suzanne Masson (10 July 1901 – 1 November 1943) was a union activist and communist, who was executed for her work in the French Resistance during World War II.

== Life ==
Suzanne Masson was born in Doullens, France. She was hired as a designer at the Rateau factory (now Alstom) in La Courneuve, a northern suburb of Paris, where from the mid-1920s, she was an industrial design technician, the only woman at this level of qualification at the factory. In 1926 she became a member of a local labor group, abbreviated CGT. In February 1934 she joined the French communist party. In 1938 she was released from the turbine factory because of her involvement in strikes there with the federation of the French Communist Party of the Seine. She took part in solidarity actions with republican Spain fighters and their anti-fascism efforts. In 1939, after the French Communist Party was banned, she continued to work for it illegally.

After German troops occupied Paris on 14 June, Masson distributed leaflets and organized peoples' committees. In La Courneuve, she was instrumental in setting up the local resistance group and with her CGT comrades who had gone underground. On 5 February 1942, she was discovered and fled to her house at 95, boulevard Macdonald in Paris where she was arrested by the police of the French Vichy government who were cooperating with German occupiers.

First interned in the women's prison at Petite-Roquette ND then at the "Health" prison called La Santé in France, she was finally delivered to the Gestapo who deported her to Germany. On 18 May 1942, she was sent to Karlsruhe and later transferred to Anrath.

In June 1943 at Lauerhof prison, she was tried for possession of weapons, her calls for resistance against the German occupiers, and her clandestine connections with the French Communist Party. As a result, she was sentenced to death. She was given the opportunity to plea for mercy but she refused to do so, declaring in court that it was her duty as a French patriot and communist to fight for humanity.

On 1 November 1943, she was guillotined in the Hamburg prison courtyard.

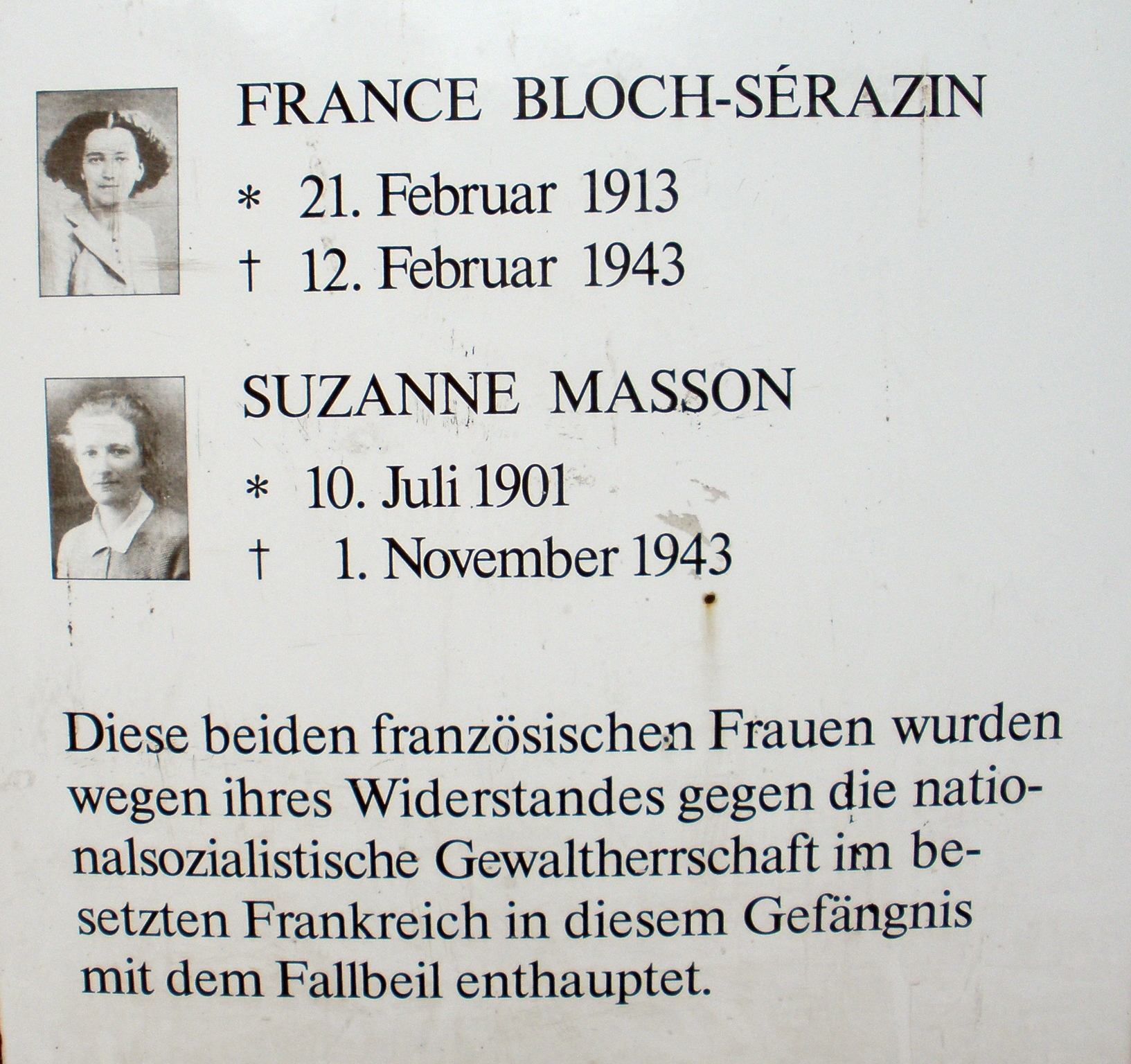
Commemorative plaque on the back of the Holstenglacis remand center in Hamburg.

== Honors ==
In 1946, Masson was posthumously given the French Order of Merit and appointed Knight of the French Legion of Honor by Ambroise Croizat, Minister of Labor and Social Security.

In October 1950, a Paris trade union educational institution, the Suzanne Masson Center (in the 12th arrondissement of Paris), was named after her. Each year, the Center commemorates 8 May 1945, the "date of the victory of freedom against barbarism" and to "pay tribute to those who fought Nazism at the risk of their lives, such as Suzanne Masson."

In 2005, a street (the rue de la Gare), near the La Courneuve–Aubervilliers railway station, was renamed rue Suzanne-Masson.

On the site of the Hamburg prison, a plaque on the back wall of the detention center commemorates the two fighters who were killed there. A translation of the inscription reads:

France Bloch-Sérazin, 21 February 1913 - 12 February 1943

Suzanne Masson, 10 July 1901 - 1 November 1943

These two French women were beheaded with a guillotine in this prison because of their resistance to National Socialist tyranny in occupied France.

A street in Paris is named for Masson, about two kilometres northeast of the Gare De l'Est railway station.

In 2014, a path was named for Masson in the 19th arrondissement of Paris.

== Other plaques ==
In 1938, the Central Execution Center for Northern Germany was set up in the Hamburg remand prison. As of 1988, there were three commemorative plaques at the site.

- The first was a general memorial for the approximately 500 people executed there during the Nazi era.
- The second commemorates two resistance fighters of the Resistance, France Bloch-Sérazin and Suzanne Masson.
- The third plaque names four Lübeck clergymen executed there in 1943 and who are referred to as Lübeck martyrs.
