= Eliza Orme =

English lawyer, editor

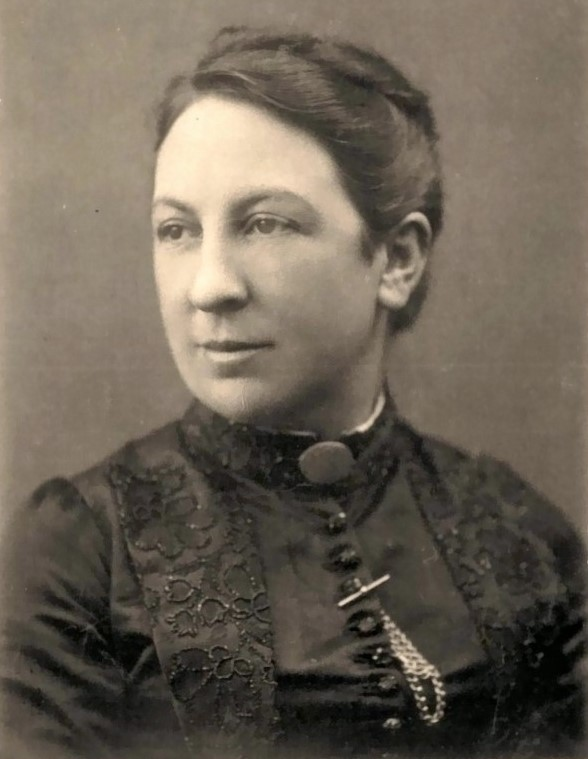
- Born: 25 December 1848; London, England
- Died: 22 June 1937 (aged 88); Streatham, London, England
- Occupation: Lawyer

Eliza Orme (25 December 1848 – 22 June 1937) was the first woman to earn a law degree in England, from University College London in 1888.

== Early life ==
Orme was born near Regent's Park in London, into a well-connected middle-class family. She was the seventh of eight children of Charles Orme (c.1806–1893) and Eliza (née Andrews) (1816–1892), daughter of Reverend Edward Andrews. Charles Orme was a distiller and Eliza Orme hosted a salon that was frequented by members of the Pre-Raphaelite brotherhood. Orme was the niece of Emily Augusta Patmore (née Andrews) (1824–1862) who published under the name Mrs. Motherly and was the first wife and lifelong influence of poet and essayist Coventry Patmore. Orme's sister Emily Rosaline Orme would go on to become a noted campaigner for women's suffrage in Scotland.

Her parents often hosted academics and artists such as Thomas Carlyle and John Stuart Mill, and were supportive of women's education. Orme attended the Bedford College for Women and, in 1869, was one of nine women to write the University of London’s first General Examination for Women. After University College London allowed both men and women to attend lectures, she became a student there in 1872. Her teachers included John Elliot Cairnes (1823–1875), W. Leonard Courtney (1850–1928), and W. A. Hunter (1844–1898). She earned awards and scholarships in Political Economy, Jurisprudence, and Roman Law.

In 1874, she wrote two articles for The Examiner on the subject of degrees for women at the University of London, arguing in favour of women's education. Four years later, the university reversed its policy and permitted women to receive degrees and in 1878, she passed the first two exams for the Bachelor of Laws with honours. She received her LLB degree from the University of London in 1888.

== Career ==
Although Orme did not receive her degree until 1888, she began working towards legal practice in 1872 with support from Helen Taylor, who paid her fee to become a pupil at Lincoln's Inn where she was a pupil in the chambers of a barrister, John Savill Vaizey, in 1873.

However, her aspiration to be recognised as a "conveyancer under the bar" was blocked. Until the passing of the Sex Disqualification (Removal) Act 1919, women were not permitted to qualify as a barrister or a solicitor in England. Instead, she established an office on Chancery Lane in 1875, initially with Mary Richardson, and from the mid-1880s with Reina Emily Lawrence, continuing to work on legal matters until about 1904.

Their office prepared the paperwork for wills, mortgages and property conveyancing. Patent agency and probate settlements could be undertaken by non-solicitors as they were unregulated. In 1903 Orme was interviewed by the Law Journal, and recounted ‘I “devilled” for about a dozen conveyancing counsel who kept me busily employed on drafts they wanted done in a hurry, and for twenty-five years I found it both an interesting and profitable employment’.

In 1893, Orme was invited to send papers to the Congress on Jurisprudence and Law Reform as part of the World's Columbian Exposition in Chicago, which was the first time women were invited to join a formal legal congress. Her paper, The Legal Status of Women in England, was read on her behalf by Mary A. Ahrens.

== Politics ==
Orme was influenced by J. S. Mill, W. A. Hunter, John Elliott Cairnes and Leonard Courtney, all supporters of ''laissez-faire'' and Benthamite reform. She too became active in Liberal Party politics and as a feminist. She was involved with the National Society for Women's Suffrage and the Society for Promoting the Employment of Women, and other feminist organizations.

She was a founding member of the Women's Liberal Federation in 1887 and edited the Women's Gazette and Weekly News between 1889 and 1891. She left in 1892 when she was invited to serve as Senior Lady Assistant Commissioner on the Royal Commission on Labour. She wrote a biography of the WLF founder, Lady Fry of Darlington (1898).

Orme was well connected in the political sphere. She met the American suffragist Susan B. Anthony in 1883 and the late nineteenth century English novelist George Gissing in November 1894, and American suffragist Susan B. Anthony in 1883. She was considered by Beatrice and Sidney Webb to be as politically important as Millicent Garrett Fawcett, and may have inspired the character of Vivie Warren in George Bernard Shaw's Mrs Warren's Profession.

In 1901, she wrote the entries for the Dictionary of National Biography on W. A. Hunter, Samuel Plimsoll and Thomas Bayley Potter.

== Personal life ==
She lived for most of her life with her parents in London until their deaths in the 1890s, and then with her sister Beatrice at Tulse Hill. She died in Streatham from heart failure. Her colleague Reina Lawrence was the executor and residuary beneficiary of Orme's will when she died in 1937. They may have had an intimate relationship, referred to as a “Boston marriage”.

Orme was known to correspond with other female lawyers in the United States, as part of the Equity Club.

== See also ==
- Cornelia Sorabji, first woman to take the Bachelor of Civil Laws exam at Oxford, in 1892
- Gwyneth Bebb, died in 1921 before qualifying as a barrister
- Ivy Williams, first woman called to the English bar in 1922
