= Books on British railway accidents =

There are a number of books on British railway accidents which provide aid in the systematic study of the causes and effects of accidents, and their prevention. There are common themes in many accidents (see Classification). Key books are listed here to avoid repeating them for each individual accident.

The doyen is L. T. C. Rolt's Red for Danger, first published in 1956, which takes a wide-ranging overview of over 100 accidents. Most other books concentrate on a smaller number of specific accidents, described in more detail. O.S. Nock's "Historic Railway Disasters" combines both approaches, with individual chapters on especially significant accidents such as Armagh and Quintinshill. For accidents in the last 30 years and modern operating practice, Stanley Hall's four books are particularly good. Apart from Schneider and Mase (1968/1970) and Faith (2001), all the books below are confined to British accidents.

The list below does not include books on individual accidents; for these, see Tay Bridge, Quintinshill, Harrow, Hixon, Moorgate and Lockington.

An extremely valuable source now on the Internet is the Railways Archive compilation of official Railway Inspectorate Accident Reports - see "External Links" below.

== Key books ==
- Faith, Nicholas (2001). Derail: Why Trains Crash (2nd ed.). Channel 4 Books. ISBN 0-7522-1987-1. First published 1998 to accompany the Channel 4 series. An overall survey like Rolt's, but covering worldwide accidents.
- Hall, Stanley (1987). Danger Signals: an investigation into modern railway accidents. Ian Allan. ISBN 0-7110-1704-2. A broad survey, concentrating especially on accidents in the 20 years up to 1986, especially those caused by drivers' and signalmen's errors.
- Hall, Stanley (1991). Danger on the Line. Ian Allan. ISBN 0-7110-1872-3. Covers Clapham Junction, Purley, Glasgow Bellgrove and a wide range of other accidents, e.g. track problems, fires, staff fatalities.
- Hall, Stanley (1999). Hidden Dangers. Ian Allan. ISBN 0-7137-1973-7. Covers the period 1989-97 including Cowden, Newton and Southall.
- Hall, Stanley (2003). Beyond Hidden Dangers: Railway Safety into the 21st Century. Ian Allan. ISBN 0-7110-2915-6.. Includes Ladbroke Grove, Hatfield, Potters Bar, Great Heck (Selby).
- Hamilton., J.A.B. (1967). British Railway Accidents of the 20th Century (reprinted 1987 as Disaster down the Line). George Allen and Unwin / Javelin Books. ISBN 0-7137-1973-7. Covers 27 accidents between 1905 and 1962. Particularly good on the human factor and psychological reasons behind accidents.
- Nock, O. S. (1987). Historic Railway Disasters (4th ed.). Shepperton: Ian Allan. ISBN 0099077205. First published 1966, another well-written classic.
- Rolt, L.T.C. (1956). Red for Danger. Bodley Head / David and Charles / Pan Books. An excellent overview of accidents up to 1957, in fine writing style. An early reviewer wrote, "At the risk of being thought callous, one must praise Mr Rolt for making death and disaster most attractive reading". Several revised and updated editions published (1960, 1966, 1976, 1982). 1970s and 1980s editions have material added by G.M. Kichenside, which was omitted from later reprints.
- Schneider, Ascanio; Armand Mase (1968). Katastrophen auf Schienen. (In German). Orell Fussli Verlag.
- Schneider, Ascanio; Armand Mase (1970). Railway Accidents of (Great Britain and) Europe. Translated from German (book above) by E.L. Dellow. David and Charles. ISBN 0-7153-4791-8. Includes classification and numerous European accidents.
- Vaughan, Adrian (1989). Obstruction Danger. Guild Publishing. ISBN 1-85260-055-1. Written by a former signalman, with an interesting selection including some less well-known mishaps.
- British Railway Disasters. Ian Allan. 1996. ISBN 0-7110-2470-7. covers 47 accidents between 1876 and 1991 with many photographs.
- Vaughan, Adrian (2000). Tracks to Disaster. Ian Allan. ISBN 0-7110-2731-5. 19 modern accidents in the period 1975-97. Like his previous book, contains some trenchant comments on railway management.
