= Goswick rail crash =

1947 railway accident in Northumberland, England

Details
- Date: 26 October 1947; 12:47
- Location: Goswick, Northumberland
- Coordinates: 55.705°N 1.927°W
- Country: England
- Line: East Coast Main Line
- Operator: London and North Eastern Railway
- Incident type: Derailment caused by excessive speed
- Cause: Driver's error

Statistics
- Trains: 1
- Passengers: 420
- Deaths: 28
- Injured: 65

The Goswick rail crash occurred on 26 October 1947 near the village of Goswick, Northumberland, England. The Flying Scotsman express from Edinburgh Waverley to London King's Cross failed to slow down for a diversion and derailed. Twenty-eight people were killed, including the talented Scottish biochemist, John Masson Gulland. It was the last major accident to occur on British railways before their nationalisation on 1 January 1948.

== Overview ==
The train was scheduled to divert from the fast line to a goods loop at Goswick, Northumberland, between Berwick-upon-Tweed and Morpeth, because of engineering work. This required a significant reduction in speed, but the driver failed to react to a cautionary signal approaching the diversion and the train entered a 15 miles per hour (24 km/h) turnout at approximately 60 miles per hour (97 km/h). The engine, A3 Class No. 66 "Merry Hampton", and most of the train derailed and overturned, though the dining car kept going down the line for 200 yards (180 m).

The driver, fireman and guard had all failed to read or react to the notice of the diversion posted at Haymarket depot. The driver, who was held principally at fault, had also allowed an unauthorised passenger on to the footplate who may have distracted his attention. He claimed to have missed the distant signal due to smoke from the engine obscuring his view. The home signal had been cleared to allow the train to draw up slowly to the points, but the signalman was exonerated because he could not judge the speed of the train until it was too late.

A similar accident had occurred two years earlier at Bourne End, Hertfordshire, killing 43 people.

== Similar accidents ==
- (United Kingdom) Bourne End rail crash - overspeed through turnout
- Jokela rail crash - Finland
- (United Kingdom) Milton rail crash - England

== See also ==
- Lists of rail accidents
- List of rail accidents in the United Kingdom
- Books on British railway accidents
