= Rosaline Masson =

Scottish author

- Born: 6 May 1867; Edinburgh, Scotland, UK
- Died: 7 December 1949 (aged 82); Edinburgh, Scotland, UK
- Occupations: Writer; novelist; historian; biographer
- Writing career
- Genres: Non-fiction, history, biography, novels

Rosaline Masson (1867–1949) was a Scottish author and a prolific writer of novels, biographies, histories and other works.

== Life ==
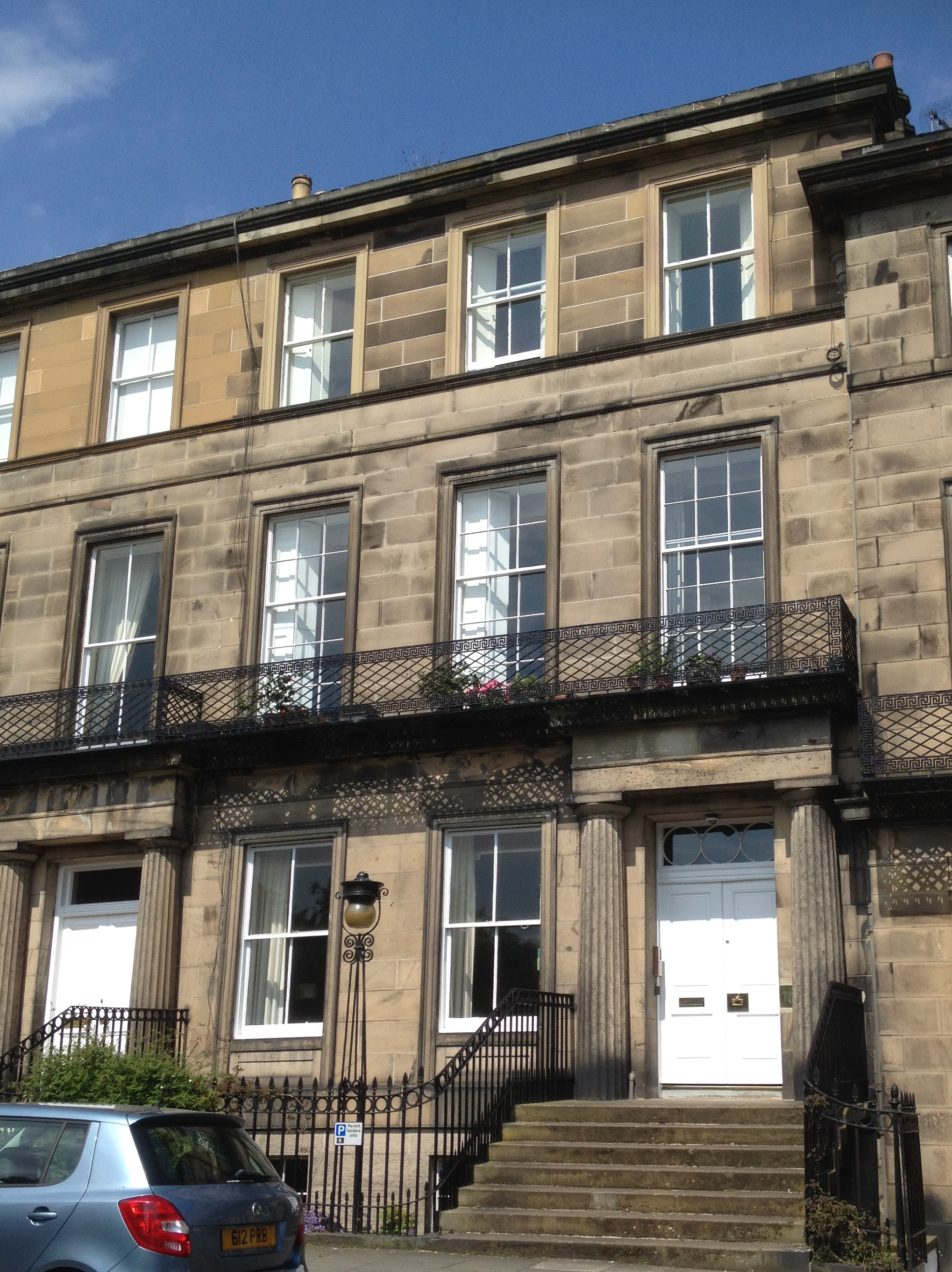
10 Regent Terrace, Edinburgh

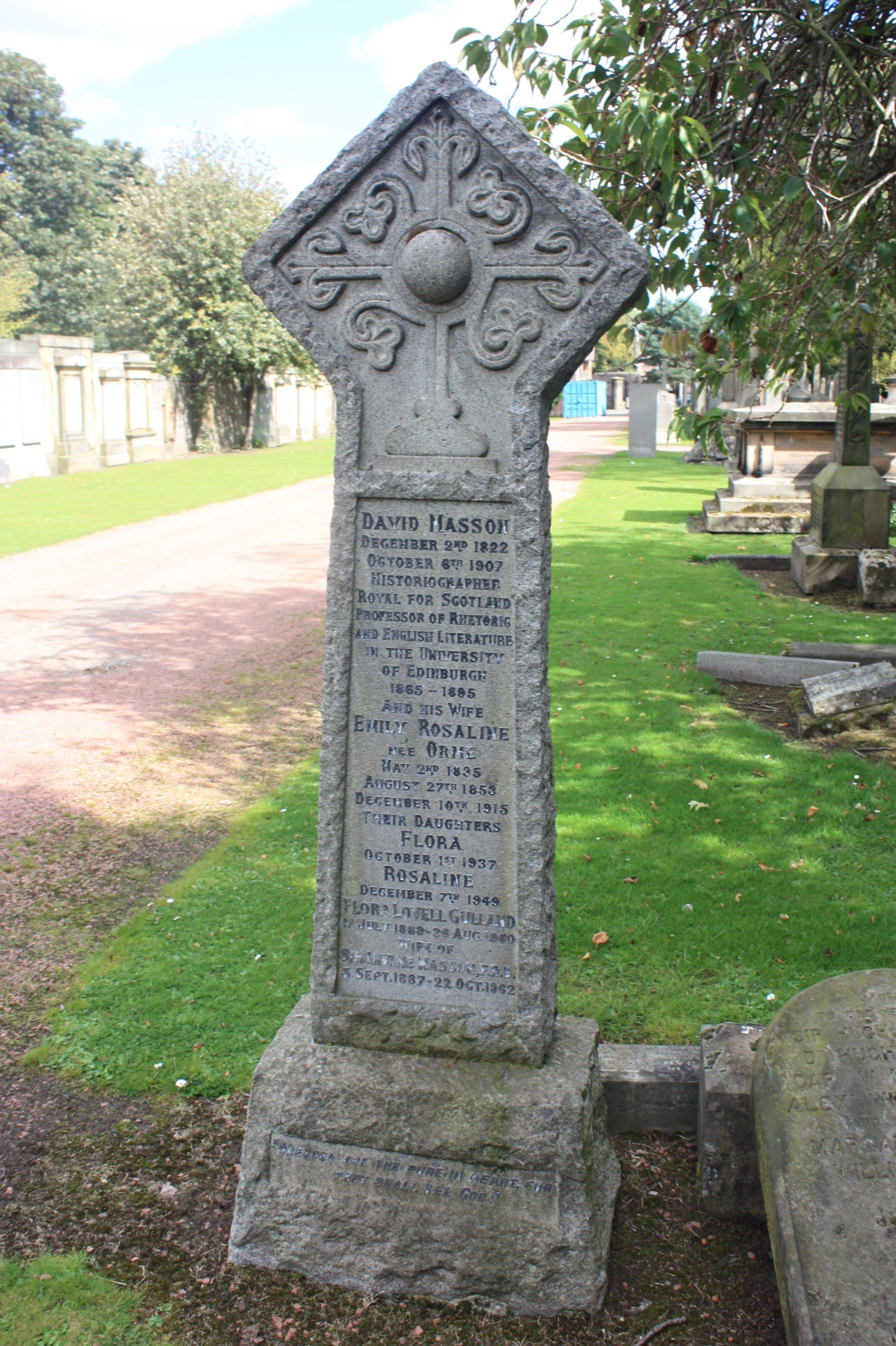
The Masson grave, Grange Cemetery

Rosaline Masson was born on 6 May 1867 in Edinburgh and was the daughter of suffrage campaigner Emily Rosaline Orme and David Masson, Professor of Rhetoric and English Literature at the University of Edinburgh. She was one of four siblings, a brother David (1858–1937), and two sisters Flora, later a nurse and suffragist, and Helen. She sometimes called herself 'Rosaline Orme Masson' perhaps in imitation of her brother, David Orme Masson, however her middle name is not listed on her birth or death certificates.

An active community campaigner throughout her life, in 1919 she became one of the first women to join the ruling Council of the influential conservationist body the Cockburn Association. Masson was involved in the organisation until 1935, writing a history of its first 50 years in 1925, Scotia's Darling Seat, 1875–1925.

She died on 7 December 1949 in Edinburgh. She is buried in Grange Cemetery with her parents.

== Literary associations ==
Through her father, Masson encountered many of the literary giants of her day who visited their family home in Edinburgh. She has many anecdotes of these encounters in her book, Poets, Patriots, and Lovers, that give insights into their personalities. For example, she has a 'hazy memory' of Thomas Carlyle "standing by my table stooping as he spread golden syrup on a slice of bread for me at my breakfast."

Later, in April 1884, aged 16, she flirted innocently with the poet Robert Browning, then aged 71, who came over to her at breakfast and said:
robert: "Why, I declare! You were going to have said good-morning to me, weren't you?"
rosaline: "Yes, I was."
robert: "Why, I declare! You were going to have given me a kiss!"
rosaline: "No, I wasn't... But if you will give me one, I will keep it all my life." (Note: This encounter took place during the Tercentenary Festival of Edinburgh University in April 1884.)

She spent a fortnight or so with the philosopher Herbert Spencer at his home in Brighton. She recalled that Spencer abhorred casual visitors. When a star struck American came to visit, he was informed that "Mr Spencer is not able to receive visitors." The American gentleman replied: "But I have come all the way from New York on purpose, Sir! I assure you that with us the name of Herbert Spencer..." But this importuning was too much for the sofa-confined philosopher who called out: "Send him away! Don’t let him come in!" The reply was: "I have heard the voice of Herbert Spencer! I can now return to New York satisfied!"

During one dinner with her family, James Barrie was not in a talkative mood. Many attempts were made to draw him out, until a lady ventured to ask "'Are you musical, Mr. Barrie?' The answer came gloomily: 'No, I’m not. I can never tell one tune from another. I dislike music.' After a moment’s pause, in the same subdued tone: 'I was musical critic on The _____ for several years.'"

== Publications ==
=== Biographies ===
- Pollock and Aytoun. Edinburgh: Oliphant, Anderson and Ferrier, 1898, ("Famous Scots Series")
- Wordsworth. London: The People's Books,1912.
- Robert Louis Stevenson. London: The People's Books, 1912.
- The life of Robert Louis Stevenson. Edinburgh & London: W. & R. Chambers, 1923.
- Poets, Patriots, and Lovers: Sketches and Memories of Famous People. London: James Clarke & Co. Ltd., [1933].

=== Histories ===
- Scotia's Darling Seat, 1875–1925 ... Illustrated, etc. Edinburgh: R. Grant & Son, 1926
- A Short History of Scotland the Nation. London: Thomas Nelson & Sons Ltd., 1942.
- Scotland the Nation. Edinburgh: Thomas Nelson & Sons Ltd., [1934]
- Edinburgh. Described by Rosaline Masson, painted by John Fulleylove, London: Adam and Charles Black, 1904.

=== Edited works ===
- Three centuries of English poetry: being selections from Chaucer to Herrick: with introductions and notes. London: Macmillan & Co., 1876.
- In Praise of Edinburgh. An anthology in prose and verse, (selected and edited), London: Constable & Co, 1912
- I can remember Robert Louis Stevenson. (edited), Edinburgh & London: W. & R. Chambers, 1923.
- Shakespeare personally ... Edited and arranged by Rosaline Masson. London: Smith, Elder & Co., 1914.
- Use and Abuse of English: a hand-book of composition ... Fourth edition – revised. Edinburgh: James Thin, 1924

=== Novels and stories ===
- My Poor Niece and other stories. London: T. F. Unwin, 1893
- A Departure from Tradition, and other stories. London: Bliss Sands & Co., 1898
- The Transgressors. London: Hodder & Stoughton, 1899
- In Our Town. [A novel], London: Hodder & Stoughton, 1901
- Leslie Farquhar. London: John Murray, 1902
- Our Bye-Election. Bristol: J. W. Arrowsmith, 1908
- Nina. London: Macmillan & Co., 1911
- A Better Man. London & Edinburgh: W. & R. Chambers, [1928].

== Sources ==
- Births and deaths information available at the General Register Office for Scotland, Scotlands People Centre in Edinburgh, and also at ScotlandsPeople
- Poets, Patriots, and Lovers : Sketches and Memories of Famous People, London : James Clarke & Co. Ltd., [1933].
- British Library catalogue: The British Library
- Welcome to Open Library | Open Library
