= Marnie Bassett =

Australian historian, biographer and travel writer

Marnie Bassett FAHA
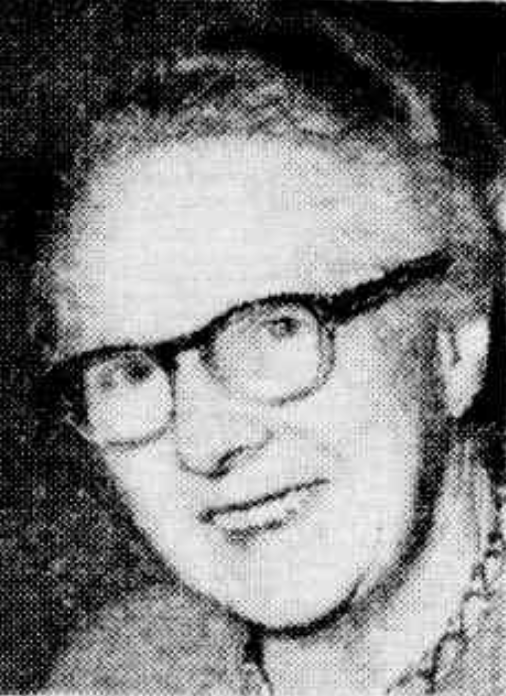
- Marnie Bassett, c.1954
- Born: Flora Marjorie Masson; 30 June 1889; Melbourne, Victoria, Australia
- Died: 3 February 1980 (aged 90)
- Occupations: Author, historian, biographer, travel writer
- Spouse: Walter Bassett
- Parent: Sir David Orme Masson
- Relatives: Irvine Masson (brother)

Flora Marjorie (Marnie) Bassett FAHA (30 June 1889 – 3 February 1980) was an Australian historian, biographer and travel writer. Her writing focussed on women's and family history, with particular attention to people from Australia.

== Early life ==
Bassett was born in Melbourne to academic parents, Sir David Orme Masson, a professor of chemistry, and Mary Masson, née Struthers. Her brother was Sir James Irvine Orme Masson. She grew up in and around the University of Melbourne. During her childhood, she and her family went on three trips to Europe, which allowed for her love of history, literature and music to grow.

Bassett received most of her education at home from governesses, although when she was 17 she attended the Church of England Girls' Grammar School for twelve weeks. She attended shorthand and typing lessons, allowing for her to become her father's secretary. She assisted him in organising the 1914 Melbourne conference of the British Association for the Advancement of Science where she met renowned scientists, among them being her future brother-in-law, Anthropologist Bronislaw Malinowski. Even though Basset's mother was did not encourage degree courses for girls, in her early twenties she decided to attend history lectures at the university due to her immense interest in the subject, particularly those of Ernest Scott. Scott encouraged her historical studies, and in 1913, after studying neglected papers, she published a note in the University Review on the founding of the University of Melbourne. Although her research has now been disproven, she is still praised for her use of initiative, perceptiveness and unusual historical aptitude . At Scott's request, in 1915, she lectured French colonial policy to his history students, and later on in that year she was awarded a government research scholarship.

During the First World War, she became a secretary to Professor Richard Berry who worked in the 5th Australian General Hospital before she could complete her work. After he was succeeded by Sir David Rivett, she continued her duties with him, transferring to Caulfield to work with him in the 11th Australian General Hospital. In 1916, she sailed to England, where her ship, the Arabia, was torpedoed in the eastern Mediterranean, yet she managed to escape in a lifeboat before she was rescued. In London, she worked alongside Sir Henry Barraclough, who was the honorary lieutenant colonel in charge of Australian munitions workers in both England and France. During her time in London she wrote lively letters back to her Father in Australia defending democracy.

== Marriage and children ==
Upon her return to Melbourne, she met Sir Walter Bassett, a senior lecturer in engineering; they were married on 25 January 1923 by Rev. Dr Edward Sugden of Queen's college at her father's university home. Bassett was devoted to her husband and her three children, refusing to hire a nanny to watch them. She was not able to resume much of her scholarly work until her fifties due to the duties she took on as both a wife and mother. However, she did maintain an active member of the Catalysts, a society of professional women, for over sixty years where she wrote some of her most vigorous and evocative writing.

== Selected works ==
The Governor's Lady (1940) was a study of Anna Josepha King, who was married to Philip Gidley King, and was the first woman to come to Australia as a governor's wife. This was a very early entry in the field that became women's history. This was followed by The Hentys (1954), an account of the Henty family's trials along the Swan River, in Van Diemen's Land and finally in the Port Phillip District now in Victoria. This book has been praised as "combining diligent research, intelligent handling of historical evidence, and a prose style that is clear and harmonious." Bassett wrote many articles for the Australian Dictionary of Biography.

Bassett also published two books on the voyages of discovery, entitled Realms and Islands (1962) and Behind the Picture (1966). She also described her travels in a volume entitled Letters from New Guinea, 1921 (1969). Her writings on Henry Gisborne (Henry Fyshe Gisborne and 'Once Upon a Time' (1985)) were published posthumously.

== Awards ==
- 1968 Honorary Doctorate in Literature degree from Monash University
- 1969 Foundation Fellow of the Australian Academy of the Humanities
- 1971 Fellow of the Royal Historical Society of Victoria
- 1974 Honorary Doctorate in Literature degree from the University of Melbourne

== Bibliography ==
- Blainey, Ann (1993) "Bassett, Lady Flora Marjorie (Marnie) (1889-1980)" Australian Dictionary of Biography Volume 13, Melbourne University Press, pp 127–128.
- Wilde, William H.; Hooton, Joy W. and Andrews, B. G. (eds.) (1994) "Bassett, Marnie" The Oxford Companion to Australian Literature Oxford University Press, OCLC 32470151
