= David Masson =

Scottish academic, literary critic and historian (1822–1907)

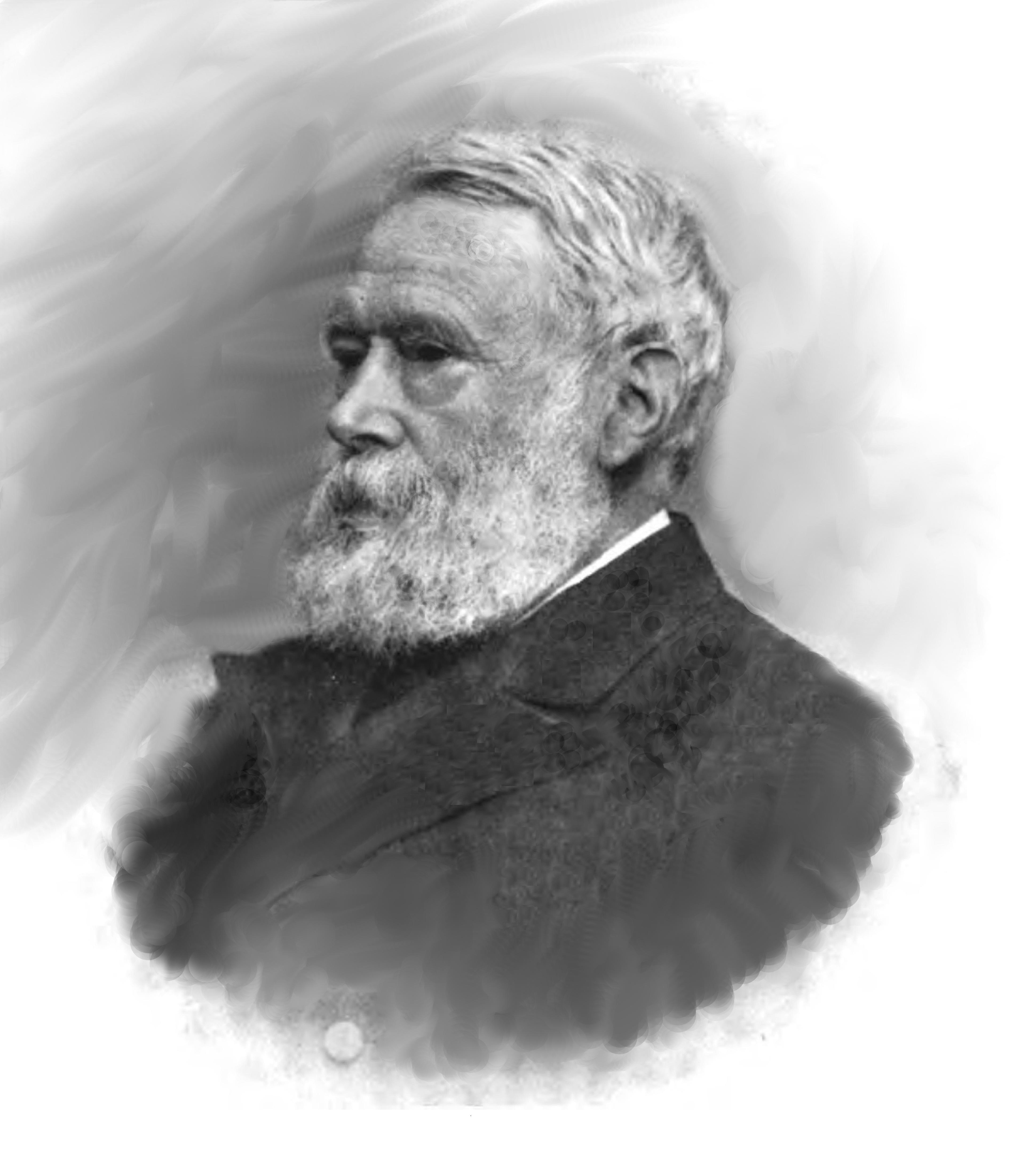
David Masson

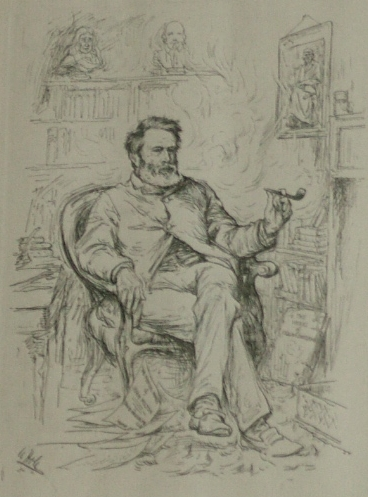
David Masson – portrait by William Hole

David Mather Masson FRSE RSA (2 December 1822 – 6 October 1907), was a Scottish academic, supporter of women's suffrage, literary critic and historian.

== Biography ==
Masson was born in Aberdeen, the son of Sarah Mather and William Masson, a stone-cutter.

He was educated at Aberdeen Grammar School under James Melvin and at Marischal College, University of Aberdeen. Intending to enter the Church, he proceeded to the University of Edinburgh where he studied theology under Thomas Chalmers. Masson remained friendly with Chalmers until his death 1847. However, abandoning his aspirations to the ministry, be returned to Aberdeen to undertake the editorship of the Banner, a weekly paper devoted to the advocacy of Free Kirk principles. After two years he resigned this post and went back to Edinburgh to pursue a purely literary career. There he wrote a great deal, contributing to Fraser's Magazine, Dublin University Magazine (in which appeared his essays on Thomas Chatterton) and other periodicals. In 1847 he went to London, where he found a wider scope for his energy and knowledge.

He was a secretary of the Society of the Friends of Italy (1851–1852). In a famous interview with Elizabeth Barrett Browning at Florence, he contested her admiration for Napoleon III. He had known Thomas de Quincey, whose biography he contributed in 1878 to the "English Men of Letters" series, and he was an enthusiastic friend and admirer of Thomas Carlyle. In 1852 he was appointed a professor of English literature at University College, London, in succession to A H Clough, and for some years from 1858, he edited the newly established Macmillan's Magazine. In 1865 he was selected for the chair of rhetoric and English literature at Edinburgh, and during the early years of his professorship actively promoted the movement for the university education of women. He also supported his wife Emily Rosaline Orme and two of their daughters in the women's suffrage movement, speaking at events in Edinburgh and London. In 1879 he became editor of the Register of the Privy Council of Scotland, and in 1886 gave the Rhind Lectures on that subject. In 1893 he was appointed Historiographer Royal for Scotland. Two years later he resigned his professorship. Shortly before he retired he became a member of the Scottish Arts Club. In 1896 he was President of the Edinburgh Sir Walter Scott Club and gave the Toast to Sir Walter at the club's annual dinner. By 1900 he was Chairman of the Scottish History Society.

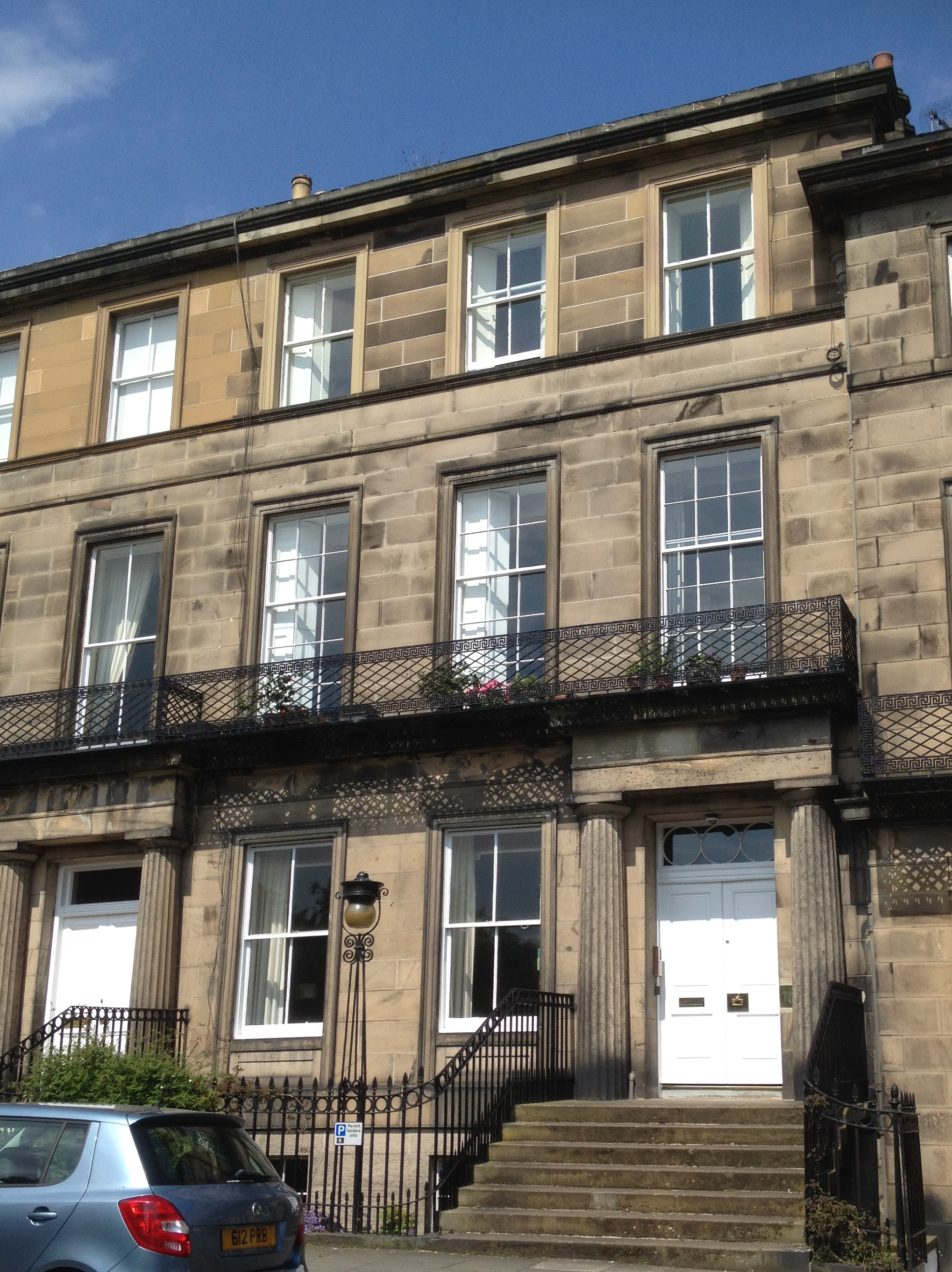
10 Regent Terrace, Edinburgh

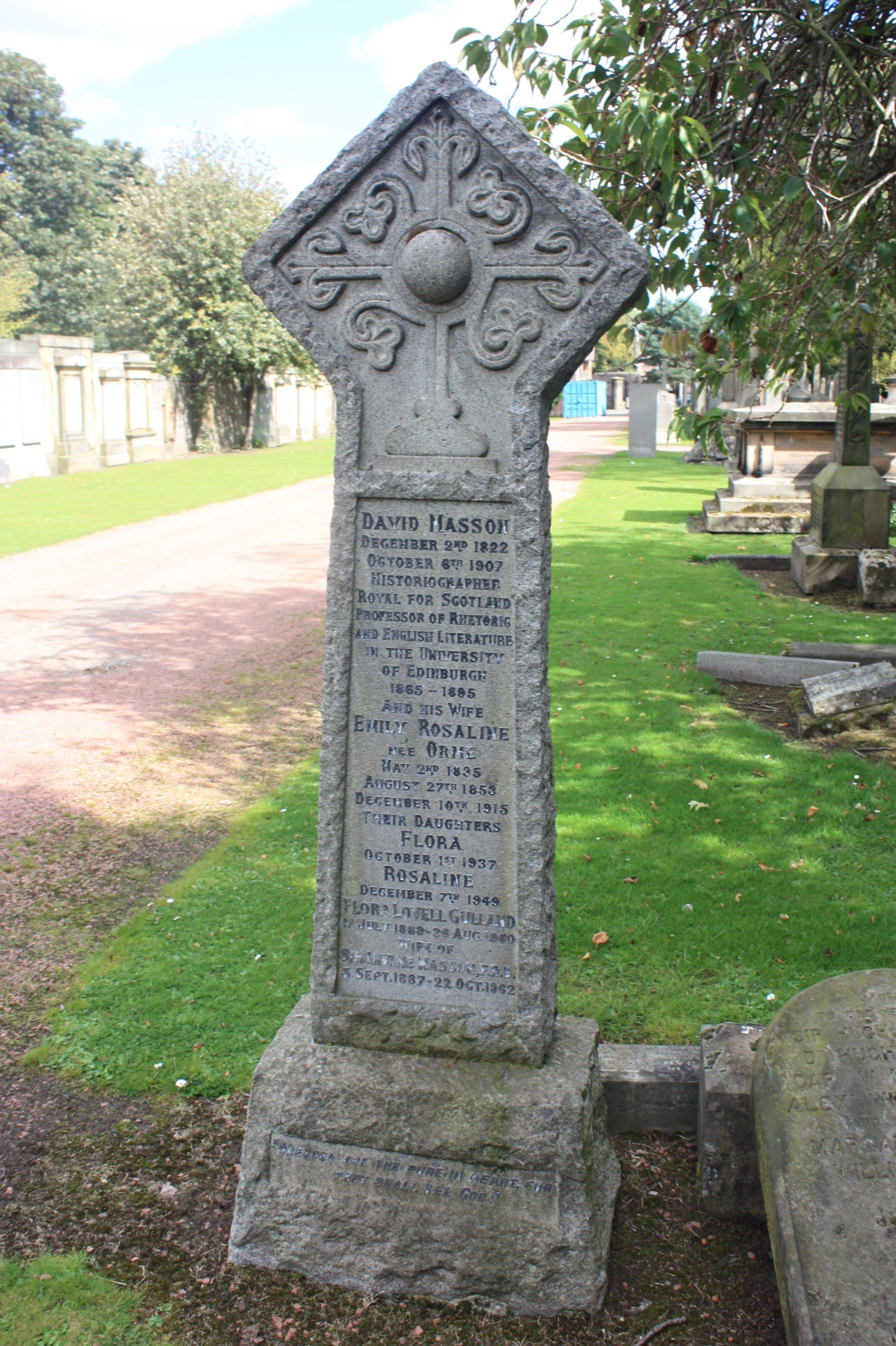
David Masson's grave, Grange Cemetery

When he first arrived in Edinburgh in 1865, Masson lived in Rosebery Crescent, then he lived at 10 Regent Terrace from 1869 to 1882 before moving to Great King Street. Among the friends who visited him were the philosopher John Stuart Mill and the historian Thomas Carlyle. J.M. Barrie was a student of Masson in 1878–1882, and Masson is credited with being the future dramatist's literary mentor.

A bust of Masson was presented to the Senate of the University of Edinburgh in 1897.

In 1900–1901 Masson is listed as living at 2 Lockharton Gardens in south-west Edinburgh (designed by Sir James Gowans).

He died in Edinburgh and is buried in the north-west section of Grange Cemetery in Edinburgh next to the main north path.

== Family ==
In London on 17 August 1854, Masson married Emily Rosaline Orme, a noted campaigner for women's suffrage in Scotland. Their son, David Orme Masson, became the first Professor of Chemistry at the University of Melbourne, and a KBE. Their daughter Rosaline was an author and novelist, and Flora Masson was a noted nurse and suffragist. Their third daughter Helen married Dr George Lovell Gulland.

His grandsons include the chemists John Masson Gulland (1898–1947) and James I. O. Masson.

== Recognition ==
The Masson Hall of Residence–the university's first 'proper' accommodation for female students–in the Grange was named after him.

A building at the University of Edinburgh's Pollock Halls of Residence is named after Masson. Built in the 1990s, Masson House is used as a three-star year-round hotel, rather than student accommodation.

== Works ==
His magnum opus is his Life of Milton in Connexion with the History of His Own Time in six volumes, the first of which appeared in 1858 and the last in 1880. He also edited the library edition of Milton's Poetical Works (3 vols., 1874), and De Quincey's Collected Works (14 vols., 1889–1890). Among his other publications are

- The British Museum: Historical and Descriptive (1850)
- Essays, Biographical and Critical (1856, reprinted with additions, 3 vols., 1874)
- British Novelists and their Styles (1859)
- Drummond of Hawthornden (1873)
- Chatterton (1873)
- Edinburgh Sketches (1892)
- Memories of Two Cities, Edinburgh and Aberdeen (1911)
