= La Courneuve–Aubervilliers station =

Railway station in La Courneuve, France

La Courneuve – Aubervilliers
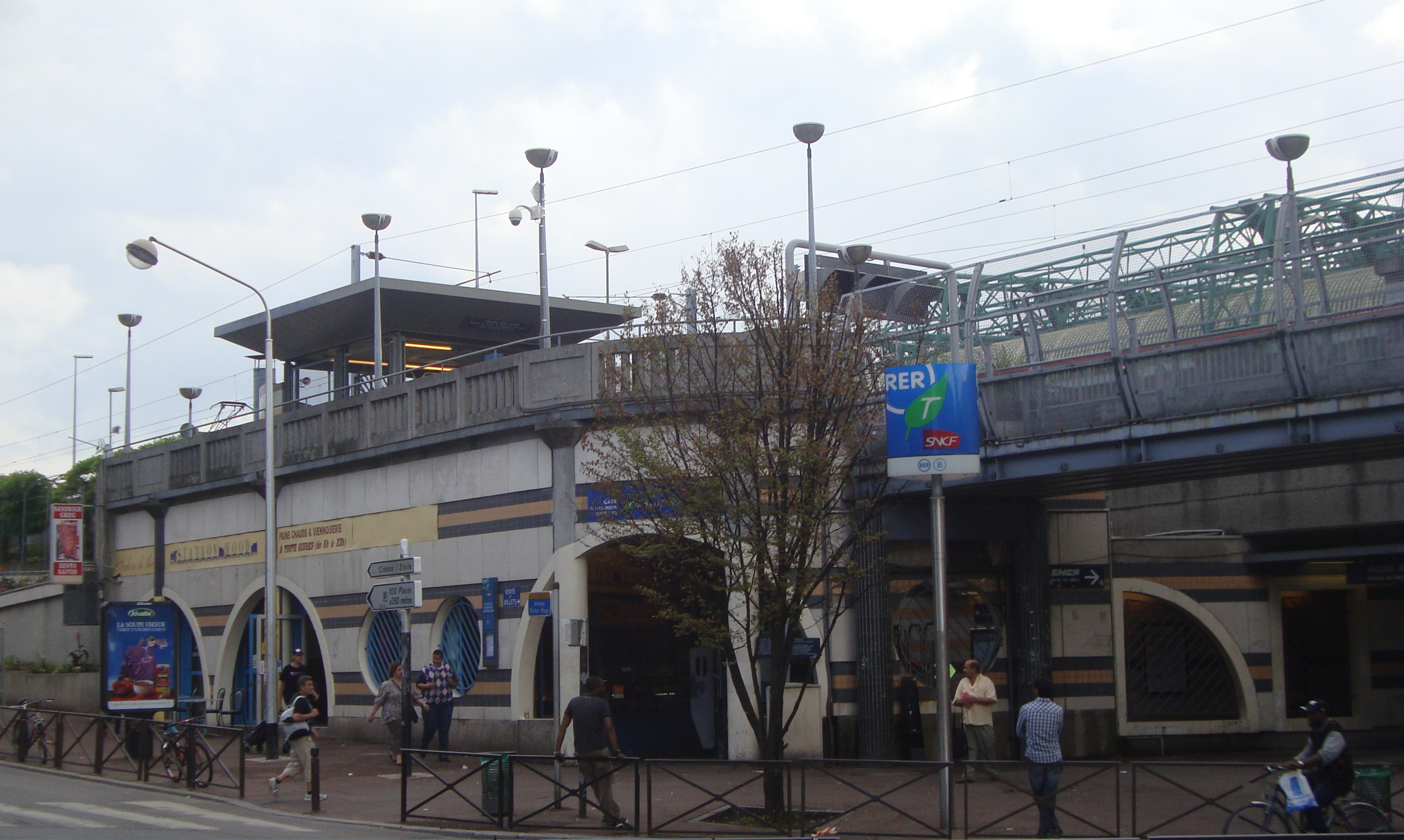
- Entrance to La Courneuve – Aubervilliers station

General information
- Location: Avenue Victor Hugo; La Courneuve; France
- Coordinates: 48°55′26″N 2°23′04″E
- Operator: SNCF
- Tracks: 4

Construction
- Accessible: Yes, by prior reservation

Other information
- Station code: 87271304
- Fare zone: 3

History
- Opened: 1885

Passengers
- 2024: 16,101,629

Services
Preceding station	RER	Following station
Le Bourget towards Aéroport Charles de Gaulle 2 TGV or Mitry–Claye	RER B	La Plaine–Stade de France towards Robinson or Saint-Rémy-lès-Chevreuse
Location

La Courneuve – Aubervilliers station is a station on the line B of the Réseau Express Régional, a hybrid suburban commuter and rapid transit line. It is named after the town of La Courneuve where the station is located, and the nearby town of Aubervilliers, both northern suburbs of Paris, in the Seine-Saint-Denis department of France.

== See also ==
- List of stations of the Paris RER
