= Emily Rosaline Orme =

Scottish suffragist (1835–1915)

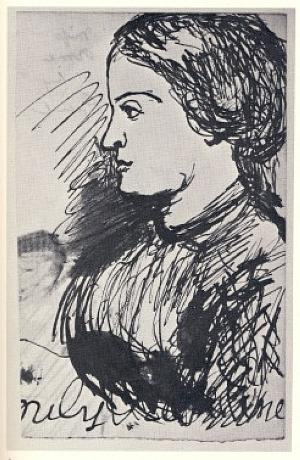
- c. 1853 by Dante Rossetti
- Born: 1835
- Died: 1915 (aged 80)
- Other names: married name Masson
- Known for: Campaigner for women's suffrage
- Spouse: David Masson
- Children: Flora Masson; Rosaline Masson; David Orme Masson
- Relatives: Eliza Orme

Emily Rosaline Orme (1835–1915) was a Scottish suffragist. She was the leader of the Edinburgh National Society for Women's Suffrage.

== Early life ==
Orme was born in 1835, one of eight children to parents Eliza Andrews (1816–1892) and Charles Orme (c. 1807–1893), from a wealthy brewing and distilling family. In her early years at Avenue Road in Regent's Park, London she met leading members of the Pre-Raphaelite movement such as Holman Hunt, the Rossettis and Thomas Woolner. The closeness of the family to this movement is shown in an informal sketch of Orme by Dante Gabriel Rossetti, when she was about 18 years old.

Orme was also introduced to the academic David Masson (1822–1907), by the librarian at the British Museum, Coventry Patmore. Patmore, who was also a poet and critic, was married to her maternal aunt, the author and Pre-Raphaelite muse Emily Augusta Patmore (née Andrews; 1824–1862). Patmore wrote the poem The Angel in the House which ironically was praising the female sphere as domestic and family and male as public sphere.

== Marriage ==
Orme married Masson on 27 August 1853, moving initially into her parents' home and sharing friends with political, artistic and literary interests. The philosopher and women's suffrage supporter John Stuart Mill visited them there, and also spoke at Edinburgh later on the topic of women's suffrage.

The couple moved to Edinburgh in 1865 when her husband took up the professorial chair of rhetoric and English at the University of Edinburgh, and he strongly supported movement for the university education of women, and was one of the first professors to lecture to women at the Edinburgh Ladies' Education Association, and he also supported medical education for women. They lived first at Rosebury Crescent, then 10 Regent Terrace from 1869 to 1882 before moving to Great King Street, and finally Lockharton Gardens.

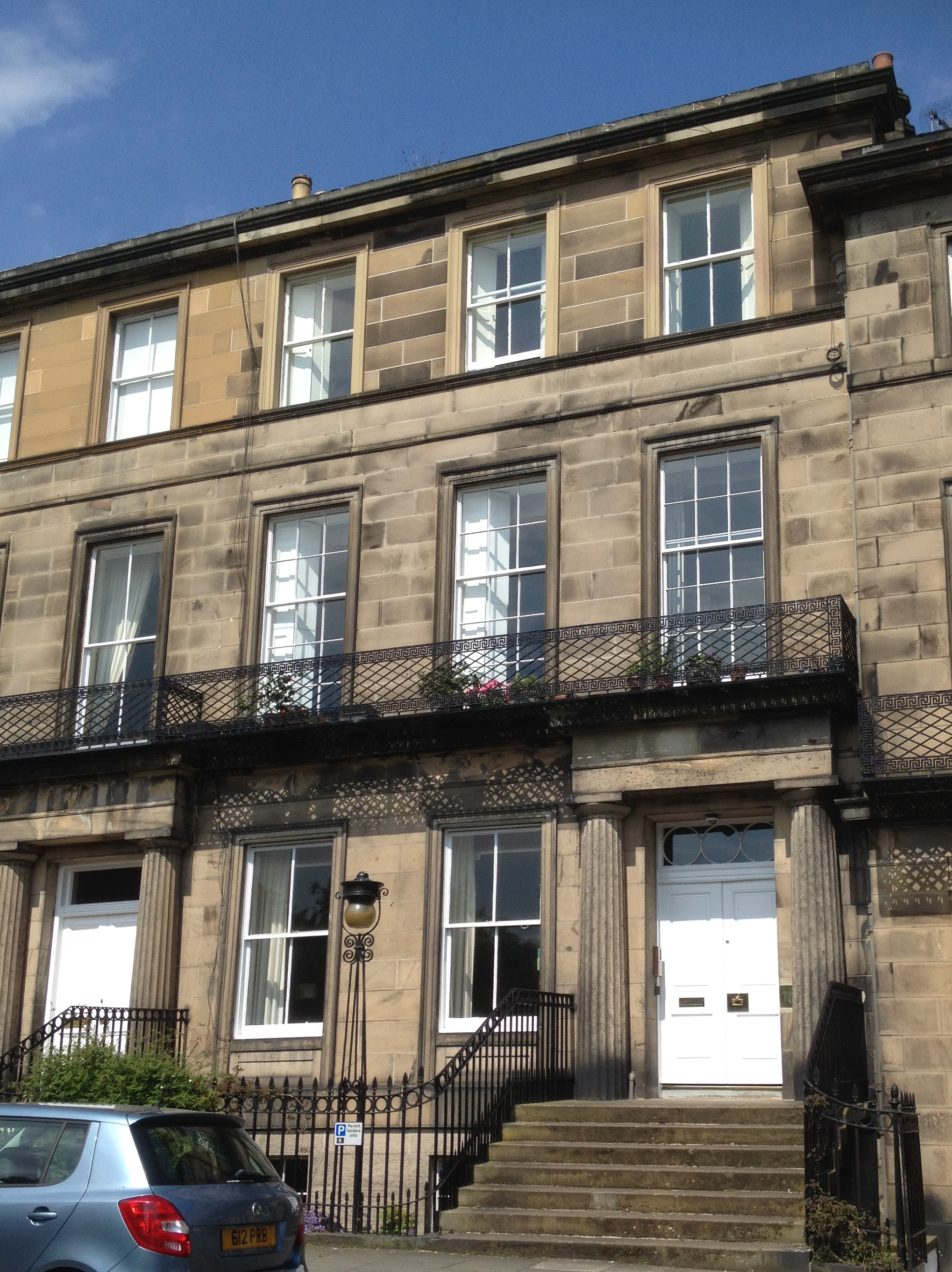
10 Regent Terrace, Edinburgh

== Suffrage and later life ==
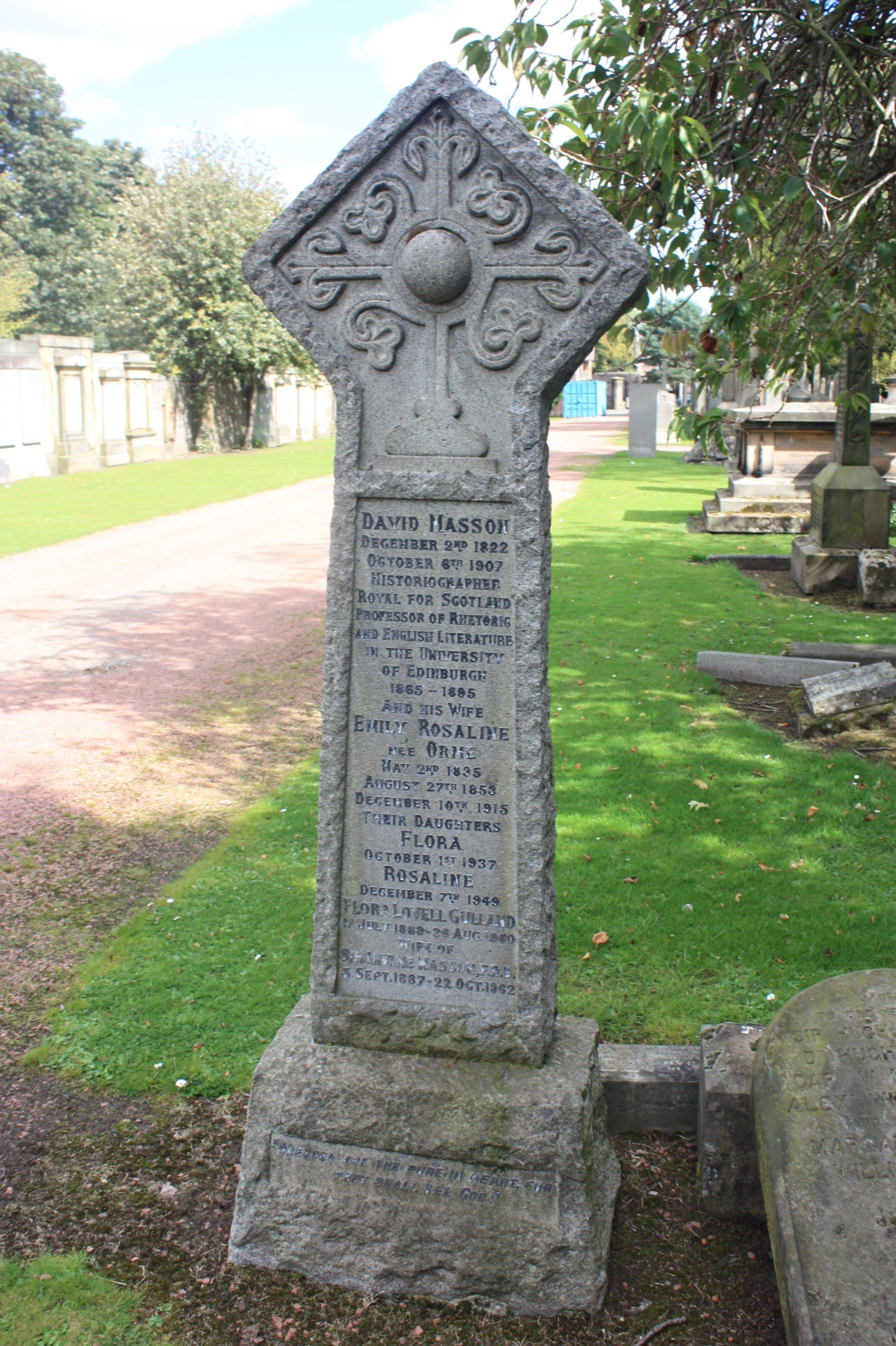
David Masson's grave, Grange Cemetery

Orme and her husband were leading activists in the campaign for women's suffrage and spoke at events in London and Edinburgh. Orme joined the suffrage group, the Edinburgh National Society for Women's Suffrage in 1874, two years later became a member of its executive committee and then joint honorary secretary with Eliza Wigham from 1877. At the end of November and beginning of December 1877, there were a series of meetings around Edinburgh where Orme was a main speaker. Orme and other women went from Edinburgh to the 'grand demonstration' in London on 6 May 1880.

In 1881, her daughter Flora Masson joined the Edinburgh Ladies Debating Society with her mother and questions of suffrage were debated by the group regularly.

Orme's husband, David Masson died in 1907, and she and her daughters informed the press that no one was to write a biography or publish his letters.

Orme died in 1915 and was buried with her husband in Grange Cemetery in south Edinburgh.

== Family ==
Her daughters Flora Masson (1856–1937), a nurse, and Rosaline Masson, an author, also joined the suffrage movement. Orme had another daughter Helen and a son Sir David Orme Masson who became the first professor of chemistry at the University of Melbourne. Her sister Eliza Orme was the first woman to gain a law degree in England. Her younger brother Augustus Charles Andrews became a bank clerk and his daughter Mabel Barltrop became a religious leader and prophet in Bedford.
