= David Orme Masson =

Australian chemist and professor

Sir David Orme Masson KBE FRS FRSE
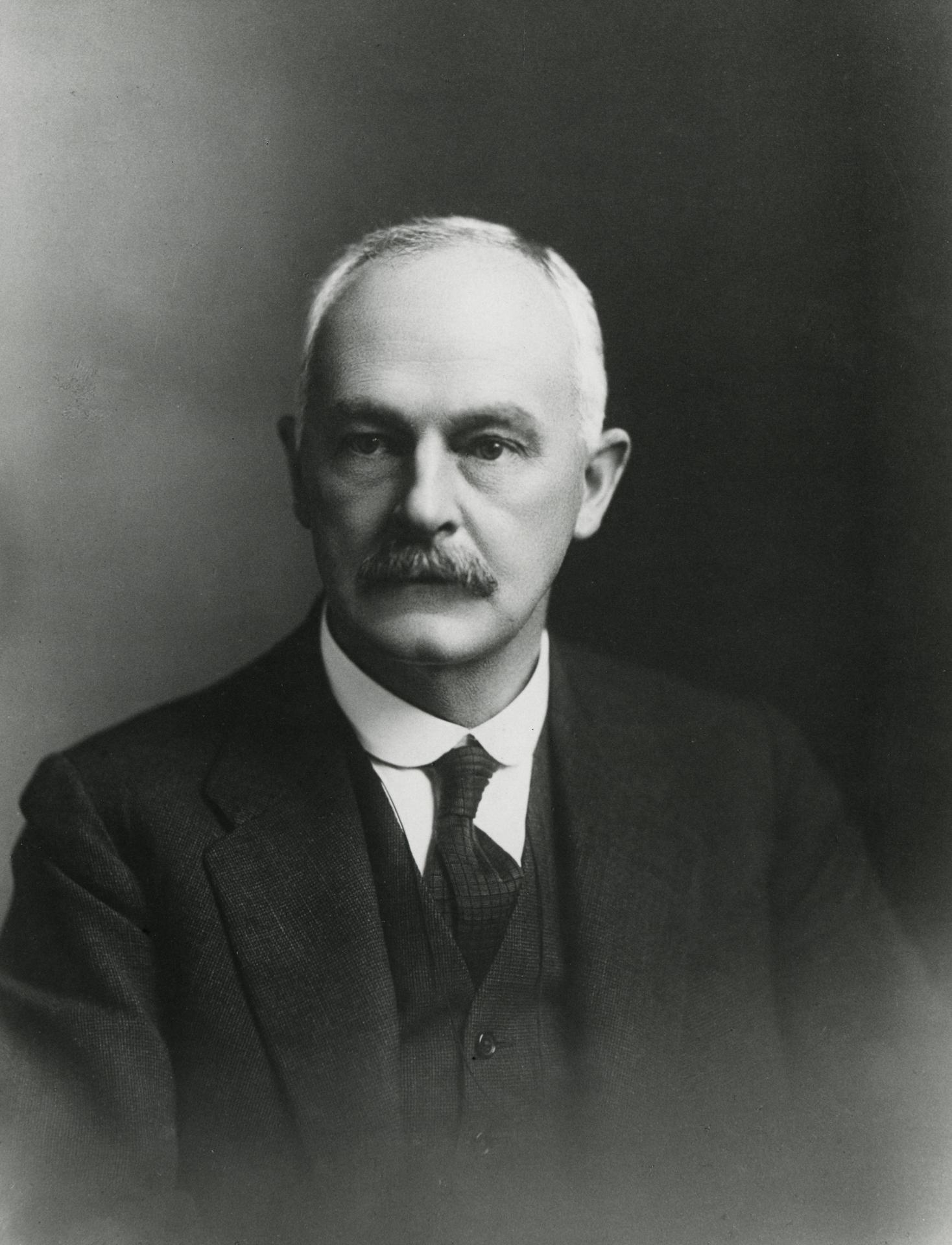
- Masson c. 1930
- Born: 13 January 1858; Hampstead, UK
- Died: 10 August 1937 (aged 79); South Yarra, Victoria, Australia
- Education: University of Edinburgh
- Known for: Work on nitroglycerin
- Spouse: Mary Struthers (m. 1886)
- Children: Irvine Masson; Marnie Bassett; Elsie Rosaline Masson
- Scientific career
- Fields: Chemistry
- Workplaces: University of Melbourne

Sir David Orme Masson KBE FRS FRSE (13 January 1858 – 10 August 1937) was a scientist born in England who emigrated to Australia to become Professor of Chemistry at the University of Melbourne. He is known for his work on the explosive compound nitroglycerin.

== Early life ==
Masson was born in Hampstead (near London), the only son and second child of English suffragist Emily Rosaline Orme and her husband, David Mather Masson, Professor of English Literature at University College London. His father later became Professor of Rhetoric and English Literature at the University of Edinburgh in 1865.

Masson was educated at Oliphant's School in Edinburgh (1865–68), the Edinburgh Academy and then the University of Edinburgh, where he graduated MA in 1877. He studied chemistry under Alexander Crum Brown. He then studied under Friedrich Wöhler at Göttingen in 1879 before returning to Edinburgh in 1881.He obtained his DSc degree in 1884.

Masson was involved in the founding of the Student Representative Council and studied the properties of nitroglycerin (glyceryl trinitrate).

In 1885 he was elected a Fellow of the Royal Society of Edinburgh. His proposers were Alexander Crum Brown, Arthur Mitchell, John Murray, and Peter Guthrie Tait.

== Marriage and children ==
In 1884, Masson met Mary Struthers, daughter of John Struthers, and they were engaged soon after. However, they held off on marriage until Masson could find a secure appointment. In 1886, he was offered an appointment at the University of Melbourne in Australia, and they were subsequently married on 5 August 1886 in Aberdeen, and moved to Australia a few weeks later.

== Career in Australia ==
In October 1886 Masson arrived with his new wife in Australia to take up the position as Professor of Chemistry at the University of Melbourne.

In 1903, Masson was elected a Fellow of the Royal Society, London.

Masson participated in the organisation of Douglas Mawson's 1911 expedition to the Antarctic.

In 1912 Masson became President of the Professorial Board, undertaking work that would be done today by a paid Vice-Chancellor, as well as scientific work in connection with World War I.

He was created CBE in 1918 and KBE in 1922.

He founded both the Melbourne University Chemical Society and the Society of Chemical Industry of Victoria.

He was the first president of the Australian Chemical Institute (1917–20).

With Edgeworth David, he co-founded the Australian National Research Council. He served as its president from 1922 to 1926.

== Late life ==
Masson died of cancer in South Yarra, Melbourne on 10 August 1937.

== Bibliography ==
- Masson of Melbourne, The Life and Times of David Orme Masson, Len Weickhardt, Royal Australian Chemical Institute, 1989.
