= Jane Shaw =

British academic and priest

The Reverend Jane Shaw FRHistS
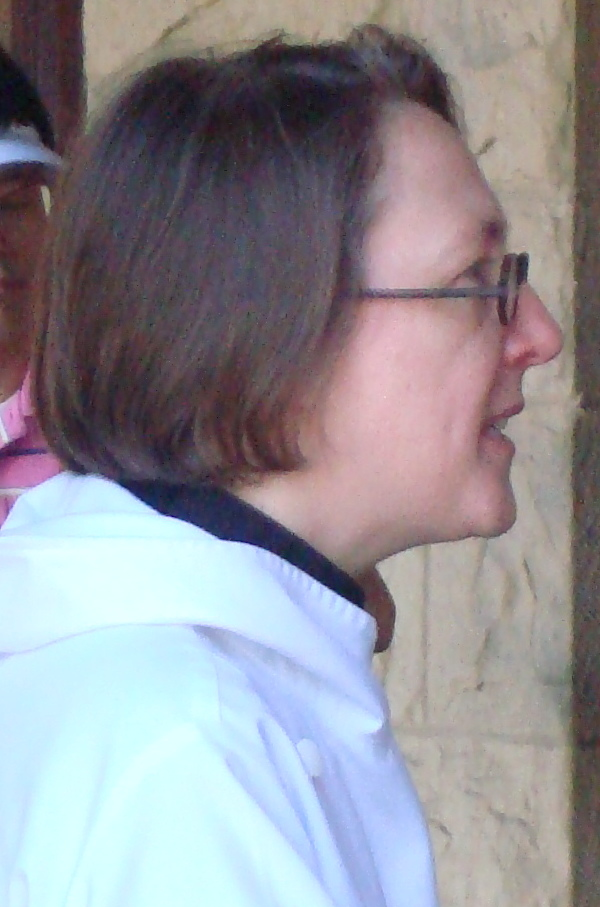
- Shaw in 2009, at Stanford University

Provost of Gresham College
- Incumbent
- Assumed office December 2025

Personal details
- Born: 1963 (age 62–63) Norwich, Norfolk, United Kingdom
- Education: Norwich High School for Girls
- Alma mater: Regent's Park College, Oxford (BA); Harvard University (MDiv); U.C. Berkeley (PhD)
- Occupation: Historian · Professor · Anglican priest · academic administration

Jane Alison Shaw FRHistS (born 1963) is a British historian of religion and Anglican priest. She is professor of the history of religion at the University of Oxford and will be from December 2025 provost of Gresham College. Previously she was principal of Harris Manchester College, Oxford, professor of religious studies and dean of religious life at Stanford University and Dean of Grace Cathedral in San Francisco.

== Early life and education ==
Jane Shaw grew up in Norwich, England, on the grounds of the Great Hospital, a medieval hospital with its own chapel and cloisters where her father was master. She attended Norwich High School for Girls. She studied modern history at University of Oxford, graduating with a Bachelor of Arts (BA) degree in 1985. She went on to study theology at Harvard University, graduating with a Master of Divinity (MDiv) degree in 1988. She completed a PhD in history at the University of California, Berkeley in 1994. She has received honorary doctorates from the Episcopal Divinity School and Colgate University.

== Career ==
Shaw taught history and theology at Oxford University for 16 years. She was the first female fellow of Regent's Park College, Oxford from 1994 to 2001 (dean, 1998–2001). Having trained in the St Albans and Oxford Ministry Course, she was ordained in the Church of England as a deacon in 1997 and as a priest in 1998. She served her curacy at University Church of St Mary the Virgin, Oxford, as a non-stipendiary minister between 1997 and 2001. Then, in 2001, she moved to New College, Oxford, where she became the first female dean of divinity, and was elected a fellow. She was made an honorary canon of Christ Church Cathedral, Oxford in 2005, and was canon theologian of Salisbury Cathedral from 2007 to 2012.

In 2010, Shaw left Oxford to take up the position of dean of Grace Cathedral, San Francisco. In 2014, she moved to Stanford University to be professor of religious studies and dean for religious life.

In February 2018, Shaw was announced as the next principal of Harris Manchester College, Oxford. She took up the appointment on 1 October 2018. Under her leadership, the college achieved record-breaking academic standing at the University of Oxford, ranking 3rd among all colleges in the Norrington Table in 2022. She retired as Principal on 30 September 2025. She is additionally professor of the history of religion in the Faculty of Theology and Religion, and a pro-vice-chancellor without portfolio of the University of Oxford.

Shaw took up the position of chair of the board of the Pitt Rivers Museum in 2022, and chair of the management board of the Rothermere American Institute in 2020. She has held appointments as an honorary chaplain and honorary canon of Christ Church, Oxford, director of the Oxford University Summer Programme in Theology, and canon theologian of Salisbury Cathedral. She was a governor of a British boys' public school, Winchester College.

Shaw is Non-resident Long-term Fellow for Programmes in Cultural and Intellectual History at the Swedish Collegium for Advanced Study in Uppsala, Sweden.

== Writing ==
Shaw's academic writing focusses on modern religion, the arts, gender, and the impact of technology on society. Her book Gen Z, Explained, was an interdisciplinary study of Generation Z (18 to 25 year olds). As an historian, she focusses on lived religion, which Robert Orsi describes as "the volatile and unpredictable nature of religious creation". Miracles in Enlightenment England showed how the experience of miracles in Enlightenment England challenged the elites.

Her book Octavia Daughter of God won the 2012 San Francisco Book Festival History Prize. It described the life of a female Messiah figure, Mabel "Octavia" Barltrop, who lived in Bedford, England, and founded the Panacea Society in the early twentieth century. The book was commended for showing how, and under what circumstances, a religion grows. The literary critic, John Carey, writing in The Sunday Times, praised the book: "Shaw recounts the Panaceans' history with humour, sympathy and understanding". "Burrowing through the manuscripts, Shaw unearths the day-to-day gossip, tiffs and crushes that brightened community life". He admired that "her astonishing book uses this material to reveal the cosmic events that took place behind the front doors of a quiet street in Bedford". Frances Stonor Saunders, writing in The Guardian, said that Shaw "makes far too few concessions to the manifestly preposterous and delusional aspects of Mabel Barltrop's sect", and found "curious" the book's lack of information about the current finances of the Panacea Society established by Barltrop.

Shaw's work often appeals to doubt and the questioning of faith, saying, "If we think faith is about certainty then we can become arrogant and think we know God wholly and that is very limiting." Themes of loss, doubt, and forgiveness are explored in A Practical Christianity. She also focusses on art and spirituality, and what she calls "the moral imagination", which she describes as "a deep responsiveness to that which is different from us". In The Mystical Turn, a series of five programmes on BBC Radio 3, Shaw explored the relationship between spirituality and mysticism in the works of Russian artist Kandinsky and his contemporaries.

She writes for the Financial Times and Prospect magazine.

== Activism ==
Shaw has combined the work of a church historian with participation in the life of the Anglican churches and campaigning for the ordination of women to the priesthood and the episcopate. She was vice-chair of WATCH Women and the Church. She writes for The Times and the Guardian on issues pertaining to politics, religion, and the arts. Shaw was an original member of a thinktank, the Chicago Consultation, advocating for LGBT Christians, and she has worked with V-Day on behalf of women who are victims of violence. In 2013, she joined the board of the NGO Human Rights Watch in California.

== Selected publications ==
- Roberta Katz; Sarah Ogilvie; Jane Shaw; Linda Woodhead (2022). Gen Z, Explained. Chicago: University of Chicago Press. ISBN 978-0226823966.
- Jane Shaw (2006). Miracles in Enlightenment England. New Haven and London: Yale University Press. ISBN 9780300112726.
- Jane Shaw (2011). Octavia, Daughter of God: the story of a female messiah and her followers. London: Jonathan Cape. ISBN 9780224075008.
- Jane Shaw (2012). A Practical Christianity. London: SPCK. ISBN 9780281068166.
- Jane Shaw (2018). Pioneers of Modern Spirituality. London: Darton, Longman and Todd. ISBN 9780232532869.
