= Mrs Coventry Patmore (Millais painting) =

1851 painting by John Everett Millais

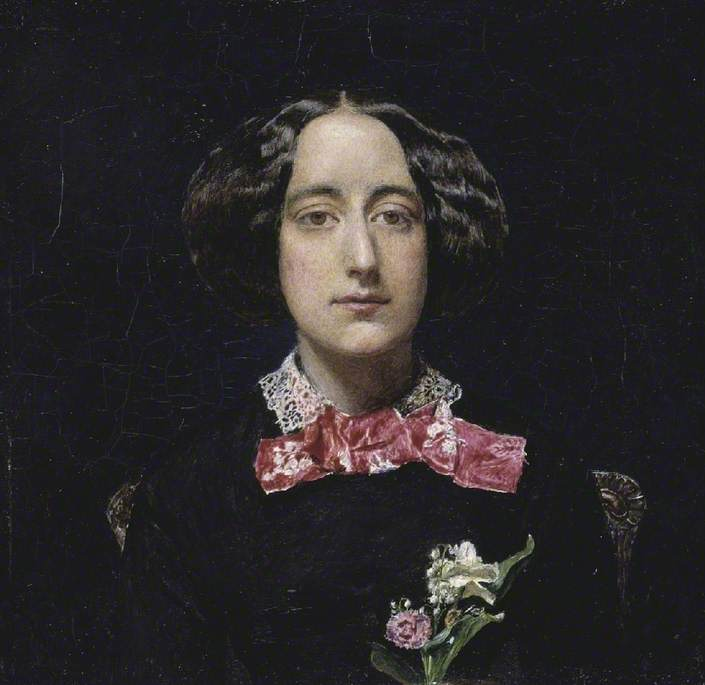
- Artist: John Everett Millais
- Year: 1851
- Type: Oil on panel
- Dimensions: 19.7 cm × 20.3 cm (7.8 in × 8.0 in)
- Location: Fitzwilliam Museum, Cambridge

Mrs Coventry Patmore (less commonly known as Portrait of Mrs Coventry K. Patmore or Emily Augusta Patmore, née Andrews (1824–1862)) is an oil on canvas painting by English artist John Everett Millais, painted in 1851. It is a portrait of Emily Augusta Patmore (1824–1862), the wife of poet Coventry Patmore (1823–1896), who commissioned the portrait.

== Work ==
Millais painted the portrait of Emily Patmore in 1851, the same year he completed his painting The Woodman's Daughter, which illustrated the poem of the same name by Emily Patmore's husband, Coventry Patmore.

The painting was exhibited from 3 May to 24 July 1852 with two other paintings by Millais, Ophelia (1851–52) and A Huguenot, on St. Bartholomew's Day, Refusing to Shield Himself from Danger by Wearing the Roman Catholic Badge (1851–52), at the Royal Academy Exhibition of 1852 at the Royal Academy of Arts, London, under the title Portrait of Mrs Coventry K. Patmore (no. 156 in the catalogue).

The painting was variously owned by Coventry Patmore; then Edward Andrews, Emily Patmore's brother; then Edward Andrews's wife; then in 1892 Milnes Patmore, Emily Patmore's son; then in 1899 it was in the collection of Coventry Patmore's third wife, Harriet (Robson). It was bought by the Friends of the Fitzwilliam Museum from the Serendipity Shop, London, in 1920. The Friends gave the painting to the Fitzwilliam Museum that same year.

== See also ==
- List of paintings by John Everett Millais
