= Ellen Oliver (suffragette) =

Purity activist and Southcottian from Guernsey

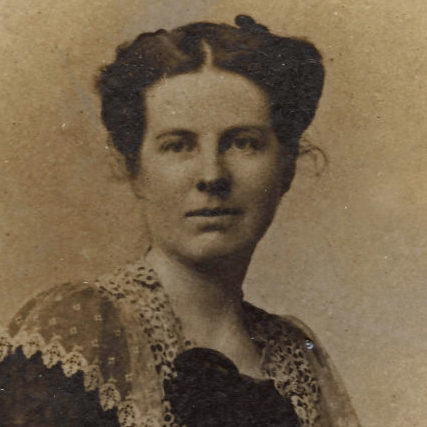
- Born: 16 July 1870; Bailiwick of Guernsey
- Died: 8 July 1921 (aged 50)
- Parent(s): Samuel Pasfield Oliver

Ellen Frederica Oliver (16 July 1870 – 8 July 1921) was a British suffragette, purity activist and a follower of the Panacea Society, who was the first person to recognise Mabel Barltrop as a prophet in the movement.

== Biography ==
Born on 16 July 1870 in Guernsey, Oliver was one of nine children of Samuel Pasfield Oliver, a geographer, and his wife Clara. Oliver's education appears to have been sporadic, and she did not learn to read and write until she was eleven years old. Independently wealthy due to her family's income, she travelled as a young woman to Mauritius (where her mother was born), New Zealand and possibly Jamaica.

After Oliver's return from travelling, she joined the suffrage movement and became a member of the Women's Social and Political Union. She was active between 1912 and 1914, volunteering a secretary to the Worthing WSPU branch during that period. She was imprisoned in Holloway Gaol as a result of her suffrage activism.

Religious, Oliver was a member of the Church League for Women's Suffrage, and was a believer in the Social purity movement. In 1914 she became aware of the teachings of Joanna Southcott, encountering them through a blue leaflet given to her after a suffrage meeting. To further her interest, Oliver began to write letters with another Southcottian, Mabel Barltrop, who had established an organisation called the Panacea Society that same year. Oliver moved to Bedford, to live as part of the Panacea community.

In the Southcottian movement, there was understood to be a lineage of prophets, all with the name of 'Shiloh', who are the spiritual children of Southcott. On 14 February 1919 Oliver declared that Mabel Barltrop was the ninth prophet. Balthrop later appointed her as an apostle. The Panacea Society's first community house was at 5 Albany Road, Bedford, which Oliver co-funded the purchase of with other members. Oliver died on 8 July 1921, due to cancer. She is buried in Foster Hill Road Cemetery, Bedford.
