= Ellen Oliver =

Ellen Oliver may refer to:

- Ellen Oliver (suffragette) (1870–1921), British suffragette
- Ellen Oliver Van Fleet (1842–1893), American poet and hymnwriter
