= Samuel Pasfield Oliver =

British army officer, geographer and antiquary

Samuel Pasfield Oliver (1838–1907) was an English artillery officer, geographer and antiquary.

== Life ==
Born at Bovinger, Essex, on 30 October 1838, he was the eldest and only surviving son of William Macjanley Oliver, rector of Bovinger, by his wife Jane Weldon. He entered Eton College in 1853; and after passing through the Royal Military Academy, Woolwich, he received a commission in the Royal Artillery on 1 April 1859. In the following year he went out with his battery to China, where hostilities had been renewed. The First Convention of Beijing was however signed soon after Oliver's arrival (24 October 1860), and his service was confined to garrison duty at Canton.

On the establishment of a British embassy at Beijing in 1861 he accompanied General Sir John Michel on a visit to the capital, and subsequently made a tour through Japan. In the following year he was transferred to Mauritius; and from there with Major-general Johnstone on a mission to Madagascar to congratulate King Radama II on his accession. He spent some months exploring the island, and witnessed the king's coronation at Antananarivo (23 September). A second brief visit to the island followed in June 1863, when Oliver, after King Radama's assassination, was again despatched to Madagascar on board HMS Rapid.

On his return to Mauritius he studied the flora and fauna of the Mascarene Islands. In 1864 the volcanic eruption on the island of Réunion gave him the opportunity of recording geological phenomena.

Oliver returned to England with his battery in 1865. In 1867 he joined Captain Bedford Pim's exploring expedition to Central America. A route was cut and levelled across Nicaragua from Monkey Point to Port Realejo; and it was proposed that this route might be more practicable than that projected by Ferdinand de Lesseps for the Panama Canal.

Oliver was promoted captain in 1871, and was appointed superintendent of fortifications on the Cornish coast in 1873. After serving on the staff of the intelligence branch of the quartermaster-general's department he was sent to St. Helena on garrison duty. There he made a collection of ferns, which he presented to the Royal Gardens, Kew.

== Later life ==
Oliver resigned his commission in 1878. For a time he acted as correspondent of The Illustrated London News in Cyprus and Syria. In poor health from malaria, he settled to writing, at Gosport and then at Worthing.

He was elected Fellow of the Royal Geographical Society in 1866, became Fellow of the Ethnological Society in 1869, and Fellow of the Society of Antiquaries in 1874. He died at Worthing on 31 July 1907, and was buried at Findon.

== Works ==
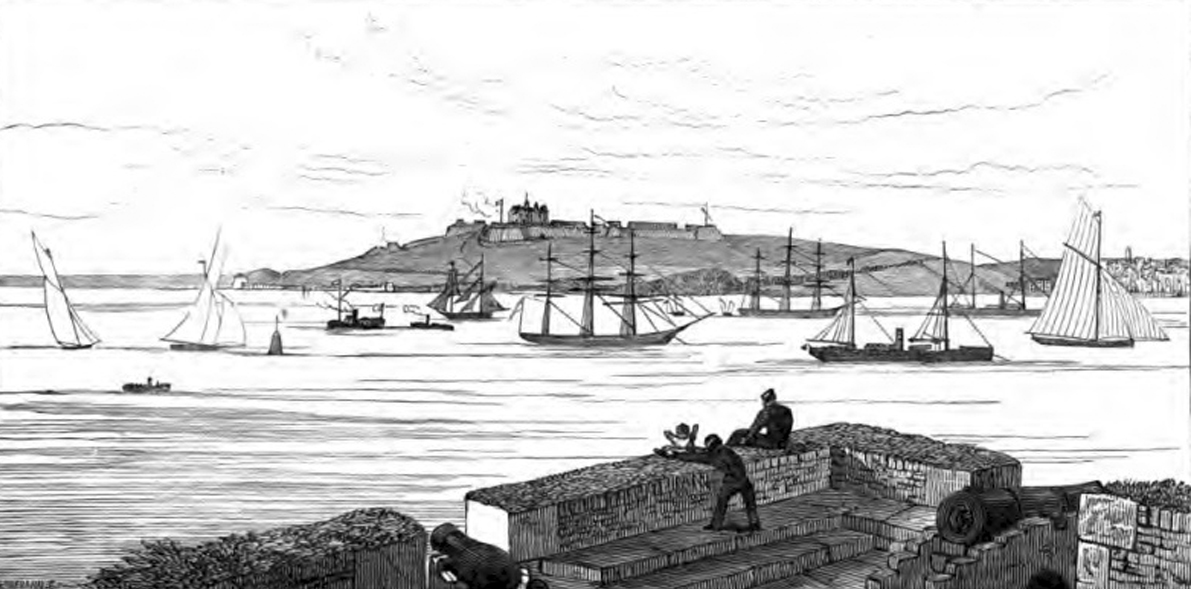
Oliver's sketch of the view from St Mawes Castle in 1875

At a meeting of the British Association at Dundee on 5 September 1867 Oliver read a paper on ‘Two Routes through Nicaragua.' His diary of his journey, ‘Rambles of a Gunner through Nicaragua' (privately printed, 1879), was subsequently embodied in a larger volume of reminiscences, entitled ‘On and Off Duty' (1881).

His volumes descriptive of Malagasy life became the standard English authority on the subject. In 1866 he published ‘Madagascar and the Malagasy,' a diary of his first visit to the island, which he illustrated with some spirited sketches. This was followed by an ethnological study in French, ‘Les Hovas et les autres tribus caractéristiques de Madagascar' (Guernsey, 1869). In ‘The True Story of the French Dispute in Madagascar' (1885) Oliver criticised the treatment of the Malagasy by the French colonial officials. Finally his two volumes on ‘Madagascar' (1886), based on many sources, gave a detailed account of the island, its history, and its inhabitants. A drawing by Oliver of a stream of lava tumbling over a cliff was reproduced in John Wesley Judd's ‘Volcanoes, what they are and what they teach' (1881).

From Guernsey, where he was appointed adjutant in 1868, he visited Brittany, and drew up a report on the prehistoric remains at Carnac and other sites (Proc. Ethnological Soc. 1871). In 1872 a tour in the Mediterranean resulted in archæological observations in Asia Minor, Greece, and Sardinia, published as ‘Nuragghi Sardi, and other Non-Historic Stone Structures of the Mediterranean' (Dublin, 1875). He wrote on the history of two Cornish castles, ‘Pendennis and St. Mawes' (Truro, 1875).

Oliver also edited:

- ‘Madagascar, or Robert Drury's Journal,' 1890.
- ‘The Voyage of François Leguat,' 1891 (Hakluyt Society).
- ‘The Memoirs and Travels of Mauritius Augustus Count de Benyowsky,' 1893.
- ‘The Voyages made by the Sieur Dubois,' 1897 (translation).

In addition to these works he assisted in the preparation of ‘The Life of Sir Charles MacGregor,' published by his wife in 1888, and from the notes and documents collected by Sir Charles MacGregor he compiled the abridged official account of ‘The Second Afghan War, 1878–80' (posthumous, 1908). ‘The Life of Philibert Commerson,' which appeared posthumously in 1909, was edited with a short memoir of Oliver by G. F. Scott Elliot. To the Dictionary of National Biography he contributed the articles on François Leguat and Sir Charles MacGregor.

== Family ==
He married on 10 September 1863 at Port Louis, Mauritius, Clara Georgina, second daughter of Frederic Mylius Dick, and they had five sons and four daughters. Their third daughter, Ellen Frederica Oliver, was jailed as a suffragette and later became a key member of the Southcottian religious movement led by Mabel Barltrop.
