= George Lance =

English painter

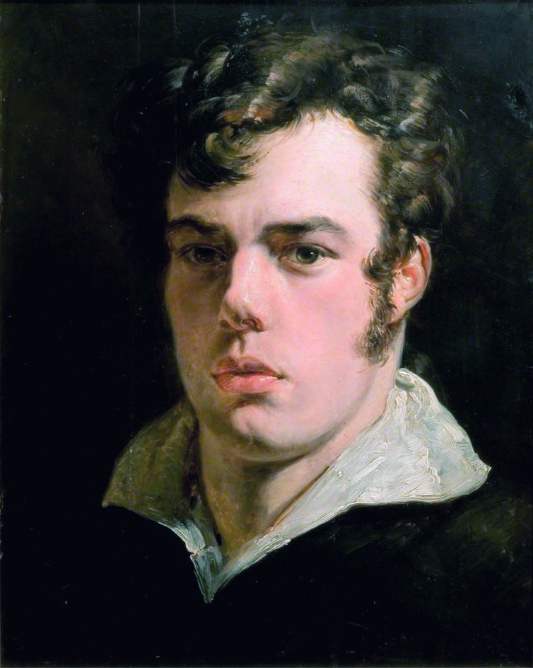
Self portrait (c. 1830)

George Lance (24 March 1802 – 18 June 1864) was an English painter of still life and portrait miniatures.

== Early life and education ==
Lance was born at the old manor-house in Little Easton in Essex. His father was William Lance who had previously served in a regiment of light horse and was at the time of Lance's birth an adjutant in the Essex yeomanry; he later became the inspector of the Bow Street horse-patrol. His mother, Louisa Lucy (née) Constable, with whom his father had eloped from boarding-school, was the daughter of Colonel Constable of Beverley in Yorkshire.

Although Lance showed a predilection for art at a very early age, he was placed, while not yet fourteen, in a factory in Leeds. However, the work injured his health and he returned to London. Wandering one day into the British Museum, he casually started a conversation with Charles Landseer, who happened to be drawing there. On learning that Landseer was a pupil of Benjamin Haydon, he went early next morning to that painter's residence, and asked to become a pupil. Haydon replied that if his drawings promised future success he would instruct him for nothing. Not many days later Lance, still not yet fourteen, entered Haydon's studio, and remained there for seven years, at the same time studying in the schools of the Royal Academy.

== Career ==
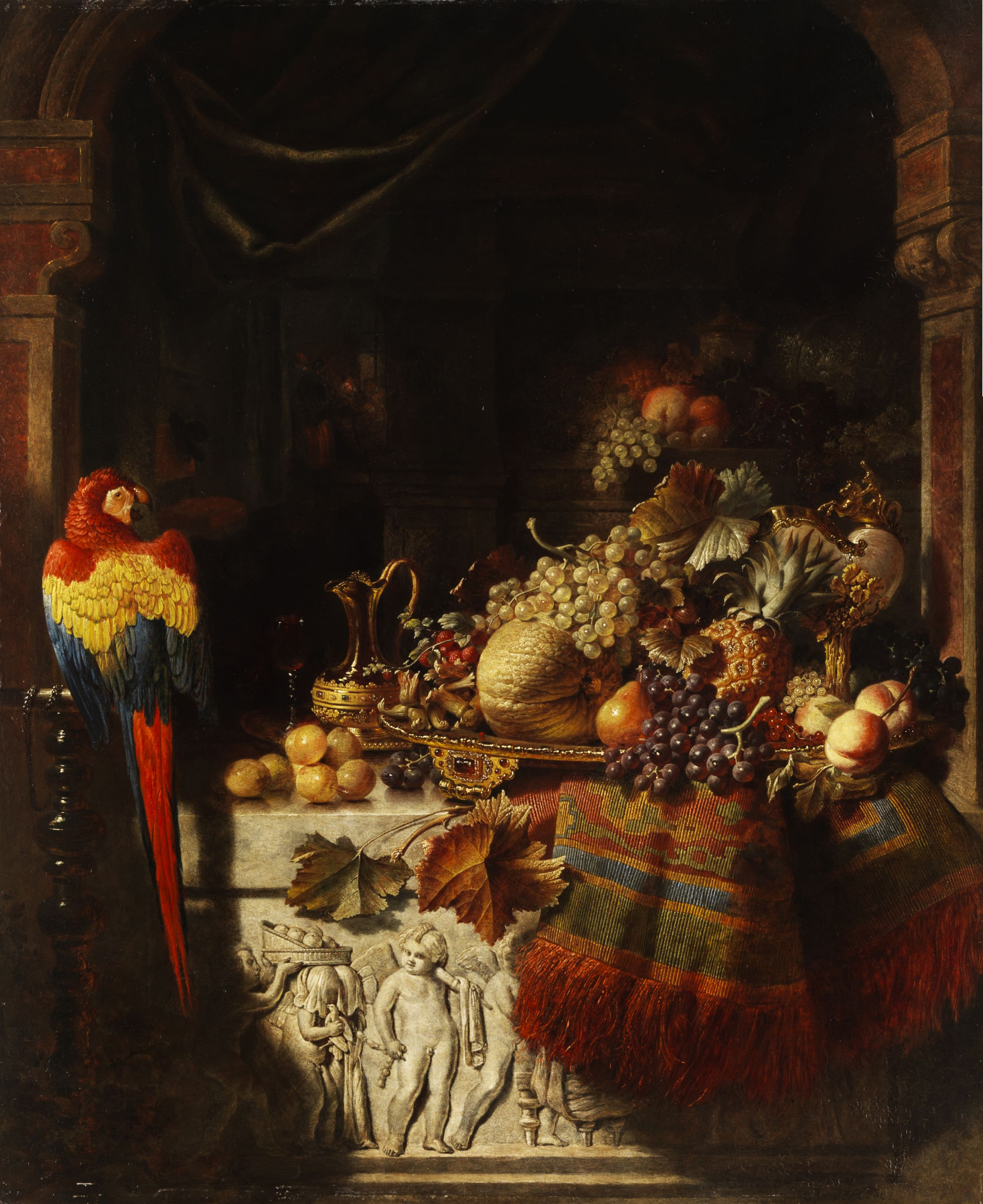
Still life with fruits and parrot

While designing a picture inspired by Homer's Iliad, he decided, before putting on the colours, to paint some fruit and vegetables as practice. This work attracted the notice of Sir George Beaumont, who purchased it, and this success led him to paint another fruit-piece, which he sold to the Earl of Shaftesbury. He then painted two fruit-pieces for the Duke of Bedford as decorations for a summer-house at Woburn Abbey, and his work proved so profitable that he decided to devote himself to still-life painting.

He began to exhibit in 1824, when he sent to the British Institution A Fruit Boy, and to the Society of British Artists The Mischievous Boy and two fruit-pieces. In 1828 he exhibited the Royal Academy, for the first time. showing a still-life with an appended quotation from Samuel Butler's "Hudibras":

"Goose, rabbit, pheasant, pigeons, all
With good brown jug for beer not small!"

His drawing Portrait of Emily Augusta Patmore (c.1834) is now in the collection of the British Museum. Although he gained his reputation chiefly as a painter of fruit and flowers, Lance sometimes produced historical and genre works, and his picture of Melanchthon's First Misgivings of the Church of Rome won the prize at the Liverpool Academy in 1836. His works appeared most frequently at the exhibitions of the British Institution, to which he contributed 135 pictures, and he also sent 48 works to the Society of British Artists, and 38 to the Royal Academy. They included:

- The Wine Cooler (1831)
- The Brothers (1837)
- Captain Rolando showing to Gil Blas the Treasures of the Cave' (1839)
- May I have this? (1840)
- The Ballad' and 'Narcissus (1841)
- The Microscope (1842)
- The Village Coquette (1843)
- The Grandmother's Blessing (1844)
- The Biron Conspiracy (1845)
- Preparations for a Banquet (1846)
- From the Garden, just gathered and From the Lake, just shot and Red Cap, a monkey with a red cap on his head (1847)
- Modern Fruit Medieval Art (1850)
- The Blonde and The Brunette (1851)
- The Seneschal (painted for Sir Morton Peto, 1852)
- Harold (1855)
- Fair and Fruitful Italy and Beautiful in Death, a peacock (1857)
- The Peacock at Home (1858)
- The Golden Age (1859)
- A Sunny Bank (1861)
- A Gleam of Sunshine and The Burgomaster's Dessert (1862).

He also exhibited many fruit-pieces and pictures of dead game, painted with great richness of colour and truthfulness to nature. Lance died at the residence of his son - Sunnyside, near Birkenhead - on 18 June 1864.

His most distinguished pupils were Sir John Gilbert and William Duffield, the latter an artist of great promise who died young in 1863.
