= Sieur Dubois =

17th-century French traveller

Sieur Dubois ([sjœʁ dy.bwa]) or Sieur D. B. was a French traveller who reached the islands of Madagascar and Réunion at the time of early colonization by France. He wrote a book in French, published in 1674, about his journeys and the wildlife he saw including details of several species of birds endemic to Réunion that have since become extinct, such as the Réunion ibis, Réunion swamphen, and Réunion rail. Captain Samuel Pasfield Oliver translated and edited the original French version into an English version, which was published in 1897.

== Cited texts ==
- Dubois, Sieur (1674). Les voyages faits par le sieur D. B. aux Isles Dauphine ou Madagascar, et Bourbon, ou Mascarenne, és années 1669, 70, 71 et 72. Dans laquelle il est curieusement traité du Cap Vert, de la ville de Surate, des isles de Sainte Helene, ou de l´Ascention. Ensemble les moeurs, religions, forces, gouvernemens et coutumes des habitans des dites isles, avec l´histoire naturelle du pais (in French). Paris: Chez Claude Barbin.
- Dubois, Sieur (1897). Oliver, Samuel Pasfield (ed.). "The voyages made by the sieur D.B. to the islands Dauphine or Madagascar & Bourbon or Mascarenne in the years 1669. 70. 71 & 72". London: Printed for D. Nutt by T. and A. Constable.
