= Alice Seymour =

British head teacher, writer, expositor and publisher (1857-1947)

- Born: 10 January 1857; Plymouth, Devon, UKGBI
- Died: 24 October 1947 (aged 90); Blockley, Gloucestershire, UK
- Occupations: Head teacher; writer; expositor; publisher
- Writing career
- Pen name: Alec C. More

Alice Seymour (10 January 1857 – 24 October 1947) was a British head teacher, writer, expositor and publisher of the writings of Joanna Southcott. In 1928, Seymour founded the Olive Branch League for young Southcottians.

== Early life ==
Seymour was born in Plymouth. Her parents were members of the Christian Israelite Church who followed the evangelist John Wroe. She read the works of Joanna Southcott as a child.

== Spiritual intervention ==
In 1907 she said she was visited by spirits who told her that she was to write a life of Joanna Southcott. She did this and it was published in 1909, "The Express". She had previously thought that she was to write a Southcott biography book with the Reverend Walter Begley, but he had died in 1905. The 1909 book was well received at the Daily News, which made it their book of the week.

In 1914, she led a campaign to get the secret prophecies of Joanna Southcott opened. The prophecies were intended for a moment of crisis and Southcott had laid down the conditions under which they could be opened including the presence of 24 bishops.

Seymour created a group who followed the ideas of Southcott and she was in disagreement with Mabel Barltrop and the Panacea Society. Seymour arranged for the publication of Southcott's works and a magazine, but it was Barltrop who was to lead the larger Southcottian group. Seymour objected to Barltrop but they never fell out as Seymour wanted to be there when Barltop's group organised a reopening of Southcott's box. In Mabel Barltrop's 1930s planning for the potential opening of the box a seat was set aside for Seymour. One of Seymour's followers, Ellen Oliver, was to join Barltrop's emerging group and to identify Barltrop as a prophet.

== Death ==
Seymour died in Blockley in 1947 at Rock Cottage.
