= Emily Augusta Patmore =

British writer (1824–1862), first wife of Coventry Patmore

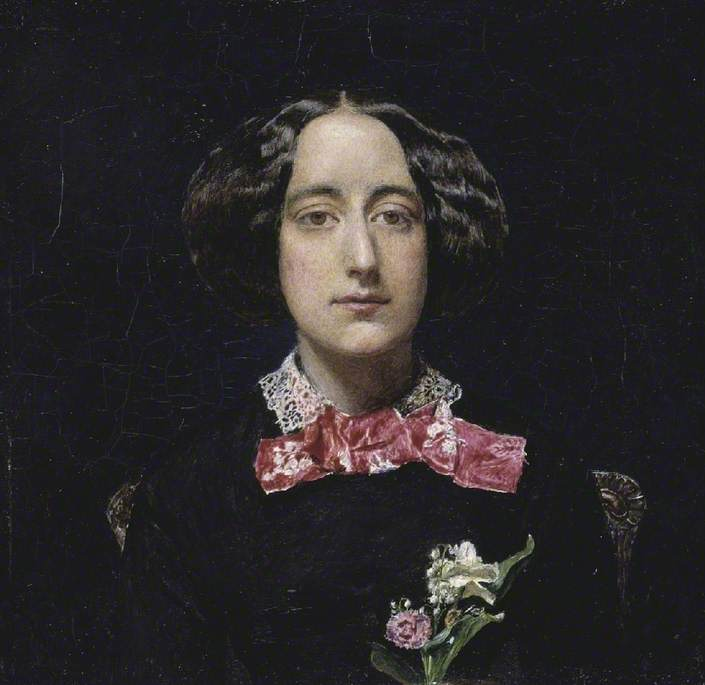
- Mrs Coventry Patmore by John Everett Millais, 1851, Fitzwilliam Museum, Cambridge
- Born: Emily Augusta Andrews; 29 February 1824; Walworth, London, England
- Died: 5 July 1862 (aged 38); Hampstead, London, England
- Other name: Mrs Motherly
- Occupation: Writer
- Spouse: Coventry Patmore (1847–1862; her death)
- Children: 6

Emily Augusta Patmore (née Andrews; 29 February 1824 – 5 July 1862) was a British author, a model for members of the Pre-Raphaelite movement, and the inspiration for Coventry Patmore's 1854–1862 narrative poem The Angel in the House.

== Early life and education ==
Emily Augusta Andrews was born on 29 February 1824, the daughter of Elizabeth Honor (née Symons) (1792–1831) and Edward Andrews (1787–1841), a Congregational minister at Beresford Chapel, Walworth, London. She was one of 12 siblings, an elder brother Edward William Andrews (1812–1877), later emigrated to Australia and became a newspaper proprietor and editor, and four elder sisters included Eliza, later Orme (1816-1892), whose daughters grew up to be women's rights activists Emily Rosaline Orme, a leading Edinburgh suffragist, and Eliza Orme, the first woman to earn a law degree in England. Her younger brother Augustus Charles Andrews became a bank clerk and his daughter Mabel Barltrop became a religious leader and prophet.

Their mother died in April 1831 when Emily was still young and she took over the household duties for her father. It is thought that she learned Greek, Latin, and French under his tutelage. Her father was also a Latin, Greek and Hebrew tutor to John Ruskin, whom Emily and Eliza were later credited with introducing to the Pre-Raphaelite Brotherhood. As a child, Emily's portrait was drawn by George Lance around 1834. Now known as Emily Augusta Patmore at 10 years of age, the drawing is in the collection of the British Museum, but not currently on display. It shows her head and shoulders, looking slightly up and smiling.

== Marriage and The Angel in the House ==
Emily Augusta Andrews met the poet and critic Coventry Patmore while living at her sister Eliza Orme's house following the 1841 death of their father, which had left the family destitute. Eliza had married Charles Orme, heir to a brewing fortune, and the couple's home in Regent's Park in London was a noted gathering place for the Pre-Raphaelite movement.

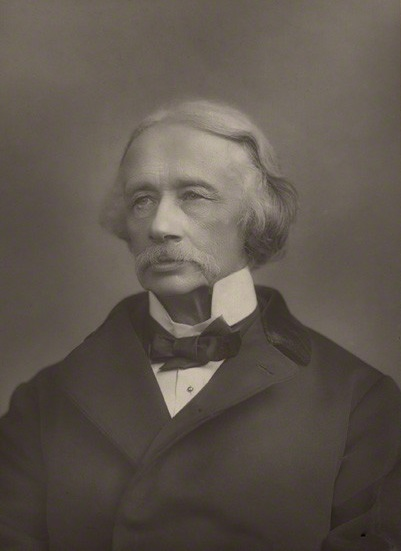
Coventry Patmore

Patmore worked at the British Museum as a librarian and mixed in literary and artistic circles including the Pre Raphaelites. Emily Augusta Andrews and Coventry Patmore married on 11 September 1847.

Over the period of their marriage, Patmore wrote the four elements that eventually became the poem The Angel in the House.

Emily was staunchly Protestant, following in the footsteps of her father and grandfather, who had been Congregationlist Ministers. Patmore was far more high church in his religious leanings and it is thought that he remained a practising Anglican during Emily's lifetime out of respect for her wishes.

The Patmores had six children – Coventry (b. 1848), Tennyson (b. 1850), Emily Honoria (1853–1882), Bertha (b. 1855), Gertrude (b. 1857) and Henry John (b. 1860). The couple introduced her niece, suffrage campaigner Emily Rosaline Orme (1835–1915) to her future husband David Masson via gatherings at the home of Emily's sister Eliza Orme.

== Pre-Raphaelites ==
Emily Patmore's education, intelligence and beauty made her both a model for and a respected contributor within the Pre-Raphaelite friendship group. She was portrayed on a medallion by Thomas Woolner, and was the subject of a painting by John Everett Millais entitled Mrs. Coventry Patmore in 1851, now in the collection of the Fitzwilliam Museum in Cambridge. John Brett's portrait of Mrs Patmore was exhibited at the Royal Academy in 1856 and is now held at the Ashmolean Museum in Oxford. She was also the inspiration for "A Face", a poem by Robert Browning.

== Writing career ==
Emily Patmore published three books under the pseudonym of Mrs Motherly.

In 1859, she published The Servant's Behaviour Book, or, Hints on Manners and Dress for Maid Servants in Small Households, a conduct book for women in domestic service, written in a clear, practical manner.

Her two other publications were of a more literary bent. Nursery Poetry (1859) features lively verses on household matters, while Nursery Tales (1860) is improving and moralistic in tone. She is also considered to have had a significant role in the creation of The Children's Garland (1862), her husband's anthology of poems.

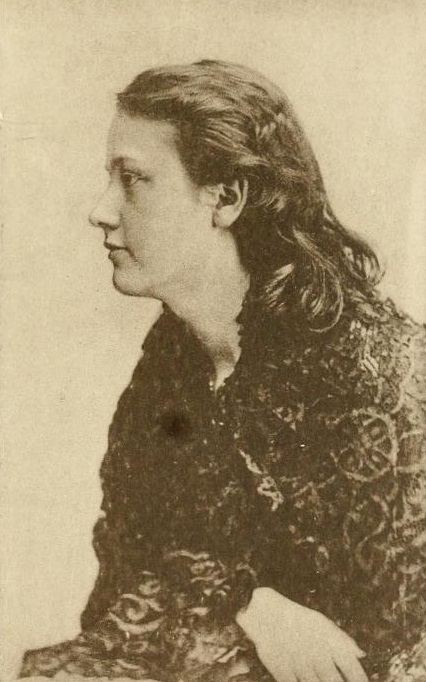
Emily Honoria Patmore, Patmore's daughter, in 1872

== Death ==
Emily Patmore died of tuberculosis on 5 July 1862 at home at Elm Cottage, North End, Hampstead, London. She was thirty-eight years old, and left a young family of six children.

Her husband converted to Catholicism following her death and their daughter Emily Honoria became a nun.

== Publications ==
- The Servant's Behaviour Book, or, Hints on Manners and Dress for Maid Servants in Small Households. (1859)
- Nursery Poetry (1859)
- Nursery Tales (1860)
