= John Gilbert (painter) =

English painter

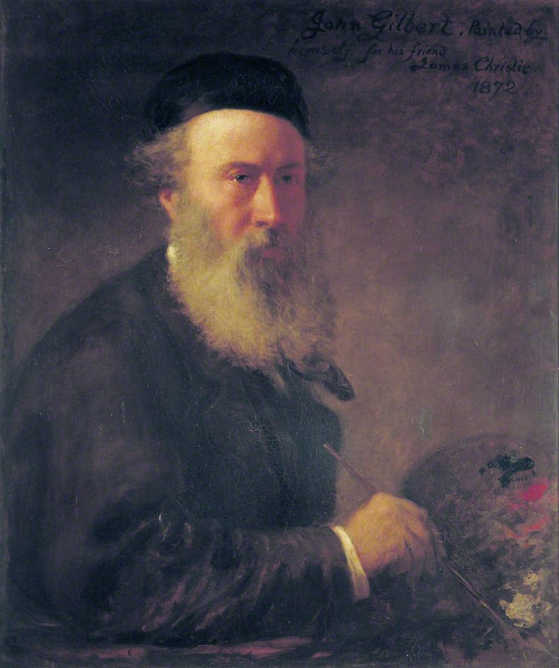
Self-portrait, 1872.

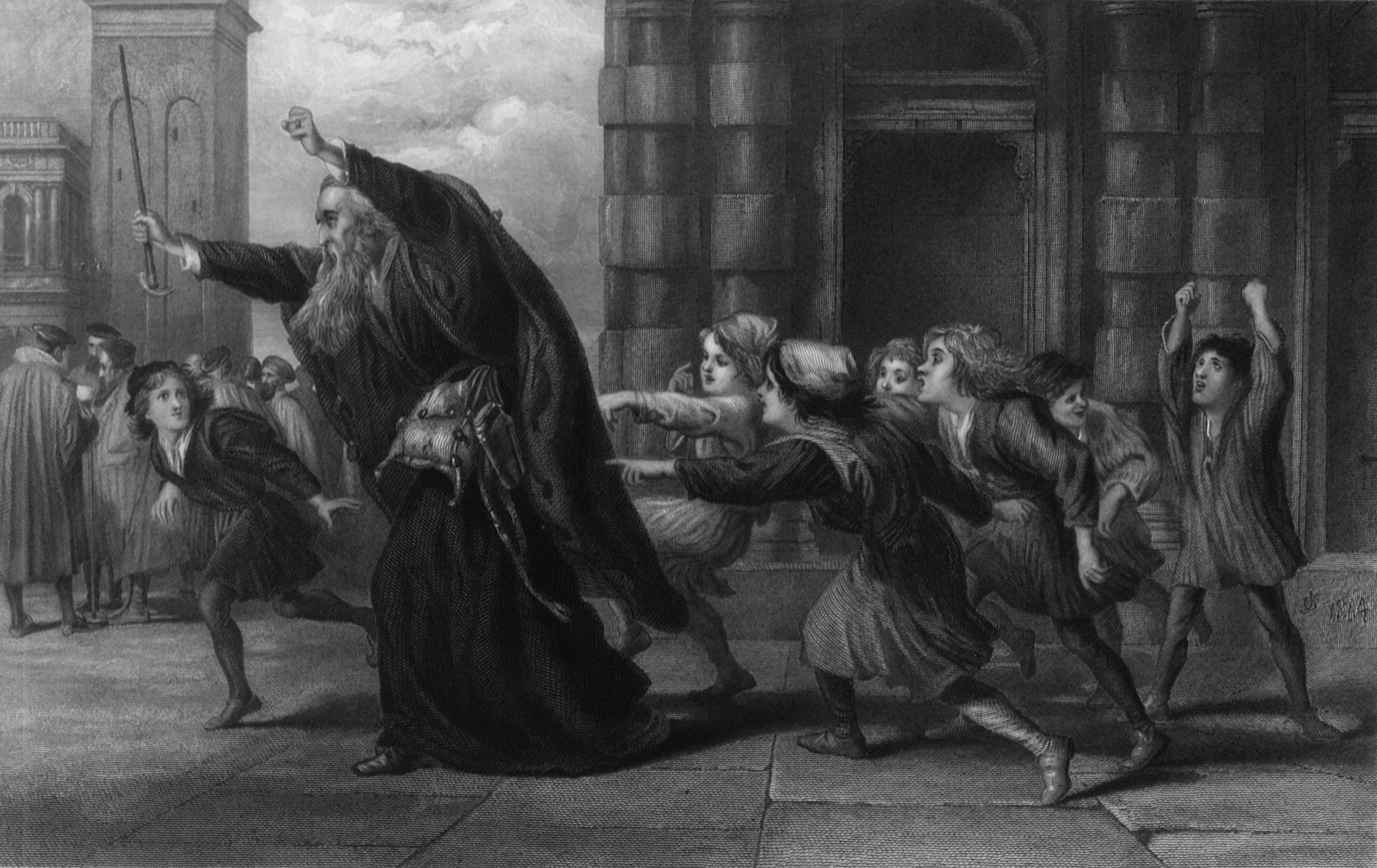
Gilbert's Shylock After the Trial, an illustration to The Merchant of Venice.

Sir John Gilbert (21 July 1817 – 5 October 1897) was an English artist, illustrator and engraver.

== Biography ==
Gilbert was born in Blackheath, Surrey, and taught himself to paint. His only formal instruction was from George Lance. Skilled in several media, Gilbert gained the nickname, "the Walter Scott of painting", after the famed Scottish novelist, poet and historian, because both shared a passion for past eras and battle scenes . He was best known for the illustrations and wood-engravings he produced for the Illustrated London News.

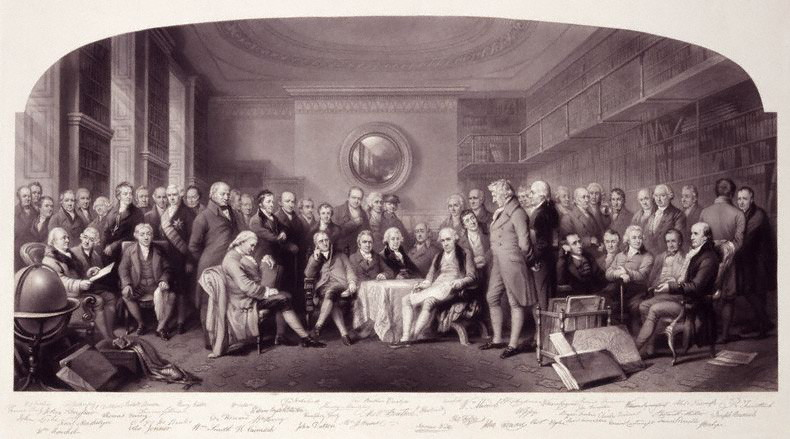
Distinguished Men of Science. Use the cursor to see who is who.

Gilbert was initially apprenticed to a firm of estate agents, but taught himself art by copying prints. He was unable to enter the Royal Academy Schools, but mastered watercolour, oils, and other media. From 1836 he exhibited at the Society of British Artists, and at the RA from 1838. The art patron Thomas Sheepshanks and the artist William Mulready suggested that he learn wood engraving. Starting with Punch, he moved on to the Illustrated London News. He designed an impressive number of wood-engravings (over 2000) for that publication and for The London Journal. He also produced very many illustrations for books, including nearly all the important English poets. He became president of the Royal Watercolour Society in 1871. He exhibited some 400 pictures in watercolour and oil exhibited at the various societies. In 1872 he was knighted. He became an RA in 1876, in the same year as Edward John Poynter.

The Gilbert-Garret Competition for Sketching Clubs was started in 1870 at St. Martins School of Art, and named after its first president, John Gilbert. In 1893 he presented a collection of his work to the Guildhall Art Gallery in the City of London.

Gilbert is buried at Brockley and Ladywell Cemeteries.

== Illustrated books and legacy ==
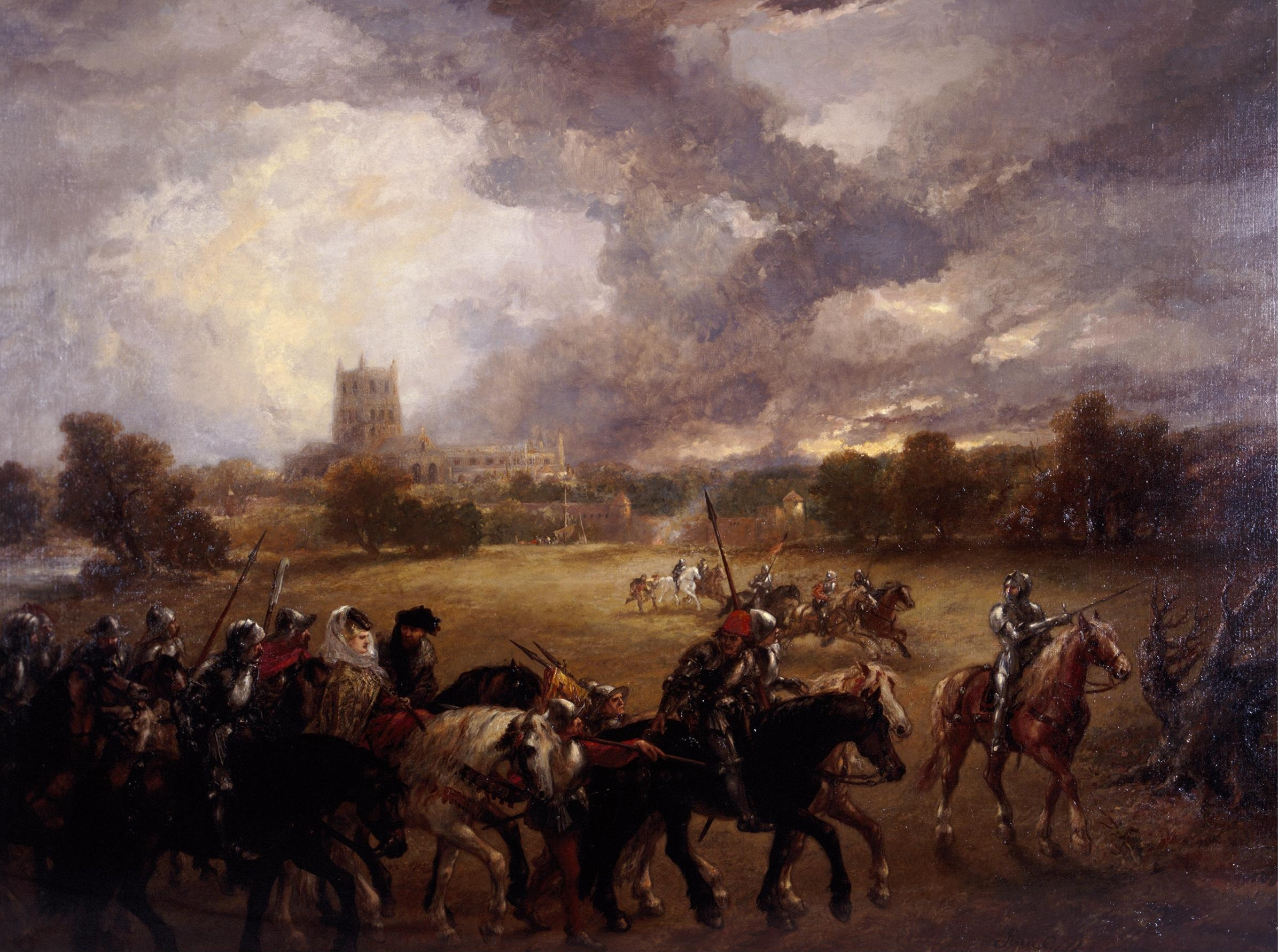
Margaret of Anjou Taken Prisoner After the Battle of Tewkesbury, 1875

Gilbert illustrated:

- William Shakespeare. Song and sonnets (London: S. Low, Marston, Searle, & Rivington, 1862).
- Tales from Shakspere. Charles Lamb (London: Richard Clay & Sons, Bread Street Hill, 1866)
- The Works of William Shakespeare (in 3 volumes). Edited by Howard Staunton – with 829 illustrations by John Gilbert (London: George Routledge and sons, 1866)
- The Works of William Shakspere. Edited by Charles Knight – with nearly 400 illustrations by Sir John Gilbert A.R.A (Boston: Estes and Lauriat, 1878)
- The Gilbert Shakespeare: The Works of Shakespeare. Edited by Howard Staunton – with over 511 illustrations by Sir John Gilbert R.A. (London: George Routledge and Sons, undated, but likely circa 1895).

Gilbert has nearly sixty oil paintings in British national collections.

His noted painting "The Plays of William Shakespeare, ca. 1849" oil on canvas depicted scenes from all of Shakespeare's plays.
