= Mabel Barltrop =

English founder of the Panacea Society

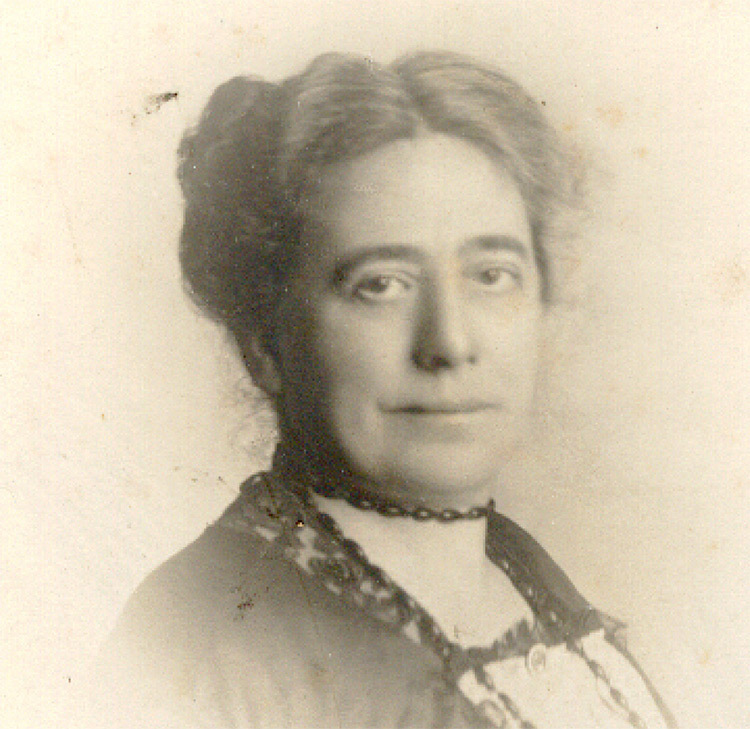
- Barltrop, c. 1925
- Born: Mabel Andrews; 11 January 1866; Peckham, London, United Kingdom
- Died: 16 October 1934 (aged 68); Bedford, Bedfordshire, United Kingdom
- Other name: Octavia
- Known for: Founder of religious movement and prophet
- Spouse: Arthur Henry Barltrop

Mabel Barltrop (née Andrews; 11 January 1866 – 16 October 1934), later known as Octavia Barltrop, was the British founder of the Panacea Society. She founded a community in Bedford, and declared herself to be "God the daughter".

== Life ==
Barltrop was born in Peckham, London, to Augustus and Katherine Andrews (née Buxton). One of her godparents was the poet Coventry Patmore, who married her father's sister Emily. In 1875 her father died; Barltrop and her invalid mother moved to Croydon to live with Mabel's widowed aunt, Fanny Waldron. Her mother was high church, her aunt was low church and her father's father had been a Congregational minister.

When she was eighteen she began a long engagement with Arthur Henry Barltrop, who was training to be a Church of England clergyman at a training college in Chichester. Arthur Barltrop completed theological college in 1888; he took up a position as a curate in Dover the following year, and the couple married in London on 1 June 1889. They had four children between 1890 and 1898. Arthur continued to work as a curate until 1902, in Maidstone and then Croydon; he never became a vicar. In 1902, he became ill and the family later went to live in Bedford. He died in 1906 and Barltrop was treated residentially for melancholia. She took work as an editor and her aunt, Fanny Barltrop, joined her household.

Barltrop heard of Joanna Southcott via a leaflet written by Alice Seymour. She was inspired by the teachings of the Devonshire prophetess, who had died aged 64 claiming to be pregnant with a messiah. Seymour arranged for the publication of Southcott's works and a magazine, but it was Barltrop who was to lead the larger Southcottian group. Seymour objected to Barltrop, but they never fell out as Seymour wanted to be present when Barltrop's group organised a reopening of Southcott's box. One of Seymour's followers, Ellen Oliver, joined Barltrop's emerging group.

== The daughter of God ==
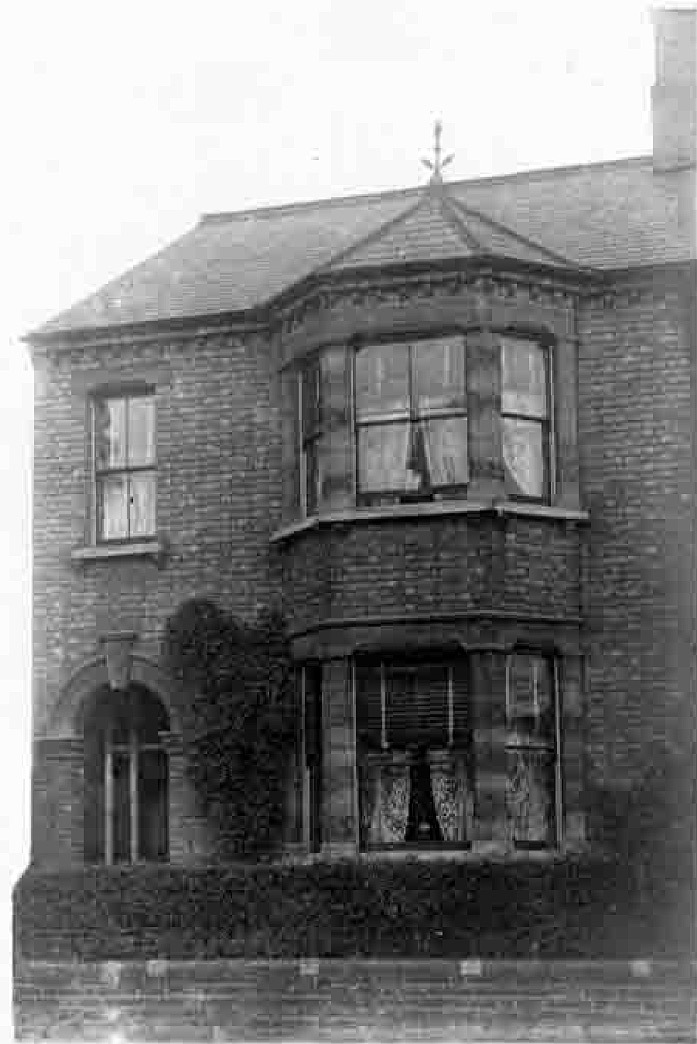
12 Albany Road was the home of the Panacea Society in the 1920s and which they believed to be the site of the Garden of Eden

Barltrop and twelve apostles founded the Society which they called the Community of the Holy Ghost. It was founded in 1919 at 12 Albany Road, Bedford, and it was believed to be the site of the Garden of Eden. Barltrop declared herself the "daughter of God", took the name "Octavia" and believed herself to be the Shiloh mentioned in Southcott's prophecies. This was not her original idea as it was suggested by Ellen Oliver on 14 February 1919 and supported by Rachel Fox who decided that Barltrop was the eighth Southcottian prophet and should therefore be called "Octavia". The Christian Trinity was rethought to include, God the Father, God the Mother (the Holy Spirit), Jesus the Son, and Octavia the Daughter. Once identified, she appeared to be born to it and she would set aside a time every day, 5:30, to use automatic writing to create a daily "Writing of the Holy Ghost". These writings were typed and discussed. When published as "The Writings of the Holy Ghost" these messages ran to sixteen volumes.

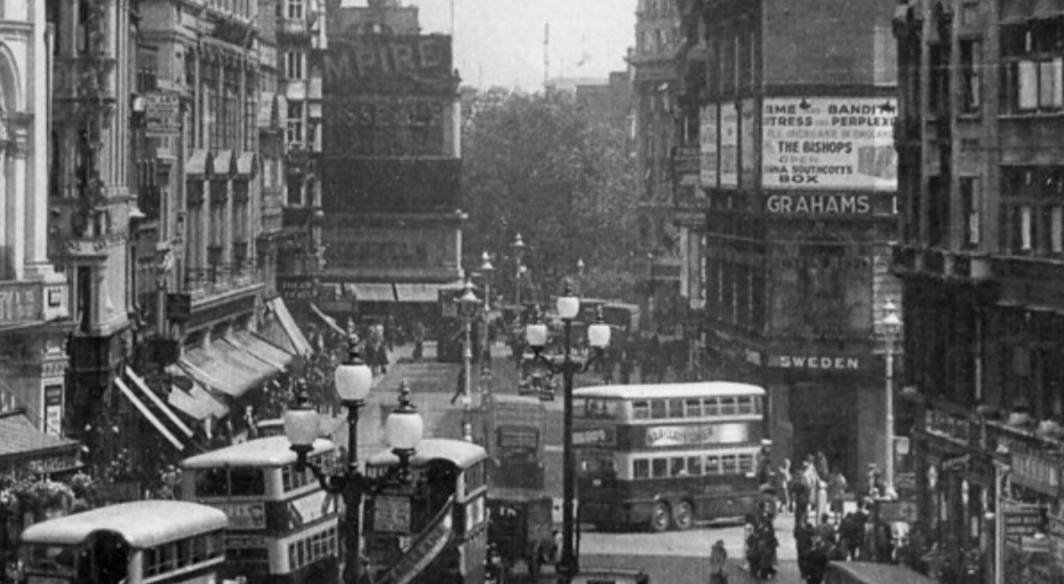
1932 "Crime and Banditry, Distress and Perplexity will increase in England until the Bishops Open Joanna Southcott's Box". A poster placed in Piccadilly Circus by the Panacea Society in June and July 1932

The Society campaigned to persuade 24 Anglican bishops to open a sealed box of prophecies that had been left with instructions by Joanna Southcott. Advertisements were placed in newspapers and in the late 1920s and early 1930s, the Society generated over 100,000 petitions for the box to be opened.

In 1921 Emily Goodwin joined Barltrop's household to look after her aged aunt Fanny. Emily also joined the Panacea community. In 1923 it was discovered that one of the community's members was leading a group of gay males and that he was trying to join the community's leadership. They ejected Edgar Peissart from the community and he returned to America, where Emily Goodwin predicted he would die. When they heard that he had died the same year, Emily's position was elevated and she declared herself "The Divine Mother".

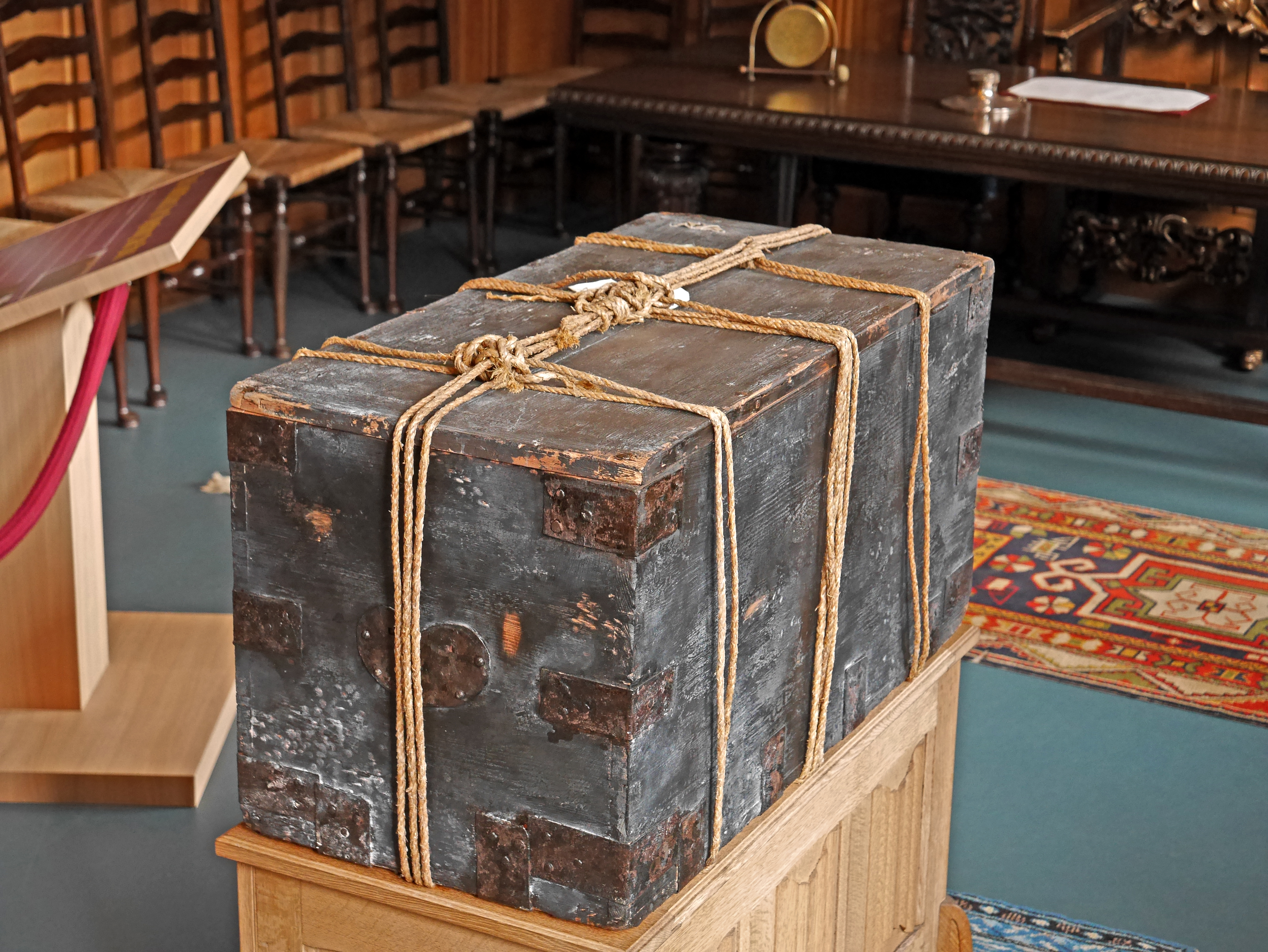
Joanna Southcott's Box is today in The Panacea Museum in Bedford

The society was anticipating the second coming of Christ, but in 1923 Barltrop decided that her late husband had been Jesus and they were therefore waiting for the third coming of Christ.

Barltrop died in Bedford of diabetes, but her followers were in denial for three days. They kept her body warm expecting her to resurrect. Her body was only confined to a coffin when this failed to happen. She was buried in Bedford with her name recorded as "M.B." and with the message "I am the Resurrection and the Life". She is buried in the Foster Hill Road Cemetery together with over a hundred of her supporters.

== Legacy ==
After her death, the movement continued to thrive. In 2011, Jane Shaw published Octavia, Daughter of God: The Story of a Female Messiah and her Followers which described her life and work. The book was criticised by Frances Stonor Saunders for not exposing Barltrop's delusions. Shaw was at the time a trustee of the Panacea charity. The last member of the Panacea community died in 2012. In 2019 the resulting charity was worth £34m. A play was performed in Bedford based on Panacea and her life in 2019. The local museum had a gallery for famous people from Bedford and the women included suffragist Amy Walmsley, Barltrop and deaconess Fanny Eagles.
