= Joanna Southcott =

Self-described religious prophetess, 1750–1814

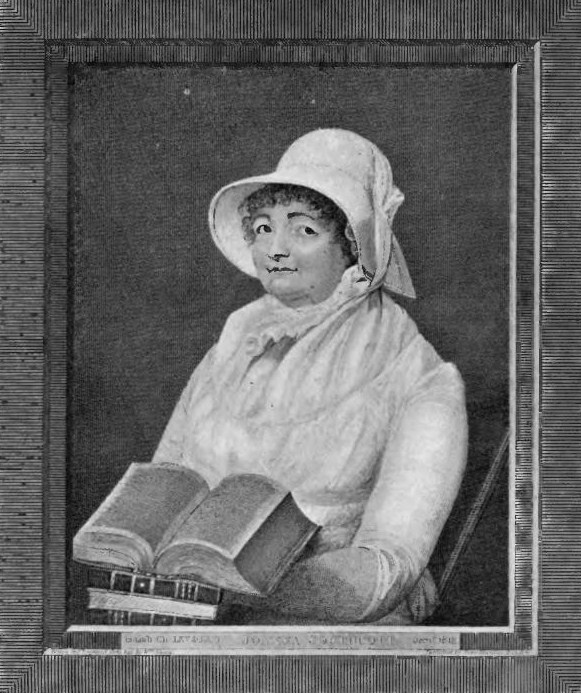
- Portrait drawn and engraved by William Sharp, 1812.
- Born: April 1750; Taleford, Devon, England
- Died: 26 December 1814 (aged 64); London, England
- Occupation: Religious prophet

Joanna Southcott (or Southcote; April 1750 – 26 December 1814) was a British self-described religious prophetess from Devon. She claimed to be pregnant with the new messiah, Shiloh, but died of an illness which made her look pregnant. A "Southcottian" movement continued in various forms after her death. She left a sealed box of prophecies to be opened in a time of national crisis.

== Early life ==
Joanna Southcott was born in the hamlet of Taleford, Devonshire, baptised at Ottery St Mary, and grew up in the village of Gittisham. Her father, William Southcott (died 1802), ran a small farm. She did dairy work as a girl, and after the death of her mother, Hannah, she went into service, first as a shop-girl in Honiton, then for a considerable time as a domestic servant in Exeter. She was eventually dismissed because a footman whose attentions she rejected claimed that she was "growing mad".

== Self-revelation ==
She may have always been in or after belonging to the Church of England joined the Wesleyan Methodist Church in Exeter in about 1792. She became persuaded that she had supernatural gifts and wrote and dictated prophecies in rhyme. She then announced herself as the Woman of the Apocalypse, as described in the Book of Revelation 12:1–6.

Southcott came to London at the request of William Sharp, an engraver, and began selling paper "seals of the Lord" at prices varying from twelve shillings to a guinea. The seals were supposed to ensure a holder's place among the 144,000 people ostensibly elected to eternal life.

== The new Messiah and death ==
At the age of 64, Southcott claimed she was pregnant with the new Messiah, the Shiloh of Genesis (49:10). 19 October 1814 was the planned delivery date, but Shiloh failed to appear, and it was given out that she was in a trance. Southcott had a disorder that made her appear pregnant and this fuelled her followers, who numbered about 100,000 by 1814, mainly in the London area.

Southcott died not long after this. Her official date of death was given as 27 December 1814, but it is likely that she died the previous day, as her followers retained her body for some time in the belief that she would be raised from the dead. They agreed to her burial only after the corpse began to decay. She was buried at the Chapel of Ease at St John's Wood in January 1815.

== Legacy ==
=== Followers ===
The "Southcottian" movement did not end with her death in 1814, although her followers had declined greatly in number by the end of that century. In 1844 one Ann Essam left large sums of money for "printing, publishing and propagation of the sacred writings of Joanna Southcott". The will was disputed in 1861 by her niece on grounds that the writings were blasphemous and the bequest was contrary to the Statutes of Mortmain: the Court of Chancery refused to find the writings blasphemous but voided the bequest, acknowledging that it broke the Statutes of Mortmain.

In 1881 there was an enclave of her followers living in the Chatham area, east of London, who were distinguished by their long beards and good manners.

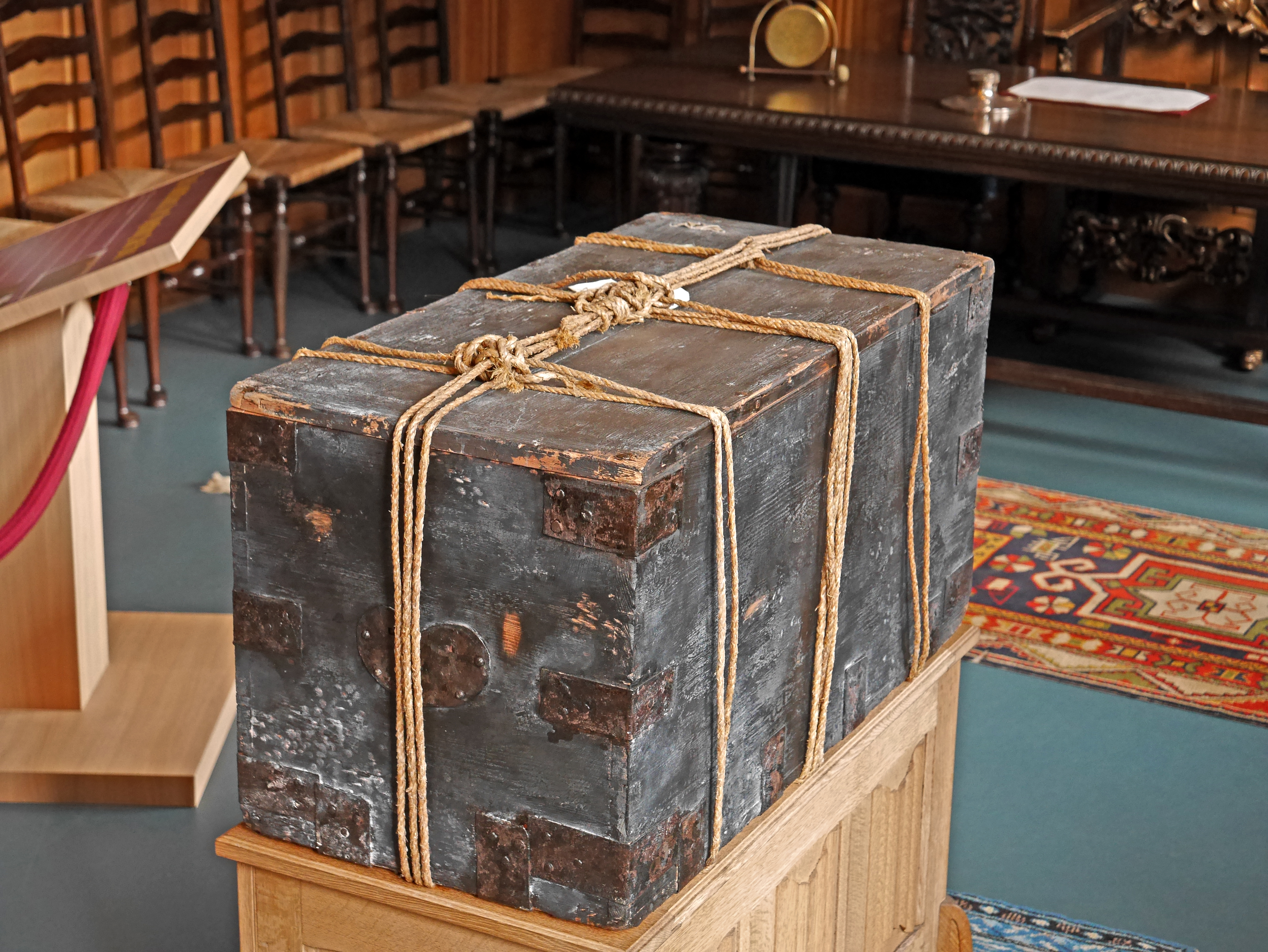
Reproduction of Joanna Southcott's Box in The Panacea Museum in Bedford

Her religious teaching is still practised today by two groups: the Christian Israelite Church and the House of David.

=== Joanna Southcott's Box ===
Southcott left a sealed wooden casket of prophecies, usually known as Joanna Southcott's Box, with instructions to open it only at a time of national crisis and in the presence of all 24 current bishops of the Church of England, who were to spend a fixed period beforehand studying her prophecies. (Since 1870, the number of bishops has increased beyond the 24 Lords Spiritual, by the creation of new dioceses and the reintroduction of suffragan bishops.) Attempts were made to persuade the episcopate to open it in the Crimean War and again in the First World War. In 1927, the psychic researcher Harry Price claimed to have come into possession of the box and arranged to have it opened in the presence of one reluctant prelate, John Hine, then suffragan Bishop of Grantham. It was found to contain only a few oddments and unimportant papers, among them a lottery ticket and a horse-pistol. Price's claims to have had the true box were disputed by historians and by Southcott followers.

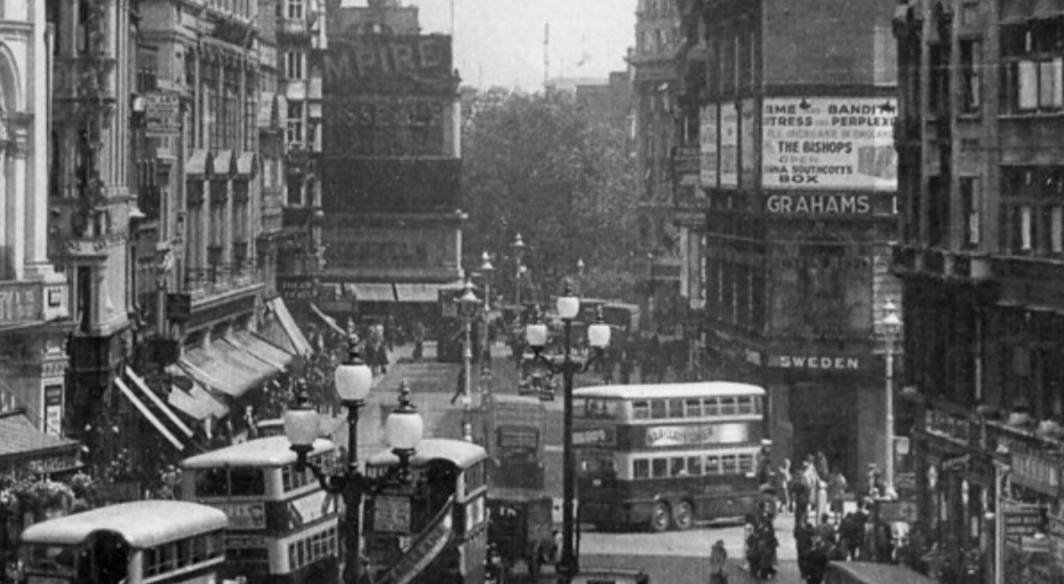
1932 "Crime and Banditry, Distress and Perplexity will increase in England until the Bishops Open Joanna Southcott's Box". A poster placed in Piccadilly Circus by Mabel Barltrop's Panacea Society in June and July 1932

Southcottians who denied the authenticity of the box that was opened in 1927 continued to press for the true box to be opened. A campaign on billboards and in national newspapers such as the Sunday Express was run in the 1960s and 1970s by a prominent group of Southcottians, the Panacea Society in Bedford (formed in 1920), to try to persuade the 24 bishops to have the box opened, claiming: "War, disease, crime and banditry, distress of nations and perplexity will increase until the Bishops open Joanna Southcott's box." From 1957 the Society claimed to hold this true box at a secret location for safekeeping, with its whereabouts to be disclosed only when a bishops' meeting has been arranged. They had obtained their box on 27 May 1957 from the widow of Cecil Kaye Jowett. In July 2001 the Panacea society allowed a photo of their box to be published. With the death of the last member of the society in 2012 their box was transferred to the Panacea Charitable Trust.

The box shown in the Panacea Museum, Bedford is understood to be a meticulous replica for display purposes. Southcott prophesied that the Day of Judgement would come in the year 2004, and her followers stated that if the contents of the box had not been studied beforehand, the world would have had to meet it unprepared.

=== In popular culture ===
Charles Dickens refers to Southcott in a description of the year 1775 at the beginning of A Tale of Two Cities.

Theologian John Henry Cardinal Newman uses “Joanna Southcote was a messenger from heaven” as a slightly less extreme case than the “heathen fancy that Enceladus lies under Etna” when discussing how a mind comes to certitude in his 1870 work An Essay in Aid of a Grammar of Assent.

Author G. K. Chesterton refers to Southcott in his 1908 book Orthodoxy, "Believing utterly in one’s self is a hysterical and superstitious belief like believing in Joanna Southcote".

Agatha Christie briefly mentions Southcott in the short story "Sing a Song of Sixpence" in The Listerdale Mystery from 1934 and again in chapter 2 of her 1968 novel, By the Pricking of My Thumbs.

Aldous Huxley mentions Southcott in chapter 22 in Crome Yellow.

== Works ==
Among her 60 publications may be mentioned:

- The Strange Effects of Faith. London: E. J. Field. 1802.
- The True Explanation of the Bible. London: S. Rousseau. 1804.
- The Book of Wonders (1813–1814)
- Prophecies announcing the birth of the Prince of Peace, extracted from the works of Joanna Southcott to which are added a few remarks thereon, made by herself, ed. Ann Underwood. London: 1814
- Joanna Southcott: A dispute between the woman and the powers of darkness (1802) New York; Woodstock: Poole 1995. ISBN 1-85477-194-9. Facsimile

== See also ==
- John Ward (1781–1837), a self-styled prophet who claimed to be Southcott's successor
- Alice Seymour – another 20th-century follower of Southcott
- Mary Bateman – A notorious 19th century cunningwoman and serial killer from Leeds who was a follower of Southcott
