= The Woodman's Daughter =

Painting by John Everett Millais

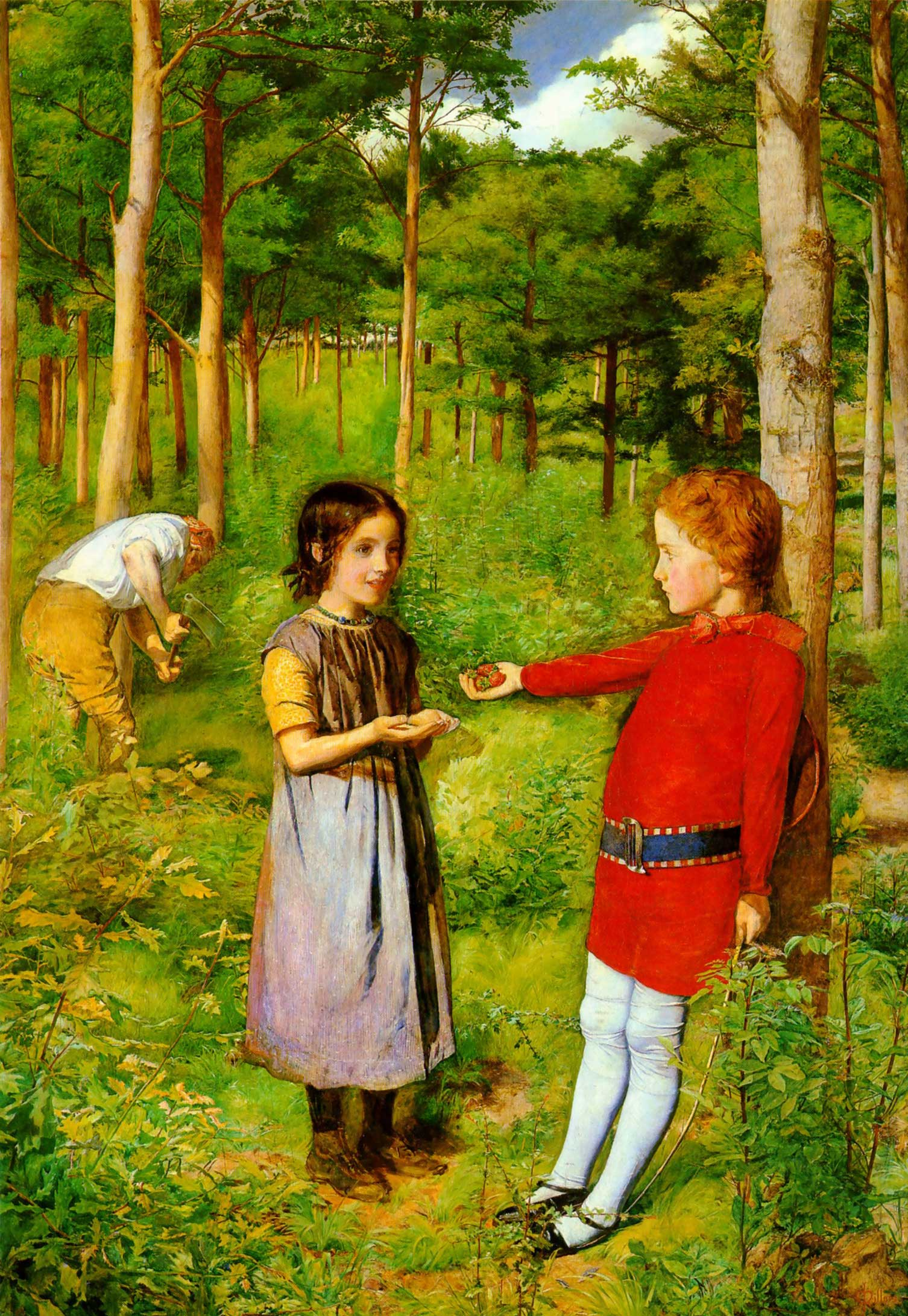
- Artist: John Everett Millais
- Year: 1850–51
- Type: Oil on canvas
- Dimensions: 89 cm × 65 cm (35 in × 26 in)
- Location: Guildhall Art Gallery, London

The Woodman's Daughter is an oil on canvas painting by English artist John Everett Millais, painted in 1850–51. It illustrates a scene from a poem by Coventry Patmore, "The Woodman's Daughter", also known as "The Tale of Poor Maud".

== The painting ==
The scene is taken from Coventry Patmore's poem, "The Woodman's Daughter", also known as "The Tale of Poor Maud", published in his 1844 volume Poems. In it, the woodman Gerald labours in the background while Merton, the squire's son leans against a tree while offering Maud, the woodman's daughter, some strawberries.

When the picture was first exhibited at the Royal Academy Exhibition of 1851, loaned by Lady Millais, it was exhibited with the following extract from the poem:

She went merely to think she helped;
And, whilst he hack’d and saw’d,
The rich squire’s son, a young boy then,
For whole days, as if awed,
Stood by and gazed alternately
At Gerald, and at Maud.

He sometimes, in a sullen tone,
Would offer fruits, and she
Always received his gifts with an air
So unreserved and free,
That half-feigned distance soon became
Familiarity. (Note: Patmore altered the text of the poem in later published editions.)

The identities of the models are unknown. The painting proved hard to sell, and was eventually bought by Millais' half-brother Henry Hodgkinson, who got Millais to repaint part of it, including the girl's face, in 1886.

The painting was presented to the Guildhall Art Gallery in London in 1921 by Lord Bearsted.

== Study ==
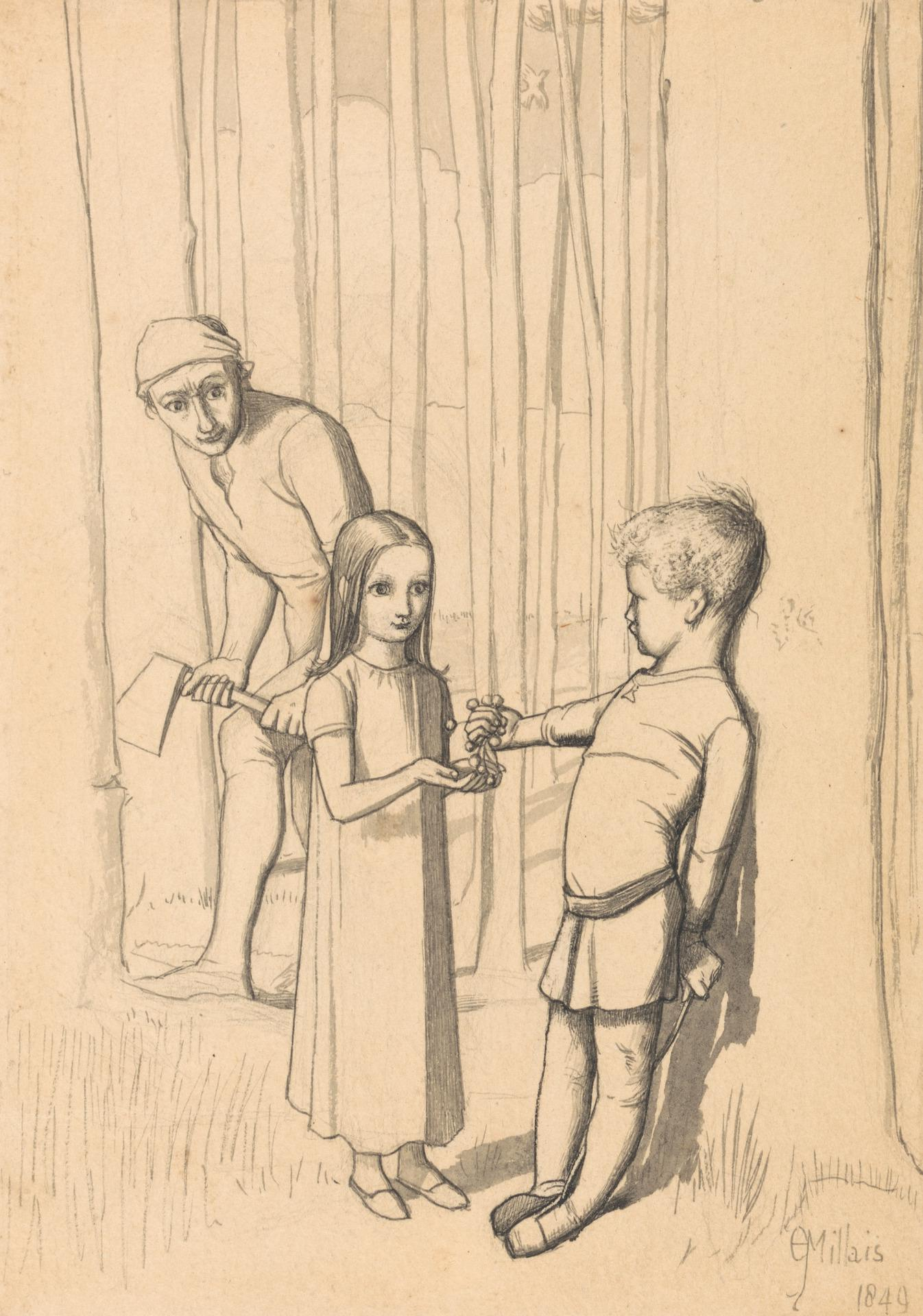
Sketch for The Woodman's Daughter by Millais dated 1849. Yale Center for British Art, New Haven, Connecticut.

Millais had been reading Patmore's poem "The Woodman's Daughter" in May 1849. An 1849 study for The Woodman's Daughter in pen, ink, wash and graphite is held in the collections of the Yale Center for British Art in New Haven, Connecticut. It is thought that this is the study that Millais showed to friends on 7 December 1849, apparently the second he had done on the subject.

== See also ==
- List of paintings by John Everett Millais
