= Coventry Patmore =

English poet and literary critic (1823–1896)

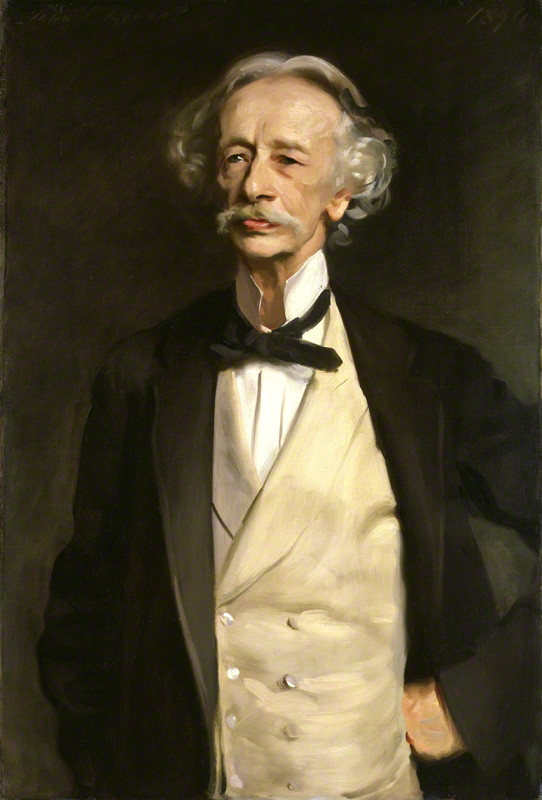
- Portrait by John Singer Sargent, 1894
- Born: Coventry Kersey Dighton Patmore; 23 July 1823; Essex, England
- Died: 26 November 1896 (aged 73); Lymington, England
- Occupations: Poet and critic

Signature
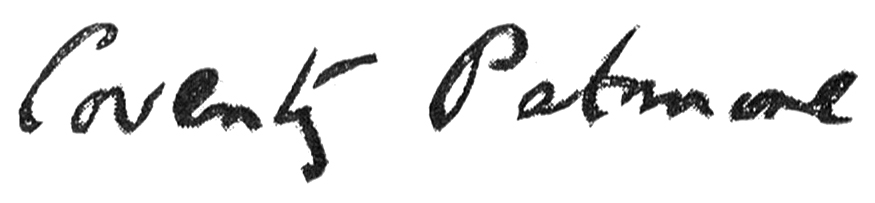

Coventry Kersey Dighton Patmore (23 July 1823 – 26 November 1896) was an English poet and literary critic. He is best known for his book of poetry The Angel in the House (1854), a narrative poem about the Victorian ideal of a happy marriage.

After the publication of his first book of poems in 1844, he became acquainted with members of the Pre-Raphaelite Brotherhood. He worked for the British Museum for 19 years, starting in 1846. His grief over the death of his first wife, Emily Augusta Patmore in 1862, became a major theme in his poetry.

== Early life ==
The eldest son of author Peter George Patmore, Patmore was born at Woodford in Essex and was privately educated. The boy was very close to his father Peter and showed an early interest in literature. Patmore's first goal was to become an artist; he earned the silver palette of the Society of Arts in 1838. In 1839, his family sent Patmore to school in France for six months, where he began to write poetry. On his return to England, Peter Patmore planned to publish some of his son's youthful poems; however, Patmore had become interested in science, and set aside writing poetry.

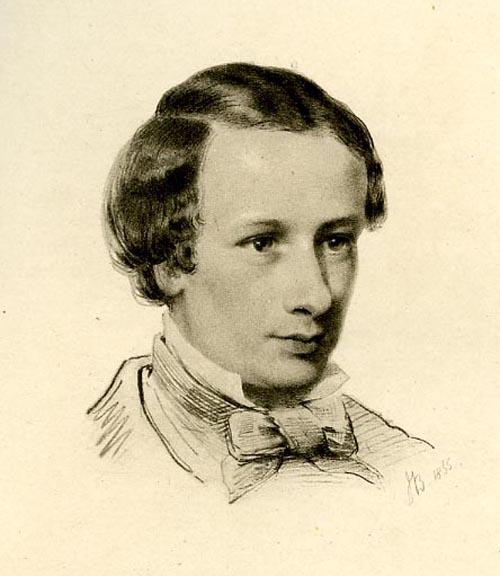
Drawing of Coventry Patmore, by John Brett, 1855.

In 1846, with help from Richard Monckton Milnes, Patmore was appointed as the printed book supernumary assistant at the British Museum. He would hold this position for the next 19 years, while devoting his spare time to writing poetry.

In 1847, Patmore married Emily Augusta Andrews, the daughter of Dr. Andrews of Camberwell. By 1851, the couple had two sons: Coventry (born 1848) and Tennyson (born 1850). Three daughters followed – Emily Honoria (born 1853), Bertha (born 1855) and Gertrude (born 1857), before their last child, a son (Henry John), was born in 1860. His wife Emily wrote under the pseudonym of Mrs Motherly. In 1859, she published The Servant's Behaviour Book, or, Hints on Manners and Dress for Maid Servants in Small Households, a conduct book for women in domestic service, written in a clear, practical manner. Nursery Poetry (1859) features lively verses on household matters, while Nursery Tales (1860) is improving and moralistic in tone. She is also considered to have had a significant role in the creation of The Children's Garland (1862), her husband's anthology of poems.

Inspired by the literary success of Alfred Tennyson, Patmore devoted more energy to his writing. In 1844, he published a small volume of Poems, which had limited commercial success. However, Patmore was more upset by a harsh review of his work in Blackwood's Magazine. Discouraged, Patmore bought up the remainder of the edition and destroyed it. His friends encouraged him to keep writing and gave him valuable feedback. Furthermore, the publication of Poems enabled him to network with other literary figures, including Dante Gabriel Rossetti. Rossetti introduced Patmore to William Holman Hunt, who brought Patmore into the Pre-Raphaelite Brotherhood, contributing his poem "The Seasons" to The Germ.

In 1849 artist John Everett Millais read Patmore's poem "The Tale of Poor Maud", also known as "The Woodman's Daughter", and produced sketches for the resulting 1850–51 painting The Woodman's Daughter. Patmore subsequently rewrote part of the poem.

During his time at the British Museum, Patmore was instrumental in starting the Volunteer Movement in 1852. He wrote an important letter to The Times on the subject, and stirred up much enthusiasm among his colleagues. He also introduced academic David Masson to Emily Rosaline Orme, his wife Emily's niece, both of whom were strong supporters for women's suffrage and rights.

== Major publications ==
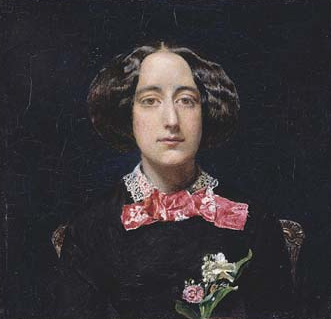
Patmore's first wife, Emily, the model for Mrs Coventry Patmore, an 1851 portrait by John Everett Millais.

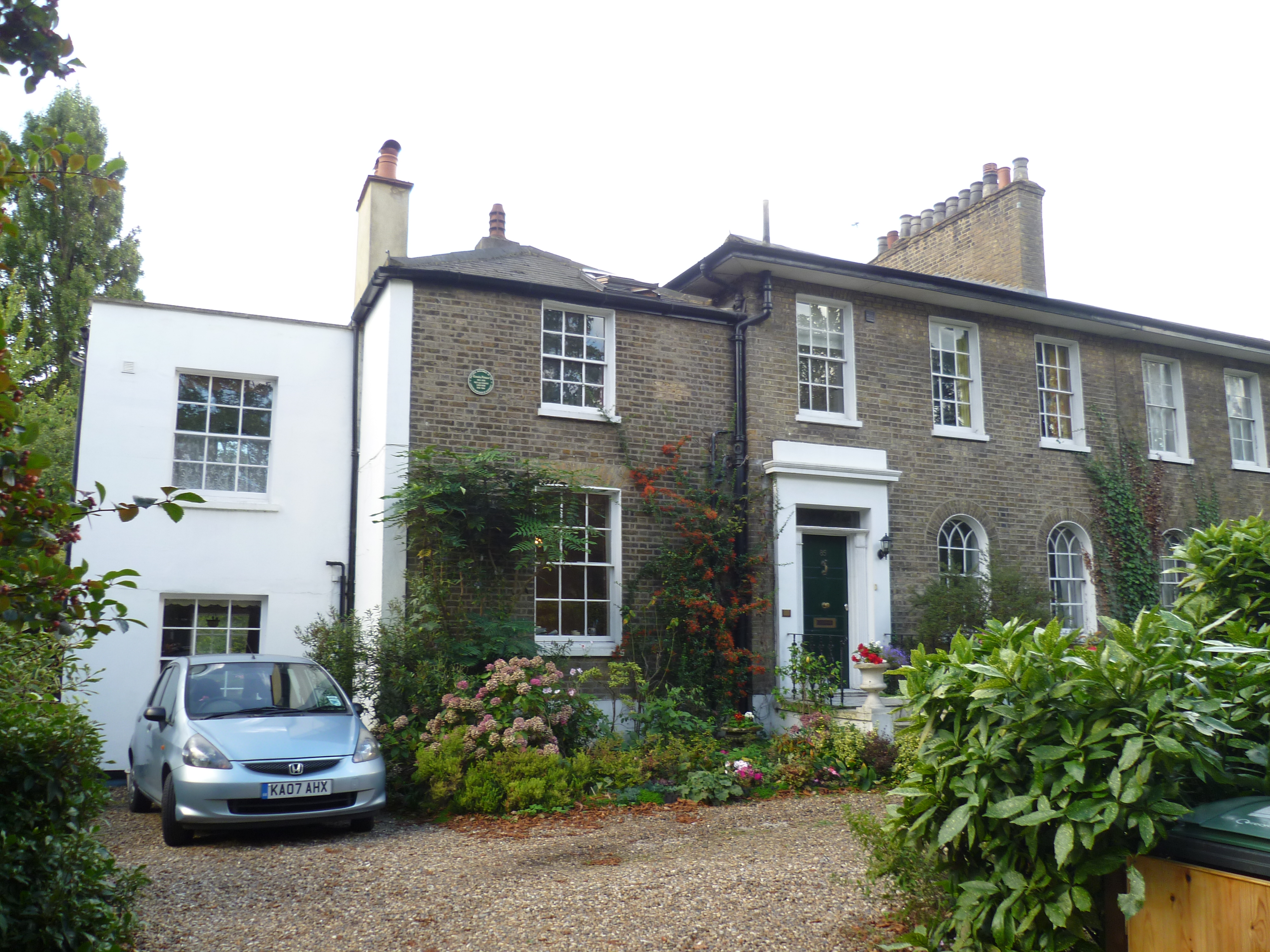
Patmore's home at 85 Fortis Green, 1858–60.

In 1853, Patmore republished Tamerton Church Tower, the more successful of his pieces from Poems of 1844. He also added several new poems that showed more sophistication in conception and treatment. In 1854, Patmore published the first part of his best-known poem, The Angel in the House. The Angel in the House is a long narrative and lyric poem, with four parts published between 1854 and 1862:

- The Betrothal (1854)
- The Espousals (1856), which eulogise his first wife;
- Faithful for Ever (1860)
- The Victories of Love (1862)

Patmore published the four works together in 1863. The works have come to symbolise the Victorian feminine ideal – which was not necessarily the ideal amongst feminists of the period.

By 1861 Patmore and his family were living in Elm Cottage, North End, Hampstead. On 5 July 1862 Emily Patmore died after a long illness, and shortly afterwards Patmore joined the Roman Catholic Church.

In 1864 Patmore married Marianne Byles, daughter of James Byles of Bowden Hall, Gloucester. Patmore purchased Buxted Hall in East Sussex in 1865, which he described in How I managed my Estate (1886). In 1877 Patmore published The Unknown Eros, which some commentators believe contains his finest poetic work, and in 1878 Amelia, his own favourite among his poems, together with an essay on English Metrical Law. This departure into criticism continued in 1879 with a volume of papers entitled Principle in Art, and again in 1893 with Religio Poetae.

Patmore's second wife Marianne died in 1880, and in 1881 he married Harriet Robson from Bletchingley in Surrey (born 1840), his children's governess. Their son Francis was born in 1882. Patmore also had a deep friendship with the poet Alice Meynell, lasting several years. He ultimately fell in love with her, forcing Meynell to end their relationship.

In later years Patmore lived at Lymington, where he died in 1896. He was buried in Lymington churchyard.

== Evaluation ==
A collected edition of Patmore's poems appeared in two volumes in 1886, with a characteristic preface which might serve as the author's epitaph. "I have written little", it runs; "but it is all my best; I have never spoken when I had nothing to say, nor spared time or labour to make my words true. I have respected posterity; and should there be a posterity which cares for letters, I dare to hope that it will respect me." The sincerity which underlies this statement, combined with a certain lack of humour which peers through its naïveté, points to two of the principal characteristics of Patmore's earlier poetry; characteristics which came to be almost unconsciously merged and harmonized as his style and his intention drew together into unity.

"Spring Cottage, Hamstead, 1860." Caricature by Max Beerbohm.

His later themes shifted from love to grief, loss, death, and immortality, which he explored through poetic imagery and varying forms in the odes of The Unknown Eros. The collection contains passages and entire poems focused on these concepts, utilizing structured melody and spiritual themes. His works include a piece about winter, "Departure", and "The Toys". His political opinions, which are also expressed in his odes and essays, receive less praise today. Patmore is currently among the lesser-known Victorian poets who retain critical regard.

His son Henry John Patmore (1860–1883) also became a poet.

== Works ==
- Principles in Art. London: George Bell and Sons, 1889.
- Courage in Politics and other Essays. London: Oxford University Press, 1921.

=== Articles ===
- "William Barnes, the Dorset Poet," The Library Magazine, Vol. II, November 1886/March 1887.
- “Distinction,” The Eclectic Magazine, Vol. LII, 1890
- "Three Essayettes," The Eclectic Magazine, Vol. LVI, July/December 1892.

== References and sources ==
=== Sources ===
- Badeni, June (1981). The slender tree : a life of Alice Meynell. Padstow, Cornwall: Tabb House. ISBN 0-907018-01-7.
- Meynell, Alice (1911). "Coventry Patmore" . In Herbermann, Charles (ed.). Catholic Encyclopedia. Vol. 11. New York: Robert Appleton Company.
- Garnett, Richard (1901). "Patmore, Coventry Kersey Dighton" . In Lee, Sidney (ed.). Dictionary of National Biography (1st supplement). London: Smith, Elder & Co.
- Maynard, John. "Patmore, Coventry Kersey Deighton (1823–1896)". Oxford Dictionary of National Biography (online ed.). Oxford University Press. doi:10.1093/ref:odnb/21550. (Subscription, Wikipedia Library access or UK public library membership required.)
