= Panacea Society =

Millenarian religious group in Bedford, England

Coordinates: 52.1364°N 0.4627°W

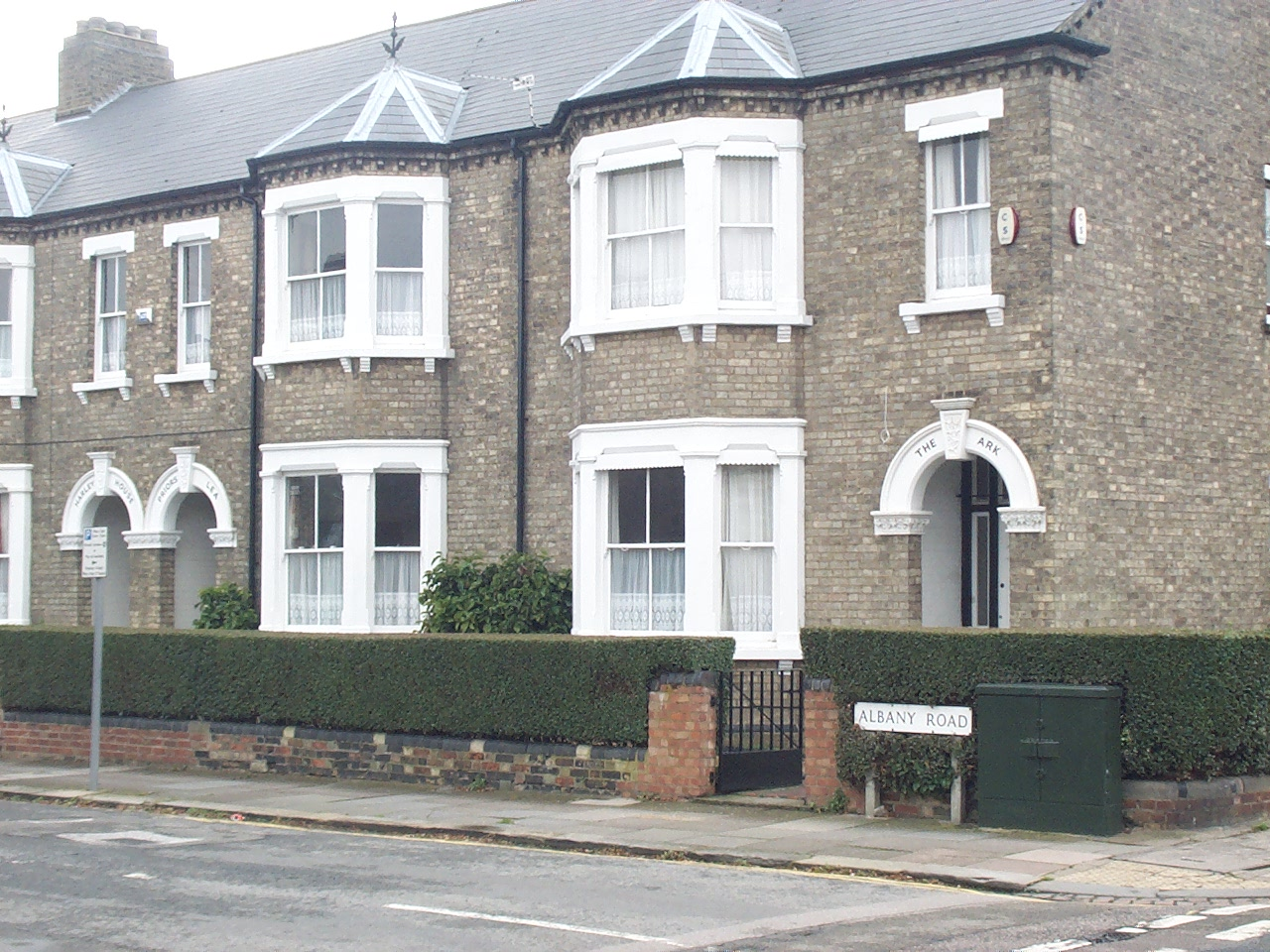
"The Ark" in Bedford.

The Panacea Society was a millenarian religious group in Bedford, England. Founded in 1919, it followed the teachings of the Devonshire prophetess Joanna Southcott, who died in 1814, and campaigned for Southcott's sealed box of prophecies to be opened according to her instructions. The society believed Bedford (within a three-mile radius of their church) to be the original site of the Garden of Eden.

== History ==
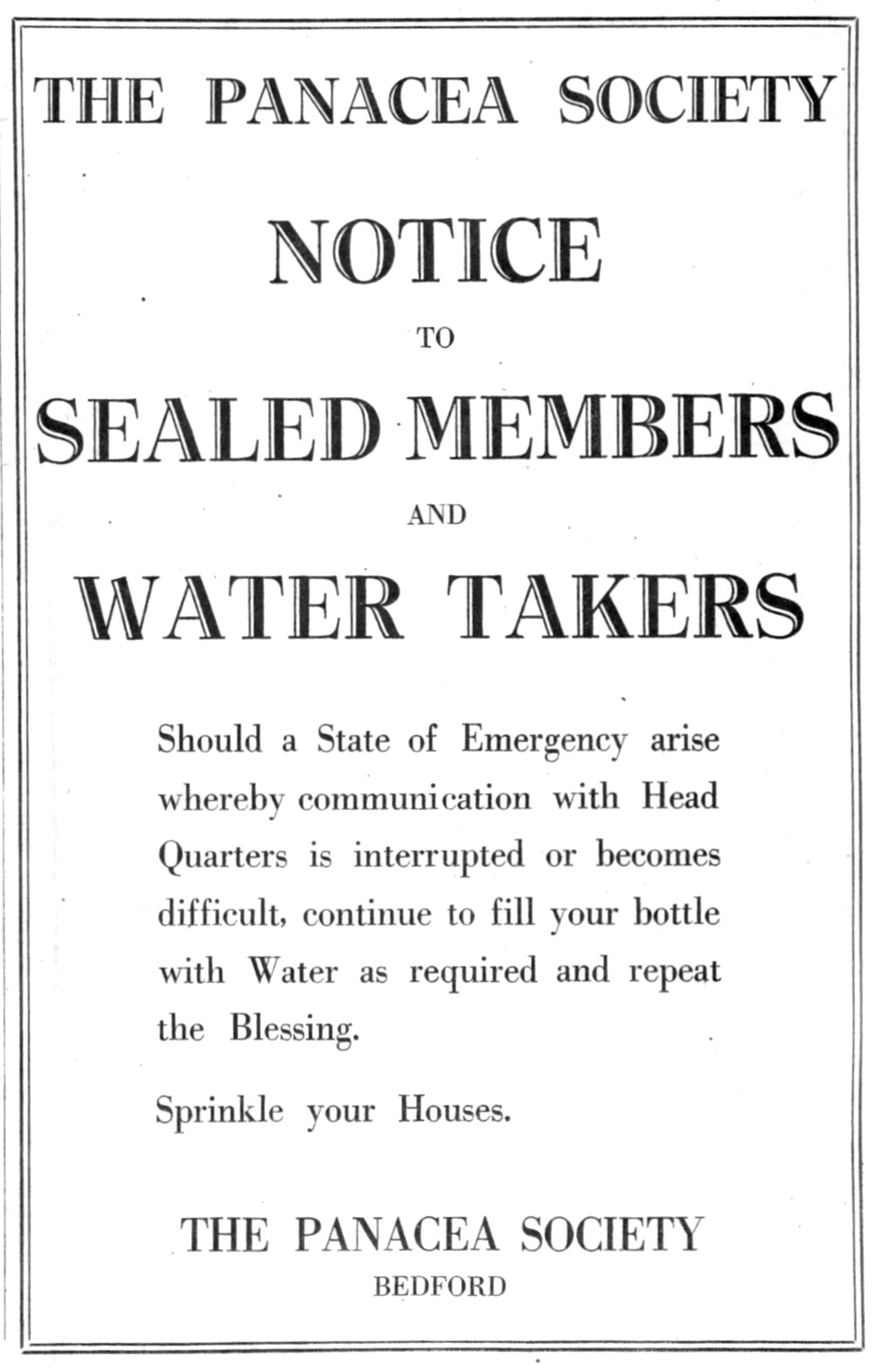
The notice placed in The Daily Telegraph by the society on the outbreak of the Second World War on 4 September 1939.

The Society's inspiration was the teachings of the Devonshire prophetess Joanna Southcott (1750–1814). It was founded by Mabel Barltrop in 1919 at 12 Albany Road, Bedford. A clergyman's widow, Barltrop declared herself the 'daughter of God', took the name Octavia and believed herself to be the Shiloh of Southcott's prophecies. Barltrop had originally heard of Southcott via a leaflet written by Alice Seymour. She and 12 apostles founded the Society, originally called the Community of the Holy Ghost.

A central purpose of the Society was to persuade 24 Anglican bishops to open Southcott's sealed box of prophecies and, to this end, advertisements were placed in newspapers, both national and local. In the late 1920s and early 1930s the Society generated over 100,000 petitions for the box to be opened. On 27 May 1957, the Society claimed to be in possession of the original box which they had obtained from the widow of Cecil Kaye Jowett. The Panaceans also believed that the one that was opened in 1927 and found to contain a broken horse pistol and a lottery ticket, was not the genuine box.

In 1929 the society purchased "Castleside", a large house next to their base, that was being used as a boarding house for schoolboys. After the boarders had moved out the house was converted into a building set up facilitate the opening of the box. This included a room for opening the box and housing for the bishops. In the 2000s the surviving members of the society decided that the bishops would be better accommodated in the local hotels.

During the 1930s the membership began to dwindle as did Alice Seymour's smaller rival group.

Despite this, the group continued placing advertisements in newspapers calling for action from the Church of England. In the 1970s, the Society rented billboards which proclaimed "War, disease, crime and banditry, distress of nations and perplexity will increase until the Bishops open Joanna Southcott's box."

Another main activity of the Panacea Society was to offer healing of all diseases, including cancer, to those who would write to its headquarters in Bedford and receive a piece of linen blessed by Octavia. They were instructed to put the linen in a jug of water, pray, and drink this "Water A" four times a day. Water A could then be diluted with additional water, producing "Water B," which should be applied to the body as bath water or through sponges. From 1924 to 2012, some 130,000 applicants received the pieces of linen for free, and were only asked to write back and report on the results of the cure. The correspondence, coming from all over the world, is still conserved in the Bedford Panacea Museum, and has been studied in 2019 in a book by British scholar Alastair Lockhart.

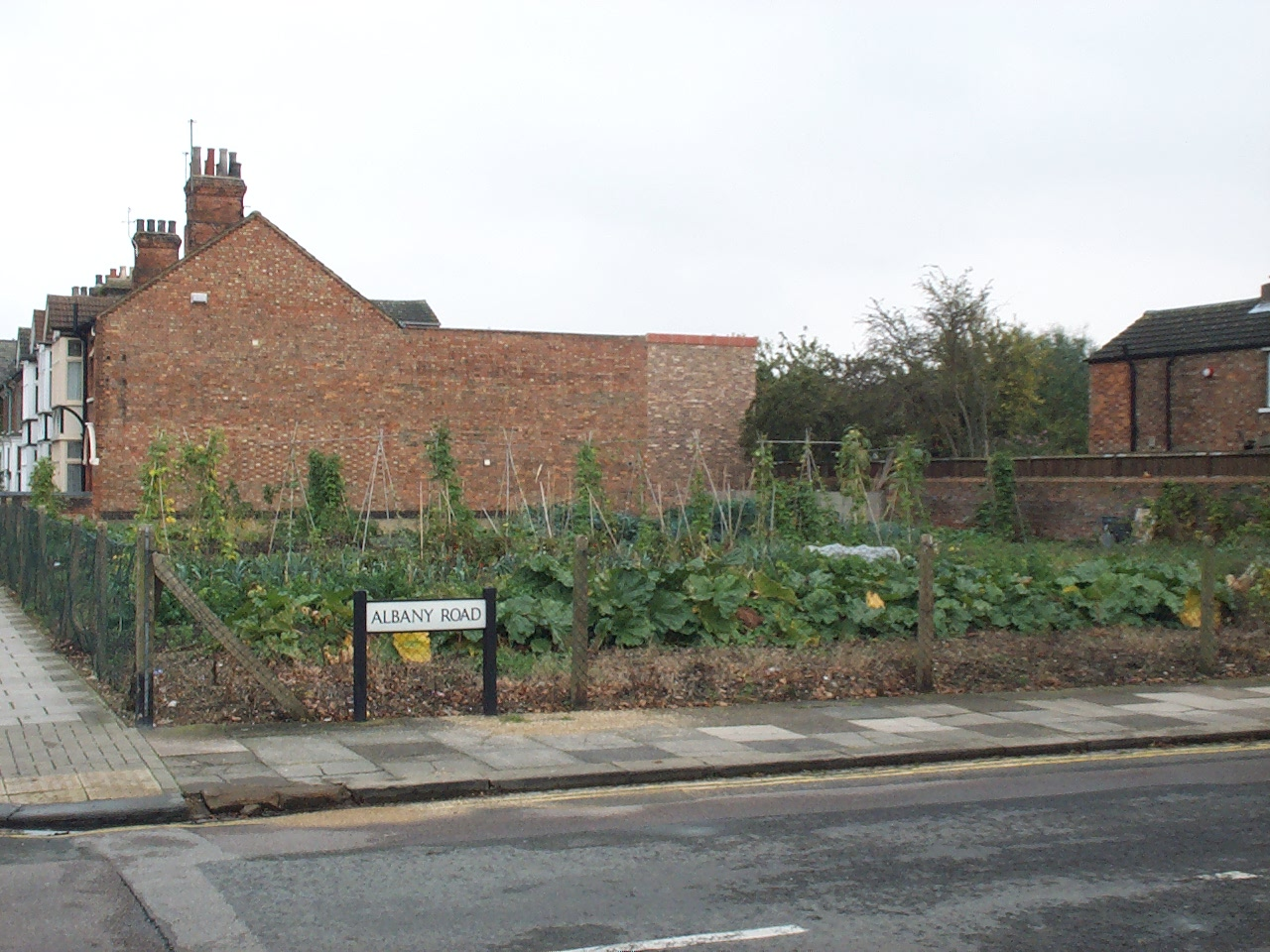
The Society's allotments. The members claimed Bedford to be the original site of the Garden of Eden.

== Premises ==
The Society had its headquarters on Albany Road, close to the remains of Bedford Castle. Another property, an end-of-terrace house on Albany Road named The Ark, was maintained as a residence for the Messiah after the Second Coming.

Although small in size, the Society was relatively wealthy, owning several properties in the Castle Road area of Bedford. By 2001, when the Society started to sell off some of its property in order to retain its status as a charity, it was reported to have assets valued at £14m.

== Membership ==
In the 1930s, about 70 members were said to be living in the Bedford community. In 1967, the Bedfordshire Times reported about 30 members living there. When the last member, Ruth Klein (born 1934), died in 2012, the Society ceased to exist as a religious community.

== Beliefs ==
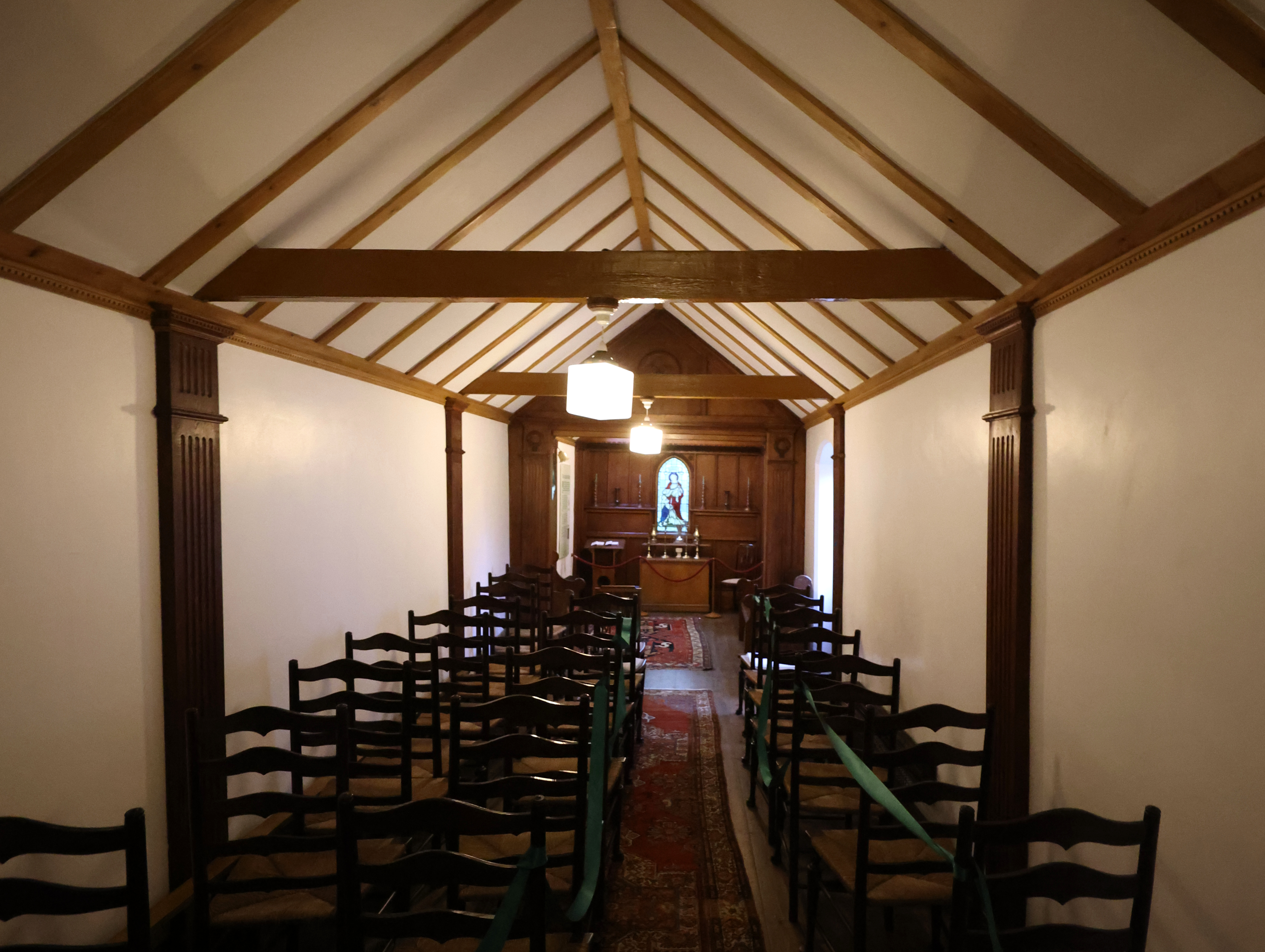
Interior of the Panacea Society's chapel

The panaceans originally believed that through overcoming sin it was possible for them not to die. After a number of deaths in their community including their founder they also allowed for the possibility that they would die and go to join immortal beings on Uranus until the return of Christ.

The belief that Bedford was the site of the Garden of Eden appears to have evolved from events around the expulsion of Edgar Peissart from the group in early 1923. The expulsion involved an exorcism in the building then known as the garden room which would later become the chapel. This in turn led to the development of a ritual known as Casting of Controls where members of the society, sometimes present sometimes not, would be exorcised with the intent of removing the controls of Satan over them. From this came the idea that the location of the chapel was a place that had always been somewhere Satan could not influence and hence the Garden of Eden.

== Charitable trust ==
Whilst the religious society is no longer functioning, there still exists a charity whose main remit is to sponsor academic research into the history and development of prophetic and millenarian movements, as well as provide financial assistance to support the work of registered charities and recognised groups concerned with poverty and health in the Bedford area. The charity changed its name to The Panacea Charitable Trust in 2012.

The trust is wealthy; Frances Stonor Saunders, writing in The Guardian, noted "a long-term investment portfolio worth £20m, in addition to £3m in own use assets", and said that "The society's published accounts for the past five years show donations of nearly £500,000 to something called the Prophecy Project. Based at New College, Oxford".

== Panacea Museum ==
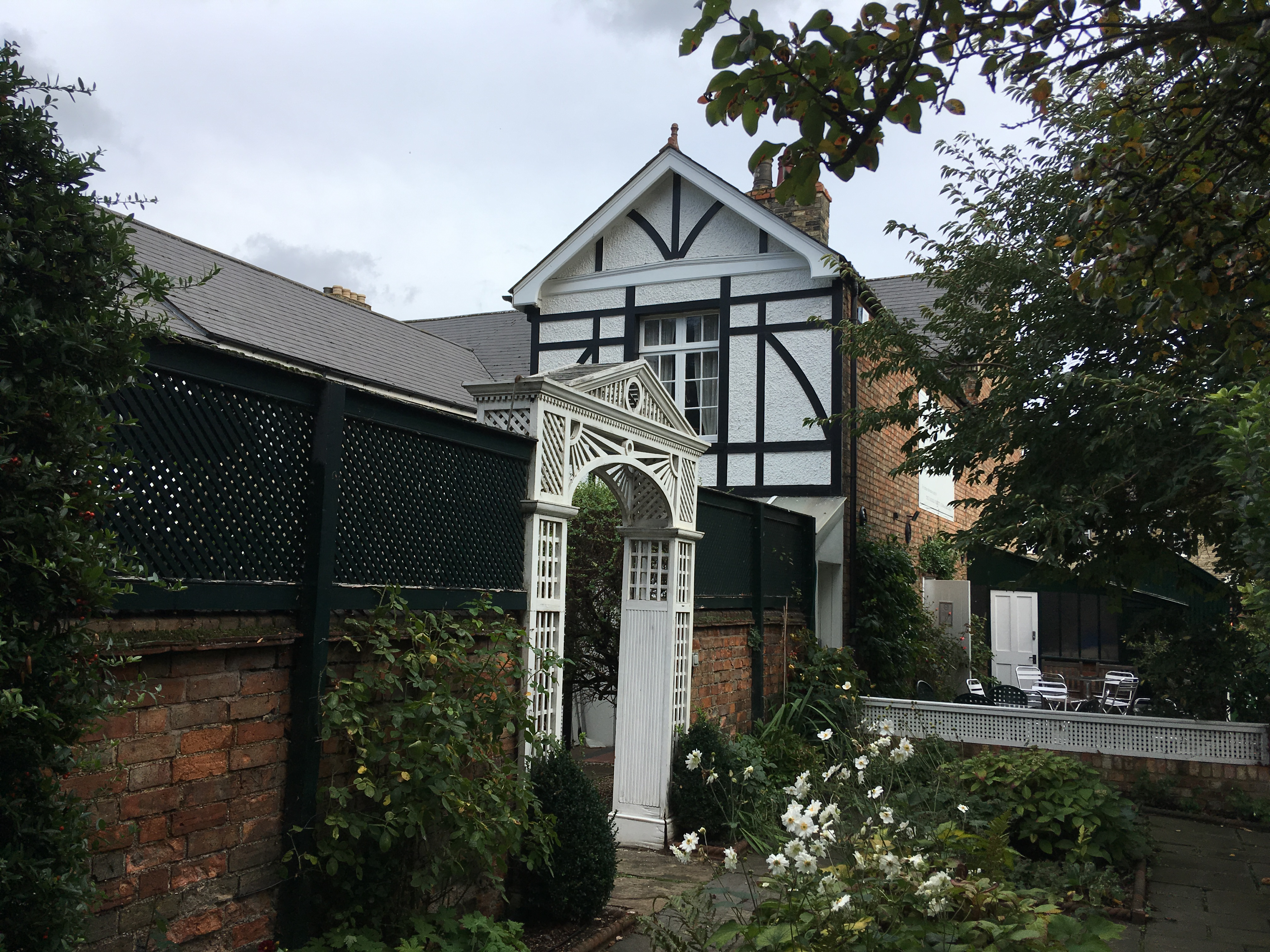
The Founder's House at the Panacea Museum viewed from the garden.

In late 2012, it was announced that the charitable trust would be opening a museum detailing the history of the society, at 9 Newnham Road, Bedford. The Panacea Museum is in 'Castleside', a Victorian house that was part of the community's headquarters. It tells the story of the Panacea Society and other similar religious groups.

The museum also incorporates several other buildings, set within the gardens, that formed the original community's 'campus'. The museum is open every Thursday, Friday, Saturday and Sunday between February half term and the end of October.
