= List of schools in France =

This is a list of schools in France, organized by region. There are more than 60 thousand schools in France, so this list only includes those with Wikipedia articles.

== Auvergne-Rhône-Alpes ==
- Agricultural school of Cibeins, Misérieux
- Ensemble Scolaire Maurice-Tièche, Collonges-sous-Salève
- Le Marais Sainte-Thérèse Professional School, Saint-Étienne
- Lycée Anna de Noailles, Évian-les-Bains
- Lycée international de Ferney-Voltaire, Ferney-Voltaire
- Lycée Jean-Zay, Thiers
- Notre Dame de Mongré High School, Villefranche-sur-Saône

=== Grenoble ===
- American School of Grenoble
- Cité Scolaire Internationale Europole
- Lycée Champollion
- Lycée Stendhal
- Lycée Vaucanson

=== Lyon ===
- Cité Scolaire Internationale de Lyon
- Collège-lycée Ampère
- Fénelon - La Trinité School
- International School of Lyon
- Lycée du Parc
- Lycée La Martinière Monplaisir
- Lycée Saint-Marc

== Bourgogne-Franche-Comté ==
- Stéphen Liégeard High School, Brochon

== Centre-Val de Loire ==
- Lycée Choiseul, Tours
- Lycée Konan, Saint-Cyr-sur-Loire
- Lycée Vaucanson

== Grand Est ==
- François I School Complex, Vitry-le-François
- Lycée Camille Sée, Colmar
- Lycée Fabert, Metz
- Lycée Jean Mermoz, Saint-Louis
- Lycée Notre-Dame Saint-Sigisbert, Nancy
- Saint-Joseph of Reims, Reims

=== Strasbourg ===
- DFG / LFA Strasbourg
- European School of Strasbourg
- Jean Sturm Gymnasium
- Lycée Kléber
- Pontonniers International High School
- Russian Consulate School in Strasbourg

== Hauts-de-France ==
- Collège de Tourcoing, Tourcoing
- École Saint-Joseph, Solesmes
- Institution Saint-Michel, Solesmes
- Lycée Alexandre Ribot, Saint-Omer
- Lycée César Baggio, Lille
- Lycée Faidherbe, Lille
- Lycée International Montebello, Lille
- Lycée la Providence, Amiens
- Lycée Valentine Labbé, La Madeleine
- Lycée Yves-Kernanec, Marcq-en-Barœul
- Lycée-Collège Averroès, Lille

== Île-de-France ==
=== Essonne ===
- Lycée Alfred Kastler, Dourdan
- Lycée Georges Brassens, Évry-Courcouronnes
- Lycée Pierre Mendès, Ris-Orangis

=== Hauts-de-Seine ===
- American School of Paris, Saint-Cloud
- European School of Paris-La Défense, La Défense
- Groupe Scolaire Maïmonide Rambam, Boulogne-Billancourt
- Institut Notre-Dame, Bourg-la-Reine
- Institution Notre-Dame de Sainte-Croix, Neuilly-sur-Seine
- Internationale Deutsche Schule Paris, Saint-Cloud
- Liceo Español Luis Buñuel, Neuilly-sur-Seine
- Lycée Albert-Camus, Bois-Colombes
- Lycée Alexandre Dumas, Saint-Cloud
- Lycée Charles Petiet, Villeneuve-la-Garenne
- Lycée des métiers Florian, Sceaux
- Lycée Eugène-Ionesco, Issy-les-Moulineaux
- Lycée Galilée, Gennevilliers
- Lycée Jacques Prévert, Boulogne-Billancourt
- Lycée Jean Pierre Vernant, Sèvres
- Lycée Léonard de Vinci, Levallois-Perret
- Lycée Marie Curie, Sceaux
- Lycée Michelet, Vanves
- Lycée Pasteur, Neuilly-sur-Seine
- Lycée Paul Lapie, Courbevoie
- Marymount International School, Neuilly-sur-Seine

=== Paris ===
==== Public Schools ====
- Collège Louis-Michel
- Collège Stanislas de Paris
- Collège-lycée Jacques-Decour
- Lycée Arago
- Lycée Buffon
- Lycée Camille Sée
- Lycée Carnot
- Lycée Chaptal
- Lycée Charlemagne
- Lycée Claude-Bernard
- Lycée Claude-Monet
- Lycée Condorcet
- Lycée Dorian
- Lycée et collège Victor-Duruy
- Lycée Fénelon
- Lycée Hélène Boucher
- Lycée Henri-IV
- Lycée innovant de Paris
- Lycée Janson-de-Sailly
- Lycée Jean-Baptiste-Say
- Lycée Jules-Ferry
- Lycée La Fontaine
- Lycée Louis-le-Grand
- Lycée Montaigne
- Lycée Paul Valéry
- Lycée Racine
- Lycée Raspail
- Lycée Rodin
- Lycée Saint-Louis
- Lycée Sophie Germain
- Lycée Turgot
- Lycée Voltaire
- Lycée Victor Hugo

==== Private Schools ====
- Collège Sévigné
- Cours Hattemer
- École alsacienne
- École Yabné
- Lycée Edgar-Poe

==== Catholic Schools ====
- Collège Stanislas de Paris
- École Massillon
- Ensemble Scolaire Saint Michel de Picpus
- Établissement La Rochefoucauld
- Lycée Blomet
- Lycée Carcado-Saisseval
- Lycée des Francs-Bourgeois
- Lycée Fénelon Sainte-Marie
- Lycée Rocroy-Saint-Léon
- Lycée Saint-Louis-de-Gonzague
- Lycée Saint-Thomas-d'Aquin
- Saint-Jean de Passy

==== International Schools ====
- Colegio Español Federico García Lorca
- École Jeannine Manuel
- International School of Paris
- Istituto Statale Italiano Leonardo Da Vinci
- Russian Embassy School in Paris
- Svenska Skolan Paris
- Szkoła Narodowa Polska w Paryżu

=== Seine-et-Marne ===
- Lycée Émilie du Châtelet, Serris
- Lycée François-Ier, Fontainebleau
- Lycée Jean Moulin, Torcy
- Lycée Léonard de Vinci, Melun
- Lycée Martin Luther King, Bussy-Saint-Georges
- Lycée René Descartes, Champs-sur-Marne
- Lycée Thibaut de Champagne, Provins

=== Seine-Saint-Denis ===
- Collège-Lycée La Réussite, Aubervilliers
- Ensemble Scolaire Jean-Baptiste de La Salle - Notre-Dame de la Compassion, Saint-Denis
- Lycée Albert Schweitzer, Le Raincy
- Lycée Alfred Nobel, Clichy-sous-Bois
- Lycée Bartholdi, Saint-Denis
- Lycée Condorcet, Montreuil
- Lycée Évariste Galois, Noisy-le-Grand
- Lycée Flora Tristan, Noisy-le-Grand
- Lycée Georges Clemenceau, Villemomble
- Lycée Germaine Tillion, Le Bourget
- Lycée Gustave Eiffel, Gagny
- Lycée Hélène Boucher, Tremblay-en-France
- Lycée Henri Wallon, Aubervilliers
- Lycée Jean Jaurès, Montreuil
- Lycée Le Corbusier, Aubervilliers
- Lycée Léonard de Vinci, Tremblay-en-France
- Lycée Maurice Utrillo, Stains
- Lycée Paul Éluard, Saint-Denis
- Lycée Paul Robert, Les Lilas
- Lycée Robert Schuman, Dugny
- Lycée Suger, Saint-Denis
- Lycée Voillaume, Aulnay-sous-Bois

=== Val-d'Oise ===
- Etablissement Notre-Dame-de-la-Compassion, Pontoise/Jouy-le-Moutier
- Lycée Alfred Kastler de Cergy-Pontoise, Cergy
- Lycée Camille Claudel, Vauréal
- Lycée Camille Pissarro, Pontoise
- Lycée Galilée, Cergy
- Lycée Jean Jacques Rousseau, Sarcelles
- Lycée Jules Verne, Cergy
- Lycée Léonard de Vinci, Saint-Witz
- Lycée Pierre Mendès, Villiers-le-Bel
- Lycée René Cassin, Gonesse
- Lycée Romain Rolland, Goussainville

=== Val-de-Marne ===
- École des technologies numériques avancées, Ivry-sur-Seine
- Ensemble Scolaire Saint Michel de Picpus, Saint-Mandé
- Lycée Frédéric Mistral, Fresnes
- Lycée Georges Brassens, Villeneuve-le-Roi
- Lycée Guillaume Apollinaire, Thiais
- Lycée intercommunal Darius-Milhaud, Le Kremlin-Bicêtre
- Lycée Maximilien Perret, Alfortville
- Lycée Maximilien Sorre, Cachan
- Lycée polyvalent Pauline Roland, Chevilly-Larue

=== Yvelines ===
- British School of Paris, Croissy-sur-Seine
- DFG / LFA Buc, Buc
- École Notre-Dame les Oiseaux/Notre-Dame International High School, Verneuil-sur-Seine
- Ensemble scolaire Le Bon Sauveur, Le Vésinet
- Ermitage International School Paris, Maisons-Laffitte
- École Japonaise de Paris, Montigny-le-Bretonneux
- Institut de formation de Saint-Quentin-en-Yvelines, Montigny-le-Bretonneux
- Institut Notre-Dame, Saint-Germain-en-Laye/Sartrouville
- Lycée Alain, Le Vésinet
- Lycée Corneille, La Celle-Saint-Cloud
- Lycée Hoche, Versailles
- Lycée Descartes de Montigny le Bretonneux, Montigny-le-Bretonneux
- Lycée Dumont d'Urville, Maurepas
- Lycée Évariste Galois, Sartrouville
- Lycée International de Saint-Germain-en-Laye, Saint-Germain-en-Laye
- Lycée Les Pierres Vives, Carrières-sur-Seine
- Lycée militaire de Saint-Cyr, Saint-Cyr-l'École
- Lycée privé Sainte-Geneviève, Versailles
- Saint Jean Hulst, Versailles
- Section Internationale Anglophone de Buc, Buc

== Normandy ==
- Lycée André Maurois, Deauville
- Lycée Malherbe, Caen
- Lycée Pierre-Corneille, Rouen

== Nouvelle-Aquitaine ==
- Bordeaux International School, Bordeaux
- Laure-Gatet High School, Périgueux
- Lycée Edmond Perrier, Tulle
- Lycée Louis-Barthou, Pau
- Lycée Montaigne, Bordeaux
- Lycée Nelson Mandela, Poitiers
- Lycée Polyvalent Mixte Maine de Biran, Bergerac
- Lycée Saint Cricq, Pau
- Lycée Saint-Joseph-de-Tivoli, Bordeaux
- Union chrétienne de Saint-Chaumond, Poitiers

== Occitania ==
- Deutsche Schule Toulouse, Colomiers
- International School of Toulouse, Colomiers
- Lycée Chaptal, Mende
- Lycée François-Arago, Perpignan
- Lycée Saint-Exupéry, Blagnac

== Pays de la Loire ==
- Chavagnes International College, Chavagnes-en-Paillers
- Colbert de Torcy, Sablé-sur-Sarthe
- Lycée Emmanuel Mounier, Angers
- Lycée Gabriel Guist'hau, Nantes
- Lycée Georges Clemenceau, Nantes
- Lycée Nelson Mandela, Nantes
- Prytanée national militaire, La Flèche

== Provence-Alpes-Côte d'Azur ==
- École et Collège Saint-Mauront, Marseille
- École Tour-Sainte, Marseille
- International Bilingual School of Provence, Luynes
- Lycée Bonaparte, Toulon
- Lycée International Georges Duby, Luynes
- Lycée Saint-Exupéry, Marseille
- Lycée Saint-Joseph of Avignon, Avignon
- Provence School, Marseille
