= Lycée Français de Palma =

French international school in Spain

Lycée Français de Palma Spanish: Liceo francés de Palma

Information
- School type: International School
- Age: 2 to 18
- Enrollment: c.540 (2019)
- Language: French

Lycée Français de Palma (LFP; Spanish: Liceo francés de Palma) is a French international school in [Sa Teulera] (ES/CA), Palma de Mallorca, Spain. It teaches all levels, age 2 to 18, from Kindergarten (Toute Petite Section) to high school.

As of 2019 the school has over 540 students. The secondary school is located on Carrer Lluis Fabregas while the main building, housing kindergarten and primary classes, is on Carrer de la Salut.

== See also ==
- Liceo Español Luis Buñuel, a Spanish international school near Paris, France
