= LELB =

LELB may refer to

- Evangelical Lutheran Church of Latvia (Latvian: Latvijas Evaņģēliski luteriskā baznīca)
- Evangelical Lutheran Church in Lithuania (Lithuanian: Lietuvos Evangelikų Liuteronų Bažnyčia)
- Liceo Español Luis Buñuel, a Spanish-language school in France
