= Lycée Nelson Mandela =

Lycée Nelson Mandela may refer to:

- Lycée Nelson Mandela (Nantes)
- Lycée Nelson Mandela (Poitiers)
