= Lycée Bartholdi =

Lycée Frédéric Bartholdi may refer to the following French schools:

- Lycée Bartholdi (Barentin), Barentin
- Lycée Bartholdi (Colmar), Colmar
- Lycée Bartholdi (Saint-Denis, Seine-Saint-Denis), Paris area
