= Lycée Jean Jaurès =

Lycée Jean Jaurès may refer to:

- Lycée Jean Jaurès - Argenteuil (Paris area)
- Lycée Jean-Jaurès - Châtenay-Malabry (Paris area)
- Lycée Jean Jaurès - Montreuil, Seine-Saint-Denis (Paris area)
- Lycée Jean-Jaurès - Reims
