= Lycée Emmanuel Mounier =

Lycée Emmanuel Mounier may refer to the following French schools:

- Lycée Emmanuel Mounier - Angers
- Lycée Emmanuel-Mounier - Châtenay-Malabry
- Lycée Emmanuel-Mounier - Grenoble
