= 3rd arrondissement of Marseille =

- Municipal arrondissement
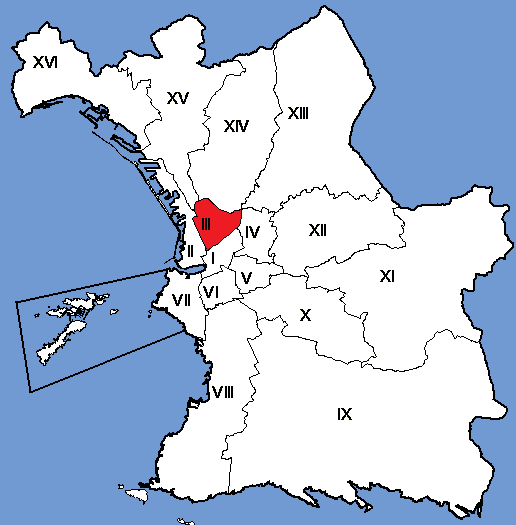
- Location within Marseille
- Interactive map of 3rd arrondissement of Marseille
- Coordinates: 43.3117°N 5.3809°E
- Country: France
- Region: Provence-Alpes-Côte d'Azur
- Department: Bouches-du-Rhône
- Commune: Marseille

Government
  - Mayor (2020–2026): Anthony Krehmeier (PS)
- Area: 2.60 km^{2} (1.00 sq mi)
- Population (2023): 58,029
  - Density: 22,300/km^{2} (57,800/sq mi)
- INSEE code: 13203

The 3rd arrondissement of Marseille is one of the 16 arrondissements of Marseille. It is governed locally together with the 2nd arrondissement, with which it forms the 2nd sector of Marseille.

== Population ==
Historical population
Year	Pop.	±% p.a.
1968	53,633	—
1975	45,431	−2.34%
1982	42,198	−1.05%
1990	42,414	+0.06%
1999	42,031	−0.10%
2007	45,414	+0.97%
2012	44,666	−0.33%
2017	48,764	+1.77%
2023	58,029	+2.94%
Source: INSEE

Neighbourhood	Population (2022)
Belle de Mai	15,649
Saint-Lazare	13,855
Saint-Mauront	16,300
La Villette	9,847

== Education ==
Ecole et Collège Saint-Mauront, a private Catholic elementary and junior high school, is in the 3rd arrondissement.
