= Fénelon - La Trinité School =

Jesuit school in Lyon, France

Coordinates: 45°46′6″N 4°50′49″E

Location
- 31 rue de Sèze; Lyon, 69006; France

Information
- Type: Private middle and secondary school
- Religious affiliation: Catholicism
- Denomination: Jesuits
- Established: Fénelon College: 1519; 507 years ago; La Trinité Lycée: 1892; 134 years ago
- Staff: 110
- Gender: Coeducational
- Age range: 10 through 18
- Enrollment: 1,000
- Website: www.fenelon-trinite.fr

Fénelon - La Trinité School is a private Catholic middle and secondary school, located Lyon, France. The secondary school, Fénelon College, is located at 1 rue Paul-Michel Perret; and the middle school, La Trinité Lycée, is located at 31 rue de Sèze. The secondary school was founded in 1519 and has been managed by the Society of Jesus since 1564.

== History ==
The secondary school, founded in 1519, is perhaps the oldest such in Lyon. It was entrusted to the Society of Jesus in 1564 and moved to its present location in the 1920s. In 1947 the Jesuits entrusted the school to lay management.

The middle school began in 1892 as a girls school run by the Sisters of Nazareth. Both schools have remained dedicated to the Ignatian Pedagogical Paradigm of the Jesuits.

Trinité and Fénelon began working together in the 1970s and became coeducational. The Catholic diocese gave ownership of the school to the Jesuits in 2003. Common administration of the two schools was completed in 2006. There are about 600 enrolled in the college and 400 in the lycée. The school had a 95% success rate in the Baccalauréat in 2016.

== See also ==
- List of schools in France
- List of Jesuit schools
