= Lycée Saint Cricq =

Saint-Cricq High School
- Lycée Saint-Cricq

Location
- 4 bis, avenue des États-Unis BP 1516 - 64015; Pau, Pyrénées-Atlantiques; France
- Coordinates: 43.300923°N 0.359679°W

Information
- Type: Lycée
- Established: c.1901
- Proviseur: François-Olivier JOYET
- Enrollment: 1,600
- Website: School web site

The Saint-Cricq High School, known in French as Lycée Saint-Cricq is a public High school in Pau, Pyrénées-Atlantiques, France.

There are 1600 students. The pupils are 15 to 18 years old for preparing to take the baccalauréat and 18 to 20 years old for doing a post baccalauréat formation. The proviseur is François-Olivier JOYET.

== See also ==
- Education in France
- Lycée Henri-IV
- Lycée Janson de Sailly
- Secondary education in France

== Gallery ==
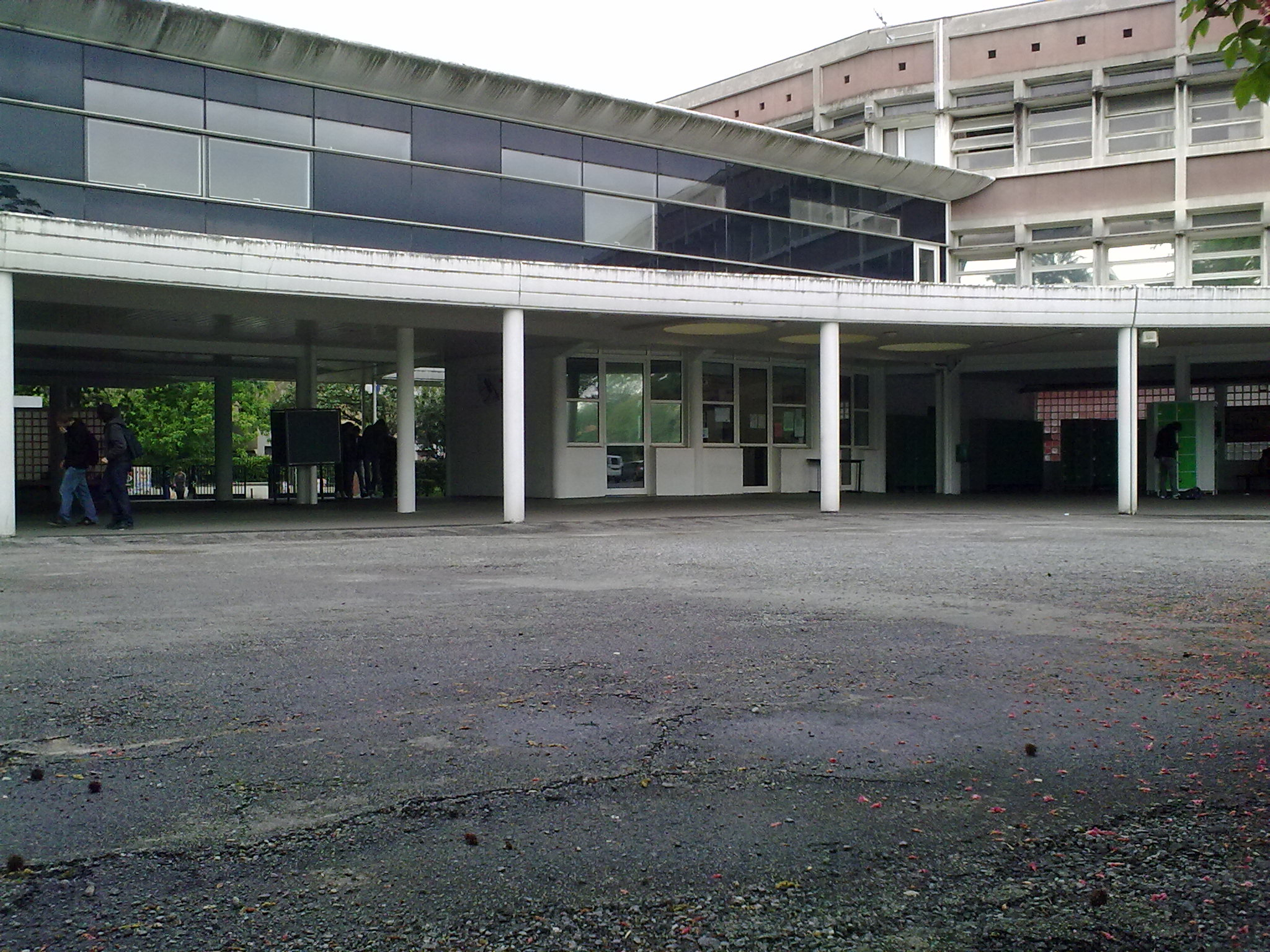
Vie Scolaire A of Saint - Cricq High School.

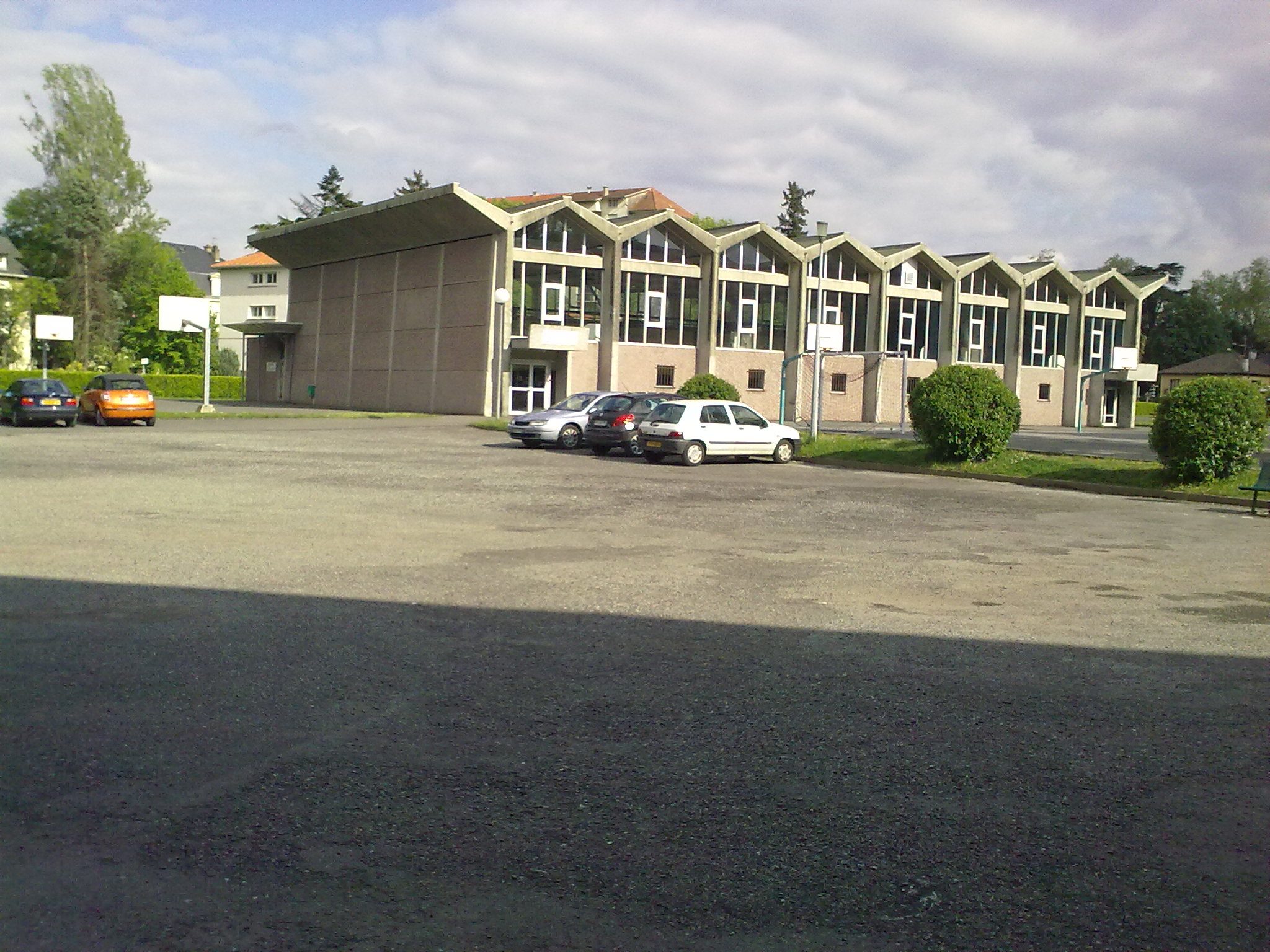
Gymnasium of Saint - Cricq High School.

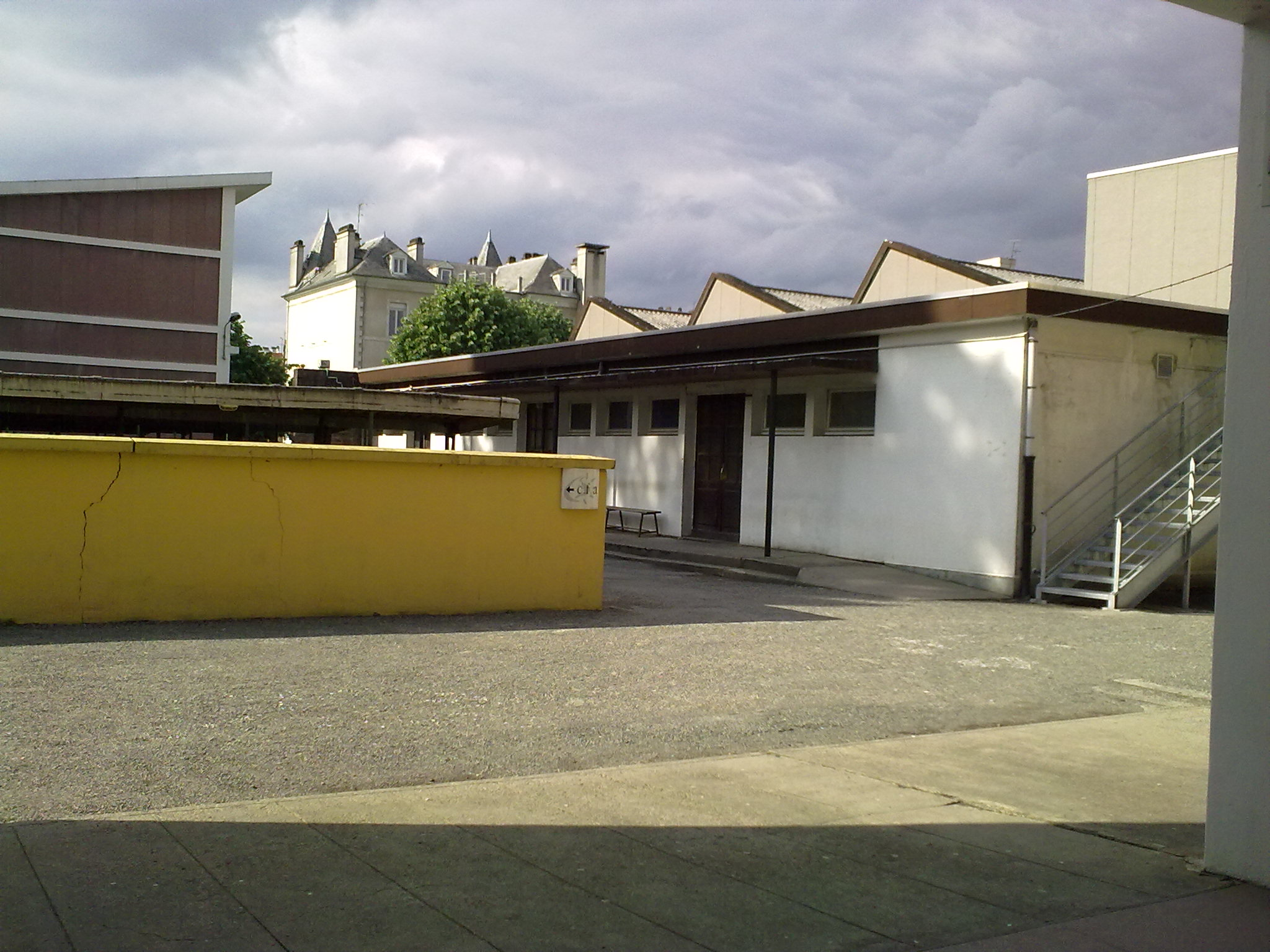
Building C of Saint - Cricq High School.

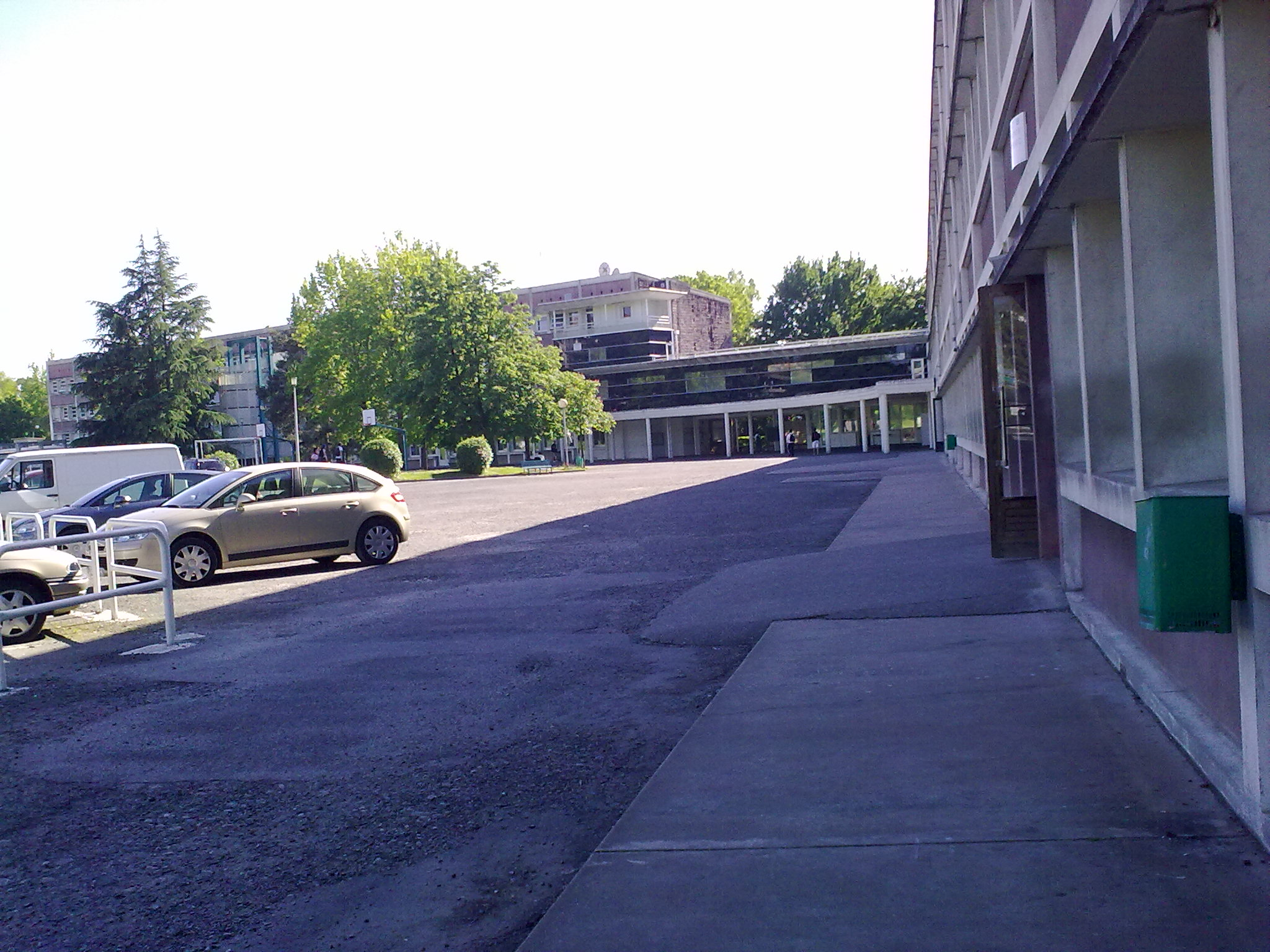
Saint-Cricq High School since the building B.

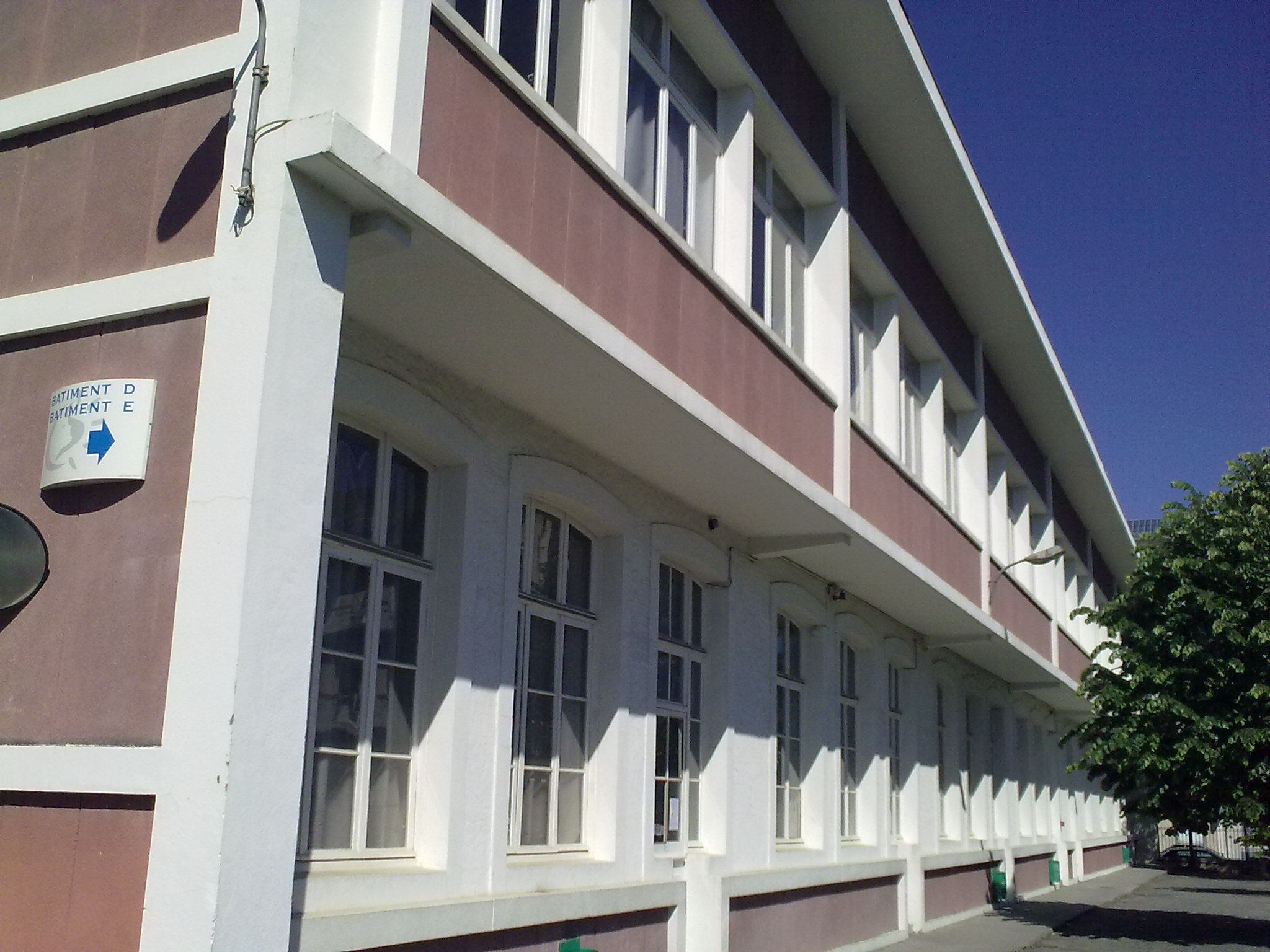
Saint-Cricq High School building D.

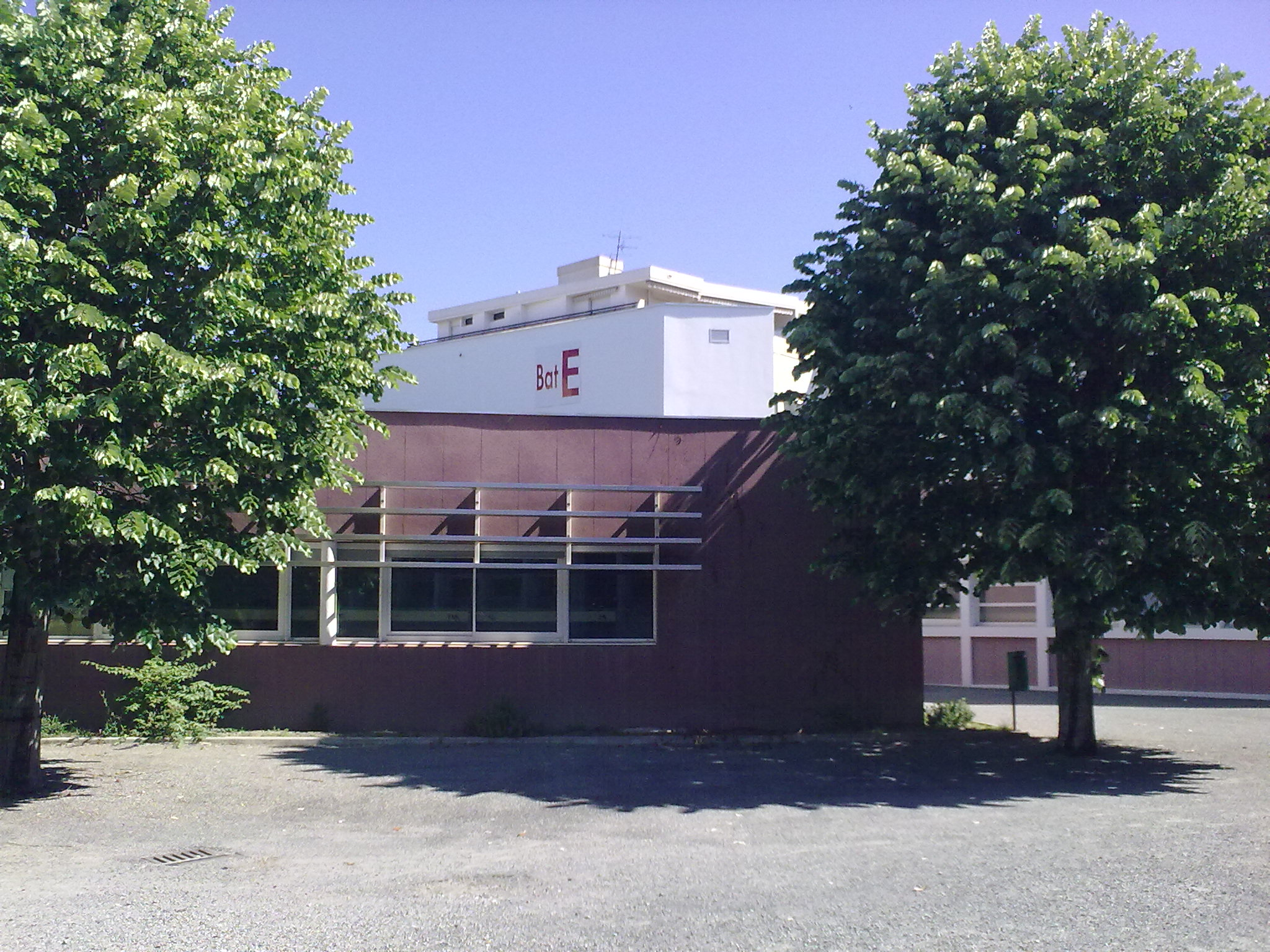
Saint-Cricq High School building E seen 1.

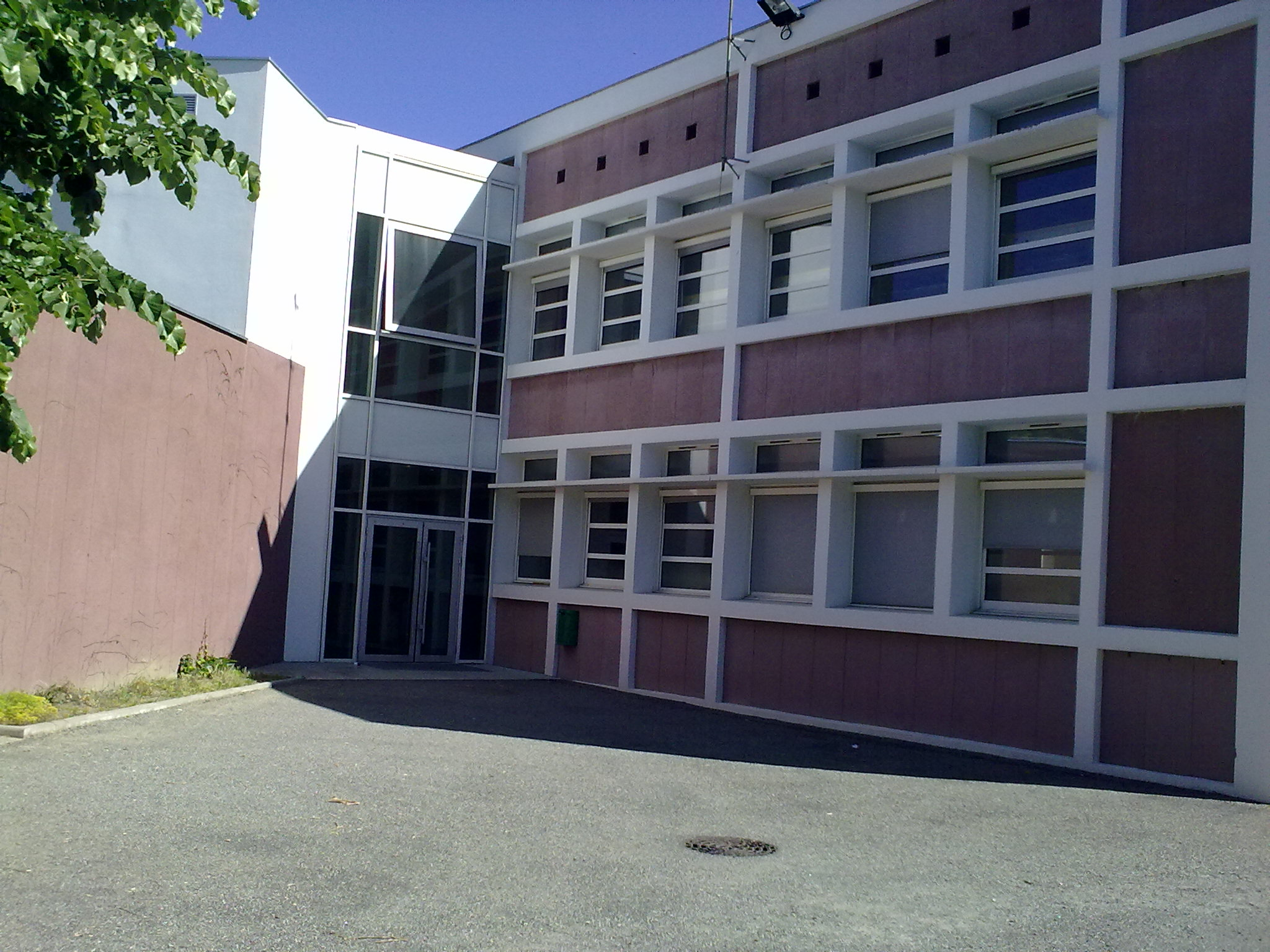
Saint-Cricq High School building E seen 2.

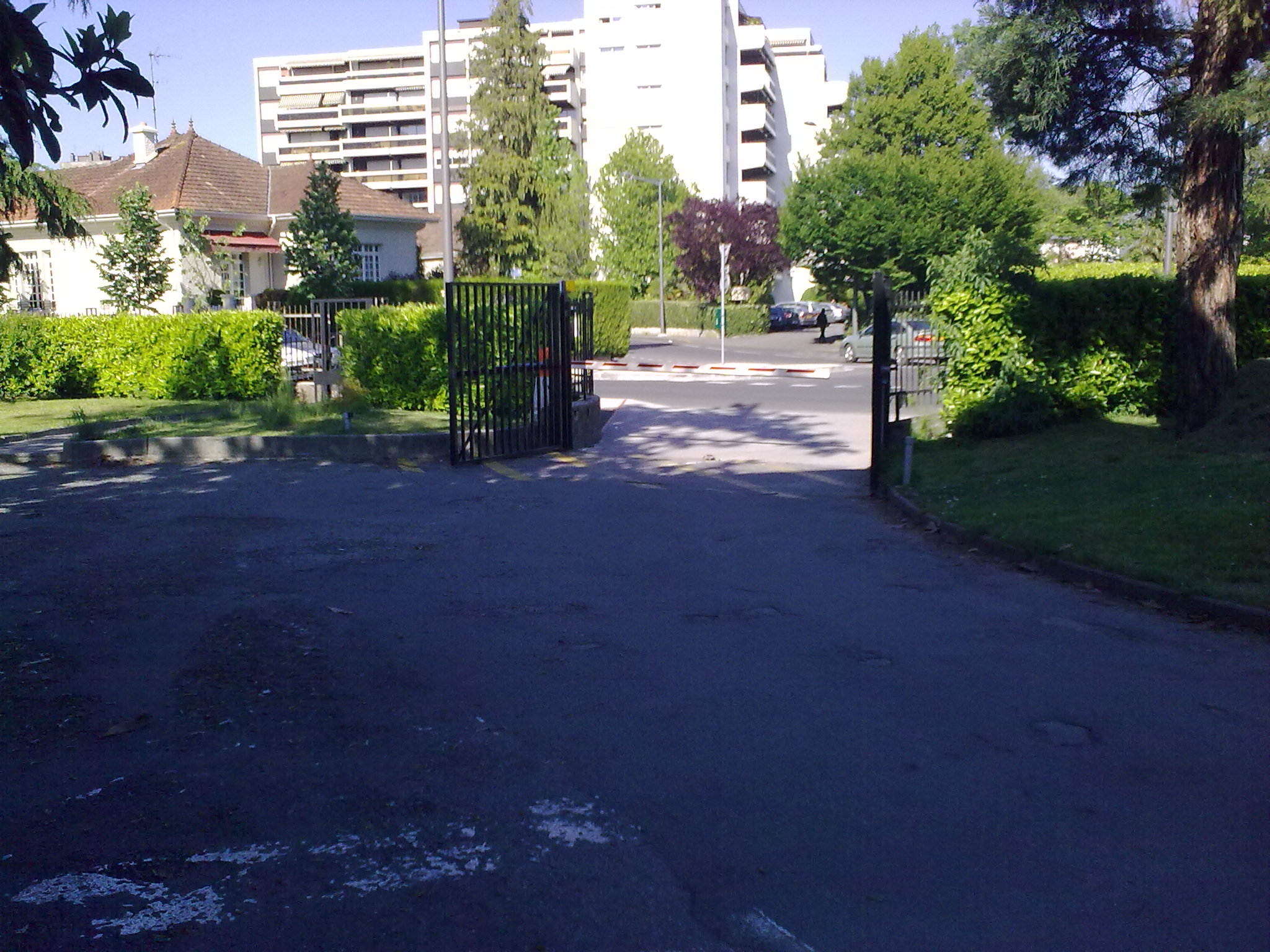
Saint-Cricq High School North exit.

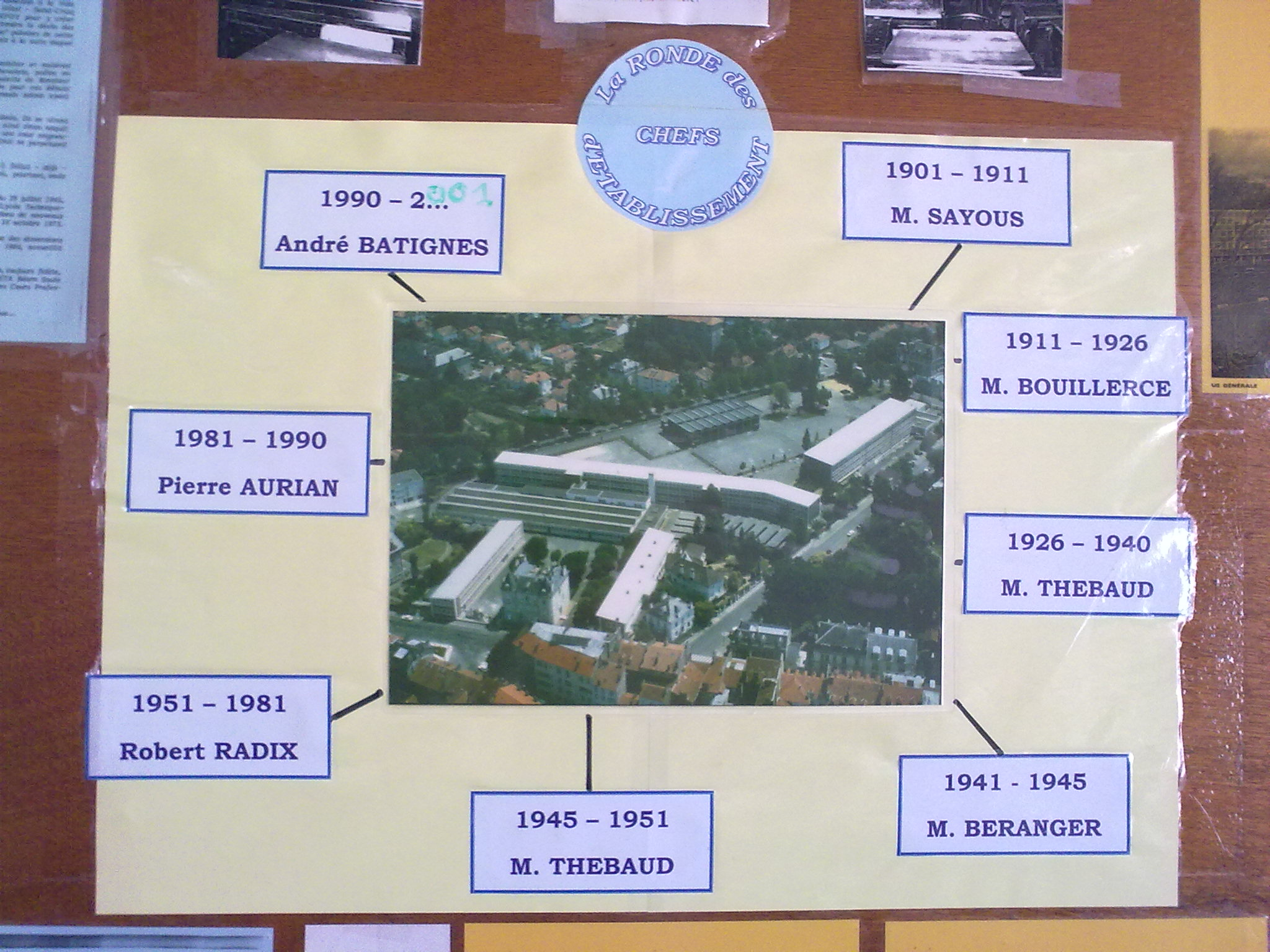
Saint-Cricq High School principals.

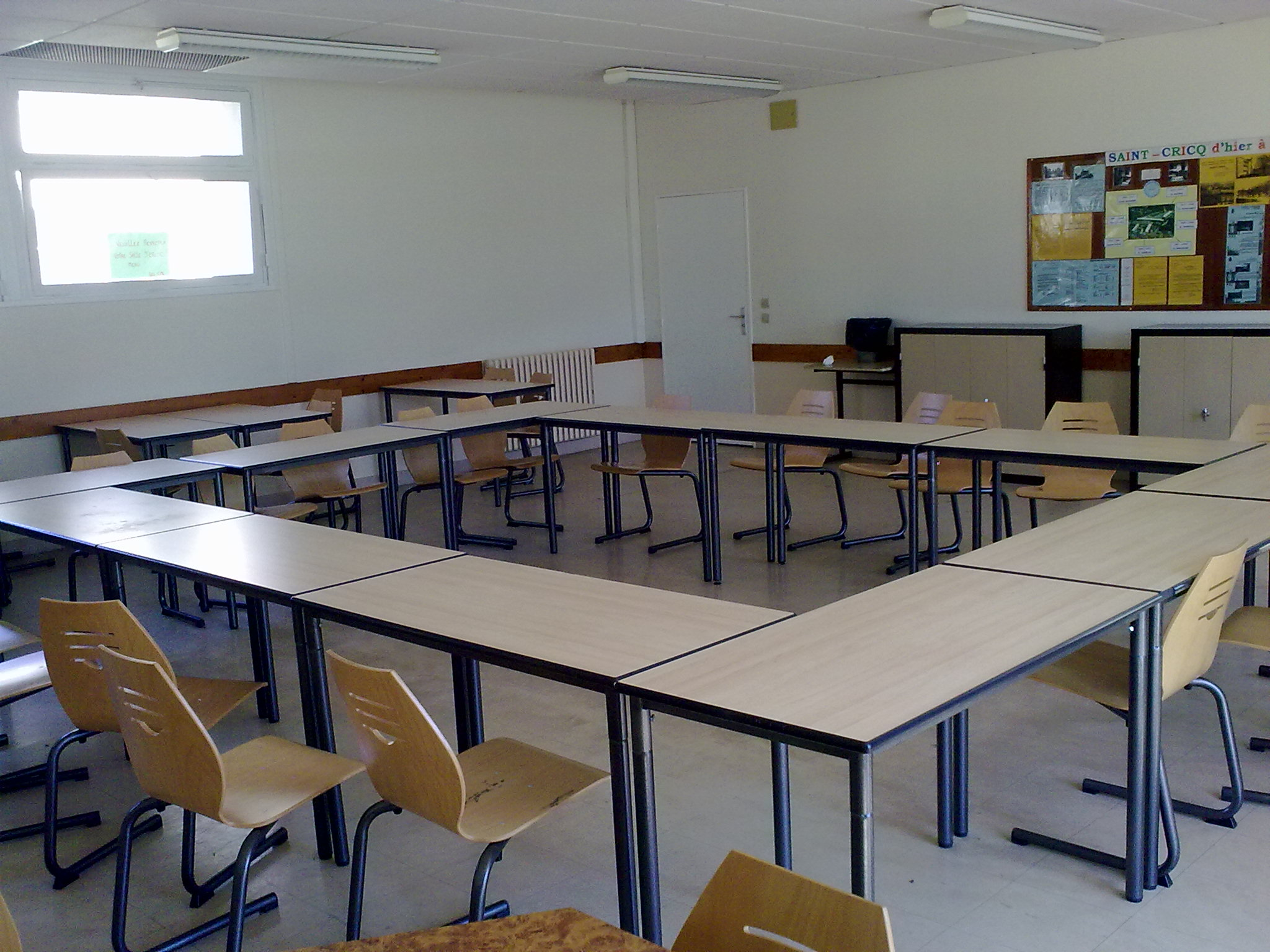
Saint-Cricq High School study room.

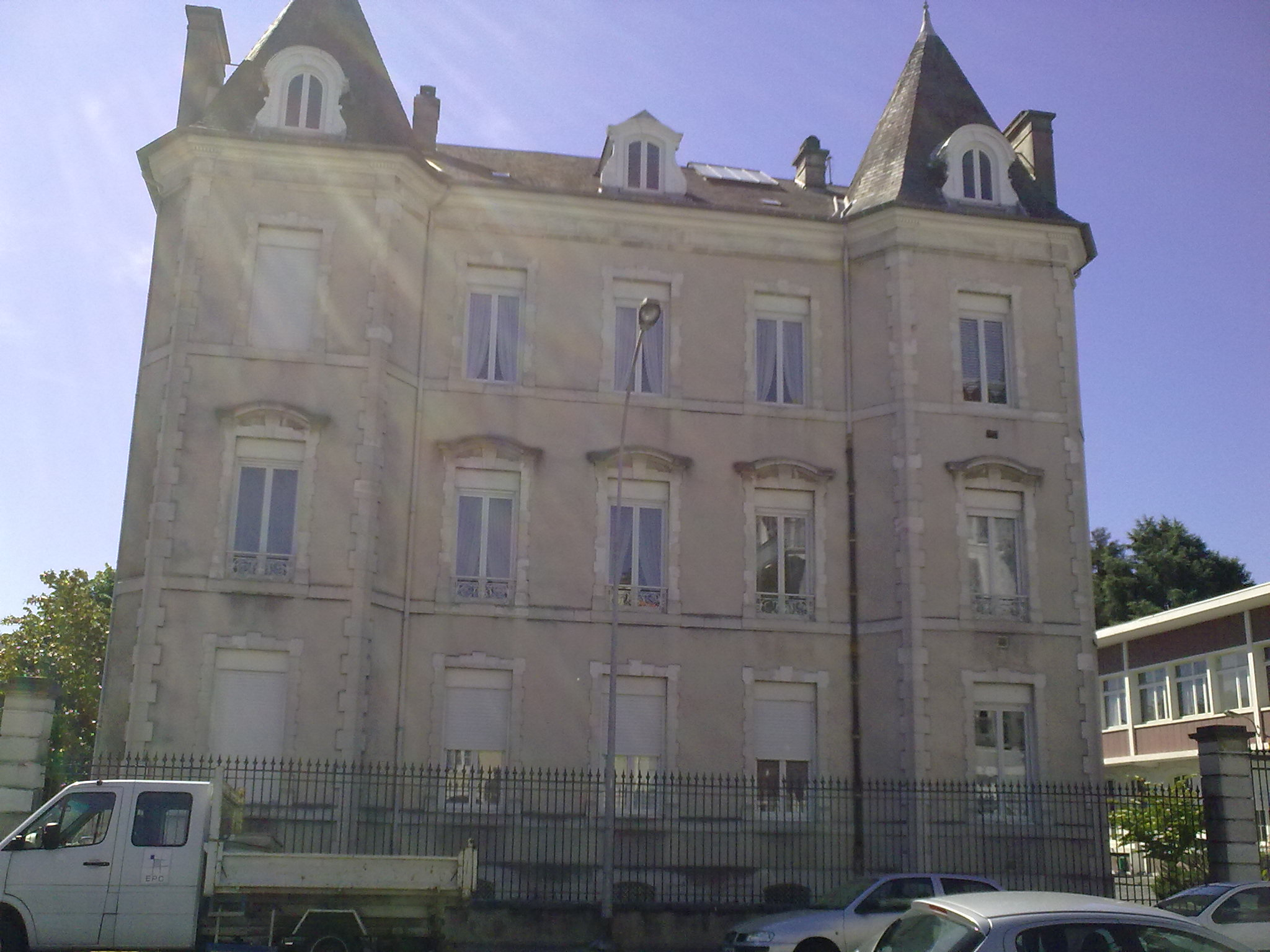
Saint-Cricq High School monument.
