= Cité Scolaire Internationale Europole =

French public secondary school

Coordinates: 45°11′42″N 5°42′42″E

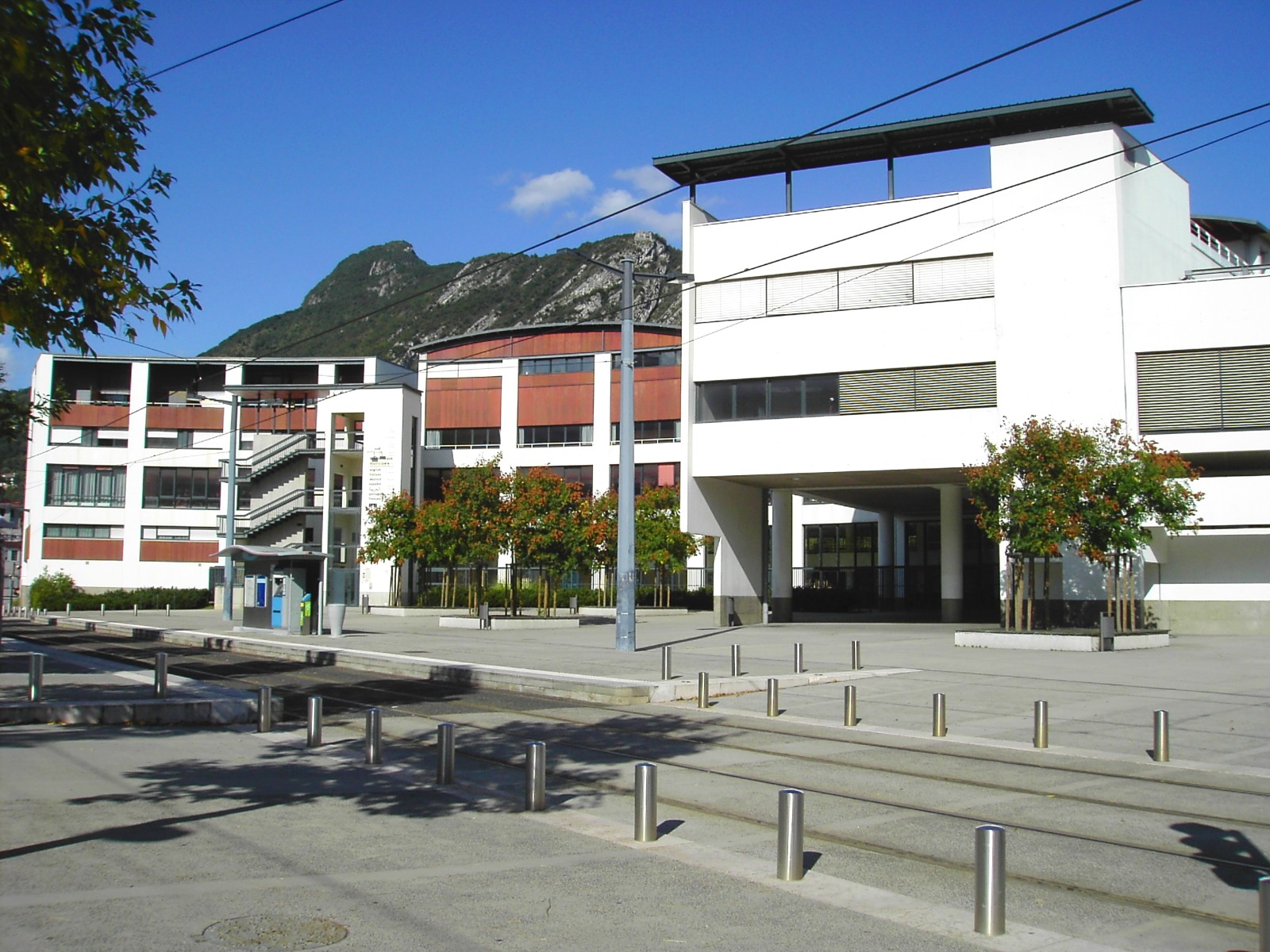
CSI Grenoble

CSI Grenoble (Cité Scolaire Internationale de Grenoble, also known as CSI-Europole, hereinafter "Europole"), is a French public secondary school that houses a collège (middle school) and lycée (high school) located in Grenoble, France, situated in close proximity to the Grenoble railway station (Gare de Grenoble) and the World Trade Center of Grenoble.

Although it has the word "international" in its name, it is not an international school per se; rather, it is a French school that offers a regular French curriculum taught in French, while also offering supplemental language and history curricula available in German, English, Italian, Spanish, Portuguese and Arabic. Its lycée (high school) has a consistently high pass rate for the French baccalaureate, due in part to its strict admissions procedures, including a rigorous language test conducted in either 6^{ème} for entry to collège, or 2nd for entry to lycée (sixth and tenth grades, respectively). Entry to other grades is possible, though only for children arriving in Grenoble during the summer, and once again a rigorous language test is used to evaluate pupils and to make selections where necessary.

The school was created as a response to the high influx of international residents to Grenoble and was originally located in several school facilities throughout the Grenoble area (for example, the English section was in the Lycée Stendhal). However, all language sections were moved by design to the new facility in the Europole neighborhood in the fall of 2001.

Europole provides an environment in which its students are able to receive an additional six to eight hours of intensive instruction in grammar, literature, and history in one of the above-mentioned languages, in addition to following a regular French secondary school education. Students have the possibility of graduating with a French OIB ("option internationale du baccalauréat") in any of the six languages offered. (The OIB is not the same as a regular international baccalaureate [IB] degree, but is rather a supplement to the regular French Baccalauréat, which Europole students can earn in Literature, Economics, or Science.) Some language sections also offer the possibility of receiving equivalent academic recognition from other countries, as for example, the German or the Italian sections. In addition to rigorous academics, Europole enjoys a copious number of partnerships with schools around the world with which it conducts exchanges, notably in Australia, Germany, the UK, and Spain.

The American School of Grenoble (formerly the Marshall McLuhan American School) is also housed at Europole, and allows short-stay Anglophone students (generally of American origin) to continue to follow many subjects, notably math and science, according to the same content and methodology as found in the United States. This section was closed at the end of the 2023-2024 school year.

== Languages in the International Sections (in alphabetical order) ==
- Arabic;
- English;
- German;
- Italian;
- Portuguese;
- Spanish;
- French.

== Admissions ==
Pupils already living in the Grenoble area are considered for admission to CSI at only two points: 6^{ème}, or 2nd. These are the first years of collège and lycée respectively. Entry is based on a dossier detailing the pupil's prior educational results, as well as on oral and written tests including tests in the language of the desired section. These entrance tests take place in May each year.

For those coming to Grenoble during the summer the situation is different. They can be considered for entry in their current year, to the extent that there are places available in the desired section. Once again entry is based on a dossier detailing the pupil's prior educational results, as well as on oral and written tests which may also include tests in French and Mathematics for those who have been schooled outside France for more than a year. These tests take place in September, as soon as school resumes after the summer break, with an extremely short schedule typically involving tests one day, results at the end of the following day, and first meetings at the school the day after that.

Note that a pupil in the collège at CSI is not guaranteed automatic entry to the lycée. All pupils in 3^{ème} wishing to continue to the lycée the following year are obliged to sit the same selection tests as those wishing to transfer to the lycée from other schools. Their level of competence in the language of their section is an important factor in this decision. In 2009 approximately 2/3 of the entrants to 2nd came from collège at CSI, while 1/3 of entrants were external candidates.

== See also ==
- List of international schools
