= Le Marais Sainte-Thérèse Professional School =

Location
- 48 Boulevard Thiers; Saint-Étienne, Auvergne-Rhône-Alpes, 42000; France; 45.4516°N 4.3898°E

Information
- Other name: Le Marais Sainte-Thérèse
- Type: Private secondary school and vocational training college
- Religious affiliation: Catholic
- Denomination: Jesuit
- Patron saint: St Thérèse
- Established: 1913; 113 years ago
- Founder: Fr Denis Jourjon, SJ
- Director: Bernard Lassabliere
- Gender: Co-educational
- Website: www.lycee-professionnel-centre-formation-lemarais-sainte-therese.fr

Le Marais Sainte-Thérèse Professional School is a private Catholic secondary school and vocational training college, located in Saint-Étienne, in the Auvergne-Rhône-Alpes region of France. The school was founded by the Society of Jesus in 1913.

Students may work toward a certificate of professional aptitude (CAP); a professional baccalaureate or a technical patent of trades (BTM).

== History ==
In 1913 Fr Denis Jourjon, SJ, created a learning and forgeing workshop, on what is the current site of the Le Marais Sainte-Thérèse high school. In 1960, the workshops were converted into a technical education college. Further developments resulted in the establishment on a training center in 1975, and subsequent developments included the introduction of electronics from 1979, mechanical production in 1987, metal fabrication in 1999, optics lunettary, micro-computing, and computer networking from 2003, dental prosthetics from 2005, industrial and home automated electronics from 2007, and further industrial workshops from 2009.

== See also ==
- Catholic Church in France
- Education in France
- List of Jesuit schools
