= Lycée Le Corbusier (Aubervilliers) =

Information
- Type: Public high school

Lycée Le Corbusier is a senior high school/sixth-form college in Aubervilliers, Seine-Saint-Denis, in the Paris metropolitan area.

In 2014 83% of the students passed the baccalaureate, while in 2015 this increased to 90%.
