= Lycée Carcado-Saisseval =

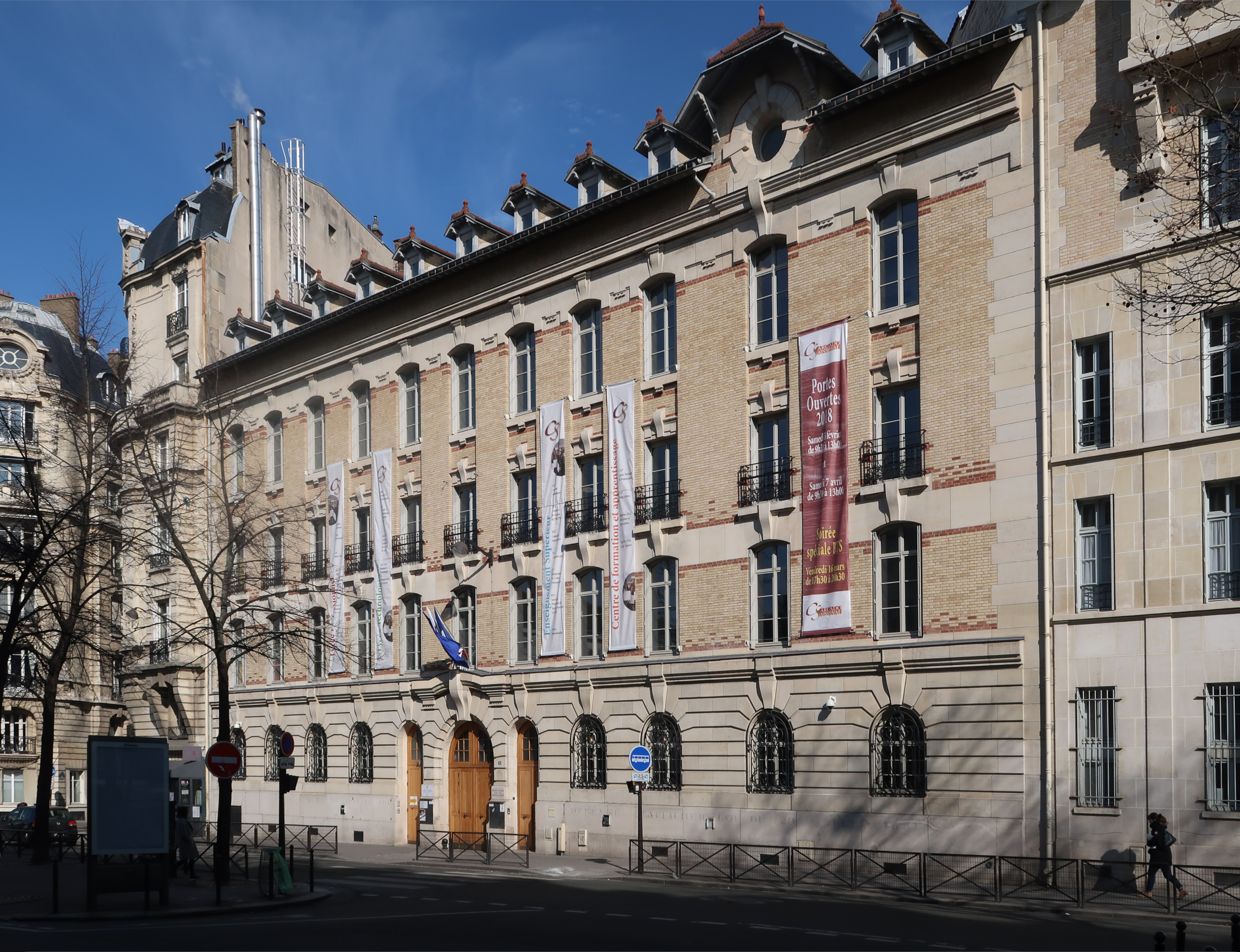

Location
- 121 boulevard Raspail; 75006 Paris; France
- Coordinates: 48.8454383°N 2.329000599999972°E

Information
- Principal: Vincent Eveno
- Website: carcado-saisseval.com

The lycée Carcado-Saisseval is a Catholic private school on the boulevard Raspail, in the 6th arrondissement of Paris, France.

== History ==
The lycée was formed from the Œuvre des enfants délaissés, an institution formed in 1803 by two widows, Mme de Carcado and Charlotte Hélène de Saisseval, who were both attached to Élisabeth of France, the sister of Louis XVI, and after the French Revolution to the Société du Cœur de Marie, a religious organization founded by Adélaïde-Marie Champion de Cicé. The school's aim was to provide education for children from all socioeconomic classes who had lost their parents during the French Revolution. Carcado died in 1807; by the time of Saisseval's death, in 1850, the institute had one hundred students enrolled.

== School ==
As of 2018, the lycée is one of 142 schools run by the Catholic church in Paris. It currently has (2016–2017) more than 1,400 students. It is a private school, which issues professional qualifications in the field of public health and commerce.

In 2005, the lycée was labelled by the Ministry of National Education (France) : "Lycée des Métiers des Activités Sanitaires et Sociales et des Activités Commerciales".

It issues a wide range of qualifications, including professional qualifications (bac pro, CAP) technological education (bac techno) and private qualifications (Brevet de technicien supérieur, licences pro).

The lycée is still under the tutelage of the Filles du Cœur de Marie, with a motherhouse located inside the premises.

== Ranking of the lycée ==
In 2015, the lycée was ranked 84th out of 109 at départemental level in terms of quality of teaching, and 1261th at national level. The ranking is based on three criteria: the bac results, the proportion of students achieving their baccalauréat who spent their last two years at the establishment, and added value (calculated by looking at the social origin of students, their age, and their diploma results). According to Le Figaro, in 2019, it ranked 49th out of 87 lycées in Paris, with a 97% graduation rate; in 2021, it ranked 65th, with a 98% graduation rate.
