= Ensemble Scolaire Saint Michel de Picpus =

Catholic school in Paris, France

Coordinates: 48.8424°N 2.3965°E

Ensemble Scolaire Saint Michel de Picpus is a Roman Catholic private school system in the Paris metropolitan area. It has a preschool/nursery (maternelle) and elementary school in the 12th arrondissement of Paris. It has two junior-senior high (collège-lycée) campuses: one in the 12th arrondissement of Paris and one in Saint-Mandé, Val-de-Marne.
