= Pontonniers International High School =

Pontonniers international High School
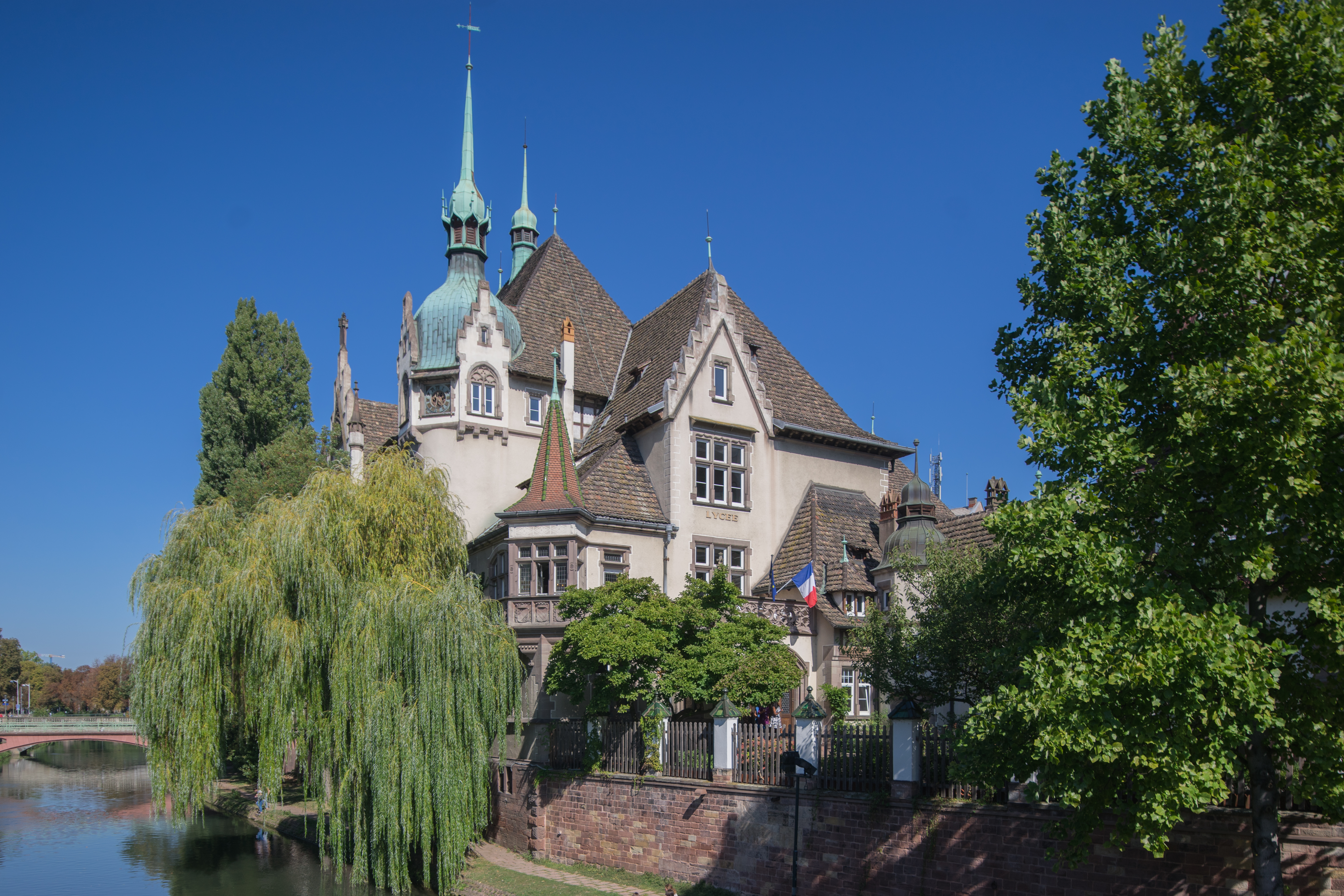
- View of the Pontonniers by the Ill river (2018)

Location
- Rue Pontonniers 1 Strasbourg, France
- 48°35′04″N 7°45′24″E

Information
- Website: lyc-sections-internationales-strasbourg.site.ac-strasbourg.fr

The Lycée International des Pontonniers (English: International Pontooner High School) is a French high school in Strasbourg, in the Bas-Rhin department of France. It is situated in the city's center, near the Strasbourg Cathedral.

The school hosts students from the 10th to 12th grades, and it is renowned for its scores in the Baccalauréat, the standardised final exams of the French high school diploma.

Pontonniers has a specific system that sets it apart from the other schools: the international sections. These were implemented to honor the European affinity of Strasbourg in a cultural and economic context. They also open doors to students as they might allow them to pursue a career in the many multinational corporations at work in that region. As of today, there are seven sections: English, German, Spanish, Italian, Polish, Russian and most recently, Portuguese.

Another unique aspect of the school is its building, built in 1902 by architect Johann Karl Ott. He chose to employ a historicist style, taking inspiration from Germanic architecture of the 15th and 16th centuries.

== History and construction ==
Before the school's construction, the grounds on which it was built served many purposes, mainly as a place for military barracks used by the French when they arrived in Strasbourg in 1681. Most famously, it housed the pontonnier regiment of general Eblé in 1789 during the revolution.

Founded in 1815 in Strasbourg, the Ecole supérieure de jeunes filles (Graduate school for young women) was a small building in the Andlau sector. Its goal was to give young girls and women a modern education, including a good knowledge of German and French.

After the fall of the First French Empire, the grounds were deserted for a long time. In 1871, when the Germans decided to make Strasbourg the capital of the Alsace–Lorraine region, they wanted to install a new educational system, in which they believed young francophone girls should be taught by nuns. Around that same time, the Ecole supérieure de jeunes filles became much too small for its students, which made finding a new building a necessity.

Settling on the deserted barrack grounds for its low price and good location, construction of the school in its present form started, and was completed just in time for the beginning of the 1902 term. It was called Höhere Mädchenschule until 1918 when it became Lycée de jeunes filles. It only became the Lycée international des Pontonniers (Pontonniers international high school) in 1975, having opened their doors to male students in 1973 with the temporary name Lycée classique et moderne d’Etat Mixte.

== Description of the school ==
The old part of the school is composed of three separate buildings. The first one is L-shaped and is closest to the Ill river. It faces the Katzeroller house, which serves as an accommodation for the school's principal. Another house for the vice-principal sits right next to it.

Right by the professor's entrance which was previously decorated with two owl statues (the mascots of the school), as well as the emblems of the city and the regions of Alsace and Lorraine, the principal's house is adorned with two sculpted medallions, which represent Fröbel and Pestalozzi, two Germanic educators of the 17th century.

The teacher's entrance leads through the concierge's antechamber, where students must report to in case of tardiness. The room is decorated with stained glass panels, typical for the Alsaciatian region.

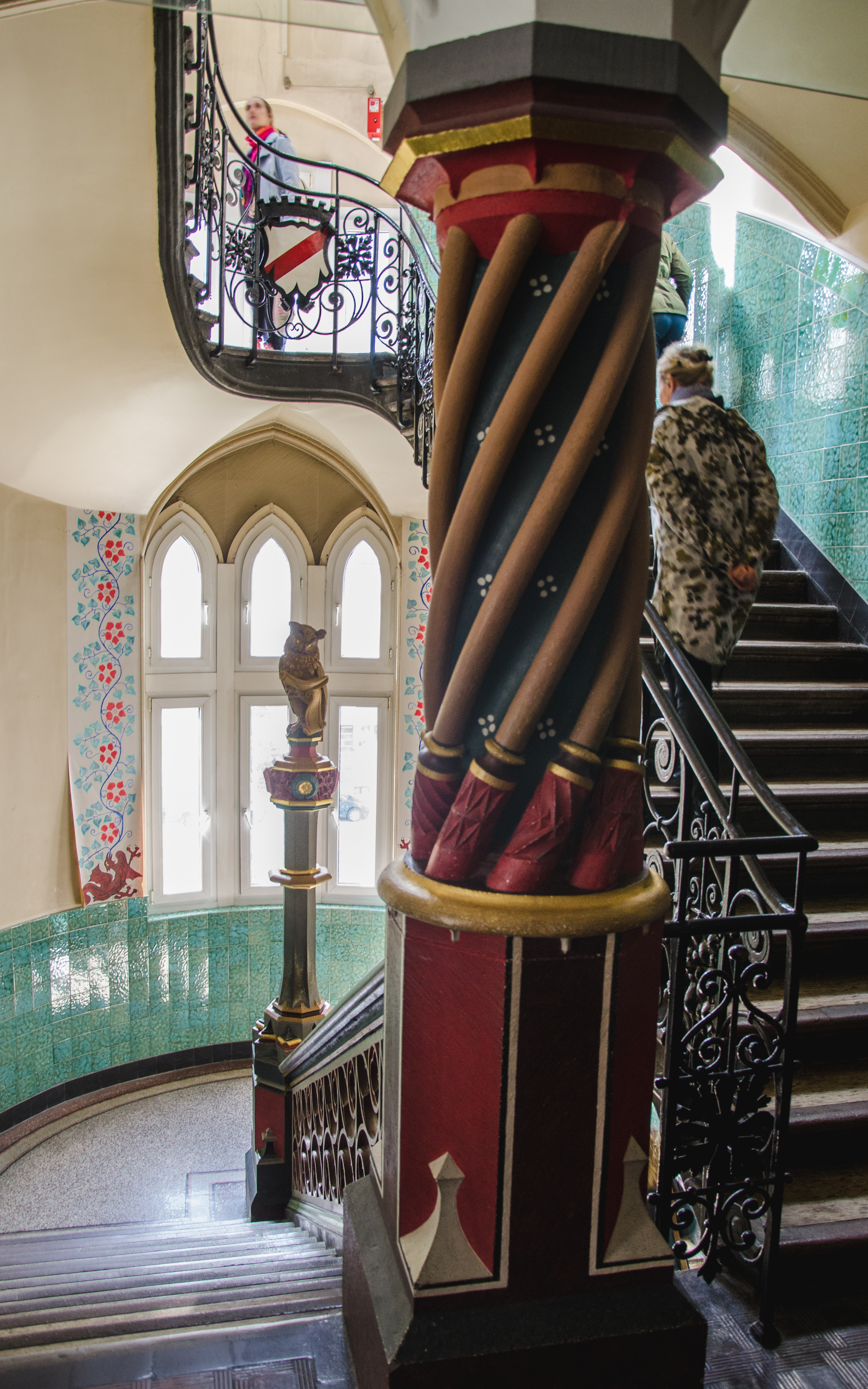
Teacher's staircase

As for the interior, each floor has a different paneling with either an eagle, a lion or a fish on the tiles. The hallways are richly decorated, a crest above each door indicating which purpose said room served (an instrument for a music classroom, for example).

The main building has two staircases. In older times, one was exclusively used by teachers and the other by students. The teacher staircase is sculpted out of stone, while the student staircase is made of metal, shaped into intricate designs. Nowadays, anyone may access the upper floors through whichever staircase they wish.

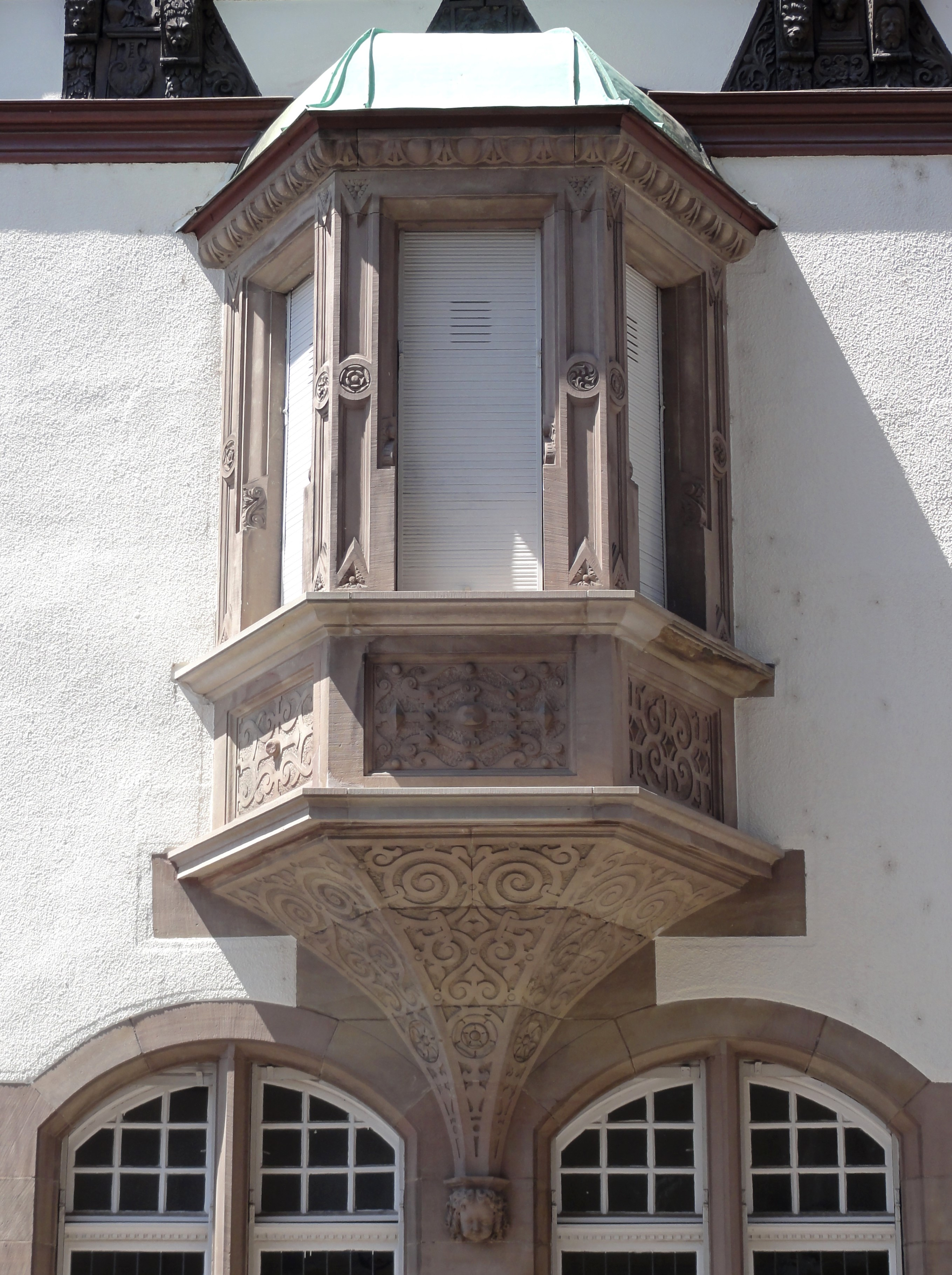
Oriel Window of the teachers lounge

The teachers' lounge and one of the libraries can be found on the first floor, along with many classrooms, usually used for language courses. One architectural specialty of the teachers' lounge are the oriel windows, with a view on Pontonnier street. The first floor library was decorated in a neo gothic style and is nowadays rarely used by students. It rather serves as a storage room for old keepsakes, such as maps from the 1900s or old valuable books.

The second floor also houses many classrooms, the principal's office and an old clock built by the Ungerer company, who were also in charge of the astronomical clock in the cathedral of strasbourg. The clock has been considered a historical monument (monument historique) since 13 November 2003.

The entire school has been considered a historical monument since 5 April 2002 and thus benefits from the national heritage protection.

When the school was built, the third and final floor was one big space serving as a music room. Nowadays it houses multiple classrooms, usually used for science oriented classes.

== Foreign students ==
The school facilitates the admittance of foreign students with its module for people with no knowledge of French, as well as the seconde FLE (seconde is the equivalent of 10th grade, class for French as a Foreign Language). FLE is for students who have some French skills and gives them an aid while still allowing them to follow a classical 10th grade curriculum.

== The international sections ==
The school has a total of seven “national” sections. The biggest ones being the English section, along with the German and Russian ones. The Spanish, Italian, Polish and Portuguese sections, while smaller, prepare their students for equivalents of their countries high school graduation exams.

The different sections are:

- the Anglophone section
- the German section (Abibac module has been moved to the Lycée Fustel de Coulanges (since September 2019) and OIB)
- the Italian section
- the Spanish section
- the Polish section
- the Russian section
- the Portuguese section, since September 2023

== International exams ==
International Schools offer traditional French exams to all of their students. For those who may want to better their linguistic skills, a series of either French or foreign exams (that are recognized in France as well as the country whose language is chosen) are also offered.

Thus, students in international sections often pass their international Brevet (equivalent to GCSE) and then, if they wish to, they may pass the Baccalauréat exams with an international option (called OIB) as well. The syllabus contains all the same courses as the regular French one, but with added classes on literature and history of the sections’ respective countries.
