= International Bilingual School of Provence =

Location
- Luynes, Aix-en-Provence; France; 43.4758°N 5.4216°E

Information
- Type: Private day and boarding school
- Established: 1996
- School district: Independent
- Head of school: Jean-Marc GOBBI
- Enrollment: 1,000
- Newspaper: IBS News
- Website: www.ibsofprovence.fr www.ibsofprovence.com/en www.ibsofprovence-camps.com

The International Bilingual School of Provence (founded in 1996) is a mixed day and boarding school situated in Luynes on the outskirts of Aix-en-Provence in the south of France. With over 1,000 students, more than 75 different nationalities, students from 2 to 18 years old learn in a multilingual environment. The school is an International Baccalaureate accredited school and also offers the traditional French curriculum as well as the IGCSEs from Cambridge and the International Baccalaureate Diploma Programme (IBDP) .

IBS of Provence also provides boarding options for students from 6ème (6th grade) onwards. Additionally, the school organizes spring and summer camps, and also features a sports studies section, enabling students to pursue their athletic passions alongside their academic goals.
