= Lycée Raspail =

Location
- 5 bis avenue Maurice d'Ocagne, Paris; France
- Coordinates: 48.825334°N 2.310857°E

Information
- Website: www.ldmraspail.fr

The lycée Raspail is a public lycée located in the 14th arrondissement of Paris. It is a general technological and professional lycée which is known as a trade Lycée "of energy and the environment". It offers courses from second year and licences to pass the general bac, the professional bac, preparatory classes (classe préparatoire aux grandes écoles PCSI/PSI, PTSI/PT, TSI) and BTS FED, MS, ET, TC; it also offers around 150 apprenticeships with 5 CFA and more than a hundred adults studying the GRETA GPI2D to prepare for different professional bacs, BTS and licences.

== CPGE rankings ==
The national ranking of preparatory classes to grandes écoles is the rate of admission of students to the grandes écoles.

In 2015, L'Étudiant gave the following rankings for 2014 :

Stream	Students admitted to a grande école^{*}	Admission rate^{*}	Average rate over 5 years	National ranking	Year-on-year comparison
PSI / PSI*	38 / 38 students	100%	95%	32ndex-æquo out of 120	▼0
PT / PT*	90 / 91 students	98%	95%	14thex-æquo out of 62	▼0
Source : Classement 2015 des prépas - L'Étudiant (Concours de 2014). * the admission rate depends upon the grandes écoles included in the study. In the scientific stream, this is a group of 11 to 17 engineering schools which were selected by L'Étudiant for the stream (MP, PC, PSI, PT or BCPST).
