= Union chrétienne de Saint-Chaumond (Poitiers) =

Union chrétienne de Saint-Chaumond is a private Catholic school in Poitiers, France. It serves levels maternelle (preschool) through lycée (senior high school/sixth form college).

Its primary school facilities are coeducational. Levels maternelle through CE2 attend the Ecole Sainte Marie building while CM1 and CM2 attend Ecole Union-Chrétienne. The collège (middle/junior high school) classes are gender-separated. The lycée is coeducational.

It includes boarding facilities for girls from primary CM2 through all levels of collège and lycée.

It was founded in 1652 by Vincent de Paul and Madame de Pollalion.
