= Lycée Saint-Joseph of Avignon =

Location
- Rue des Lices; Avignon, Vaucluse, Provence-Alpes-Côte d'Azur; France; 43°56′43″N 4°48′39″E

Information
- Type: Private secondary school
- Religious affiliation: Catholicism
- Denomination: Jesuit
- Patron saint: Saint Joseph
- Established: 1850; 176 years ago
- Gender: Co-educational
- Affiliations: Archdiocese of Avignon
- Website: www.stjoavignon.com

Lycée Saint-Joseph of Avignon is a private Catholic secondary school located in the city of Avignon, Vaucluse, in the Provence-Alpes-Côte d'Azur, France. Founded in 1850 by the Society of Jesus, the school educates high-school students and post-baccalauréat students, in particular through a preparatory class for the grandes écoles.

== Notable alumni ==
- Isidore Méritan (1862-1928), politician and lawyer, deputy of Vaucluse

== See also ==
- Catholic Church in France
- Education in France
- List of Jesuit schools
