= École et Collège Saint-Mauront =

Private Catholic school in Marseille, France

Coordinates: 43.318°N 5.375°E

Information
- Religious affiliation(s): Catholicism
- Established: 1905; 120 years ago
- Website: stmauront.fr

Ecole et Collège Saint-Mauront is a private Catholic primary and junior high school in the 3rd arrondissement, Marseille, France. It is under the jurisdiction of the Diocese of Marseille.

== History ==
The school opened in a former soap factory in 1905. Initially its student body was majority ethnic French, Italians, and Portuguese in the period prior to 1938. Beginning in the 1960s children from former colonies in sub-Saharan Africa enrolled.

== Demographics ==
As of 2011 the school had 117 students, with 85-90% of recent immigrant origin. Katrin Bennhold of The New York Times stated in 2008 that few of the students were white.

As of 2011, the majority of the students were Muslim.

In 2011 the school had 17 teachers.

== Curriculum ==
In order to discourage students from going to Quranic classes held in mosques, the school offers optional Arabic courses; it has done so since circa 2006.

The school teaches evolution; in 2008 headmaster Jean Chamoux stated that some Muslim students try to refute the teaching of evolution.
