= Collège-Lycée La Réussite =

Islamic school in Paris, France

Coordinates: 48.91559°N 2.37514°E

Information
- Type: Public high school

Collége-Lycée Privé La Reussite is an Islamic junior and senior high school/high school and sixth-form college in Aubervilliers, Seine-Saint-Denis, France, in the Paris metropolitan area.

It was first established in 2001. In 2006 it asked the Académie of Créteil to be granted a contract with the government so it could receive state funding.
