= Lycée Stendhal =

School in Grenoble, France

Coordinates: 45°11′22″N 5°43′48″E

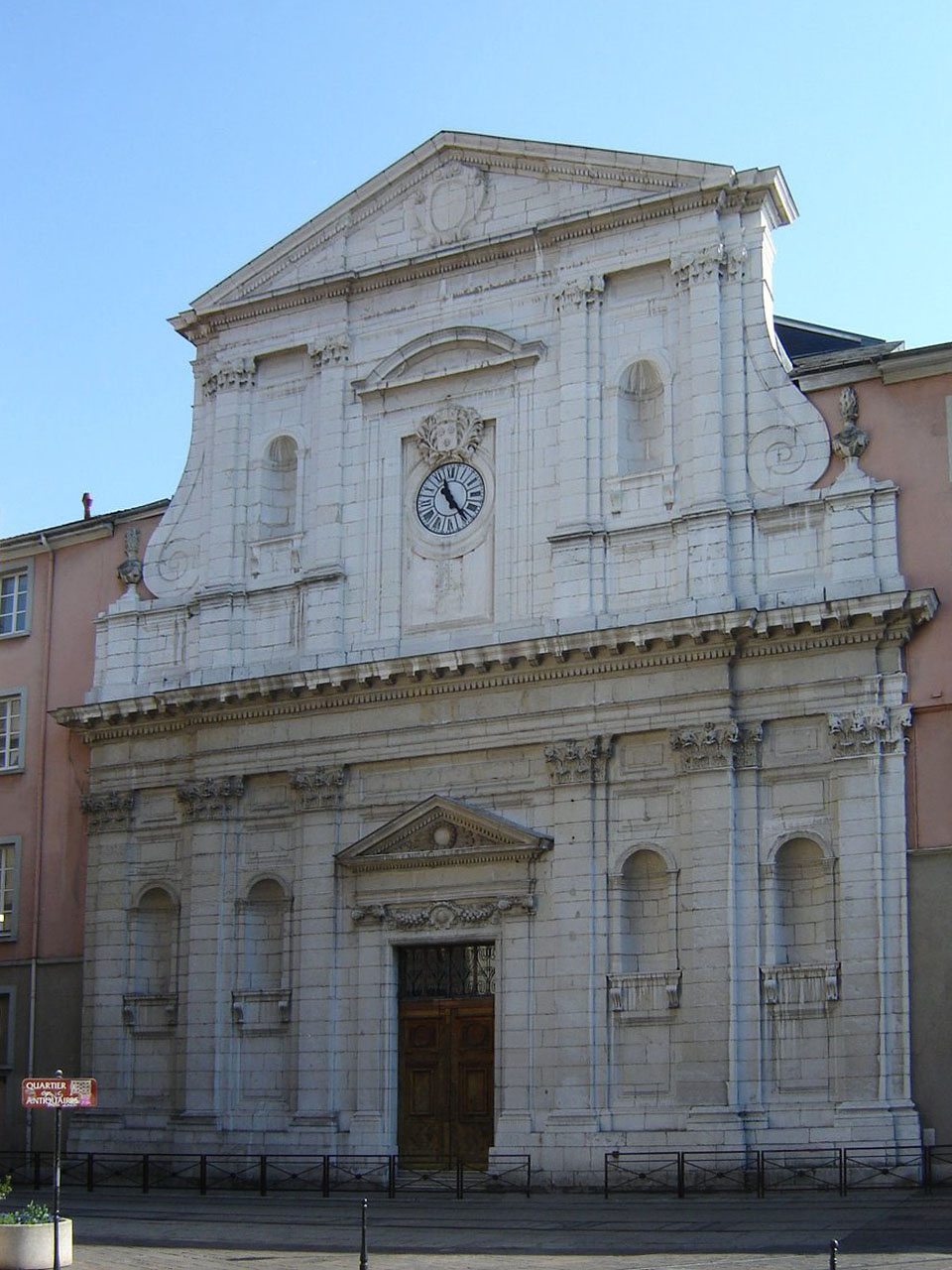
Lycee Stendhal

The lycée Stendhal, formerly Cité scolaire Stendhal, is a secondary and higher education establishment in Grenoble. It is the oldest lycée in Grenoble, and its pupils have included Stendhal (after whom it is now named) and Champollion. It is located at 1 bis, place Jean-Achard.

== History ==
It was founded as a Jesuit college in 1651, and still has a chapel and an astronomical and astrological sundial dating to 1673. In 1987, an international section was added, which has since relocated to the Cité Scolaire Internationale de Grenoble (CSI Europole).

== See also ==
- List of Jesuit sites
