= Colegio Español Federico García Lorca =

Spanish government-operated school in France

Coordinates: 48.862°N 2.275°E

The Colegio Español Federico García Lorca (French: Ecole Espagnole "Federico García Lorca") is a Spanish government-operated school for children from 3 to 12 years old in Paris, France, that teaches in Spanish language, French language and English language. It is located at 53 Rue de la Pompe in the 16th arrondissement. It is affiliated to the institute Liceo Español Luis Buñuel, in the Paris area.

The school welcomes students from all walks of life but most of them are the children of diplomats, businessmen or public figures who want to maintain their privacy, which sometimes makes it the target of criticism.

== Origins ==
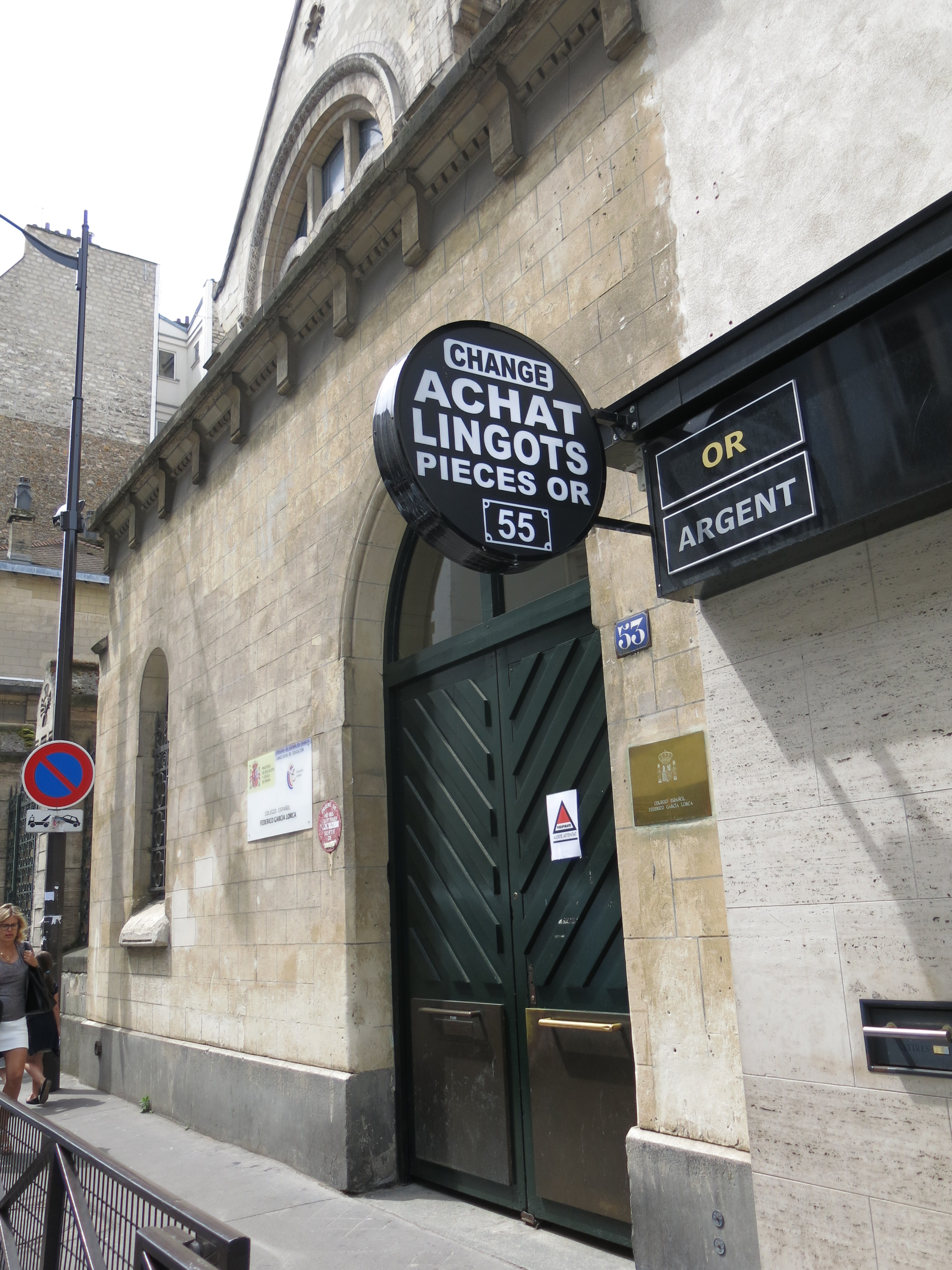

By the late 1960s, Spanish migrant families in France began to shift their priorities, focusing increasingly on their children’s education and cultural preservation. This concern was particularly visible among the parents attending the Spanish Catholic Mission on Rue de la Pompe, as well as within secular Spanish cultural associations. Ensuring the transmission of the Spanish language and culture to their children became a key objective.

In 1968, a grassroots movement of Spanish emigrant parents emerged to demand that the Spanish government provide structured Spanish-language education led by qualified instructors. The Spanish Mission supported this initiative, and soon parents began organizing their own Spanish classes within the Mission’s premises. By 1969, these volunteer-run classes welcomed 70 to 80 students each week, for two to three hours per session.

To maintain the Spanish cultural identity of children enrolled in the French school system, complementary classes in Spanish language and culture were formally launched in 1970. Initially functioning without official recognition from either the French or Spanish governments, the initiative expanded to include a preschool, a primary school, and eventually higher levels of education — all housed in the Spanish Catholic Mission.

In response to growing parental pressure, the Spanish government proposed the creation of a bilingual secondary school. However, the idea was rejected by families who feared such an institution would primarily serve the children of elites, such as diplomats and executives. Instead, families advocated for a primary school model aligned with the Spanish curriculum, allowing children to reintegrate into the Spanish school system should they return to Spain.

A turning point came in 1974 when the school was officially integrated into the Spanish educational administration through a ministerial decree, becoming independent from the Spanish Catholic Mission. The government converted the church cloister at 51 Rue de la Pompe into classrooms, eventually accommodating nearly 500 students between the ages of 6 and 15.

Today, the school operates fully under the Spanish Ministry of Education. Teachers are recruited in Spain, and both the curriculum and textbooks match those used in Spanish schools. Most students are Spanish nationals, although there are also some from Latin America.

After completing the eighth year of schooling (equivalent to the French quatrième), most students continue at the Liceo Español in Neuilly to pursue their Spanish high school diploma (bachillerato). Others may choose to enter the French school system.

The teaching approach is intercultural: Spanish and French are taught at all levels, and English instruction begins in the third year of primary school. By the end of their schooling, students are expected to be fully proficient in both Spanish and French, with a foundation in English.

The school also provides daily services such as a canteen for both students and staff, and a well-equipped, though modestly sized, gymnasium for physical education classes.

== Internal operations ==
Admission to Federico Garcia Lorca is by special procedure. An interview takes place between the parents of the pupil concerned, the child and the director. Following the interview, a classification is established on a list. If the child is below the established threshold, he/she is admitted to the school. Sometimes, when families apply for two children, one gets in and the other doesn't, and the school is sometimes criticized for this. However, according to some families, it's this selection threshold that gives the school its reputation, which counterbalances the criticism. As of today, the institution has a total enrollment of 211 students, including 139 of Spanish nationality and 72 from other backgrounds. The teaching staff comprises 17 educators, among whom are native Spanish speakers as well as both tenured and interim public teachers.

== Address ==
- 53, rue de la Pompe. 75116 París
