= Agricultural school of Cibeins =

Education institution in Ain, France

Coordinates: 45°59′2.64″N 4°48′15.54″E

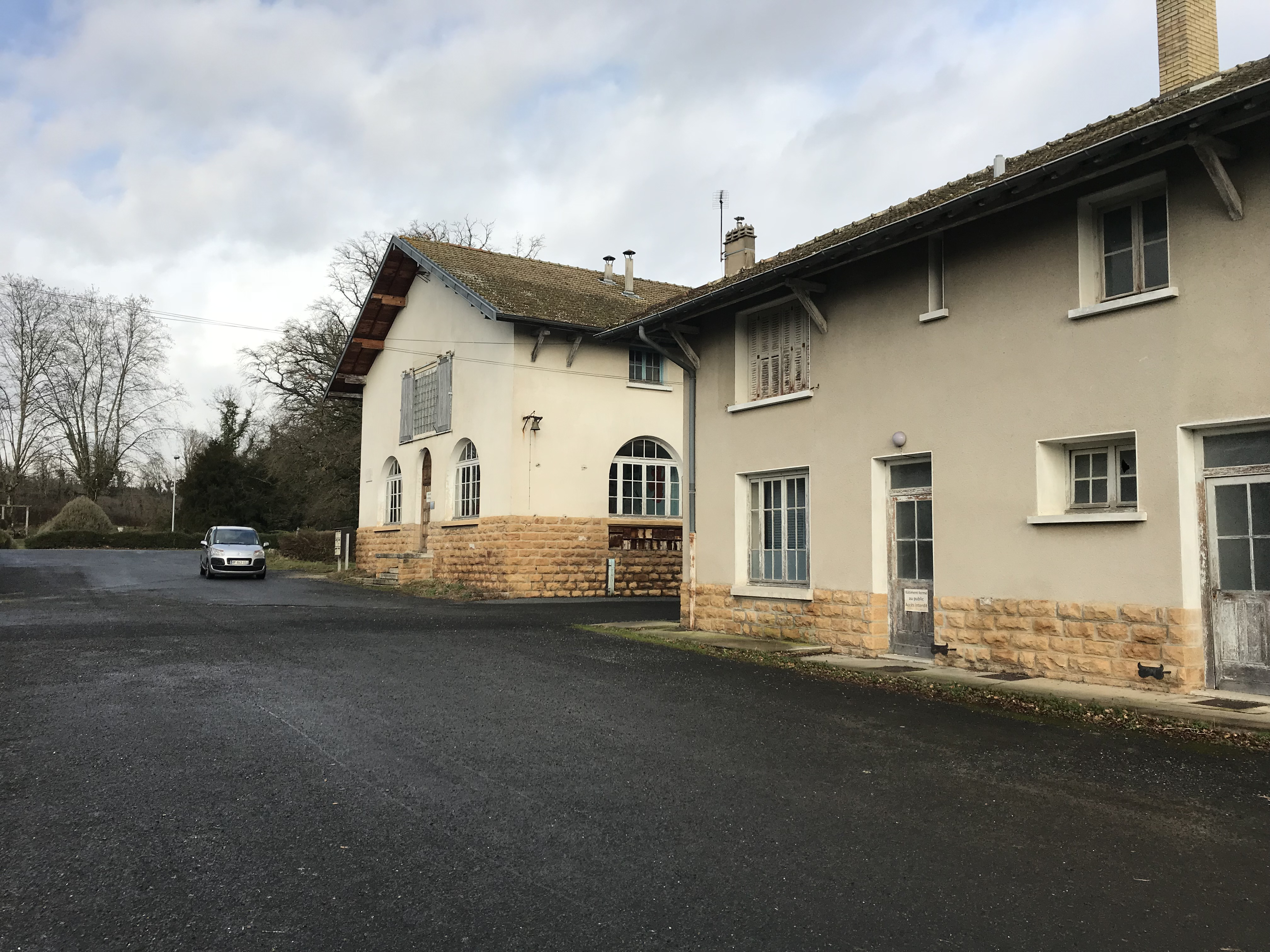

Information
- Type: Institut d'agronomie

École d’agriculture de Cibeins is a domain dedicated to agricultural education located in Cibeins, in the municipality of Misérieux in Ain, France.

== History ==
The domain has been mentioned since 1097. In 1386, the Cholier family built a fortified house on the domain.

The Château de Cibeins was constructed starting from 1707. In 1717, Pierre Cholier built the chapel on the domain.

=== Agricultural education ===
In the 1910s the mayor of Lyon, Édouard Herriot, had the city of Lyon purchase the Cibeins domain to establish an agricultural school and transfer certain agricultural facilities such as the Vacherie du Parc.

From 1919 to 1927 the farm school was built by Charles Meysson.

As of 2017 the place is still dedicated to agricultural education and houses the Cibeins Agricultural High School (EPLEFPA). It is sometimes referred to as the Édouard-Herriot High School.

== Bibliography ==
- Cibeins 1918–2018: de l'école municipale d'agriculture au lycée agricole Édouard Herriot, éditions du Poutan, ISBN 978-2-37553-024-5
