= Lycée Condorcet (Montreuil, Seine-Saint-Denis) =

Coordinates: 48.8582°N 2.4456°E

Information
- Type: Public high school

Lycée Condorcet is a sixth-form college/senior high school in Montreuil, Seine-Saint-Denis, France in the Paris metropolitan area.
