= Lycée International Montebello =

Senior high school in Lille, France

Coordinates: 50.6196°N 3.0479°E

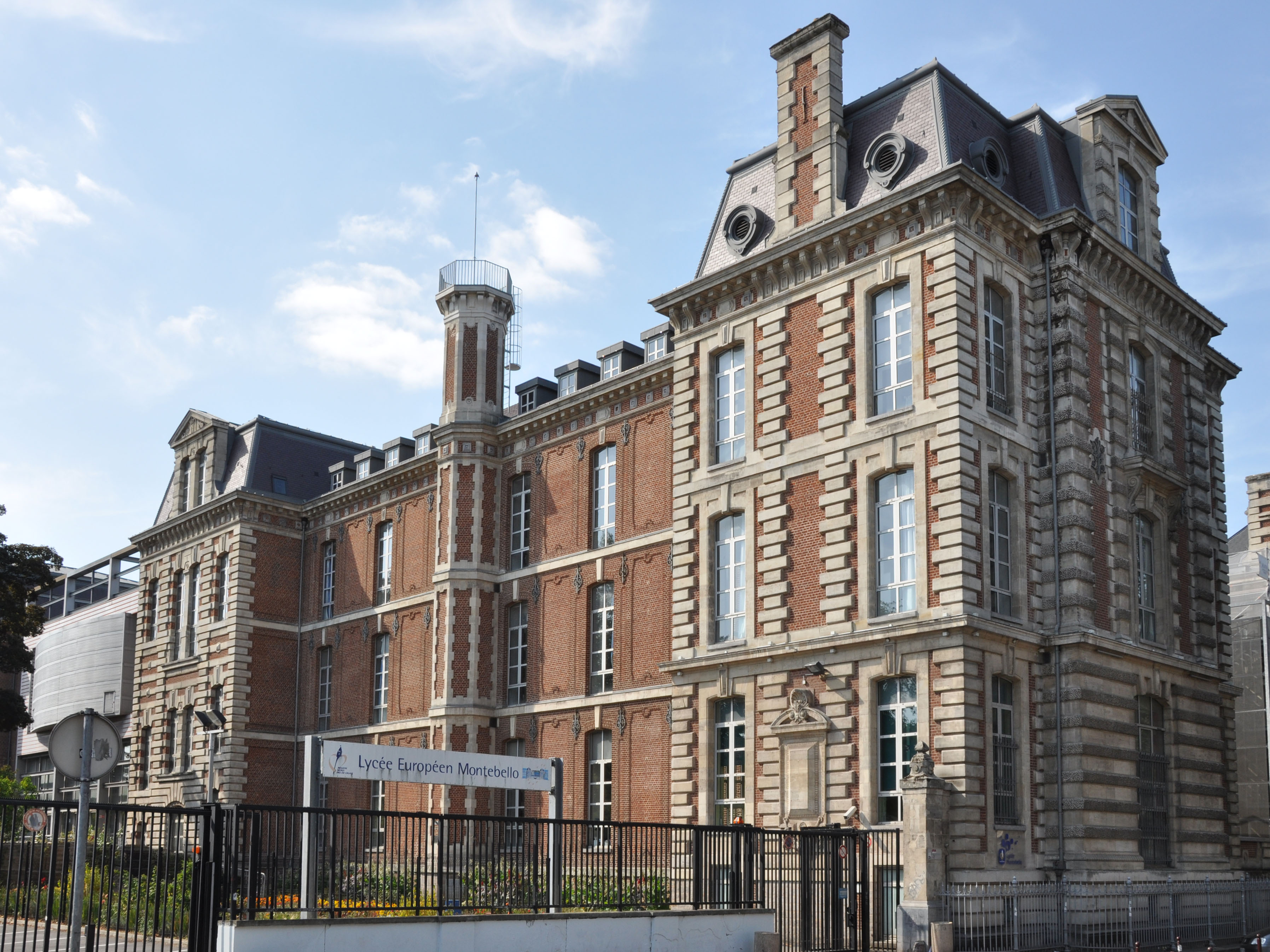
Lycée International Montebello

Lycée International Montebello, originally Lycée Européen Montebello, is a senior high school in Lille, France. Its over 3-hectare (7.4-acre) campus is in proximity to the Faubourg des Postes, Lille-Sud, Moulins, and Wazemmes neighbourhoods. It opened in September 1992 and received its current name in May 2014. This former Hospital of Charity was renovated at the end of the 19th century to host 1300 students and 200 teachers and employees. As of 2010 (circa) it had about 115 teachers, 75 other employees, and 1,400 students.

== History ==
In 1859, from the lack of beds in the hospitals around Lille, the project for a new hospital was born. August Mourcou drew the plans for this new hospital on the South West of Lille. The construction was finished by 1873 but the hospital only opened in 1876. In 1921, after a renovation supervised by the architecte Mitrofanoff, the Lycée Européen Montebello welcomed its first students. It also has a boarding facility which houses 60 girls and 13 boys.

The nearest Lille Metro station is Porte des Postes.
