= Lycée Jean-Zay =

Secondary school in Thiers, France

Coordinates: 45.863596°N 3.530195°E

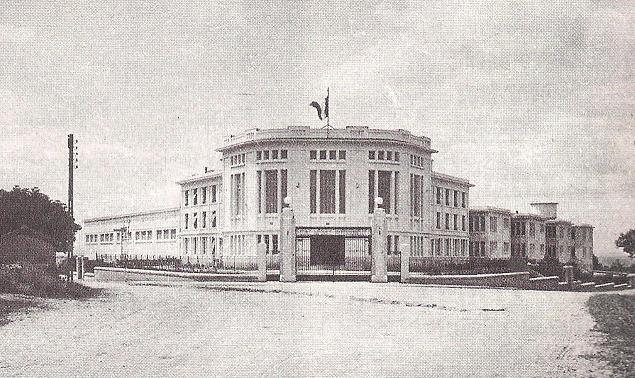
- The school shortly after its construction

Location
- 21 rue Jean Zay; Thiers 63300; France

Information
- Type: Public high school
- Established: 1933
- Principal: Jean-Marc Piqué-Rosique
- Grades: seconde to terminale, as well as CPGE and BTS
- Enrollment: around 450
- Nickname: La Nat
- Website: lyceejeanzay.net

Lycée Jean-Zay (trans. Jean Zay High School) is a public high school located in Thiers, Puy-de-Dôme, France, founded in 1933. It is a general and technical school, specialising in industrial and technical training and offering Brevet de téchnicien supérieur (BTS) qualifications and preparatory classes for the grandes écoles (prépa) in addition to the standard baccalauréat.

== History ==
=== Foundation ===
Initially named the National School of Knifecraft (École nationale de la coutellerie), then the National Professional School (École nationale professionelle, ENP), the school is sometimes known to locals as la Nat. It was in 1993 that it was renamed after minister Jean Zay by the Regional Council.

The school welcomed its first cohort in late 1933. It official inauguration took place in July 1934, and was attended by President Albert Lebrun and Colonial Minister Pierre Laval, the latter of which was from the area and pushed for the creation of the school. The authorities were keen to be seen as promoting local industry, and the creation of the school fit neatly into the working tradition of Thiers. It was the first National Professional School in Auvergne.

=== Second World War ===
The walls of the new school were soon imbued with history. After the declaration of the Second World War, the ENPs of Metz, Nancy and Épinal, situated in the occupied sone, were closed, and their students relocated to Jean Zay. Michel Bloch, a history teacher at the school who was dismissed in the wake of the Vichy regime's anti-Jewish laws in October 1940, went on to join the resistance. His replacement Charles Hainchelin directed local units of the communist resistance movement and was mortally wounded during the battle to liberate the town on 25 August 1944. On 16 January 1947, a plaque was attached to the school commemorating the ten students and four members of staff who were sent to their deaths or killed in action.

=== Postwar to present ===
In 1946, a metals testing laboratory was installed. In 1965, the ENP became the State Technical High School (Lycée technique d'état, LTE), with classes ranging from technical qualifications to preparatory classes for the grandes écoles. The school responded to the needs of local industry, but also to the evolution of society, and in 1968 welcomed its first female students. The school was completely refurbished by the Regional Council between 1992 and 2000, and in 2013 the Regional Council had the building's woodwork renovated.

Since 2010, in partnership with the Regional Council, the Direction régionale des affaires culturelles, and the art gallery Le Creux de l'Enfer, the school has hosted artists-in-residence. The artists benefit from the facilities and technical skills of the school and the students gain first-hand experience of the conception and production of artwork. Since around the turn of the millennium, the school has also hosted an art exhibition. There is also a teacher-led culture and design workshop and a cinema club which participates in national and regional projects and competitions.

== Location and architecture ==
Overlooking the town of Thiers, between the mountainous terrain of the Livradois (fr) and the Limagne plain, the high school is hard to miss, with its white colour and 1930s style. The school contributes to the industrial landscape in which it lies, and it, like the town, is open to new perspectives on the marriage of industry, art and craftsmanship.

The school is located on rue Jean-Zay (which gives it its name), near the corridor linking Thiers to Vichy. At the time of its construction it was relatively far from the town centre, but since the 1960s many residences have been constructed in the area. It is a few minutes on foot from the Lycée Montdory, specialising in academic subjects more than technical ones, and the Collège Audembron, the town's middle school. The lycée professionel, Lycée Germaine-Tillon, is located further away in the lower part of the town, and complements Jean Zay's expertise in vocational and industrial skills.

== Ranking ==
In 2017, the high school was ranked 8th out of 21 in Puy-de-Dôme for teaching quality, and 663rd in the country. The ranking was based on three criteria: baccalauréat pass rate, proportion of students in the penultimate year who obtained their baccalauréat having spent the last two years at the school, and valeur ajoutée ("value added", based on the social backgrounds, ages, and brevet results of the students).

== Bibliography ==
- Publications of Le cercle d'études de la 2e guerre mondiale Thiers et sa région chaired by René Dumont: Le bulletin du cercle, issues 5, 9, 16, 18 and 23.
- Thiers three volumes by Georges Therre et Jacques Ytournel, collected in « Mémoire en Images », ed. Alan Sutton ISBN 2-84253-500-6.ISBN 2-84253-745-9.ISBN 2-84910-212-1.
