= Luynes, Bouches-du-Rhône =

Village in Bouches-du-Rhône, France

Coordinates: 43°29′6″N 5°25′7″E

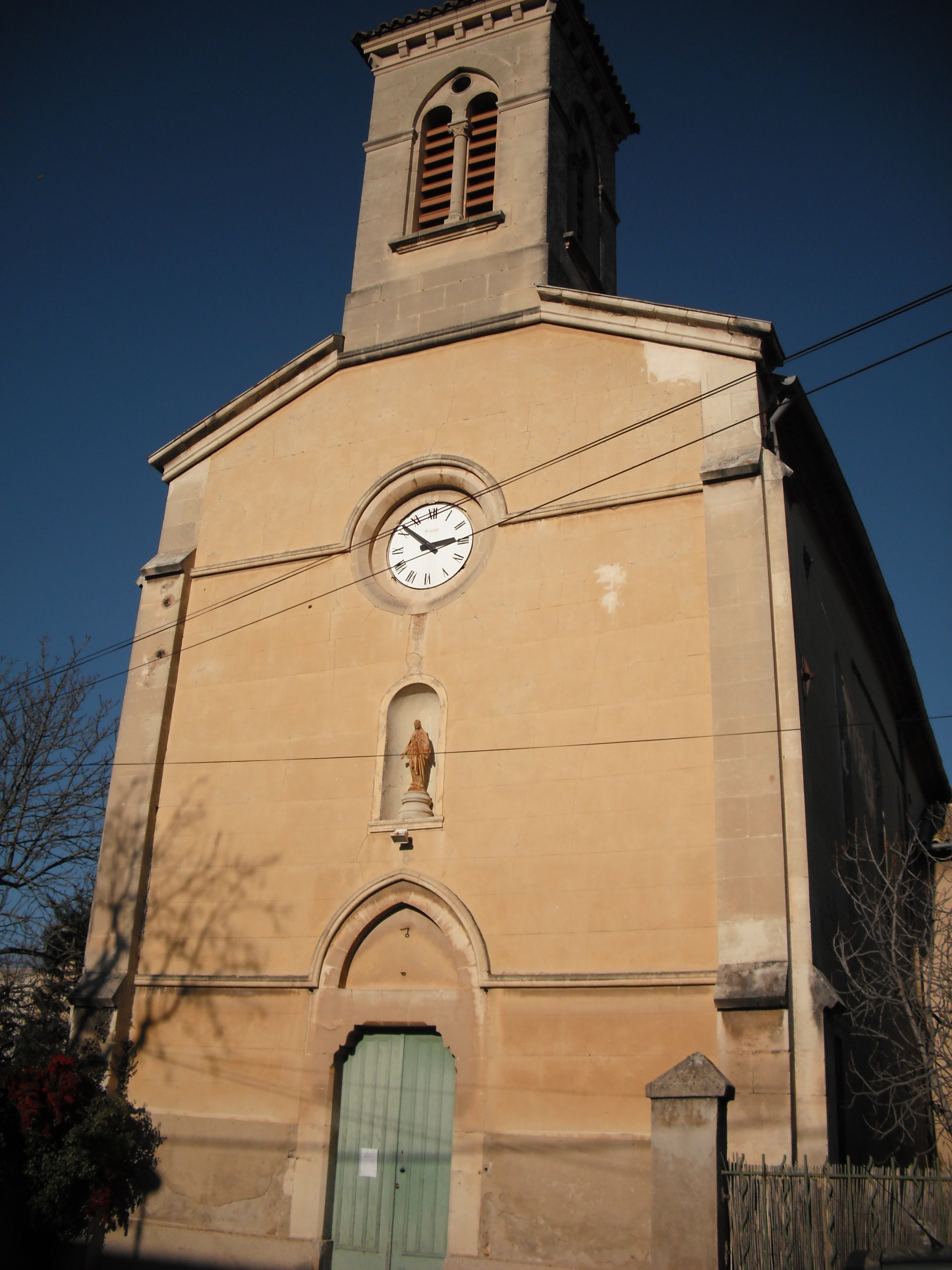
Church of Luynes

Coat of arms of Luynes, Bouches-du-Rhône

Luynes (French: [lɥin]) is a village of the Bouches-du-Rhône département in southern France. It is located 4 km south of Aix-en-Provence at the intersection of the D7 and N8 roads. The village is perhaps best known for its prison and for its three international schools. The Nécropole Nationale de Luynes is also located nearby.

Luynes is bordered by the Massif du Montaiguet, which expands to Gardanne and Aix en Provence. It comprises chalky plateaux bordered by cliffs, forests of pines and oaks, and crops areas. In 1979 and 2005 the area was devastated by bush fires. Following these incidents, garrigue is now covering a wide area.

== Education ==
The private school Saint François d’assise is in Luynes.

- International Bilingual School of Provence
- Lycée International Georges Duby

== Sport and Leisure ==
In June 2011 Zinédine Zidane inaugurate his futsal sport complex: Z5. Z5 is also home to the gym Arène Aix.

== Prison ==
Bernard Tapie was incarcerated in this prison for 165 days in 1997 following the VA-OM matter.
