= Lycée Choiseul =

Coordinates: 47.4348°N 0.6847°E

Lycée Choiseul is a senior high school/sixth-form college in Tours, Indre-et-Loire, France.

The school includes a boarding facility.

The École Supérieure « Sévigné » first opened in 1884 with 50 students, and it became the Collège de Jeunes Filles, a school for girls. It had 777 students in 1939 and 1,801 students in 1959. By 1960 it was called the Collège national moderne et technique and received its current name shortly afterward. In 1972 the school became coeducational.
