= Lycée Léonard de Vinci (Melun) =

High school in Melun, France

Lycée Léonard de Vinci is a French senior high school/sixth form college in Melun, France.

The school includes a boarding facility.

In 2014 the Greta des métiers du tertiaire moved to the second floor of building C of this school.
