= Lycée Emmanuel Mounier (Angers) =

School in France

Coordinates: 47.4890°N 0.5252°W

Lycée Emmanuel Mounier is a senior high school in Angers, Maine-et-Loire, France.

As of 2016 it had 450 students.
