= Lycée Nelson Mandela (Poitiers) =

Location
- 63 rue de la Bugellerie, Poitiers, France 46°35′53″N 0°19′50″E; France

Information
- Established: Lycée Nelson Mandela (Poitiers)
- Website: https://etab.ac-poitiers.fr/lpo-nmandela-poitiers/

Lycée Nelson Mandela ("Lycée Louis Armand" until 2015), is a senior high school in Poitiers, France.

Its inauguration took place in September 2015.

== Location ==
Lycée Nelson Mandela is located rue de la Bugellerie.

== High school ranking ==
The school is ranked 1327th in the national ranking (France).
