= Lycée Bartholdi (Saint-Denis, Seine-Saint-Denis) =

Information
- Type: Public high school

Lycée Professionnel Frédéric Bartholdi is a vocational senior high school in Saint-Denis, Seine-Saint-Denis, France, in the Paris metropolitan area. As of 2016 it has 800 students.
