= Lycée Jean Jaurès (Montreuil, Seine-Saint-Denis) =

Coordinates: 48.8646°N 2.4480°E

Lycée Jean-Jaurès
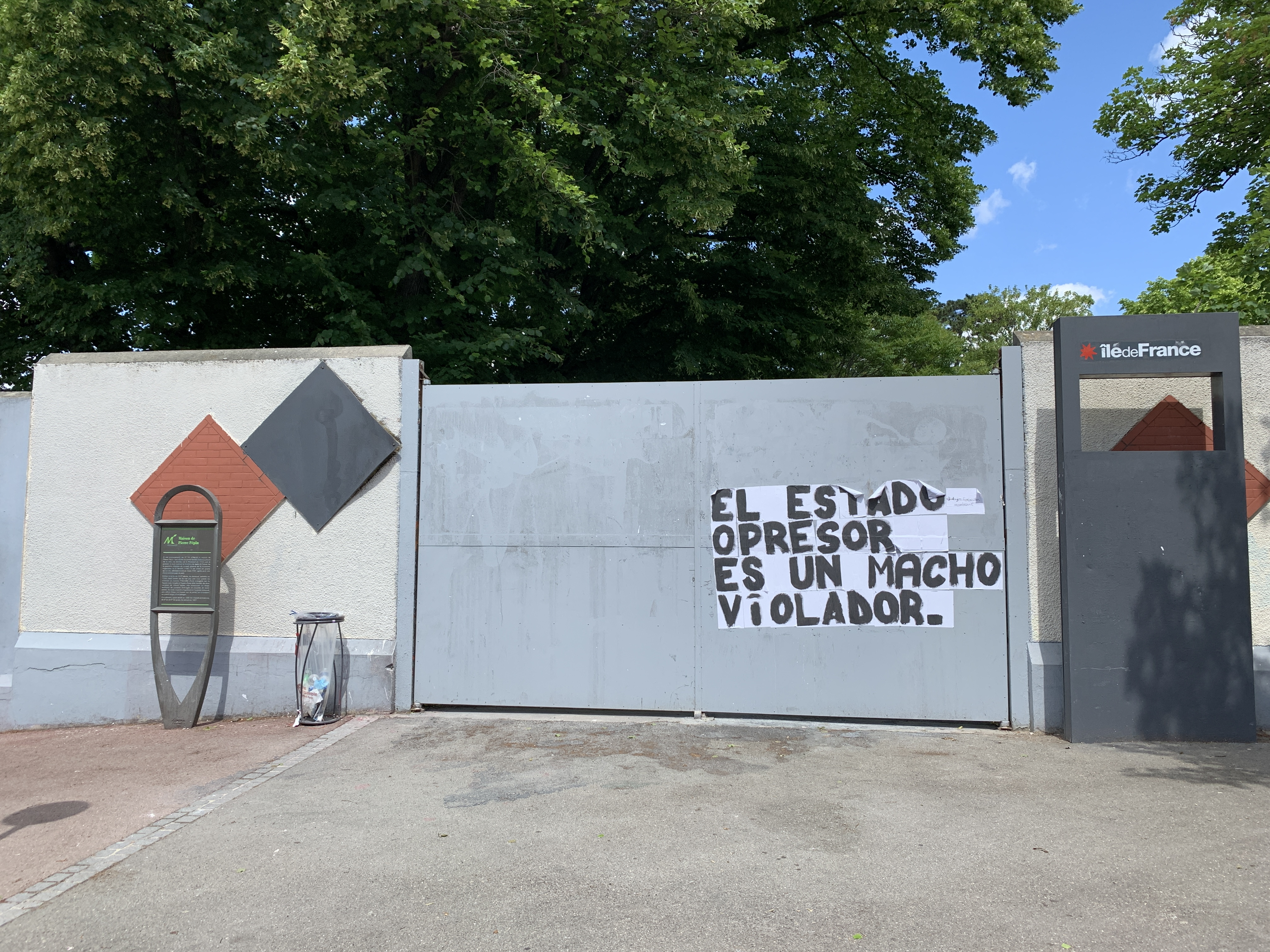

Information
- Type: Public high school

Lycée Jean Jaurès is a sixth-form college/senior high school in Montreuil, Seine-Saint-Denis, France in the Paris metropolitan area, in the area of the Murs à pêches. The school was designed by French architect Jacques Carlu: its construction started in 1960 and it opened in 1964. The school was originally designed for 2600 students. The high school is one of the five high schools in Montreuil.
