= Liceo Español Luis Buñuel =

- Lycée Espagnol Luis Buñuel
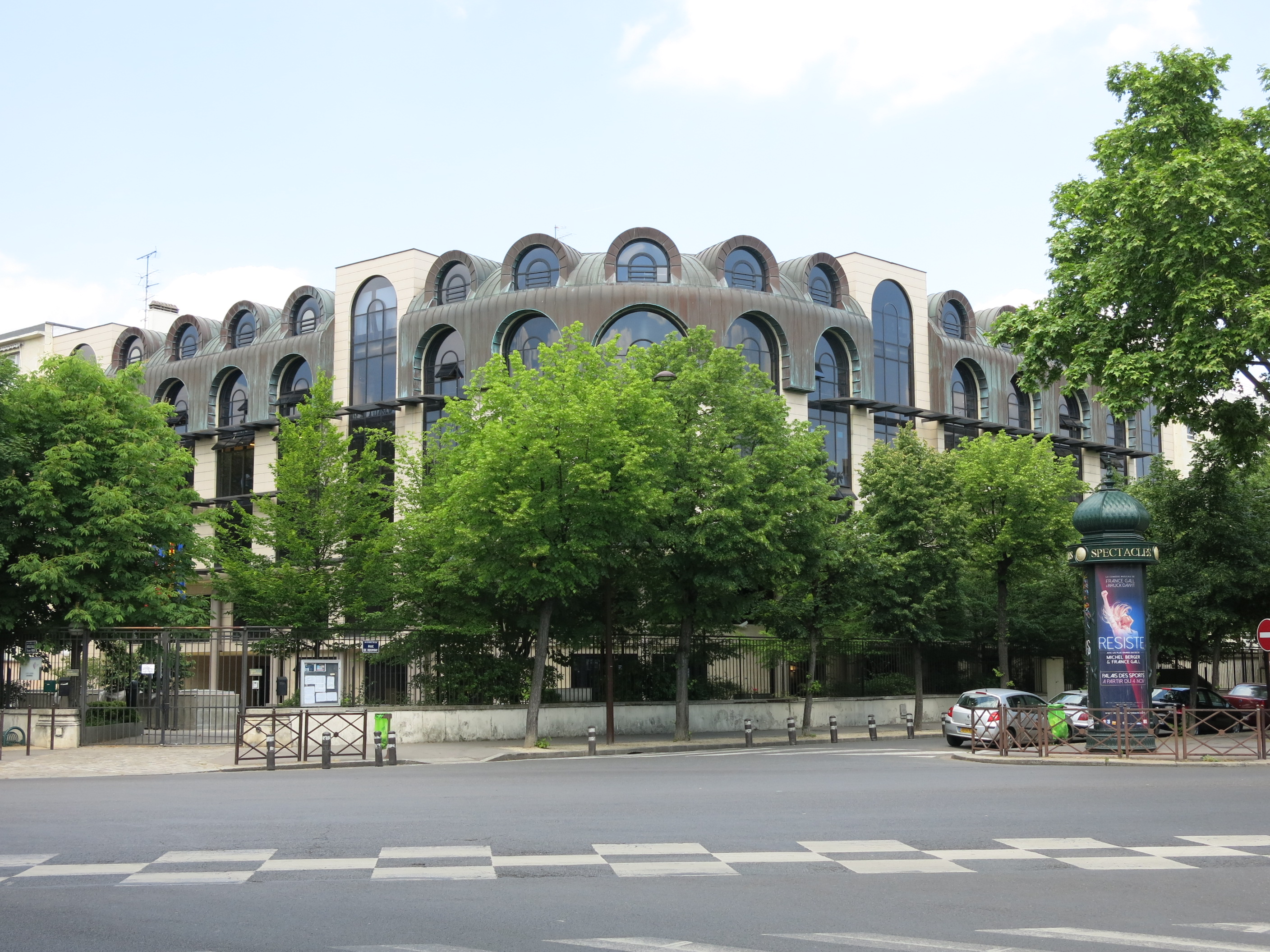
- Liceo Español Luis Buñuel

Location
- 38 Boulevard Victor Hugo, 92200 Neuilly-sur-Seine; Neuilly sur Seine; France; 48.8879°N 2.2788°E

Information
- Type: Spanish international lycée
- Established: 1961
- Website: liceoluisbunuel.educacion.es

Liceo Español Luis Buñuel (LELB, Spanish Lycee "Luis Buñuel", French: Lycée Espagnol Luis Buñuel) is a Spanish international school in Neuilly-sur-Seine, France, in the Paris metropolitan area. Operated by the Spanish Ministry of Education, the school has secundaria obligatoria (required lower secondary school) courses and bachillerato (Spanish baccalaureate, non-compulsory) education.

The Colegio Español Federico García Lorca, the Paris-area Spanish international primary school, is located in the 16th arrondissement of Paris.

== History ==
The decree of 29-XI-1962 created a Spanish Ministry of Education-dependent school in the rue de la Pompe Spanish mission. The Neuilly campus construction began according to the order of 3 March 1966. The liceo was formally created by the decree of 21 September 1967. Prior to the 2005 renaming, the school was the Liceo Español de París (French: Lycée espagnol de Paris).

The current facility opened in 2004 and was officially inaugurated on 29 March 2006, with King of Spain Juan Carlos I attending.

== Student body ==
As of 2015 the school had 217 students. 149 of them were Spanish and 68 were not Spanish. Most of the non-Spanish students originated from Latin America.

As of the 2015–2016 school year, 85.2% of the school's 230 students were Spanish nationals.

== See also ==
- List of French international schools in Spain
- Luis Buñuel, Spanish filmmaker
