= Baudilus =

Catholic martyr

Saint Baudilus
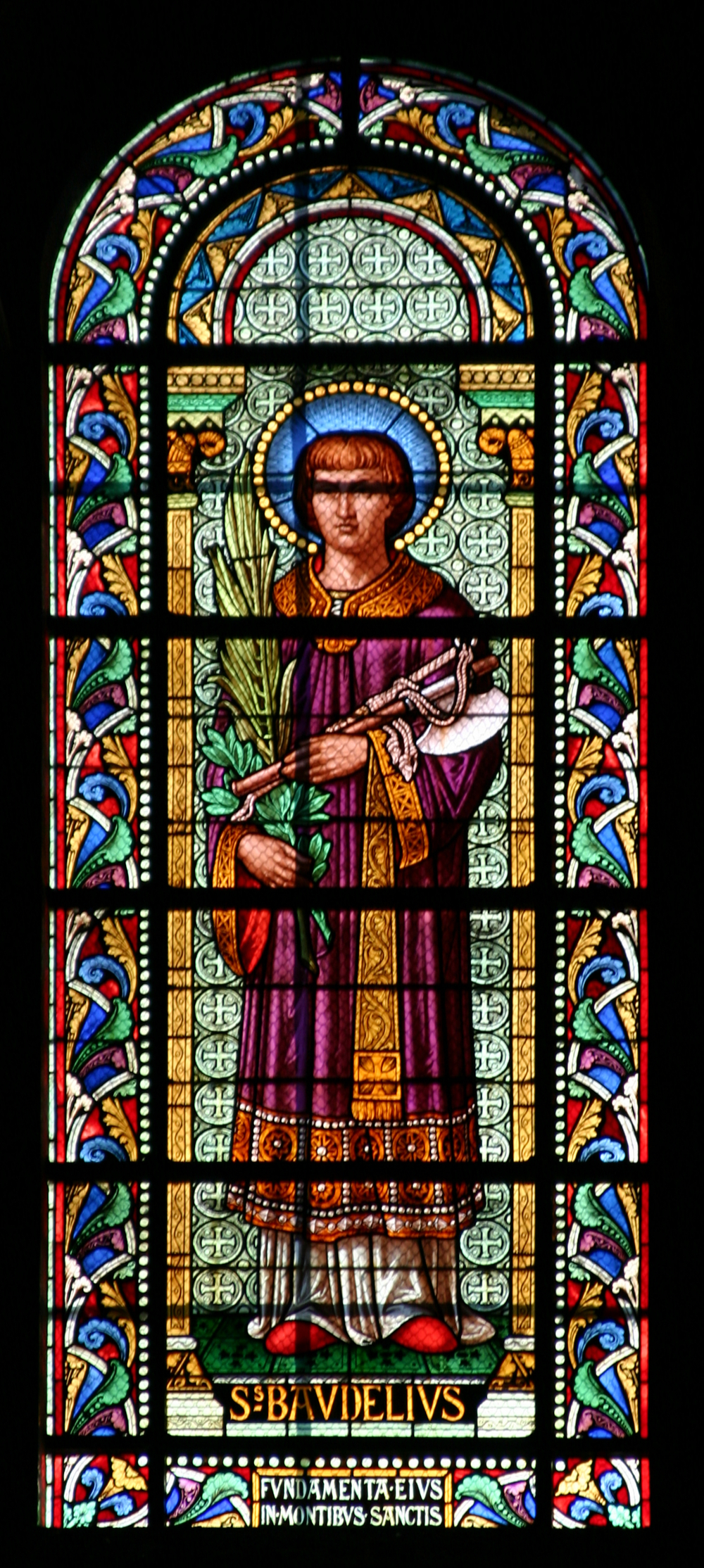
- Stained glass window in the Nîmes Cathedral

Martyr
- Died: 3rd or 4th century Nîmes
- Venerated in: Eastern Orthodox Church; Roman Catholic Church
- Major shrine: crypte de St Baudile, Nîmes; Zamora, Spain
- Feast: May 20
- Attributes: dalmatic
- Patronage: Pozaldez; Poitiers

Saint Baudilus (French: Baudile, Bausile, Basile, Spanish: Baudilio, Baudelio, Boal, Catalan: Boi, Baldiri) is venerated as a martyr by the Catholic Church. His cult is closely associated with the city of Nîmes but also spread into Spain.

== Life ==
The first missionary in Nîmes is said to have been Saint Saturnin (Saturninus), who was sent by Pope Fabian to Gaul around 245 AD. Saturnin converted a native of Nîmes, Saint Honestus, who was later martyred at Pamplona. However, the Catholic Encyclopedia writes that "the true apostle of Nîmes was St. Baudilus, whose martyrdom is placed by some at the end of the third century, and, with less reason, by others at the end of the fourth." Tradition also makes him a martyr during the reign of Julian the Apostate.

The legend of Saint Baudilus states that he was not a native of Nîmes, but was a Christian, possibly a deacon, who came into the city one day during a festival celebrated by the Salii or Agonales in honor of Veiovis. The festival was being celebrated in hills near the city, formerly covered with oaks, but now occupied by vineyards. A crowd was grouped on the hillsides, watching the ceremony, which, according to Abbé Azaïs, writing in 1872, involved animal sacrifice.

Baudilus condemned this ceremony and toppled a statue of the God. Furious at this insult, the Pagan priests whipped and then executed Baudilus by decapitating him with an ax. According to the legend, his severed head bounced three times on the ground, each impact bringing forth a spring of water. Upon these springs of water was later built an oratory: l'oratoire des Trois-Fontaines ("Three Fountains").

Baudilus’ body was collected by his wife and then was transported to a place called "Valsainte", where he was buried by a pre-existing colony of Christians. Valsainte became a place of pilgrimage. A church was built there in the fourth century and a monastery in 511 AD, which survived until the 17th century. The crypt of Saint Baudilus (la crypte de St Baudile) at the corner of rue des Moulins and rue des Trois Fontaines, marks the alleged spot where Baudilus was martyred.

Jules Igolin writes that Nîmes became the site of a bishopric by the fourth century and that its first bishop was Felix of Nîmes, who was martyred around 407 AD.

== Veneration in France ==
Baudilus is the patron of various churches in France and also in Germany, including churches in Noves, Fabrègues, and Neuilly-sur-Marne.

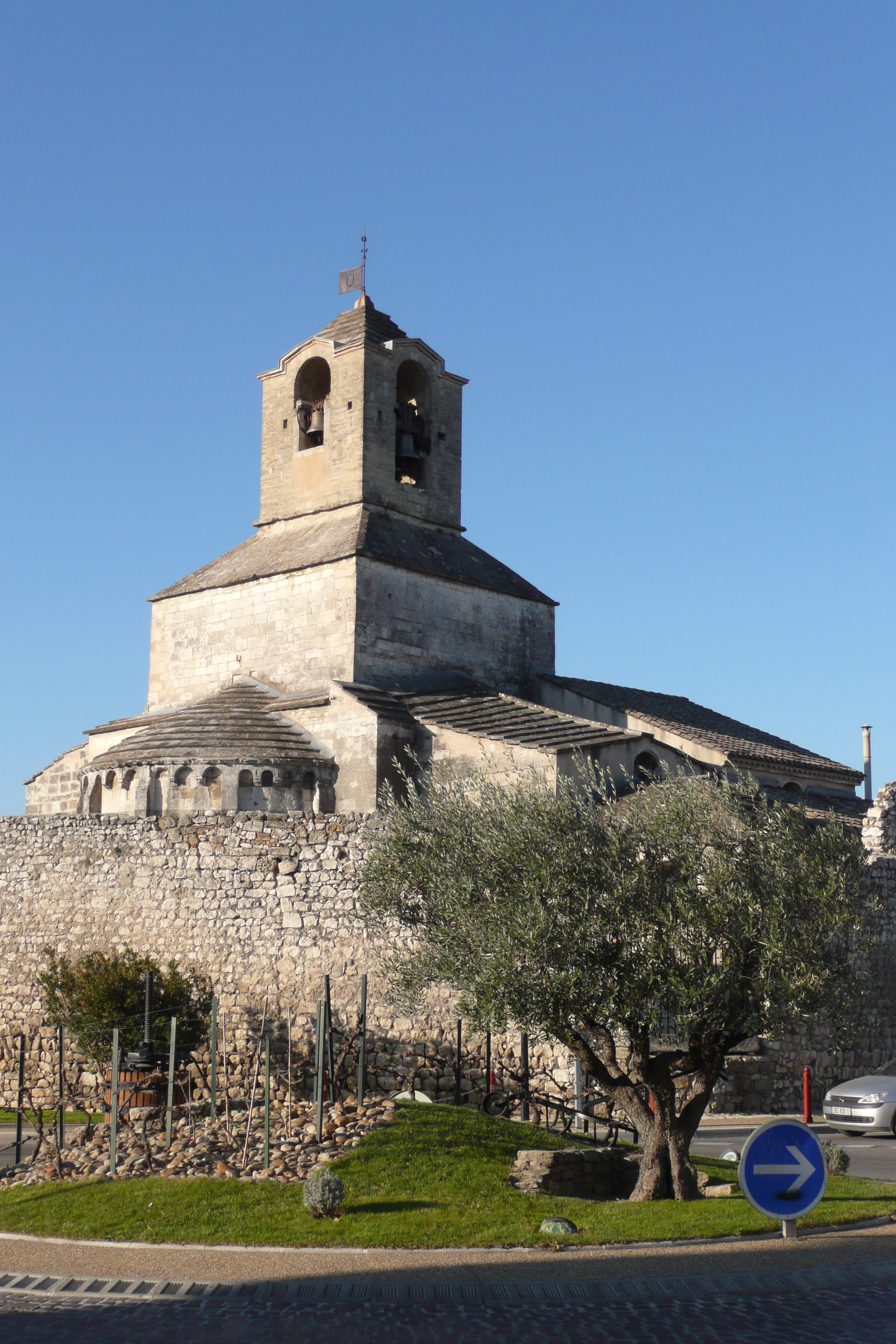
Eglise Sainte Baudile, Noves

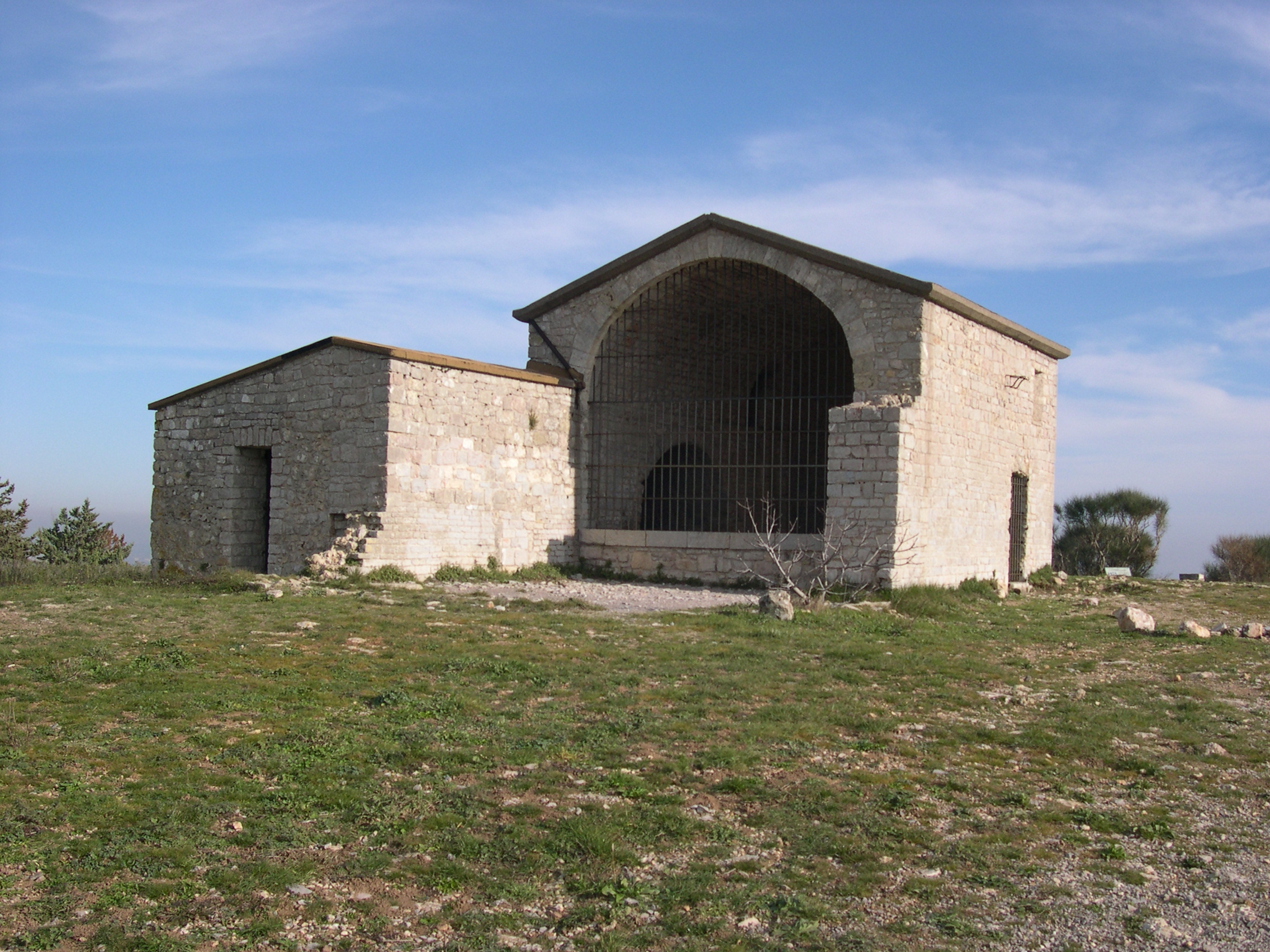
St-Baudile, Fabrègues

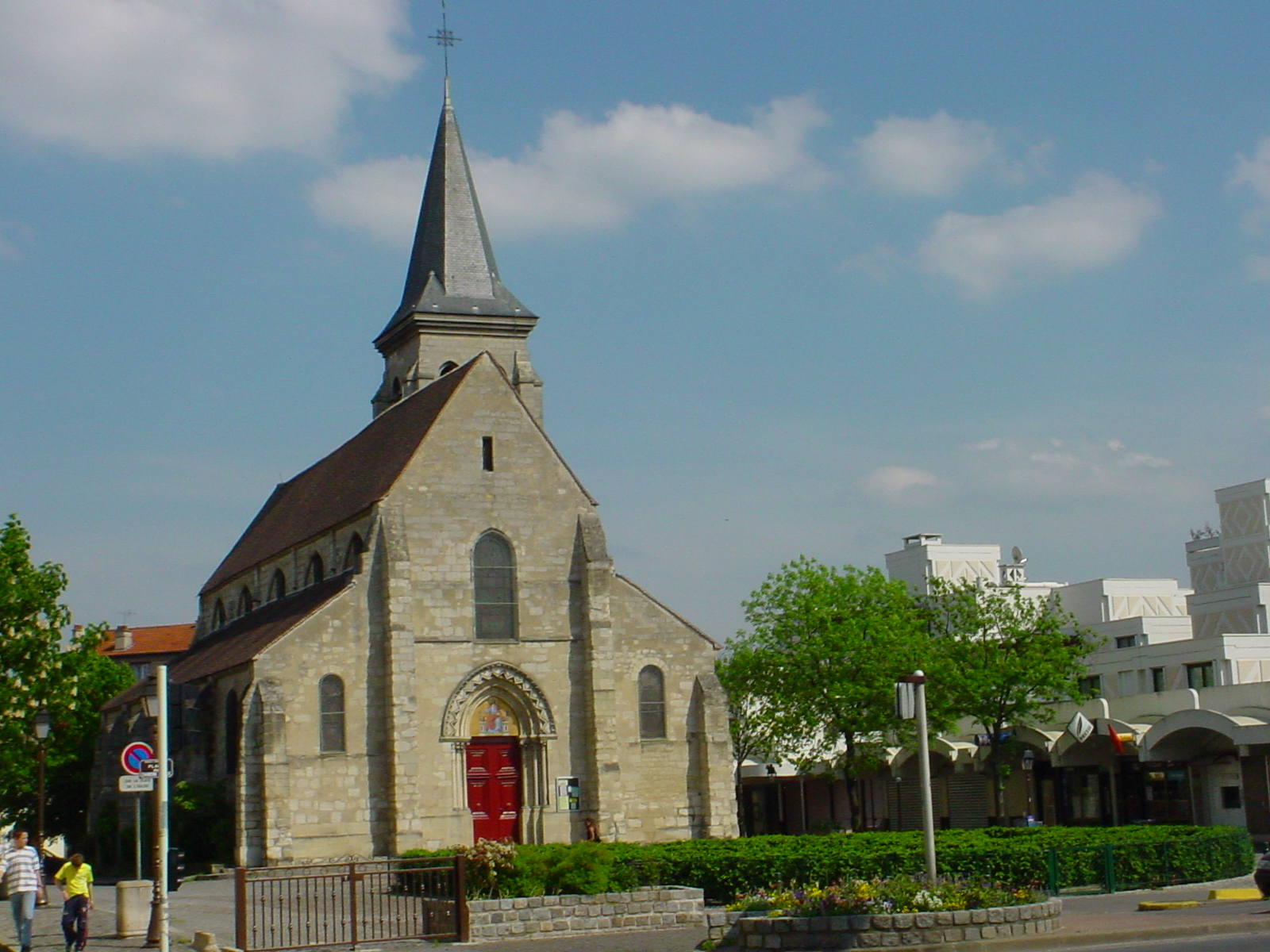
Saint-Baudile, Neuilly-sur-Marne

== Cult in Spain ==
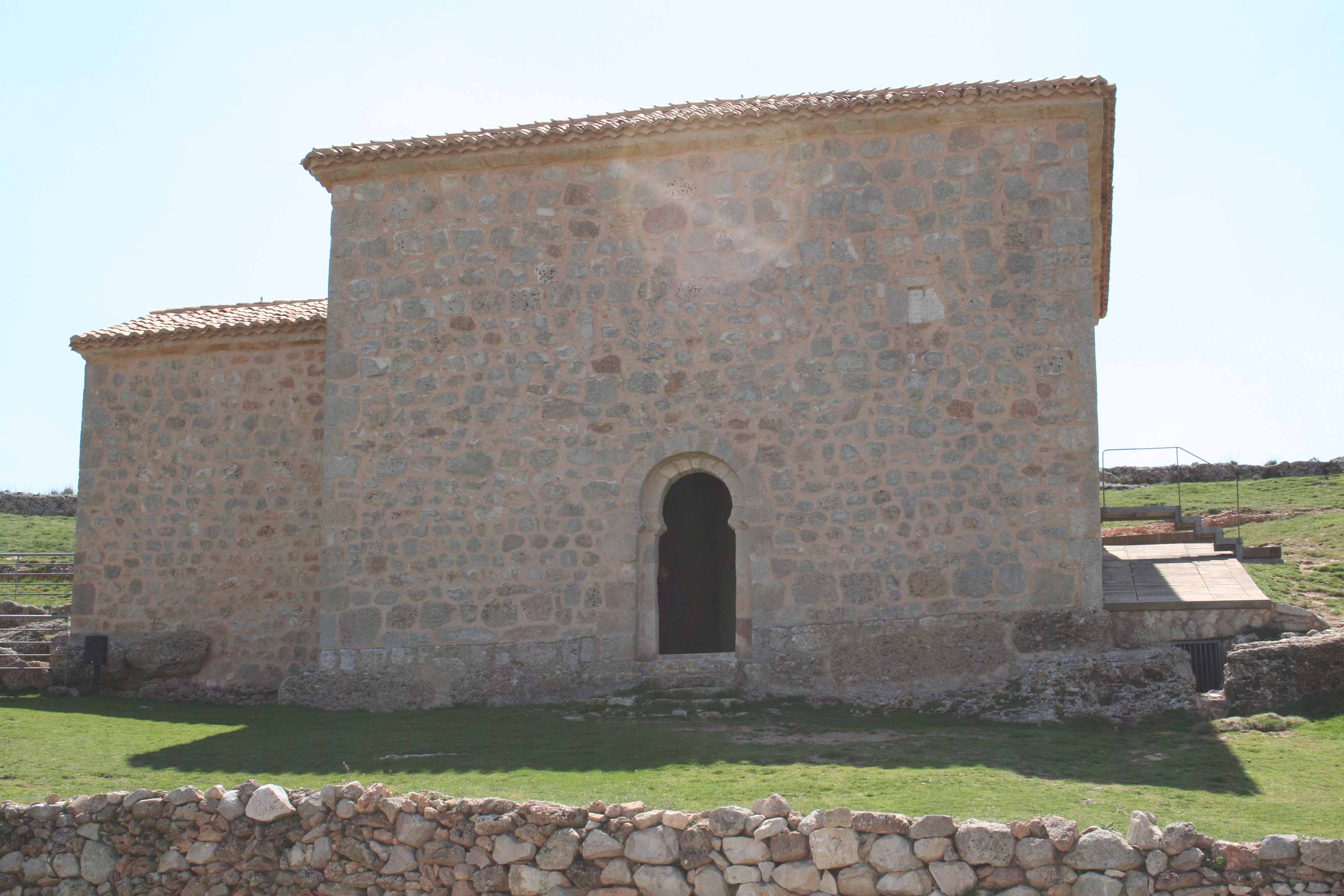
Church of San Baudelio de Berlanga.

His cult spread into Spain, where he became the patron of various churches. His name acquired variants, including Baudelio, Boal, Boi, Baldiri (the last two are Catalan). One source has stated that Baudilus’ fame as a thaumaturgus resulted in his cult spreading beyond France, with a very widespread cult in Spain, including Catalonia. His cult even spread as far as what are now the Czech Republic and Slovakia. Baudilus is mentioned briefly in Robert Southey's Roderick. The notes to the text state that Baudilus "is a saint very little known, [and] it will be proper to say something of him. This saint is much reverenced in Salamanca and in Zamora; and in both cities, he has a parochial church, and in Zamora, they have a good part of his relics. They have so much corrupted the name, calling him St. Boal, that the saint is now scarcely known by his own." The church of San Boal in Salamanca has an image of the saint, and there is also a palace of the same name in the city.

Castile-Leon

- Mozarabic church of San Baudelio de Berlanga (Caltojar, Soria).
- Mudéjar church of San Baudilio, Samboal (Segovia).
- Sambol (Burgos), monastery in ruins, which gave name to a creek on the Way of St. James.
- Moraleja de las Panaderas (Valladolid), church of San Boal or San Baudilio.
- Pozaldez, parish of San Boal. Patron saint (feast day: May 20).
- Parish of San Boal, city of Salamanca. Nearby is the Palacio de San Boal.
- Blascosancho (Ávila), church of San Boal.

Catalonia

- Hermitage of Sant Baldiri (Vilarig, Girona).
- Hermitage of Sant Baldiri (Lliçà de Munt, Barcelona).
- Parish church of Sant Baldiri, Sant Boi de Llobregat (Barcelona).
- Parish church of Sant Baldiri, Sant Boi de Lluçanès (Barcelona).

La Rioja

- Muro de Aguas (La Rioja). Feast day of Saint Baudilus celebrated.
