= Lycée Georges Clemenceau =

Lycée Georges Clemenceau may refer to the following French schools:

- Lycée Georges-Clemenceau - Champagne-sur-Seine
- Lycée Georges Clemenceau - Chantonnay
- Cité Scolaire Georges Clemenceau - Montpellier
- Lycée Georges Clemenceau (Nantes)
- Lycée Georges-Clemenceau - Reims
- Cité Scolaire Georges Clemenceau Sartène - Sartène
- Lycée Georges Clemenceau - Villemomble (Paris area)
