= Moraleja (disambiguation) =

Moraleja is a municipality in the province of Cáceres, Extremadura, Spain.

Moraleja may also refer to:

- "Moraleja", a 1994 song of Hermética, from Víctimas del Vaciamiento
- Moraleja de Enmedio, municipality in the community of Madrid, Spain
- Moraleja de Matacabras, municipality in the province of Ávila, Spain
- Moraleja de las Panaderas, municipality in the community of Madrid, Spain
- Moraleja del Vino, municipality in the province of Zamora, Spain
- Moraleja de Sayago, municipality in the province of Ávila, Spain
- Moraleja de Coca, a village in the municipality of Nava de la Asunción, province of Segovia, Spain
