= Lycée Albert Schweitzer =

Lycée Albert Schweitzer may refer to the following French schools:

- Lycée Albert Schweitzer - Le Raincy (Paris metropolitan area)
- Lycée Albert Schweitzer - Mulhouse
