= Fatima Daas =

French-Algerian novelist

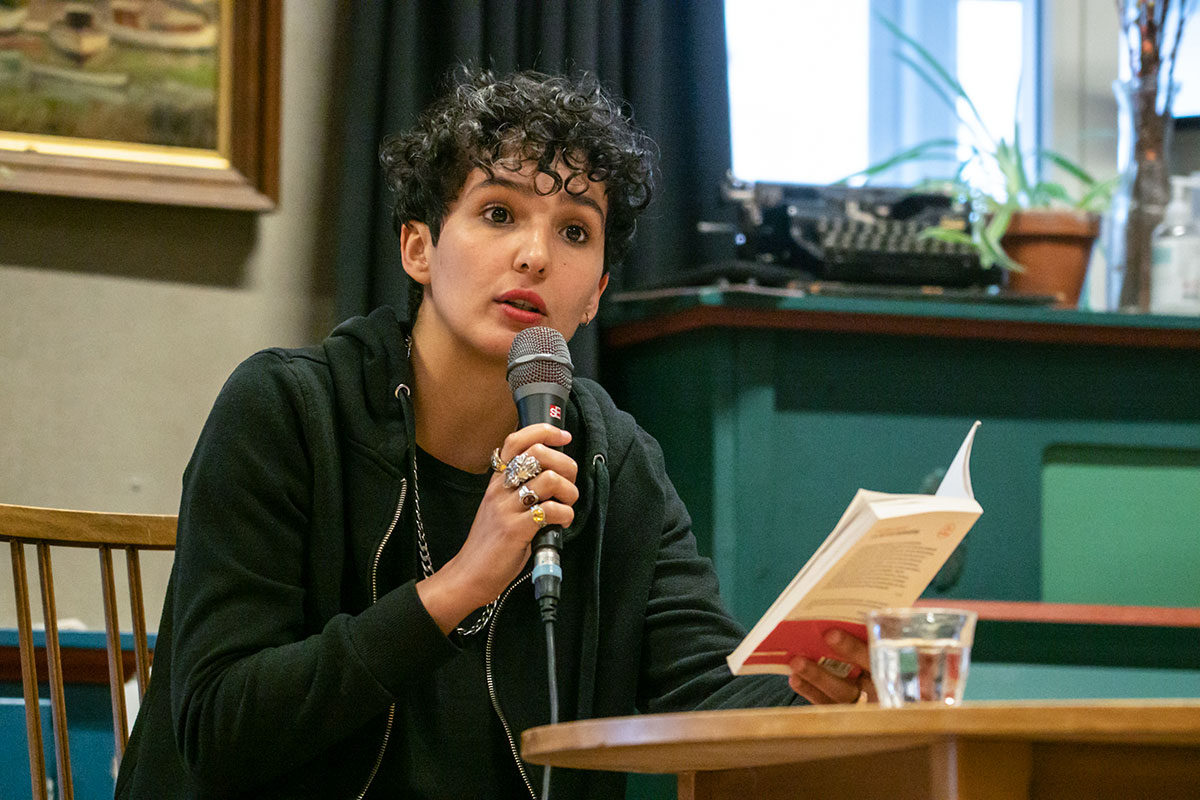
- Fatima Daas at the 2022 LiteratureXchange Festival in Aarhus, Denmark
- Born: 1995 (age 30–31); Saint-Germain-en-Laye, France
- Education: Paris 8 University Vincennes-Saint-Denis
- Occupation: Novelist
- Writing career
- Language: French

Fatima Daas (born 1995) is a French writer. Her debut novel, The Last One (French: La Petite Dernière), follows the life of a young Muslim woman as she explores her sexuality, religion, and relationships while living in Clichy-sous-Bois, a suburb of Paris.

== Biography ==
Daas was born in Saint-Germain-en-Laye to an Algerian immigrant family. Her family settled in the working-class Parisian suburb of Clichy-sous-Bois and she spent much of her childhood in the surrounding department of Seine-Saint-Denis. Daas is the youngest of three daughters and the only French-born. Daas and her family are Muslim. Daas is a lesbian and describes herself as an intersectional feminist.

Daas attended Lycée Alfred Nobel. While there, Daas began writing and attended writing workshops led by the French writer Tanguy Viel. She went on to enroll at Paris 8 University Vincennes-Saint-Denis where she completed a master's degree in creative writing. As a part of her coursework, Daas wrote a novel over a period of 18 months that ultimately became The Last One.

Fatima Daas is not Daas' real name. Daas has refused to share her real name to avoid involving her family in her career. Daas has stated that a pseudonym allows her to reinvent herself and explore multiple identities through her work.

== The Last One ==
The Last One was first published in French on August 20, 2020 when Daas was 25 years old, and subsequently translated into English by Lara Vergnaud for publication on November 23, 2021. Daas describes the novel as a work of autofiction, as the life of the main character, who is also named Fatima Daas, parallels Daas' own. The book explores the intersection of the protagonist's identity as a queer Muslim woman studying and living in an immigrant-majority suburb. When discussing the seemingly conflicted nature of the character's – and Daas' own – identities, Daas has stated: "I was never ashamed of being a lesbian, but I was ashamed of the loneliness of being unable to talk about it. I wanted to transmit this feeling in my writing by inhabiting a character that refuses to choose, despite the external pressures of the world".

She cites the work of Marguerite Duras, Abdellah Taïa, Athena Farrokhzad, Faïza Guène, Mehdi Charef, and Annie Ernaux as inspirations for her own writing. References to Duras and Ernaux appear throughout The Last One. At Paris 8, while working on The Last One, Daas met French filmmaker and novelist, Virginie Despantes, when the latter came to deliver a talk; Despentes encouraged Daas to continue working on her novel as it touched on subject matters rarely featured in French novels. Despentes went on to praise the published novel and give it a blurb.

The novel was named one of Bustle's best new books of the week of 22 November 2021, one of Library Journal's top debuts of winter 2022, and one of Lambda Literary's most anticipated books of November 2021.

== Awards and nominations ==
- Les Inrockuptibles Prize for Debut Novel 2020
- Macondo Prize 2021
- PEN Translation Prize finalist 2022
