= Neuilly-sur-Marne =

- Commune
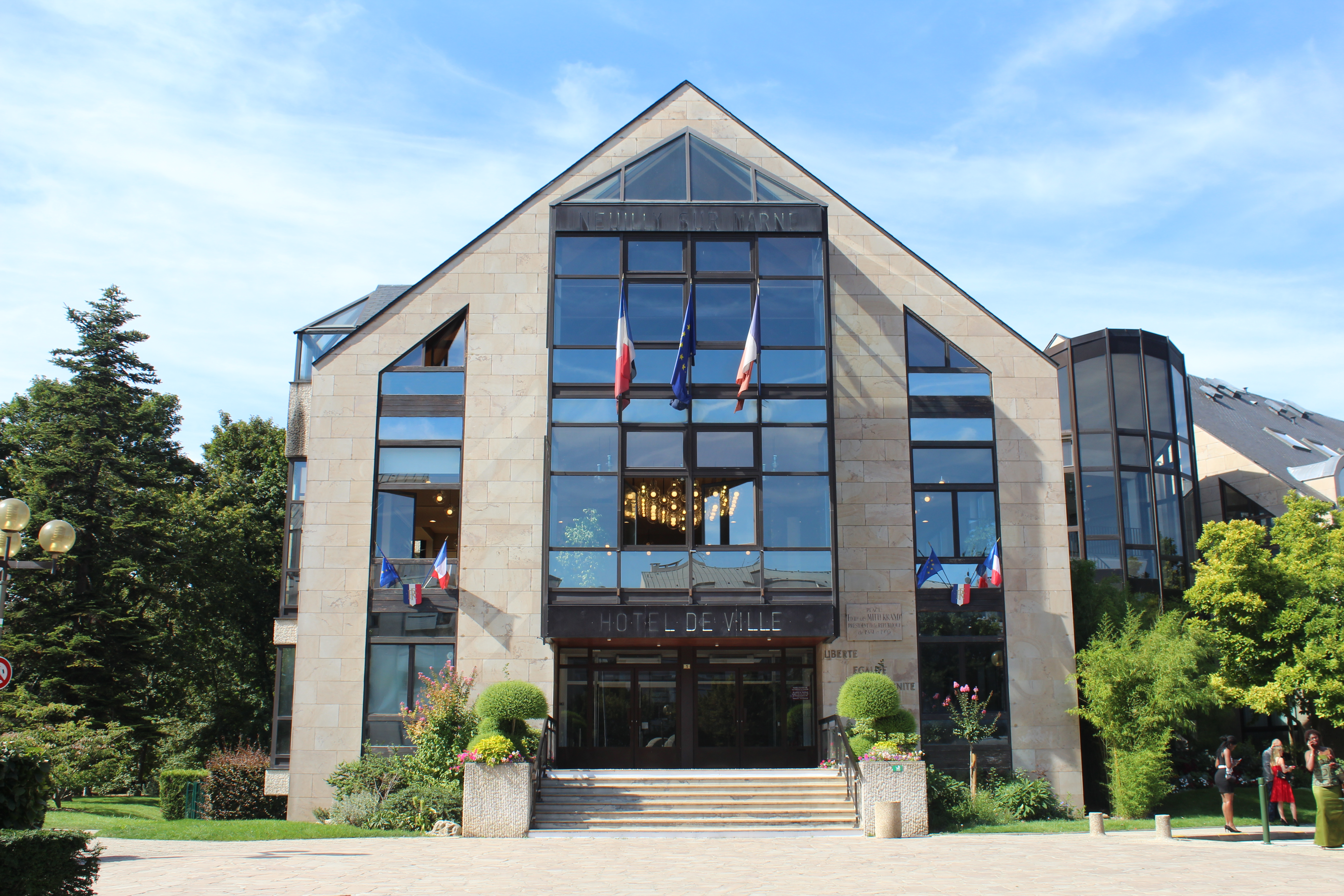
- The Hôtel de Ville

- Coat of arms

- Location (in red) within Paris inner suburbs
- Location of Neuilly-sur-Marne
- Location within France Location within Île-de-France (region)
- Coordinates: 48°51′13″N 2°32′56″E
- Country: France
- Region: Île-de-France
- Department: Seine-Saint-Denis
- Arrondissement: Le Raincy
- Canton: Gagny
- Intercommunality: Grand Paris

Government
  - Mayor (2026–32): Zartoshte Bakhtiari
- Area^{1}: 6.86 km^{2} (2.65 sq mi)
- Highest elevation: 80 m (260 ft)
- Lowest elevation: 36 m (118 ft)
- Population (2023): 39,800
  - Density: 5,800/km^{2} (15,000/sq mi)
- Time zone: UTC+01:00 (CET)
  - Summer (DST): UTC+02:00 (CEST)
- INSEE/Postal code: 93050 /93330
- ^{1} French Land Register data, which excludes lakes, ponds, glaciers > 1 km^{2} (0.386 sq mi or 247 acres) and river estuaries.

Neuilly-sur-Marne (French pronunciation: [nœji syʁ maʁn], lit. 'Neuilly on Marne') is a French commune in the Seine-Saint-Denis department, Île-de-France. It is located 13.1 km (8.1 mi) from the center of Paris.

== Geography ==
Crossed by the river Marne.

=== Climate ===
Neuilly-sur-Marne has an oceanic climate (Köppen climate classification Cfb). The average annual temperature in Neuilly-sur-Marne is 12.3 °C (54.1 °F). The average annual rainfall is 721.2 mm (28.39 in) with December as the wettest month. The temperatures are highest on average in July, at around 20.7 °C (69.3 °F), and lowest in January, at around 4.9 °C (40.8 °F). The highest temperature ever recorded in Neuilly-sur-Marne was 42.5 °C (108.5 °F) on 25 July 2019; the coldest temperature ever recorded was −17.0 °C (1.4 °F) on 17 January 1985.

Climate data for Neuilly-sur-Marne (1991−2020 normals, extremes 1981−present)
Month	Jan	Feb	Mar	Apr	May	Jun	Jul	Aug	Sep	Oct	Nov	Dec	Year
Record high °C (°F)	16.6 (61.9)	21.4 (70.5)	26.9 (80.4)	29.9 (85.8)	33.1 (91.6)	38.3 (100.9)	42.5 (108.5)	40.5 (104.9)	35.4 (95.7)	29.7 (85.5)	22.5 (72.5)	18.0 (64.4)	42.5 (108.5)
Mean daily maximum °C (°F)	7.7 (45.9)	9.0 (48.2)	13.1 (55.6)	16.8 (62.2)	20.4 (68.7)	23.8 (74.8)	26.2 (79.2)	26.2 (79.2)	22.0 (71.6)	16.9 (62.4)	11.3 (52.3)	8.1 (46.6)	16.8 (62.2)
Daily mean °C (°F)	4.9 (40.8)	5.4 (41.7)	8.5 (47.3)	11.5 (52.7)	15.1 (59.2)	18.4 (65.1)	20.7 (69.3)	20.4 (68.7)	16.6 (61.9)	12.7 (54.9)	8.1 (46.6)	5.4 (41.7)	12.3 (54.1)
Mean daily minimum °C (°F)	2.1 (35.8)	1.9 (35.4)	4.0 (39.2)	6.2 (43.2)	9.8 (49.6)	13.1 (55.6)	15.1 (59.2)	14.7 (58.5)	11.2 (52.2)	8.5 (47.3)	5.0 (41.0)	2.6 (36.7)	7.8 (46.0)
Record low °C (°F)	−17.0 (1.4)	−12.5 (9.5)	−9.5 (14.9)	−4.3 (24.3)	−0.6 (30.9)	4.0 (39.2)	7.5 (45.5)	5.0 (41.0)	1.5 (34.7)	−4.5 (23.9)	−8.7 (16.3)	−8.9 (16.0)	−17.0 (1.4)
Average precipitation mm (inches)	57.7 (2.27)	50.6 (1.99)	51.5 (2.03)	50.2 (1.98)	72.4 (2.85)	62.4 (2.46)	64.4 (2.54)	60.4 (2.38)	52.2 (2.06)	60.5 (2.38)	62.8 (2.47)	76.1 (3.00)	721.2 (28.39)
Average precipitation days (≥ 1.0 mm)	11.5	10.4	10.0	8.9	9.6	8.7	7.9	8.8	8.1	10.1	11.3	12.8	118.0
Source: Météo-France

== Toponymy ==
Neuilly was first recorded as Nobiliacum in a Latin charter in around 998. The name is derived from the Latin novale, meaning 'newly cleared land'.

== History ==
On 13 April 1892, a third of the territory of Neuilly-sur-Marne was detached and became the commune of Neuilly-Plaisance. The Hôtel de Ville was completed in 1987.

Historical population

Year	Pop.	±% p.a.
1793	581	—
1800	621	+0.96%
1806	624	+0.08%
1821	749	+1.22%
1831	935	+2.24%
1836	945	+0.21%
1841	974	+0.61%
1846	973	−0.02%
1851	1,021	+0.97%
1856	1,105	+1.59%
1861	1,205	+1.75%
1866	2,051	+11.22%
1872	2,560	+3.76%
1876	3,646	+9.24%
1881	4,794	+5.63%
1886	6,097	+4.93%
1891	6,374	+0.89%
1896	3,118	−13.33%
1901	4,118	+5.72%

Year	Pop.	±% p.a.
1906	4,432	+1.48%
1911	5,621	+4.87%
1921	6,271	+1.10%
1926	8,654	+6.65%
1931	10,415	+3.77%
1936	11,224	+1.51%
1946	10,541	−0.63%
1954	12,798	+2.45%
1962	15,082	+2.07%
1968	22,543	+6.93%
1975	30,168	+4.25%
1982	31,195	+0.48%
1990	31,461	+0.11%
1999	32,754	+0.45%
2007	33,422	+0.25%
2012	34,658	+0.73%
2017	34,993	+0.19%
2023	39,800	+2.17%

Source: EHESS and INSEE (1968-2023)

== Transport ==
Neuilly-sur-Marne is served by no station of the Paris Métro, RER, or suburban rail network. The closest station to Neuilly-sur-Marne is Neuilly-Plaisance station on Paris RER line A. This station is located in the neighboring commune of Neuilly-Plaisance, 1.3 km (0.81 mi) from the town center of Neuilly-sur-Marne.

== Education ==
Schools in the commune:

- 12 preschools/nursery schools (maternelles):
- 10 elementary schools
- Junior high schools (collèges): Georges Braque, Albert Camus, and Honoré de Balzac
- 1 Senior high school/sixth-form college : Lycée Cugnot

Senior high schools/sixth-form colleges in the surrounding area include:

- Lycée Georges Clemenceau - Villemomble
- Lycée Gustave Eiffel - Gagny
- Lycée Evariste Galois - Noisy-le-Grand

== Monuments ==
- Church of Saint Baudilus

== Personalities ==
- Evens Joseph, footballer
- Sylvain Wiltord, footballer
- William Vainqueur, footballer

== Heraldry ==
arms of Neuilly-sur-Marne	the arms of Neuilly-sur-Marne are blazoned : Argent, a fess wavy azure between in chief a Latin cross gules and 2 crescents inverted vert, and in base a rake and a shovel in saltire gules.

== See also ==
- Communes of the Seine-Saint-Denis department
