= Lycée Albert Schweitzer (Le Raincy) =

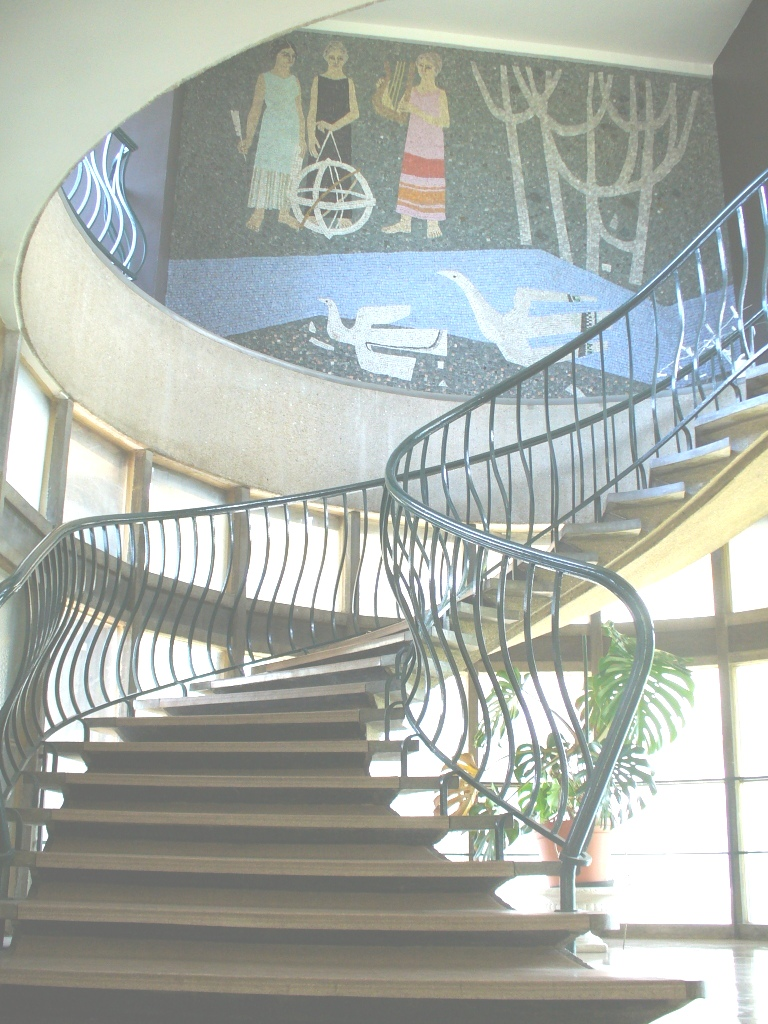

Information
- Type: Public high school

Lycée Albert Schweitzer is a senior high school/sixth-form college in Le Raincy, Seine-Saint-Denis, France, in the Paris metropolitan area.

== History ==
In 1953 the construction of the campus was assigned to a Mr. Petit. Originally the school was an annex of Lycée Charlemagne of Paris but it became independent in 1956.

Lycée Georges Clemenceau in Villemomble was an annex of this school from 1946 to 1961.

The school building was renovated in 1992. In December 1999 a storm damaged the building's roof; it was repaired in 2002.

As of 2007 students in low income Seine-Saint-Denis communes such as Bondy and Clichy-sous-Bois used the art history programme at Schweitzer to avoid enrolling at their local high schools, such as Lycée Alfred Nobel in Clichy-sous-Bois.
