= Claude Dilain =

French politician (1948–2015)

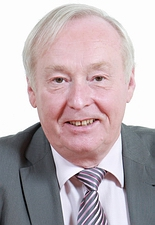

Member of the French Senate for Seine-Saint-Denis
- In office 1 October 2011 – 3 March 2015
- Succeeded by: Évelyne Yonnet

Mayor of Clichy-sous-Bois
- In office 18 June 1995 – 1 October 2011
- Preceded by: Gérard Probert
- Succeeded by: Olivier Klein

Personal details
- Born: 12 August 1948 Saint-Denis, France
- Died: 3 March 2015 (aged 66) Paris, France
- Party: Socialist Party
- Profession: Pediatrician

Claude Dilain (12 August 1948 – 3 March 2015) was a French politician. He was a member of the French Senate from 2011 until his death in 2015. He also served as Mayor of Clichy-sous-Bois.
