= Church of Saint Baudilus, Neuilly-sur-Marne =

Roman Catholic church in Seine-Saint-Denis, France

- Église Saint-Baudile de Neuilly-sur-Marne (French)
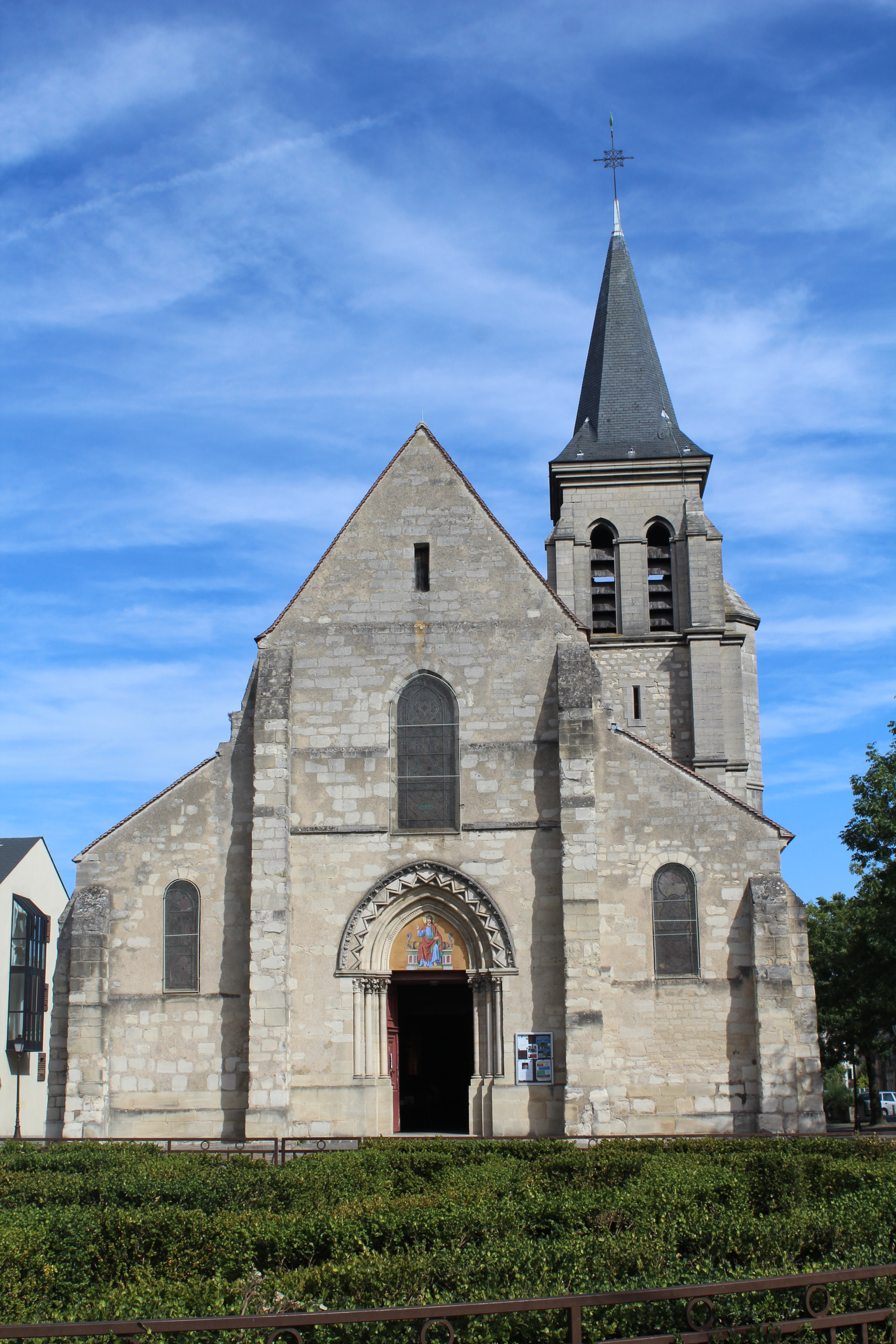

- Location within Paris and inner ring
- 48°51′22″N 2°31′56″E
- Type: Roman Catholic church
- Location: Place du Chanoine-Hérou; Neuilly-sur-Marne, Seine-Saint-Denis, France

History
- Founder: Father Foulques
- Built: started 1199

Monument historique
- Official name: Eglise Saint-Baudile
- Criteria: Class MH
- Designated: 10 September 1913
- Reference no.: PA00079940

The church of Saint Baudilus (French: église Saint-Baudile) is a Roman Catholic church in Neuilly-sur-Marne in the department of Seine-Saint-Denis, France. It is dedicated to Saint Baudilus, a martyr of the 3rd century. It is listed as a Class Historic Monument.

== History ==
The construction of the church was initiated in 1199 by Father Foulques, a native of the village. The church is one of the earliest examples of Gothic church architecture in France.

Father Foulques preached in the church for the raising of the Fourth Crusade in the name of Pope Innocent III.

When Foulques died in 1203, the construction works were not ended. Therefore, the windows opened above the former sacristy were never filled with stained glass and were walled up.

The church was listed as a Class Historic Monument in 1913. It has capitals and a statue of the Virgin Mary dating from the 13th century.
