= Hôtel de Ville, Villemomble =

Town hall in Villemomble, France

Hôtel de Ville
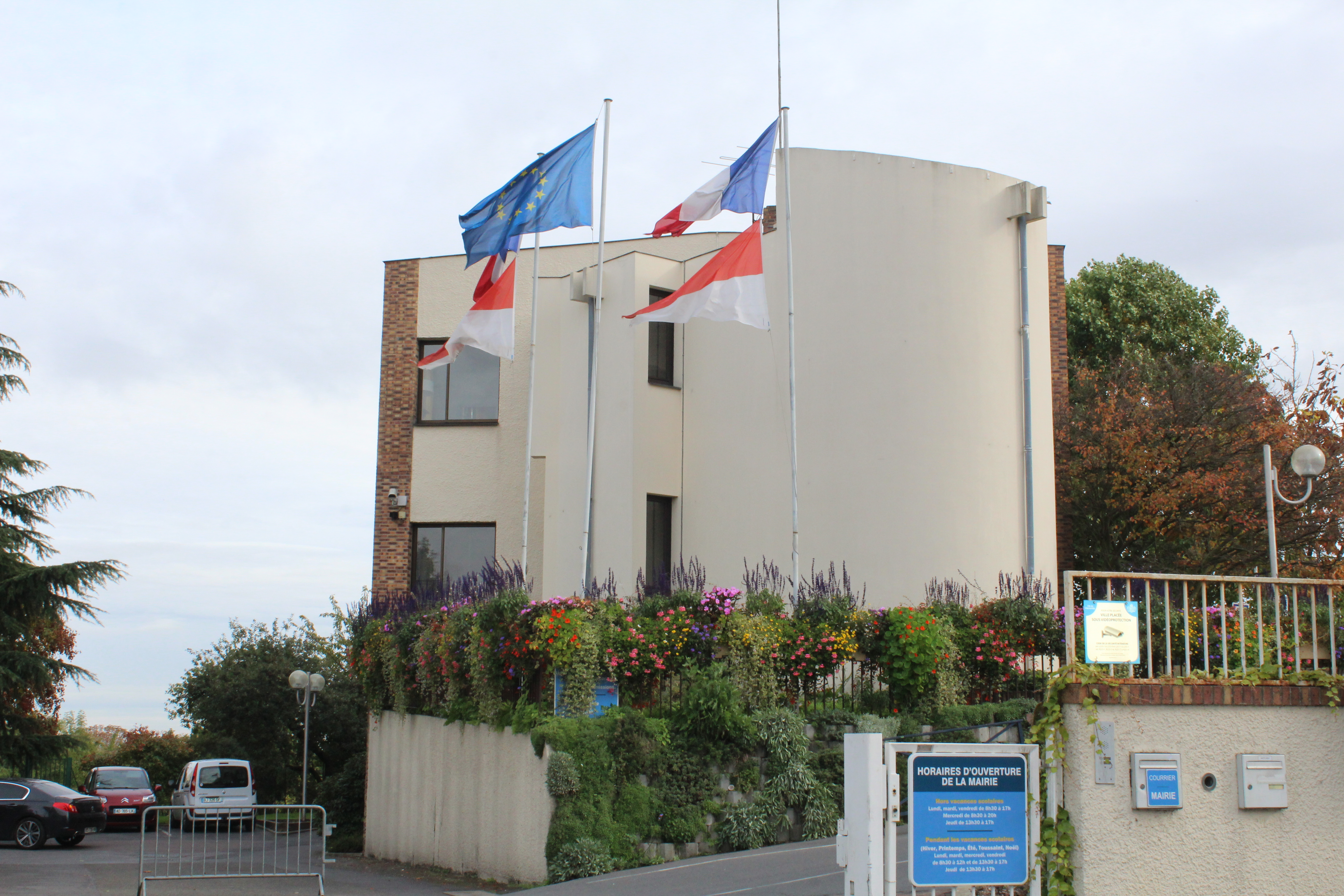
- The prominent western end of the Hôtel de Ville in October 2017

General information
- Type: City hall
- Architectural style: Modern style
- Location: Villemomble, France
- Coordinates: 48.8821°N 2.5078°E
- Completed: 1985

The Hôtel de Ville (French pronunciation: [otɛl də vil], City Hall) is a municipal building in Villemomble, Seine-Saint-Denis in the eastern suburbs of Paris, standing on Rue d'Avron.

== History ==
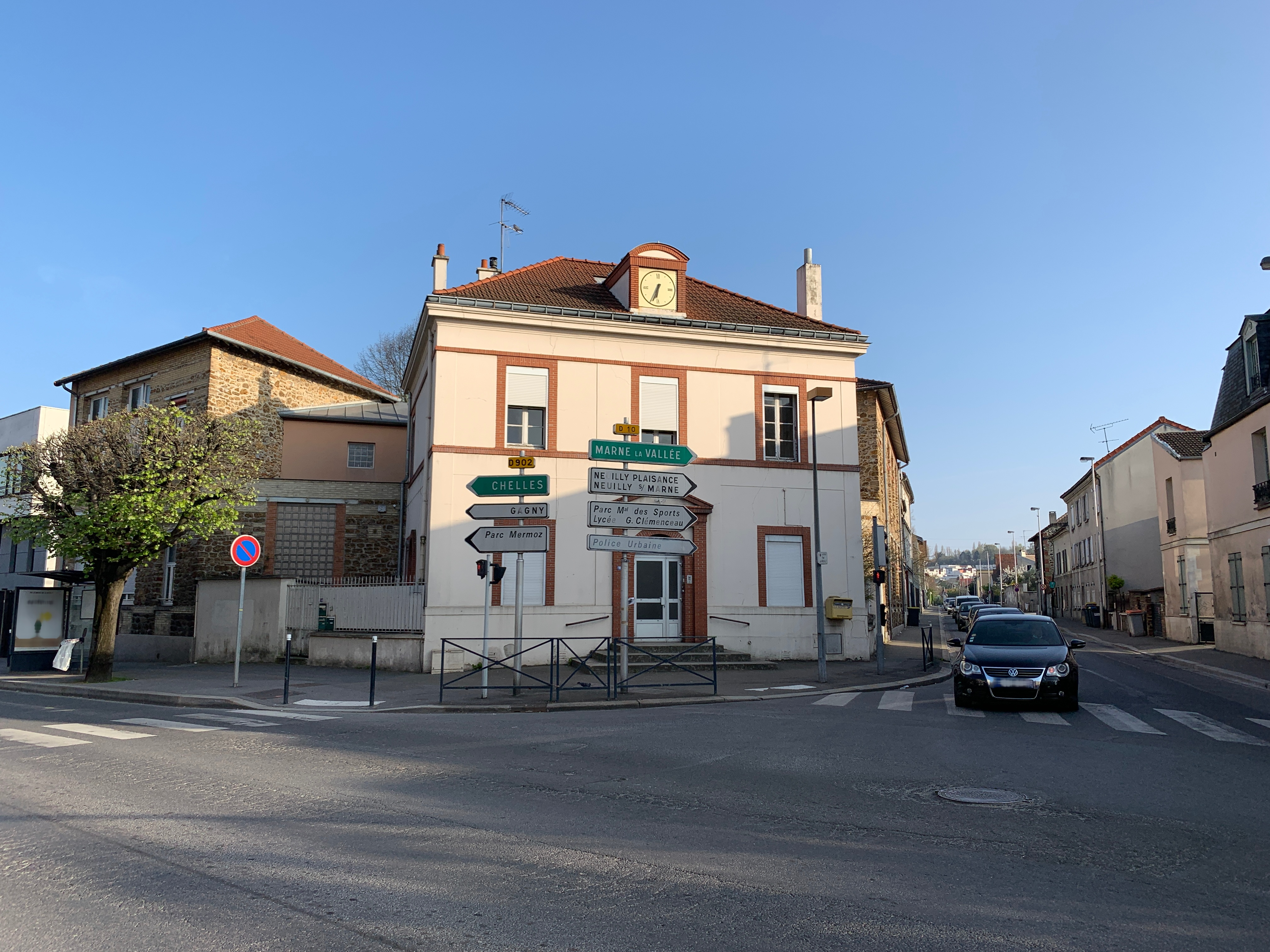
The combined town hall and school of 1848

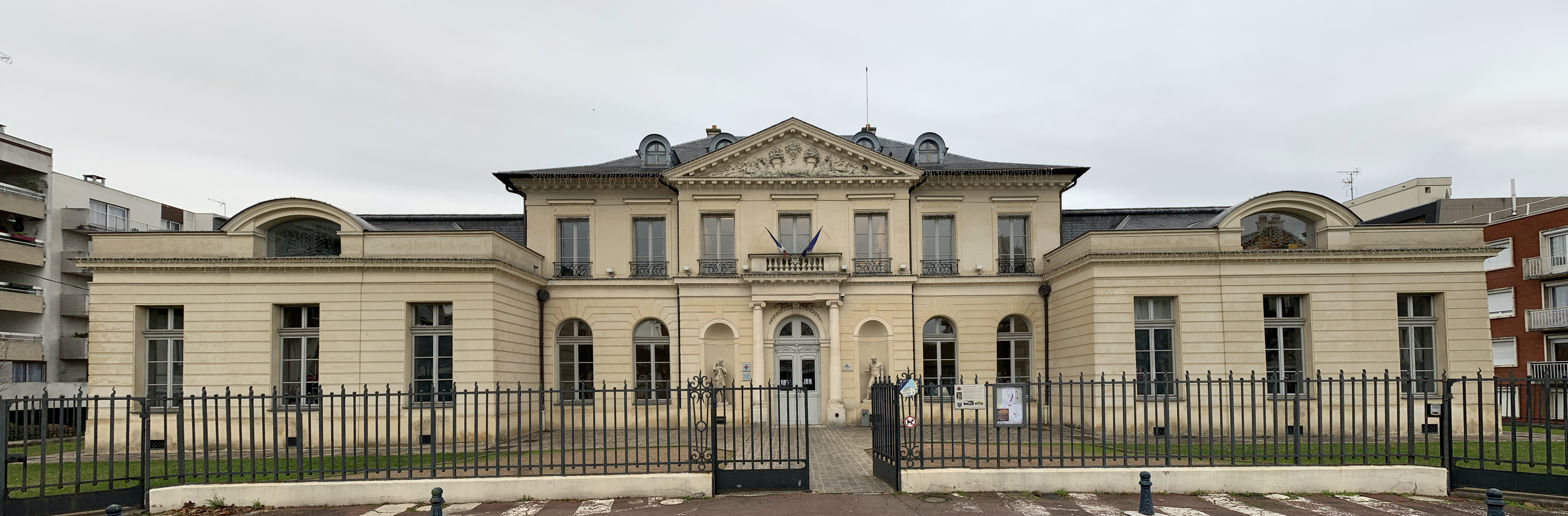
The Château de Villemomble

Following the French Revolution, the town council initially met in the house of the mayor at the time. This changed in 1833, when they established a combined town hall and school in a building on the corner of Grande Rue and Rue Joséphine (now Rue du Capitaine Louys).

In the 1840s, the council led by the mayor, René Christophe Chevre, decided to commission a newer building. The site they selected was on the opposite side of Grande Rue, on the corner with Rue de Neuilly. The building was designed by Claude Naissant in the neoclassical style, built in ashlar stone and was completed in 1848. The design involved a symmetrical main frontage of just three bays facing onto the corner of the two streets. The central bay contained a round headed doorway on the ground floor, a round headed window on the first floor and a clock above. The outer bays were fenestrated in a similar style. After the building was no longer required for municipal use, it continued to operate as a school, latterly as l'école maternelle Pasteur (the Pasteur Nursery School).

In 1870, during the Franco-Prussian War, the town was evacuated and a temporary town hall was established at Rue de Palestro in central Paris.

After the war, the mayor, Louis-Constantin Detouche, working in partnership with Madame Outrebon, acquired the Château de Villemomble on Place Émile Ducatte for the benefit of the town. The château had been commissioned by Louis Philippe I, Duke of Orléans for use by his mistress, Étiennette Le Marquis. The site he selected had been occupied by an earlier manor house. The château was designed by Alexandre-Théodore Brongniart in the neoclassical style, built in ashlar stone and was completed in 1769.

The design involved a symmetrical main frontage of 13 bays with the last three bays on each side projected forward to create wings. The central section of three bays, which was slightly projected forward, featured a porch, formed by a pair of Ionic order columns supporting an entablature. There was a French door with a balcony on the first floor and a modillioned pediment with a coat of arms in the tympanum across the central section. The other bays were fenestrated by round headed windows on the ground floor and by squared headed windows with cornices on the first floor. After Étiennette Le Marquis died in 1806, the château was owned by a succession of other people until the council moved into the building in 1880.

Following the Paris insurrection on 19 August 1944, during the Second World War, the French Resistance arrived at the town hall and posted a notice that the local liberation committee were taking possession of it. This was a week before the official liberation of the town by the French 2nd Armoured Division, commanded by General Philippe Leclerc, on 25 August 1944.

In the early 1980s, the council led by the mayor, Robert Calméjane, decided to commission a modern municipal building. The site they selected, on Rue d'Avron, was just to the south of the Bobigny to Sucy-Bonneuil railway line. The new building was designed in the modern style, built in brown brick and was completed in 1985. It was extended to the west with a new wing that was completed in 2005. The design of the new wing involved a distinctive semi-circular structure at the west end. Internally, the principal room in the building was the Salle du Conseil (council chamber).
