= Hôtel de Ville, Clichy-sous-Bois =

Town hall in Clichy-sous-Bois, France

Hôtel de Ville
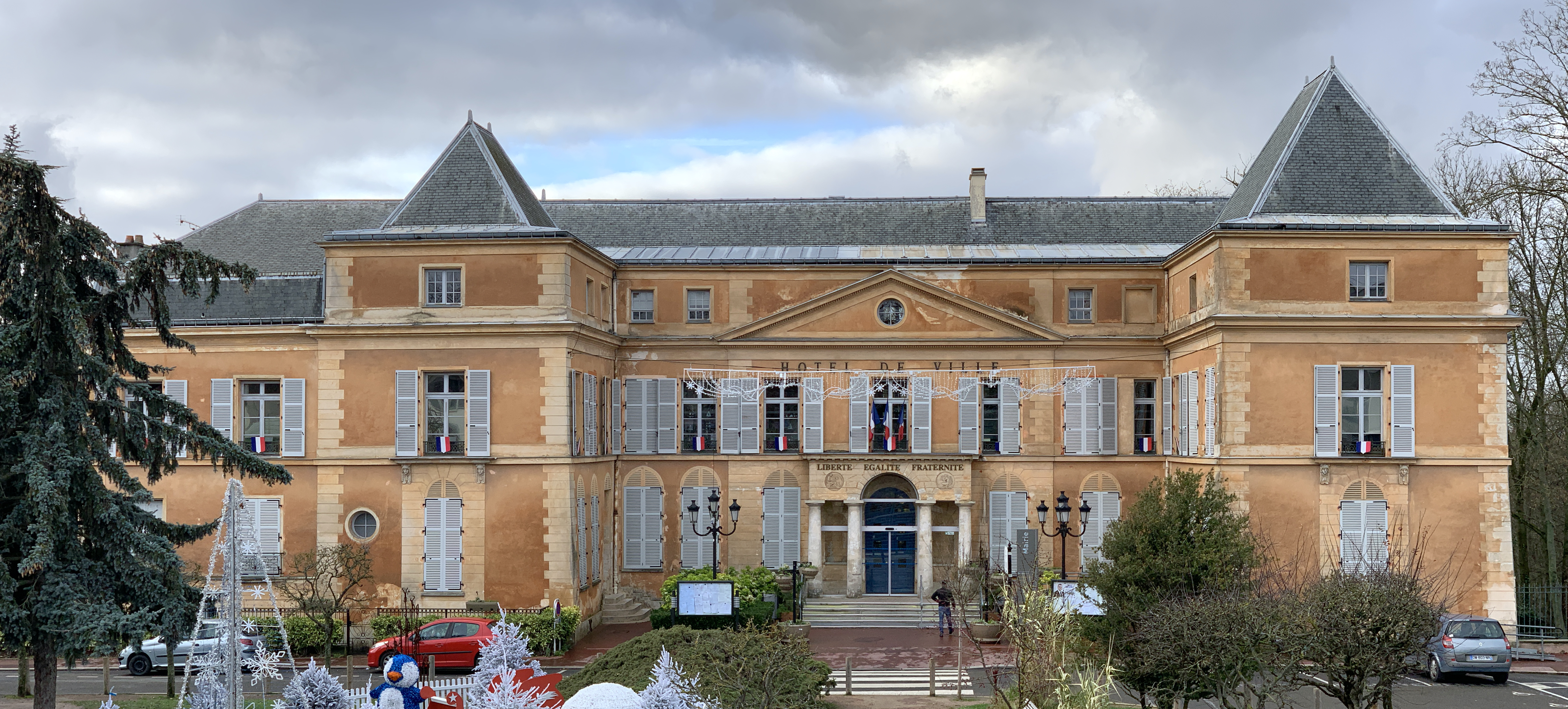
- The main frontage of the Hôtel de Ville in December 2019

General information
- Type: City hall
- Architectural style: Neoclassical style
- Location: Clichy-sous-Bois, France
- Coordinates: 48.9110°N 2.5458°E
- Completed: 1645

Monument historique
- Official name: Ancien château, actuellement mairie
- Type: Inscrit
- Designated: 1972
- Reference no.: PA00079931

The Hôtel de Ville (French pronunciation: [otɛl də vil], City Hall) is a municipal building in Clichy-sous-Bois, Seine-Saint-Denis, in the northeastern suburbs of Paris, standing on Place du 11 Novembre 1918. It was designated a monument historique by the French government in 1972.

== History ==
Following the French Revolution, the town council initially met in the house of the mayor at that time. This arrangement continued until the town council decided to commission and combined town hall and school in the mid-19th century.

In 1930, following significant population growth, the council led by the mayor, Frédéric Ladrette, decided to acquire a more substantial municipal building. The building they selected was the Château du Vicomte de Puységur. The château, in its earliest form, was commissioned as a hunting lodge by Jean de Chastenet de Puységur in around 1590. Gabrielle d'Estrées, acting in her role as mistress and confidante, hosted Henry IV there in the late 16th century.

The building was acquired by a captain in the French Army, Robert de Braguelongue, in 1645. De Braguelongue commissioned the current building shortly after acquiring the site. It was then sold to a diplomat, Count Jean-Antoine d'Avraux, who hosted Marie de Rabutin-Chantal, marquise de Sévigné, a prolific letter-writer, there in the second half of the 17th century. A tax collector to the king, Louis Dominique Lebas de Courmont, bought the building in 1752 and a financier, Charles Gayler, acquired it in 1796. Gayler commissioned Alexandre-Théodore Brongniart to lay out a formal park. It was then bought by a property owner, Martin-Louis Barmont, in 1807. Barmont commissioned significant alterations to the main frontage. The house later came into the ownership of the Lindet-Girard family from whom the council acquired it in 1930.

The design involved an asymmetrical main frontage of 11 bays facing onto what is now Place du 11 Novembre 1918, with the third and last bays projected forward as pavilions. The central section of three bays (the sixth, seventh and eighth bays) featured a portico formed by four Doric order columns supporting an entablature. There were three casement windows with shutters on the first floor and, above them, there was a pediment with a oculus in the tympanum. The other bays were fenestrated by casement windows.

On 29 August 1944, during the Second World War, just four days after the official liberation of the town by the French 2nd Armoured Division, commanded by General Philippe Leclerc, a guard, Léon Frenay, and two other individuals were killed in an accident involving a grenade launcher at the town hall.

The crime thriller, Les Misérables, was filmed in the town hall park in 2019.
