= Hôtel de Ville, Neuilly-sur-Marne =

Town hall in Neuilly-sur-Marne, France

Hôtel de Ville
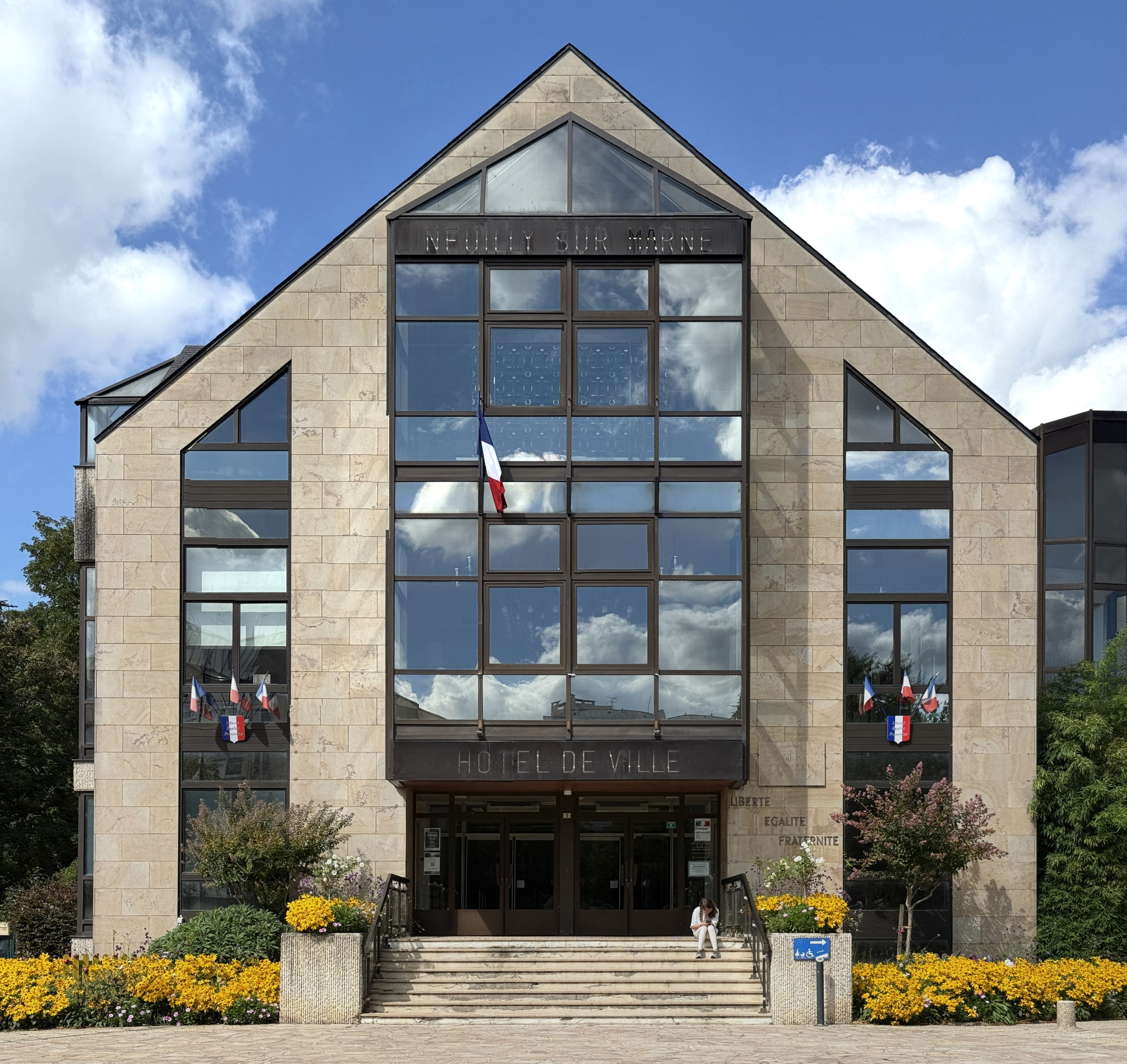
- The main frontage of the Hôtel de Ville in September 2025
- Interactive map of the Hôtel de Ville area

General information
- Type: City hall
- Architectural style: Modern style
- Location: Neuilly-sur-Marne, France
- Coordinates: 48.8567°N 2.5285°E
- Completed: 1987

The Hôtel de Ville (French pronunciation: [otɛl də vil], City Hall) is a municipal building in Neuilly-sur-Marne, Seine-Saint-Denis, in eastern suburbs of Paris, standing on Place François Mitterrand.

== History ==
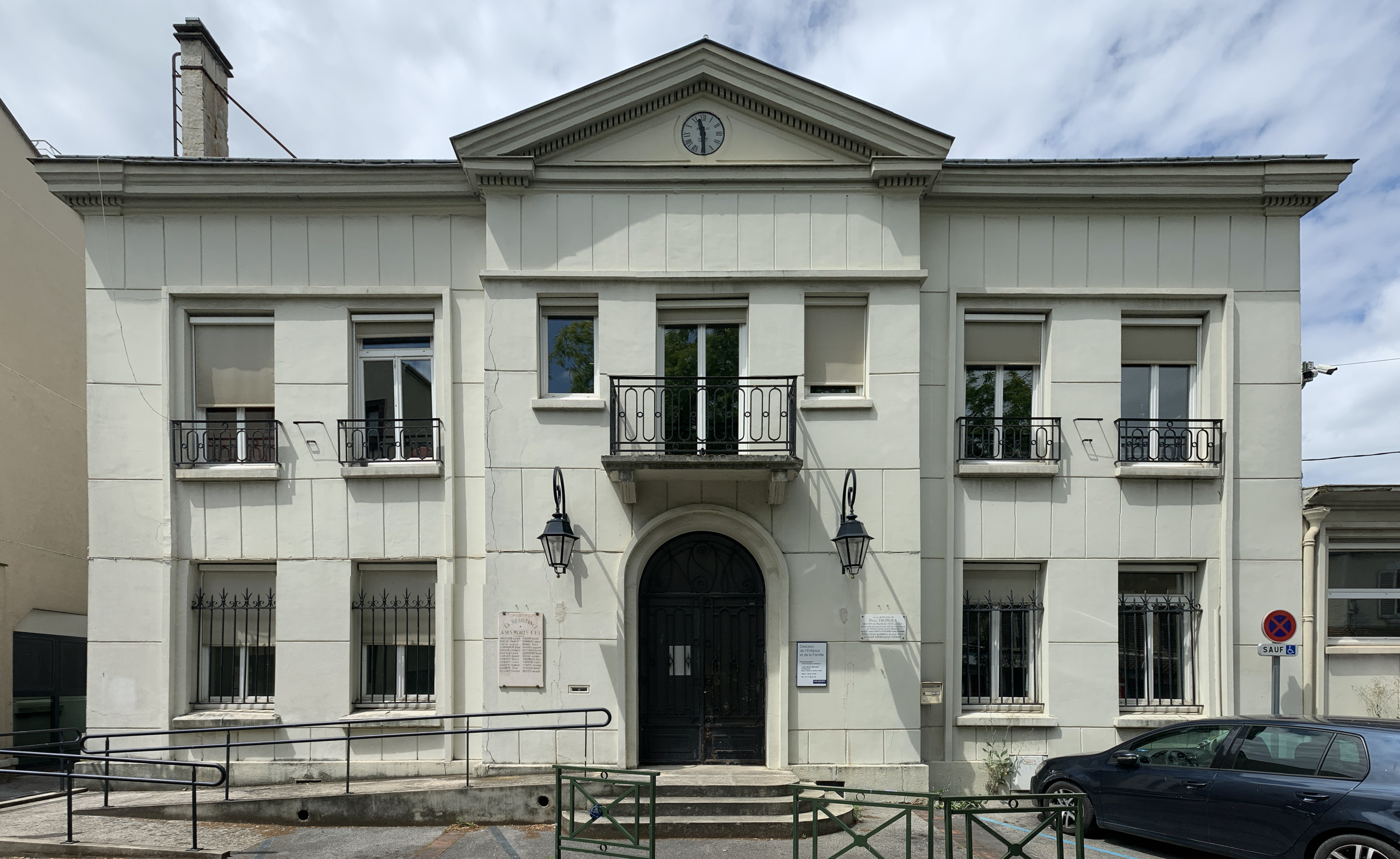
The old town hall

Following the French Revolution, meetings of the town council were originally held in the house of the mayor at the time. This arrangement continued until 1848, when the council led by the mayor, Eugène Marlan, decided to commission a combined town hall and school. The site they selected, on the north side of what is now Rue Émile Cossoneau, was occupied by a house known as "Au puits de Jacob" (At Jacob's Well). The building was designed by Sieur Bourgeois in the neoclassical style, built in ashlar stone and was completed in 1850.

The original design involved a symmetrical main frontage of seven bays facing onto the street. The central section of three bays, which was slightly projected forward, featured a round headed doorway flanked by a pair of round headed windows. There was a round headed French door with a balcony, flanked by two round headed windows, on the first floor, all surmounted by a pediment with a clock in the tympanum. The outer bays were fenestrated with casement windows which had iron railings on the first floor, and there was a cornice at roof level. There was originally a square tower behind the pediment. Internally, the classrooms were on the ground floor, and the council meeting rooms on the first floor.

The windows on the ground floor of the central section were later removed, the tower was demolished and the main frontage was reclad. The building was wholly taken over for municipal use after the school relocated to l’école du Centre (now école Louis-Amiard) in 1895.

During the Second World War, a former deputy mayor, Paul Thomoux, was killed by German troops while serving with the French Resistance at Celle-Lévescault in western France on 26 June 1944. After the town had been liberated by the French 2nd Armoured Division, commanded by General Philippe Leclerc, on 25 August 1944, a plaque to commemorate the lives of 24 local members of the French Forces of the Interior, who had died in the war, was fixed to the wall on the left of the doorway, while a plaque to commemorate Thomoux was fixed to the wall on the right of the doorway.

In the 1980s, following significant population growth, the council led by the mayor, Jacques Mahéas, decided to commission a modern town hall. The site they selected was on the north side of Avenue Général de Gaulle. The new building was designed in the modern style, built in concrete and glass and was completed in 1987. The layout involved two rectangular buildings offset at an angle to each other and connected by a semi-circular glass stairwell. The design of the southern building involved a main frontage of three bays facing onto Avenue Général de Gaulle with a gable above. The central bay featured a short flight of steps leading up to a glass entrance with a tall oriel window above. The outer bays contained tall strips of plate glass. Internally, the principal room was the Salle du Conseil (council chamber).
