= Blascosancho =

- municipality
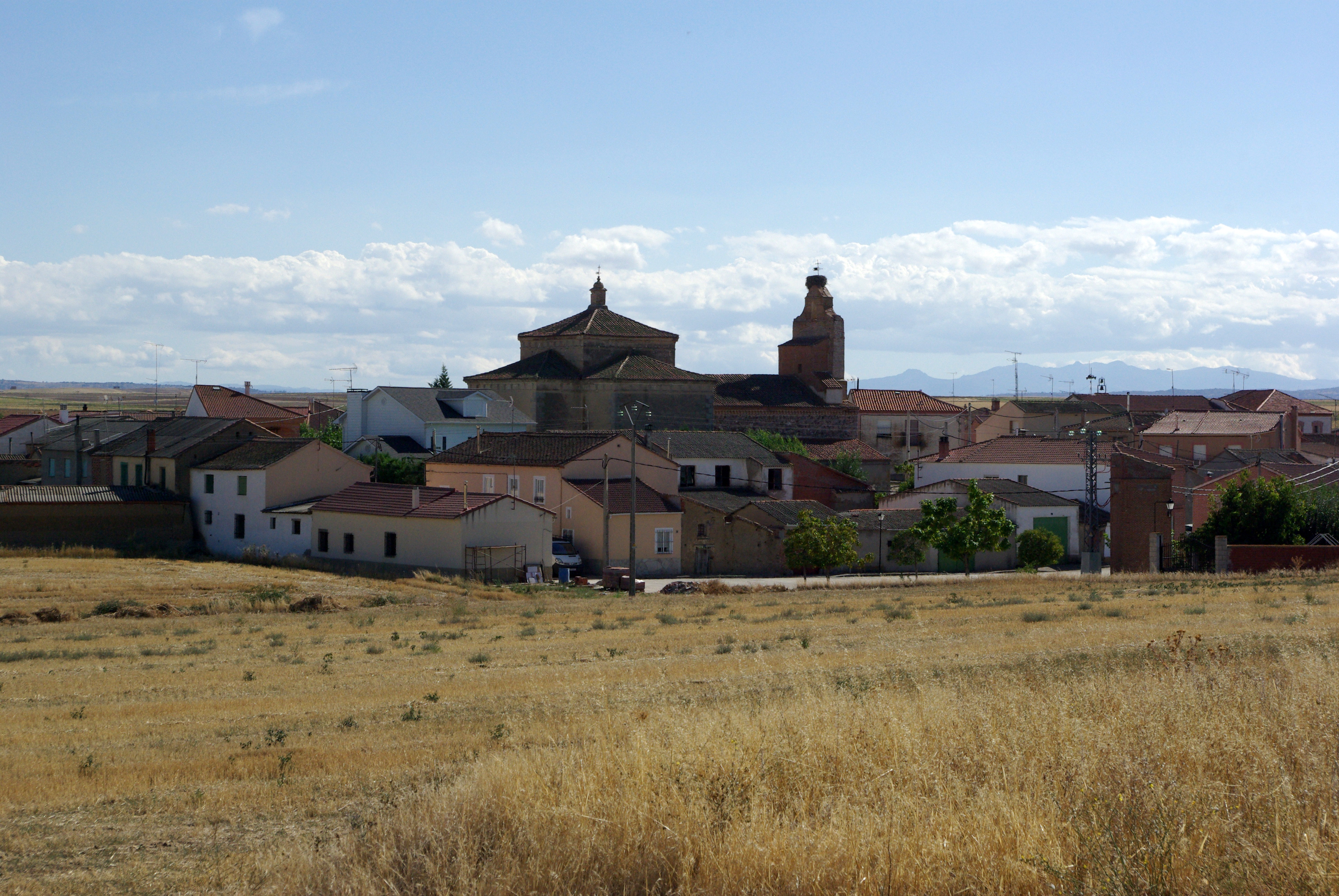
- Blascosnacho

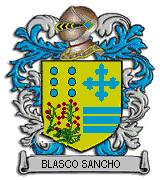
- Flag Coat of arms

- Extension of the municipal term within the province of Ávila

- Location in Spain. Blascosancho (Spain)
- Coordinates: 40°52′40″N 4°38′09″W
- Country: Spain
- Autonomous community: Castile and León
- Province: Ávila
- Municipality: Blascosancho

Area
  - Total: 22.95 km^{2} (8.86 sq mi)
- Elevation: 904 m (2,966 ft)

Population (2025-01-01)
  - Total: 85
  - Density: 3.7/km^{2} (9.6/sq mi)
- Time zone: UTC+1 (CET)
  - Summer (DST): UTC+2 (CEST)
- Website: Official website

Blascosancho is a municipality located in the province of Ávila, Castile and León, Spain.

== Population ==
Historical population
Year	Pop.	±% p.a.
2023	106	—
2024	100	−5.66%
2025	85	−15.00%
Source: INE
