= Moraleja de Matacabras =

- municipality
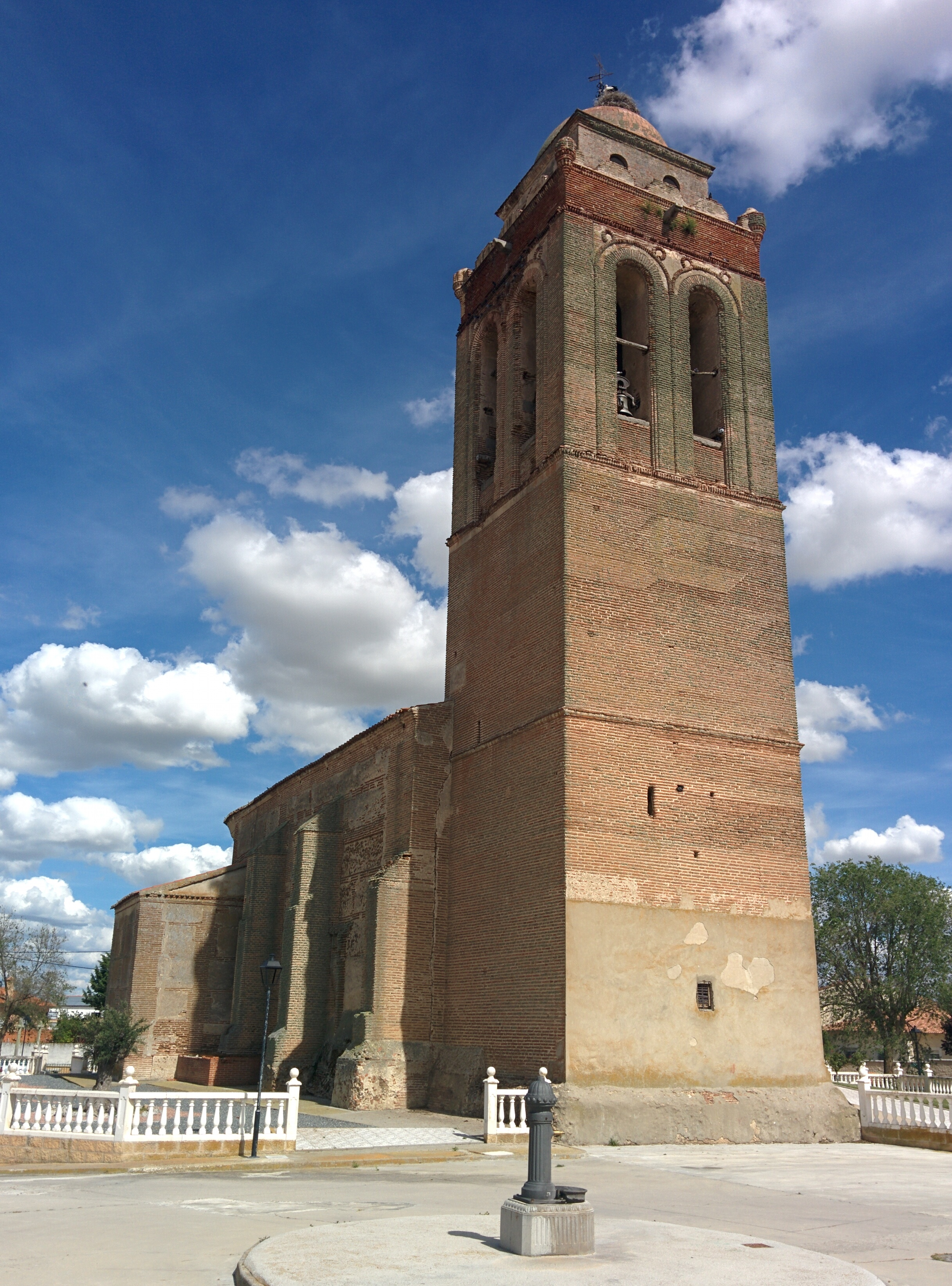

- Flag Coat of arms

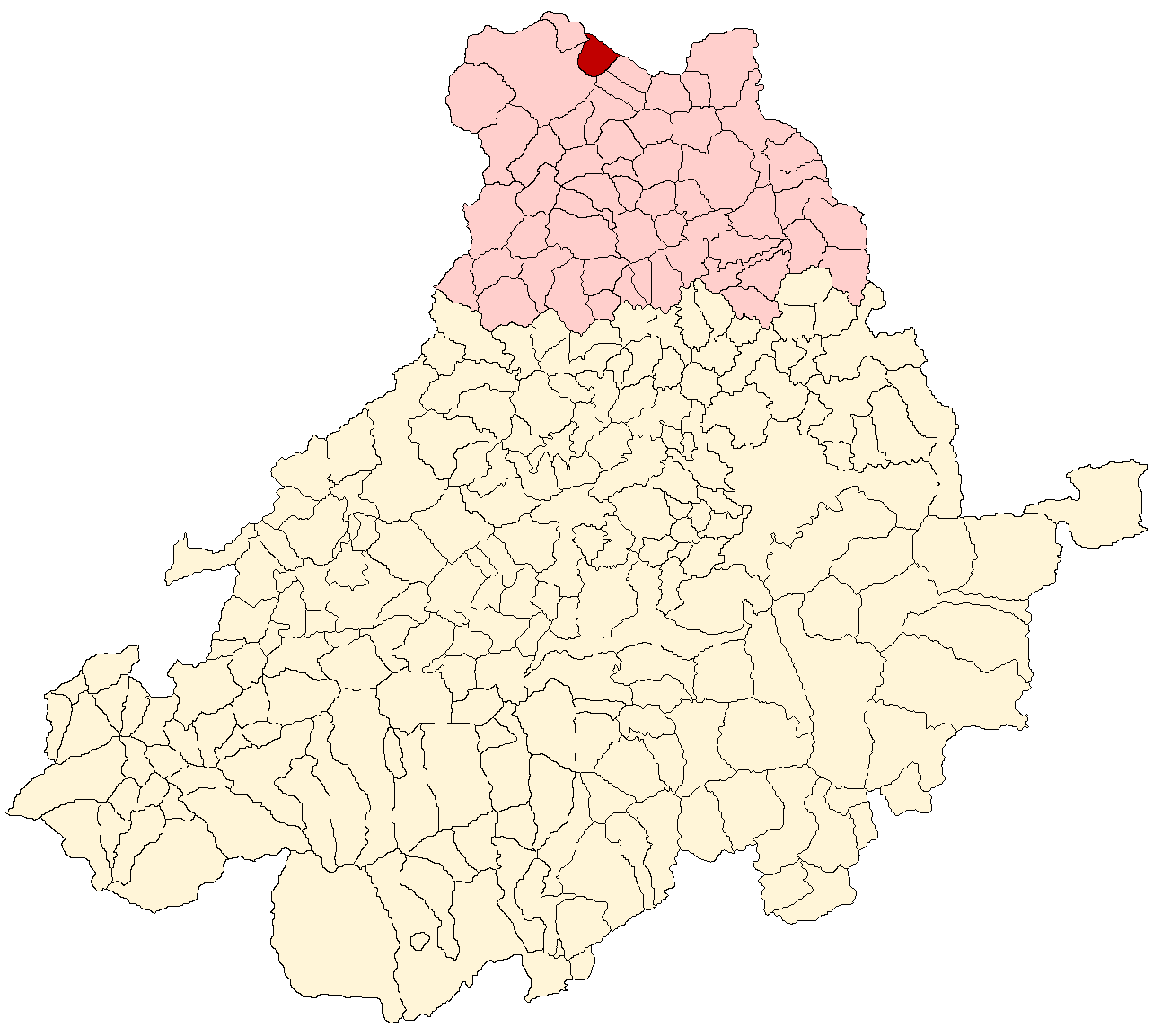

- Location in Spain. Moraleja de Matacabras (Spain)
- Coordinates: 41°06′26″N 4°57′27″W
- Country: Spain
- Autonomous community: Castile and León
- Province: Ávila

Area
  - Total: 14 km^{2} (5.4 sq mi)

Population (2025-01-01)
  - Total: 55
  - Density: 3.9/km^{2} (10/sq mi)
- Time zone: UTC+1 (CET)
  - Summer (DST): UTC+2 (CEST)
- Website: Official website

Moraleja de Matacabras is a municipality located in the province of Ávila within the autonomous community Castile and León, Spain.

== Population ==
Historical population
Year	Pop.	±% p.a.
2023	53	—
2024	53	+0.00%
2025	55	+3.77%
Source: INE
