= Clichy-sous-Bois =

- Commune
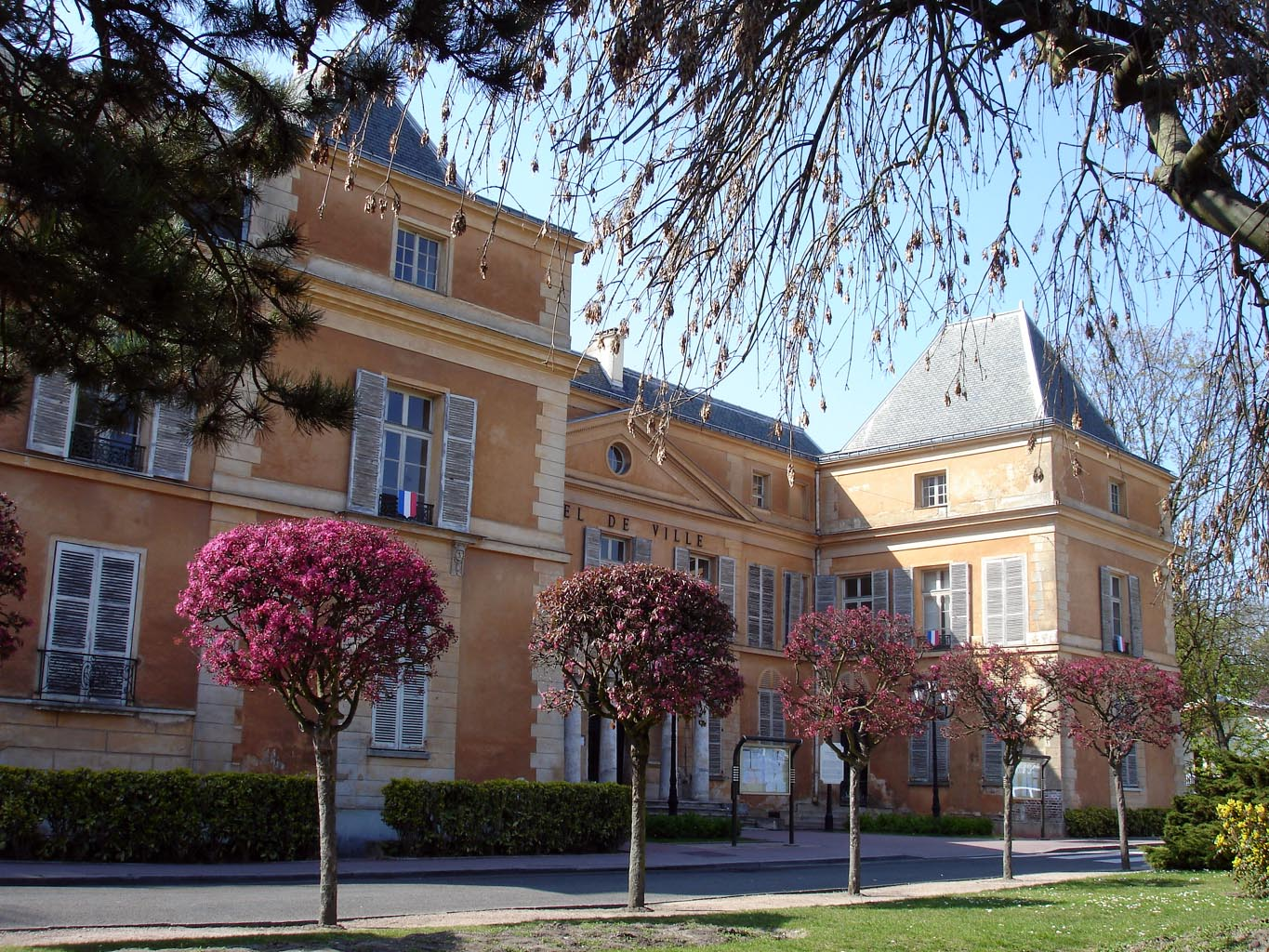
- The Hôtel de Ville

- Coat of arms

- Location (in red) within Paris inner suburbs
- Location of Clichy-sous-Bois
- Location within France Location within Île-de-France (region)
- Coordinates: 48°54′37″N 2°33′12″E
- Country: France
- Region: Île-de-France
- Department: Seine-Saint-Denis
- Arrondissement: Le Raincy
- Canton: Livry-Gargan
- Intercommunality: Grand Paris

Government
  - Mayor (2026–32): Olivier Klein
- Area^{1}: 3.95 km^{2} (1.53 sq mi)
- Elevation: 98 m (322 ft)
- Highest elevation: 121 m (397 ft)
- Lowest elevation: 66 m (217 ft)
- Population (2023): 29,354
  - Density: 7,430/km^{2} (19,200/sq mi)
- Time zone: UTC+01:00 (CET)
  - Summer (DST): UTC+02:00 (CEST)
- INSEE/Postal code: 93014 /93390
- ^{1} French Land Register data, which excludes lakes, ponds, glaciers > 1 km^{2} (0.386 sq mi or 247 acres) and river estuaries.

Clichy-sous-Bois (French pronunciation: [kliʃi su bwɑ]) is a commune in the eastern suburbs of Paris. It is located 15 kilometres (9.3 mi) from central Paris.

Clichy-sous-Bois is not served by any motorway, major road, or railway and therefore continues to be one of the most isolated of Paris' inner suburbs. It is one of the most economically disadvantaged suburbs as well and the 2005 civil unrest and riots began there, which subsequently spread nationwide.

== Geography ==
Clichy-sous-Bois has an area of 3.95 km^{2} (1.53 sq mi) with 1.1 km^{2} (0.42 sq mi) of woods. The woods are remnants of the Bondy wood (Forêt Départementale de Bondy, Parc de la Fosse Maussoin, Parc de la Mairie).

== History ==
The name of Clichy-sous-Bois comes from Roman Cleppius, seventh century Clippiacum superius, twelfth century Clichiacum.

Flint tools from the Neolithic era have been found there. Clichy en Aulnois belonged to the lords of Livry in the early Middle Ages. Subject to the Knights Templar in the 13th century, Clichy then passed into possession of the Knights Hospitaller order. Until the 16th century, it was a hunting resort of the French kings.

The Hôtel de Ville was built as a private residence and completed in 1645.

In the 18th century, it belonged to the Duc d'Orléans. In 1820, the village had about 150 people.

On 20 May 1869, a part of the territory of Clichy-sous-Bois was detached and merged with a part of the territory of Livry-Gargan and a small part of the territory of Gagny to create the commune of Le Raincy.

In 1870, Clichy was affected by the Franco-Prussian War.

=== Heraldry ===
Arms of Clichy-sous-Bois	The arms of Clichy-sous-Bois are blazoned : Per pale vert and argent, a cinqfoil counterchanged, and on a chief gules a latin cross voided between two bunches of grapes slipped and leaved argent.

== Crime and civil unrest ==
Clichy-sous-Bois has a high unemployment rate (about 20%) compared to the rest of the country and 40% for people under 25 years old.

The suburban riots of October 2005 originated in Clichy-sous-Bois after the accidental deaths of two local Muslim youths who had been escaping a police control. The riots spread to other communes of the department and then to virtually every major urban area in France.

== Demography ==
As of 2015 the majority of its population is of African heritage. As of 2015 the youth unemployment rate was 40%.

Historical population

Year	Pop.	±% p.a.
1793	161	—
1821	137	−0.57%
1846	168	+0.82%
1872	182	+0.31%
1881	251	+3.64%
1891	452	+6.06%
1901	672	+4.05%
1906	1,071	+9.77%
1911	1,434	+6.01%
1921	2,104	+3.91%
1926	3,467	+10.50%
1931	4,026	+3.03%
1936	4,056	+0.15%

Year	Pop.	±% p.a.
1946	3,573	−1.26%
1954	5,105	+4.56%
1962	11,606	+10.81%
1968	16,357	+5.89%
1975	22,422	+4.61%
1982	24,654	+1.36%
1990	28,180	+1.68%
1999	28,288	+0.04%
2007	29,674	+0.60%
2012	30,720	+0.70%
2017	29,348	−0.91%
2023	29,354	+0.00%

Source: EHESS and INSEE (1968-2023)

=== Immigration ===
Place of birth of residents of Clichy-sous-Bois in 1999
Born in metropolitan France	Born outside metropolitan France			
63.7%	36.3%			
63.7%	Born in overseas France	Born in foreign countries with French citizenship at birth^{1}	EU-15 immigrants^{2}	Non-EU-15 immigrants
63.7%	2.6%	2.0%	4.0%	27.7%
^{1} This group is made up largely of former French settlers, such as pieds-noirs in Northwest Africa, followed by former colonial citizens who had French citizenship at birth (such as was often the case for the native elite in French colonies), as well as to a lesser extent foreign-born children of French expatriates. A foreign country is understood as a country not part of France in 1999, so a person born for example in 1950 in Algeria, when Algeria was an integral part of France, is nonetheless listed as a person born in a foreign country in French statistics.^{2} An immigrant is a person born in a foreign country not having French citizenship at birth. An immigrant may have acquired French citizenship since moving to France, but is still considered an immigrant in French statistics. On the other hand, persons born in France with foreign citizenship (the children of immigrants) are not listed as immigrants.

As of 2009 33% of the commune's residents were foreign nationals, higher than both the departmental average and the French national average.

== Transport ==
Clichy-sous-Bois is not served directly by any station of the Paris Métro, RER, or suburban rail network. Since 2019, it has been directly served by the T4 Tramway, which connects to the Le Raincy – Villemomble – Montfermeil station on Paris RER line E. Before the opening of the tramway, it was claimed the time needed to travel via public transport to the city centre of Paris is about 1.5 hours.

Rail service is expected to directly serve the commune by 2026 with the planned Clichy-Montfermeil station of the under construction Line 16 of the Paris Métro.

== Economy ==
As of 2007 the unemployment rate was around 20%. It was close to 50% in the housing estates which were defined by The Economist as "the worst."

== Politics ==
In 2007, voter turnout for the presidential election in Clichy was 82%.

== Education ==
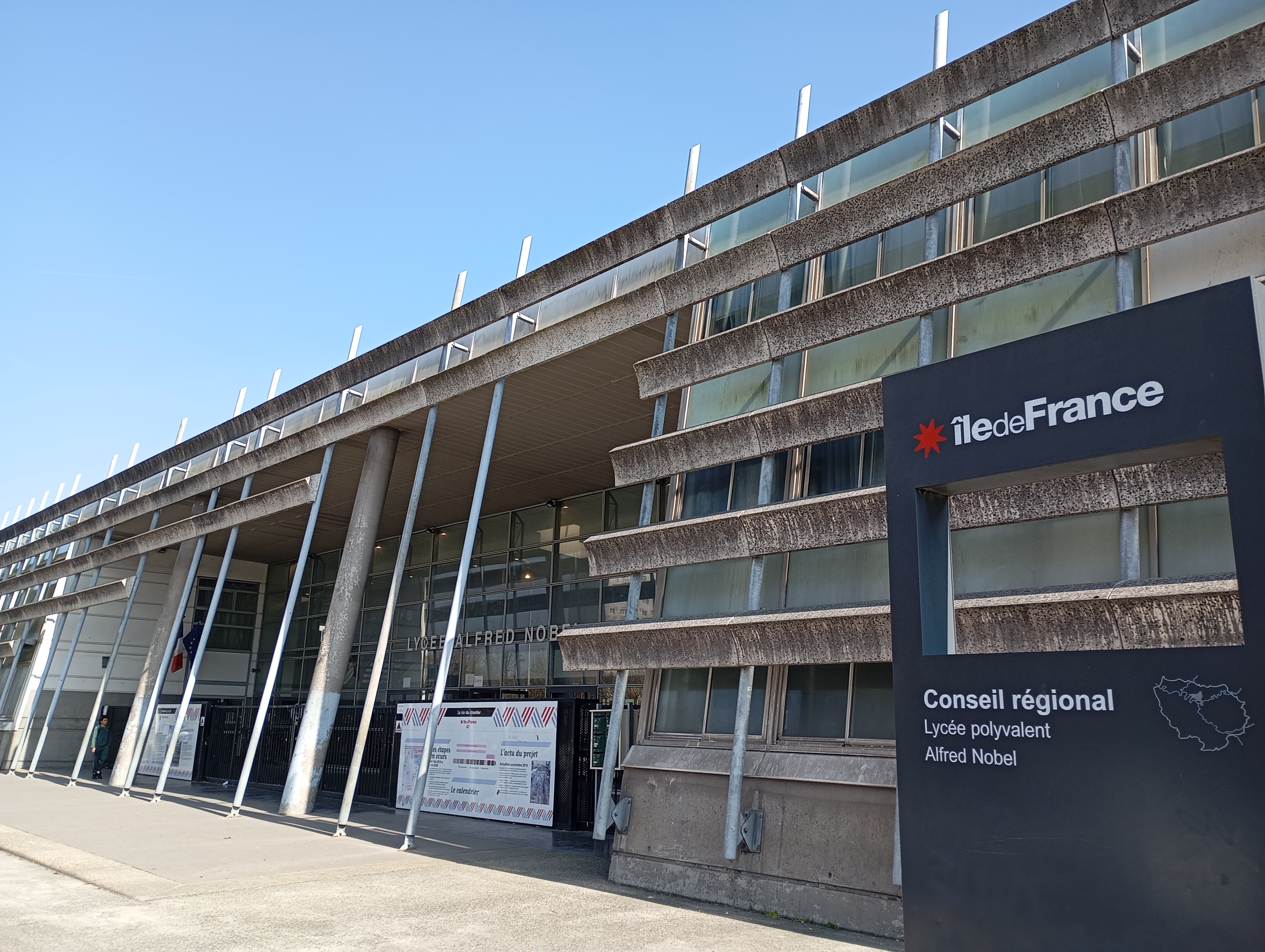
Lycée Alfred-Nobel

There are twelve preschool sites, and eleven elementary school sites.

As of 2016 there are about 2,500 students in Clichy's four secondary schools. The junior high schools in the commune are:

- Collège Romain-Rolland
- Collège Louise-Michel
- Collège Robert-Doisneau
  - The construction of this junior high relieved Louise-Michel, which saw its student population decline from about 1,200 in 2004 to over 500 in 2012.

The sole senior high school/sixth form college in Clichy is Lycée Alfred-Nobel. As of 2007 the lycée has 1,100 students. It has an agreement with the Institut d'études politiques de Paris (Sciences-Po) which allows applicants from the school to gain entrance to the university without taking the entrance examination. As of 2007 three students from the lycée were admitted.

== Personalities linked to the commune ==
- Roberto Alagna, tenor singer
- Fatima Daas, author
- Claude Dilain, politician
- Olivier Klein, politician
- Mamadou Samassa, footballer
- Ossean Barbès, actress

== See also ==
- Communes of the Seine-Saint-Denis department
