= Lycée Alfred Nobel =

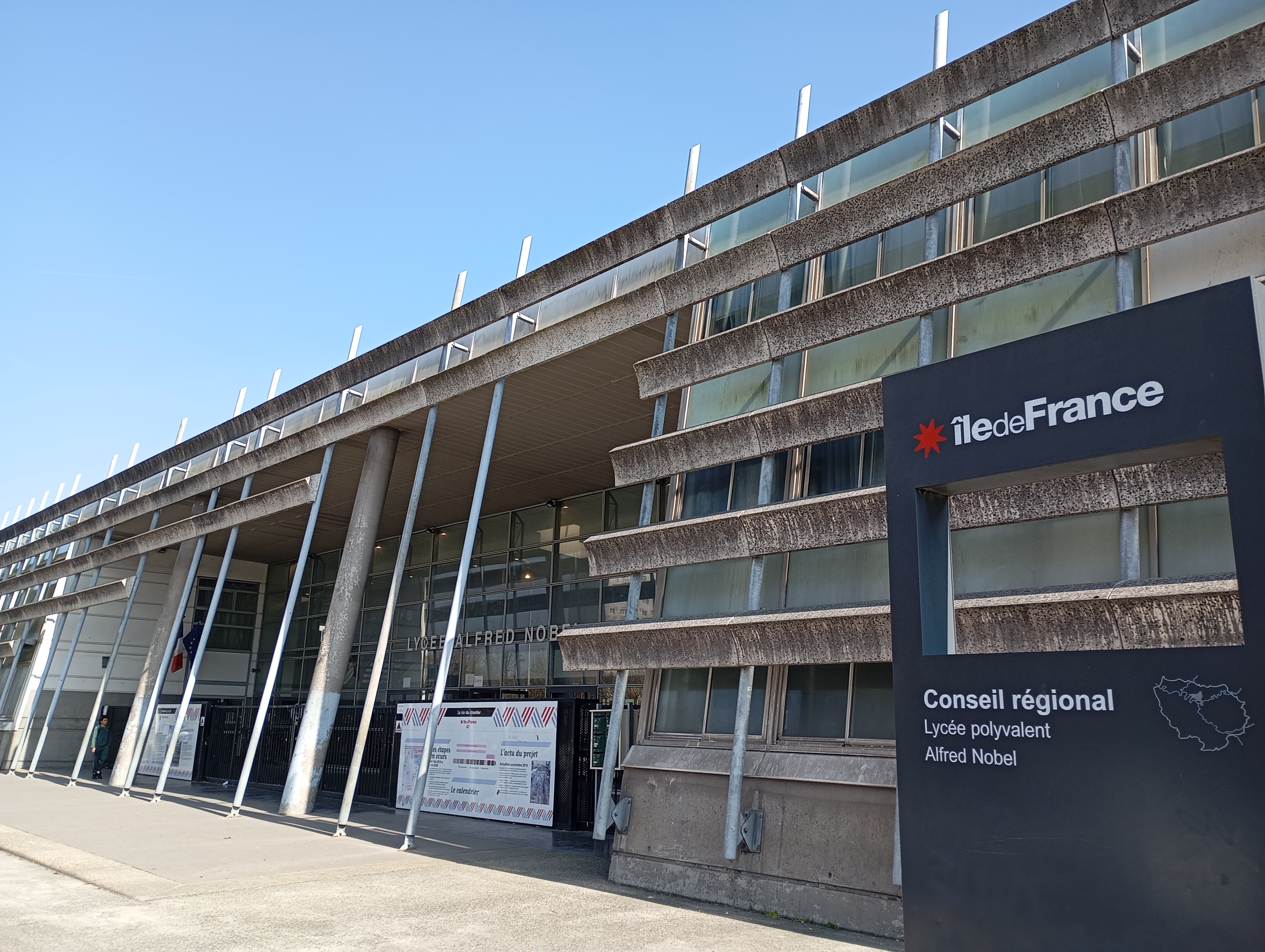
- Main entrance

Location
- 20, allée de Gagny 93390 Clichy-sous-Bois
- Coordinates: 48.90251600000001°N 2.547938899999963°E

Information
- Type: Public high school
- Grades: 2nde-Terminale (US grades 10-12)
- Website: lyceenobelclichy.fr

Lycée Alfred Nobel is the senior high school/sixth-form college in Clichy-sous-Bois, Seine-Saint-Denis, France, in the Paris metropolitan area. As of 2018 Nicole Ozeray is the head of the school.

It has an agreement with the Institut d'études politiques de Paris (Sciences-Po) which allows applicants from the school to gain entrance to the university without taking the entrance examination. As of 2007 three students from the lycée had been admitted.

The school also operates a vocational educational programme involving travel to Asia and Africa and transdisciplinary projects in association with Bouygues, IBM, and other major companies.

== History ==
As of 2007 in France normally sixth-form/senior high school students are required to enroll in sixth-form colleges/senior high schools within their communes and/or serving their communes. As of that year students in Clichy-sous-Bois used the art history programme at Lycée Albert-Schweitzer in Le Raincy to avoid enrolling at Nobel. As of 2016 students avoiding Nobel attended senior high schools in Chelles, Le Raincy, and Vaujours. Veronique Soulé of Libération referred to Nobel as a "lycée ghetto".

In 2018 Le Parisien ranked Nobel at the top of a list of high schools by student improvement.

== Demographics ==
As of 2007 the lycée had 1,100 students, with about 70% coming from disadvantaged backgrounds. By 2016 the enrollment remained constant. The students reside in Clichy and surrounding municipalities. As of 2016 73% of the students come from low income backgrounds. As of 2009 most students came from immigrant backgrounds; During that year the ethnic origins of the students were: 42.8% North African, 22.2% European, 18.3% black African, 12.7% Turkish, and 4% Asian.

As of 2016 there were 150 employees. As of 2009 about 25% of the teachers had North African or black African heritage. The ethnic origins of the teachers that year were: 71.3% European, 26.9% North African, and 1.8% black African.

== Campus ==
The school campus, with a total of 13,455 square metres (144,830 sq ft) of green and wooded space, has five buildings. The buildings are made of concrete and have large windows.

== Note ==
- Some material originated from "Clichy-sous-Bois"
