= Pozaldez =

Coordinates: 41°22′N 4°50′W

Pozaldez, Spain
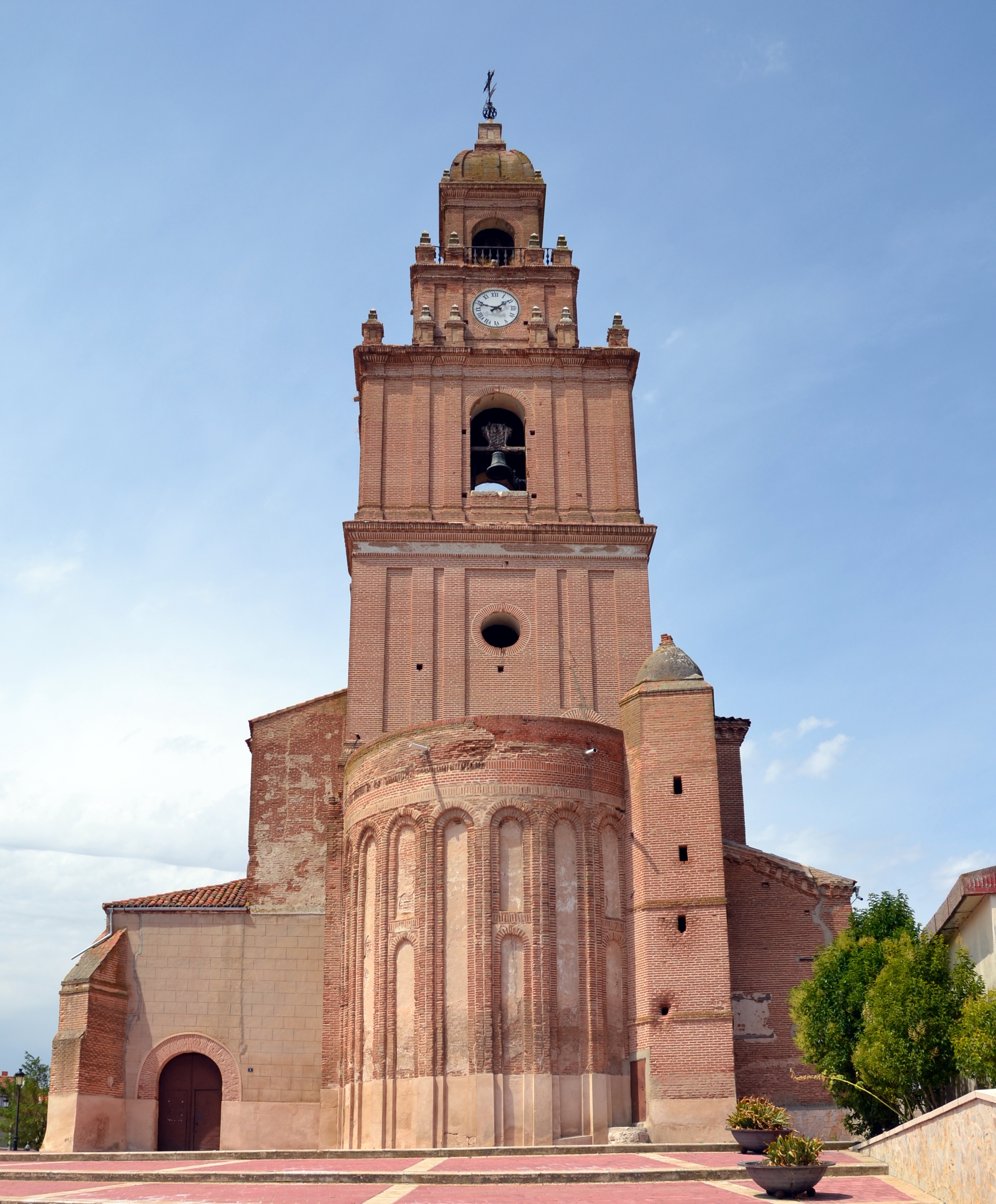
- Church of San Boal of Pozaldez, Valladolid, Spain
- Interactive map of Pozaldez, Spain
- Country: Spain
- Autonomous community: Castile and León
- Province: Valladolid
- Municipality: Pozaldez

Government
  - Mayor: Eduardo Ibáñez Palacio

Area
  - Total: 27 km^{2} (10 sq mi)

Population (2025-01-01)
  - Total: 503
  - Density: 19/km^{2} (48/sq mi)
- Time zone: UTC+1 (CET)
  - Summer (DST): UTC+2 (CEST)

Pozaldez is a municipality located in the province of Valladolid, Castile and León, Spain. According to the 2004 census (INE), the municipality has a population of 497 inhabitants. The mayor is Eduardo Ibáñez Palacio and has been the mayor since 1991. The town has three significant monuments: two churches and 18th century fountain ("El Caño"). A regionally and nationally known personality from Pozaldez was "Luisito de Pozaldez" known as the last jester. Pozaldez is also known for its wines. It is located on the Rueda region, and has great Verdejo wine.

Architecture
Pozaldez is part of the tradition of Almudejar construction. One of the churches is represented in the Mudejar Parque Tematico in nearby Olmedo.

Links
Pozaldez Official Site
Luisito de Pozaldez: The Last Jester
Parque Temático Mudejar
