= Moraleja de las Panaderas =

Coordinates: 41°17′N 4°49′W

Moraleja de las Panaderas, Spain
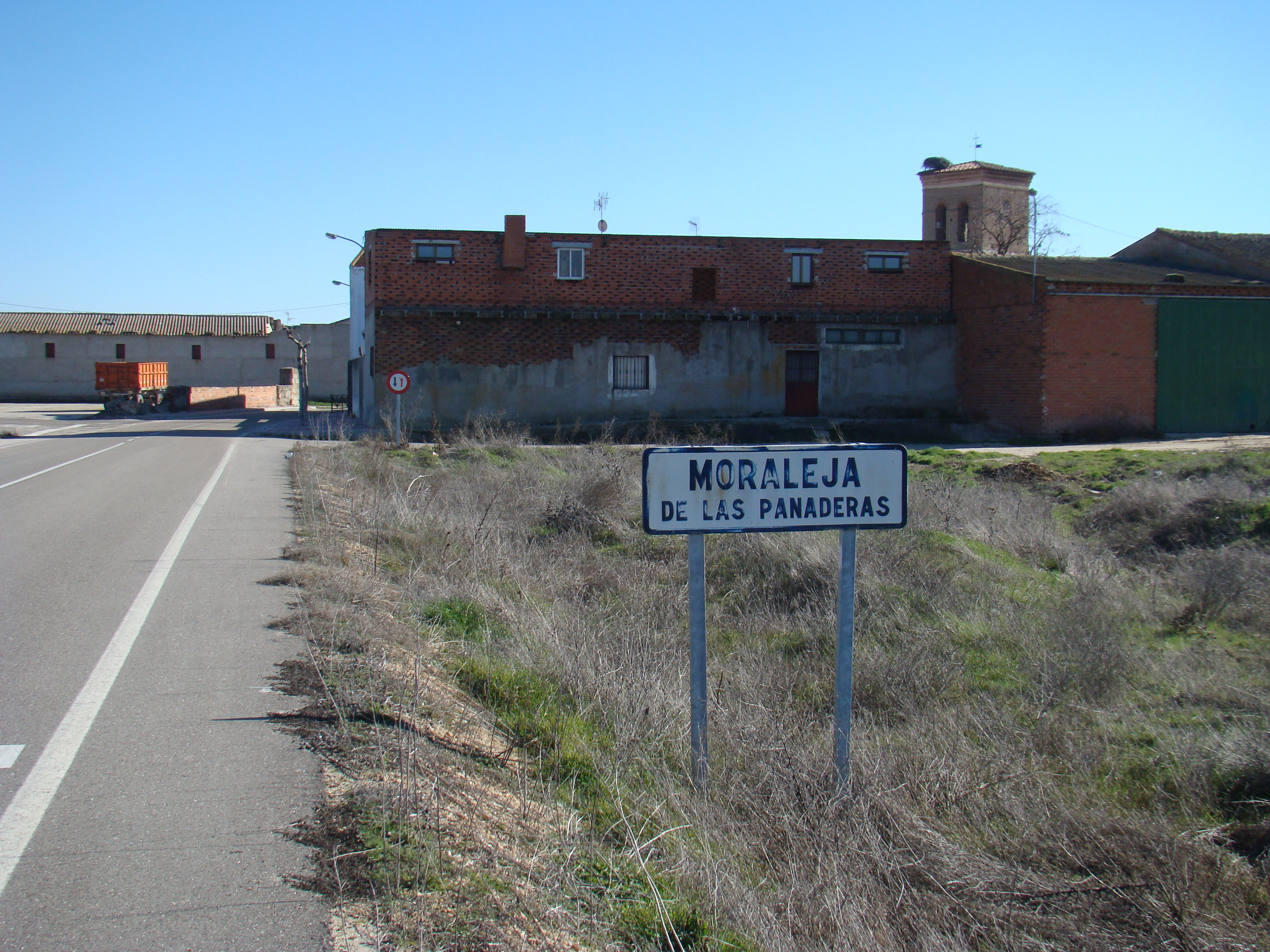
- Country: Spain
- Autonomous community: Castile and León
- Province: Valladolid
- Municipality: Moraleja de las Panaderas

Area
  - Total: 15.34 km^{2} (5.92 sq mi)

Population (2025-01-01)
  - Total: 42
  - Density: 2.7/km^{2} (7.1/sq mi)
- Time zone: UTC+1 (CET)
  - Summer (DST): UTC+2 (CEST)

Moraleja de las Panaderas is a municipality located in the province of Valladolid, Castile and León, Spain. According to the 2004 census (INE), the municipality has a population of 34 inhabitants.
