= Lycée Georges Clemenceau (Villemomble) =

Lycée Georges-Clemenceau

Information
- Type: Public high school

Lycée Georges Clemenceau is a senior high school in Villemomble, Seine-Saint-Denis, France, in the Paris metropolitan area.

The school opened in 1946 as an annex of Lycée Charlemagne (now Lycée Albert Schweitzer) in Le Raincy. On 1 January 1961 it became its own high school.
