= Villemomble =

- Commune
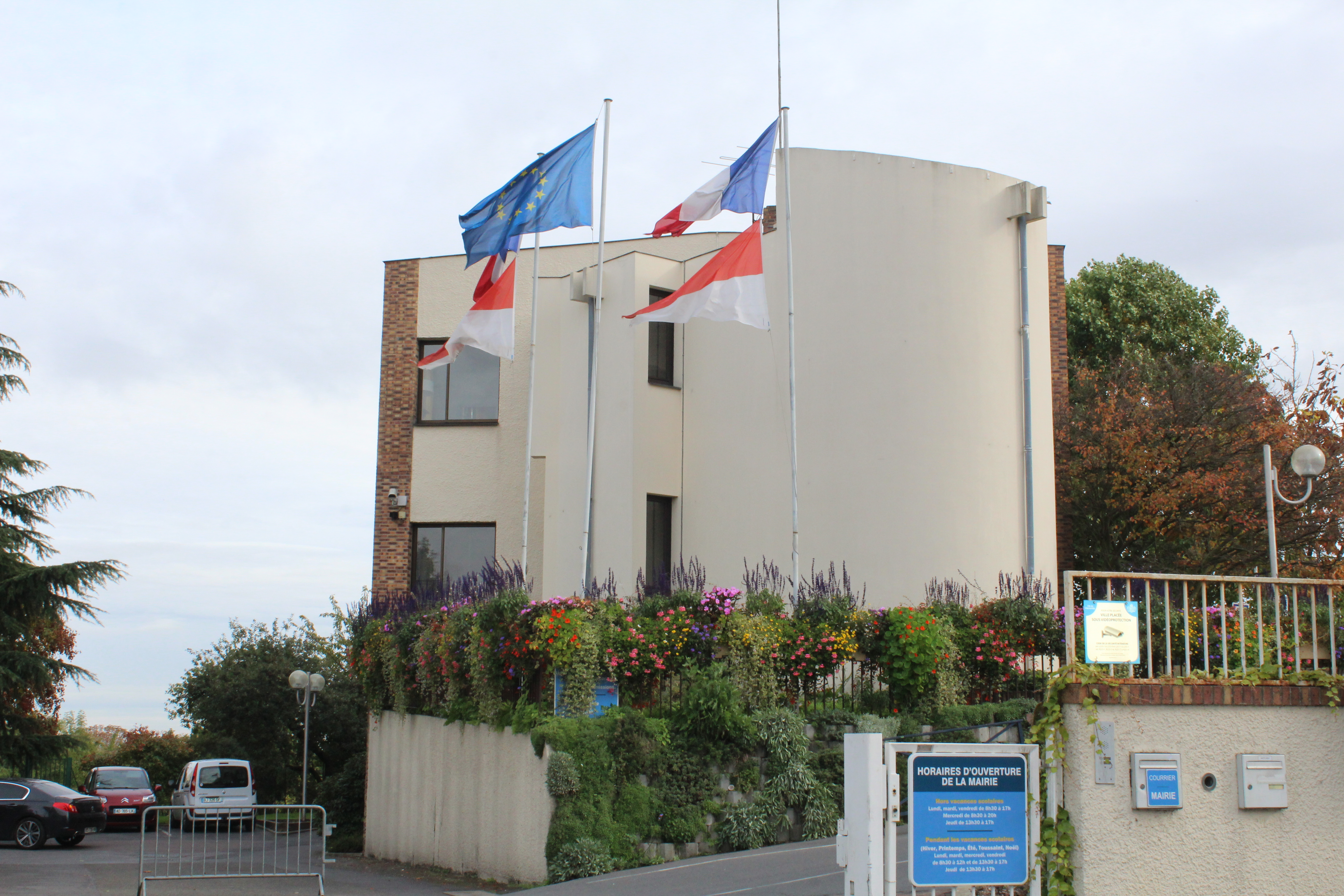
- The Hôtel de Ville

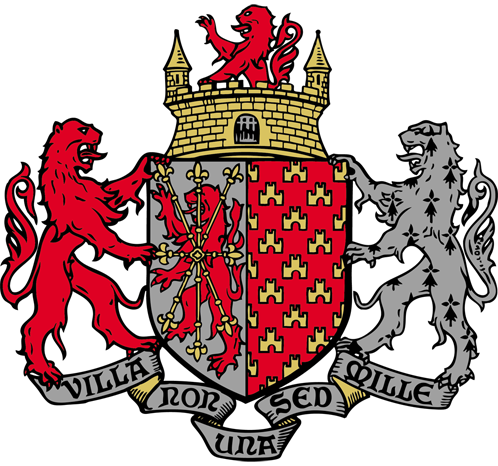
- Coat of arms

- Location (in red) within Paris inner suburbs
- Location of Villemomble
- Location within France Location within Île-de-France (region)
- Coordinates: 48°53′00″N 2°30′00″E
- Country: France
- Region: Île-de-France
- Department: Seine-Saint-Denis
- Arrondissement: Le Raincy
- Canton: Villemomble
- Intercommunality: Grand Paris

Government
  - Mayor (2026–32): Patrice Calméjane
- Area^{1}: 4.04 km^{2} (1.56 sq mi)
- Highest elevation: 107.44 m (352.5 ft)
- Lowest elevation: 54.05 m (177.3 ft)
- Population (2023): 29,795
  - Density: 7,370/km^{2} (19,100/sq mi)
- Time zone: UTC+01:00 (CET)
  - Summer (DST): UTC+02:00 (CEST)
- INSEE/Postal code: 93077 /93250
- ^{1} French Land Register data, which excludes lakes, ponds, glaciers > 1 km^{2} (0.386 sq mi or 247 acres) and river estuaries.

Villemomble (French pronunciation: [vilmɔ̃bl]) is a commune in the eastern suburbs of Paris, France. It is located 12.1 km (7.5 mi) from the centre of Paris.

== History ==
The Hôtel de Ville was completed in 1985.

== Heraldry ==
Arms of Villemomble	The arms of Villemomble are blazoned : Per pale argent and gules semy of castles Or, a lion gules surmounted by an escarbuncle fleury Or.
motto: villa non una sed mille (not one house but a thousand)

== Transport ==
Villemomble is served by Le Raincy – Villemomble – Montfermeil station on Paris RER line E.

== Demography ==
Historical population

Year	Pop.	±% p.a.
1793	417	—
1821	516	+0.76%
1846	670	+1.05%
1856	764	+1.32%
1861	860	+2.40%
1866	983	+2.71%
1872	1,180	+3.09%
1876	1,332	+3.08%
1881	2,033	+8.82%
1886	3,141	+9.09%
1891	3,725	+3.47%
1896	4,901	+5.64%
1901	6,104	+4.49%
1906	8,191	+6.06%
1911	8,959	+1.81%
1921	10,872	+1.95%

Year	Pop.	±% p.a.
1926	13,650	+4.66%
1931	17,199	+4.73%
1936	18,523	+1.49%
1946	18,641	+0.06%
1954	21,522	+1.81%
1962	24,540	+1.65%
1968	28,756	+2.68%
1975	28,727	−0.01%
1982	27,571	−0.59%
1990	26,863	−0.32%
1999	26,995	+0.05%
2007	28,283	+0.58%
2012	28,664	+0.27%
2017	29,964	+0.89%
2023	29,795	−0.09%

Source: EHESS and INSEE (1968-2023)

== Education ==
There are seven public preschools/nurseries (maternelles): Foch, Galliéni, François Mauriac, Montgolfier, Pasteur, Prévert, Saint-Exupéry. There are five public elementary schools: Foch I, Foch II, élémentaire d’application François Coppée Lamartine, Leclerc, and Saint-Exupéry.

There are two public junior high schools, Collège Jean de Beaumont and Collège Pasteur, and two public senior high schools/sixth-form colleges, Lycée Georges Clemenceau and Lycée professionnel Blaise Pascal.

Private schools include École maternelle Saint-Alexis, École élémentaire Sainte-Julienne, And the junior and senior high school of Institution Saint-Louis Blanche de Castille (collège Saint-Louis and lycée Blanche de Castille).

== Twin towns – sister cities ==
Villemomble is twinned with:

- Droylsden, England, United Kingdom
- Hardtberg (Bonn), Germany
- Portimão, Portugal

== See also ==
- Communes of the Seine-Saint-Denis department
