= List of Ministry of Foreign Affairs of Russia overseas schools =

The Russian Ministry of Foreign Affairs operates a network of overseas schools for children of Russian diplomats.

== Africa ==
| Country | Name | Notes |
|---|---|---|
| Algeria | Russian Embassy School in Algiers | |
| Angola | Russian Embassy School in Luanda | |
| Egypt | Russian Embassy School in Cairo | |
| Ethiopia | Russian Embassy School in Addis Ababa | |
| Guinea | Russian Embassy School in Conakry | |
| Libya | Russian Embassy School in Tripoli | |
| Madagascar | Russian Embassy School in Antananarivo | |
| Mali | Russian Embassy School in Bamako | |
| Morocco | Russian Embassy School in Rabat | |
| Nigeria | Russian Consulate School in Lagos | |
| South Africa | Russian Embassy School in Pretoria | |
| Tanzania | Russian Embassy School in Dar es Salaam | |
| Tunisia | Russian Embassy School in Tunis | |
| Zambia | Russian Embassy School in Lusaka | |

== North America ==
| Country | Name | Notes |
|---|---|---|
| United States | Russian Embassy School in Washington, D.C. | |
| United States | Russian Mission School in New York | |
| Cuba | Russian Embassy School in Havana | |
| Mexico | Russian Embassy School in Mexico City | |
| Nicaragua | Russian Embassy School in Managua | |

== South America ==
| Country | Name | Notes |
|---|---|---|
| Argentina | Russian Embassy School in Buenos Aires | |
| Brazil | Russian Embassy School in Brasília | |
| Chile | Russian Embassy School in Santiago | |
| Colombia | Russian Embassy School in Bogota | |
| Peru | Russian Embassy School in Lima | |

== Asia ==
| Country | Name | Notes |
|---|---|---|
| Bangladesh | Russian Embassy School in Dhaka | |
| China | Russian Embassy School in Beijing | |
| China | Russian Consulate School in Shanghai | Primary school only, located on the grounds of the Consulate-General of Russia in Shanghai in Hongkou District |
| Cambodia | Russian Embassy School in Phnom Penh | |
| India | Russian Embassy School in Delhi | |
| India | Russian Consulate School in Chennai | Primary school, established in 1972 |
| India | Russian Consulate School in Mumbai | Primary school |
| Indonesia | Russian Embassy School in Jakarta | |
| Iran | Russian Embassy School in Tehran | |
| Israel | Russian Embassy School in Tel Aviv | |
| Jordan | Russian Embassy School in Amman | |
| Japan | Russian Embassy School in Tokyo | |
| South Korea | Russian Embassy School in Seoul | |
| North Korea | Russian Embassy School in Pyongyang | |
| Kuwait | Russian Embassy School in Kuwait | |
| Laos | Russian Embassy School in Vientiane | |
| Malaysia | Russian Embassy School in Kuala Lumpur | |
| Mongolia | Russian Embassy School in Ulaanbaatar | |
| Myanmar | Russian Embassy School in Yangon | |
| Nepal | Russian Embassy School in Kathmandu | |
| Pakistan | Russian Embassy School in Islamabad | |
| Pakistan | Russian Consulate School in Karachi | |
| Sri Lanka | Russian Embassy School in Colombo | |
| Syria | Russian Embassy School in Damascus | |
| Thailand | Russian Embassy School in Bangkok | |
| Vietnam | Russian Embassy School in Hanoi | |
| Vietnam | Russian Consulate School in Ho Chi Minh City | |
| Yemen | Russian Embassy School in Sana'a | |

== Europe ==
| Country | Name | Notes |
|---|---|---|
| Austria | Russian Embassy School in Vienna | |
| Belgium | Russian Embassy School in Brussels | |
| Bulgaria | Russian Embassy School in Sofia | |
| Cyprus | Russian Embassy School in Nicosia | |
| Czech Republic | Russian Embassy School in Prague | |
| Denmark | Russian Embassy School in Copenhagen | |
| Finland | Russian Embassy School in Helsinki | |
| France | Russian Embassy School in Paris | |
| France | Russian Mission School in Strasbourg | |
| Germany | Russian Embassy School in Berlin | |
| Germany | Russian Consulate School in Bonn | |
| Greece | Russian Embassy School in Athens | |
| Hungary | Russian Embassy School in Budapest | |
| Italy | Russian Embassy School in Rome | |
| Malta | Russian Embassy School in Valletta | |
| Norway | Russian Embassy School in Oslo | |
| Poland | Russian Embassy School in Warsaw | Seized by Polish authorities in April 2023. |
| Portugal | Russian Embassy School in Lisbon | |
| Romania | Russian Embassy School in Bucharest | |
| Serbia | Russian Embassy School in Belgrade | |
| Slovakia | Russian Embassy School in Bratislava | |
| Slovenia | Russian Embassy School in Ljubljana | |
| Spain | Russian Embassy School in Madrid | |
| Sweden | Russian Embassy School in Stockholm | |
| Switzerland | Russian Mission School in Geneva | Serving families in Geneva and Bern. |
| Turkey | Russian Embassy School in Ankara | |
| Turkey | Russian Consulate School in Istanbul | |
| United Kingdom | Russian Embassy School in London | |

== Oceania ==
| Country | Name | Notes |
|---|---|---|
| Australia | Russian Embassy School in Canberra | Located on the grounds of the Embassy of Russia in Canberra in Griffith, Australian Capital Territory - Established in 2001, it is a primary school only and it also admits international students on a tuition basis |
