= French School in Tashkent =

French international school in Tashkent, Uzbekistan

Coordinates: 41°20′3.6″N 69°19′45.3″E

French School in Tashkent Russian: Французская школа в Ташкенте Uzbek: Toshkentdagi Fransuz maktabi

Information
- Established: 1997
- Grades: Preschool - Grade 12
- Language: French
- Website: https://www.ecole-francaise-tachkent.com/en/

French School in Tashkent (French: École Française de Tachkent, Russian: Французская школа в Ташкенте, Uzbek: Toshkentdagi Fransuz maktabi) is a French international school in Mirzo-Ulugbek, Tashkent, Uzbekistan, serving preschool through grade 12. French parents opened the school in 1997. The AEFE accredited the primary school in 2001.

Students taking the Diplôme National du Brevet examination do so in Tashkent. Students taking the baccalauréat travel to the Lycée Français Alexandre Dumas de Moscou in Moscow for their exams.
