= Franco-Russian War =

Franco-Russian War may refer to several wars between France and Russia:

- War of the Polish Succession (1733–1735)
- War of the Austrian Succession (1748)
- French Revolutionary and Napoleonic wars:
  - War of the Second Coalition (1798–1802)
  - War of the Third Coalition (1805)
  - War of the Fourth Coalition (1806–1807)
  - Napoleon's invasion of Russia (1812)
  - War of the Sixth Coalition (1813–1814)
- Crimean War (1854–1856)
- Allied intervention in the Russian Civil War (1918–1920)

== See also ==
- Franco-Prussian War
- Franco-Russian Alliance
- France–Russia relations
