= Russian Embassy School in Paris =

Russian international school in Paris, France

- French: Établissement public d’enseignement général, l’école secondaire auprès de l’Ambassade de la Fédération de Russie en France; Russian: специализированное структурное подразделение — средняя общеобразовательная школа с углублённым изучением иностранного языка при Посольстве России во Франции
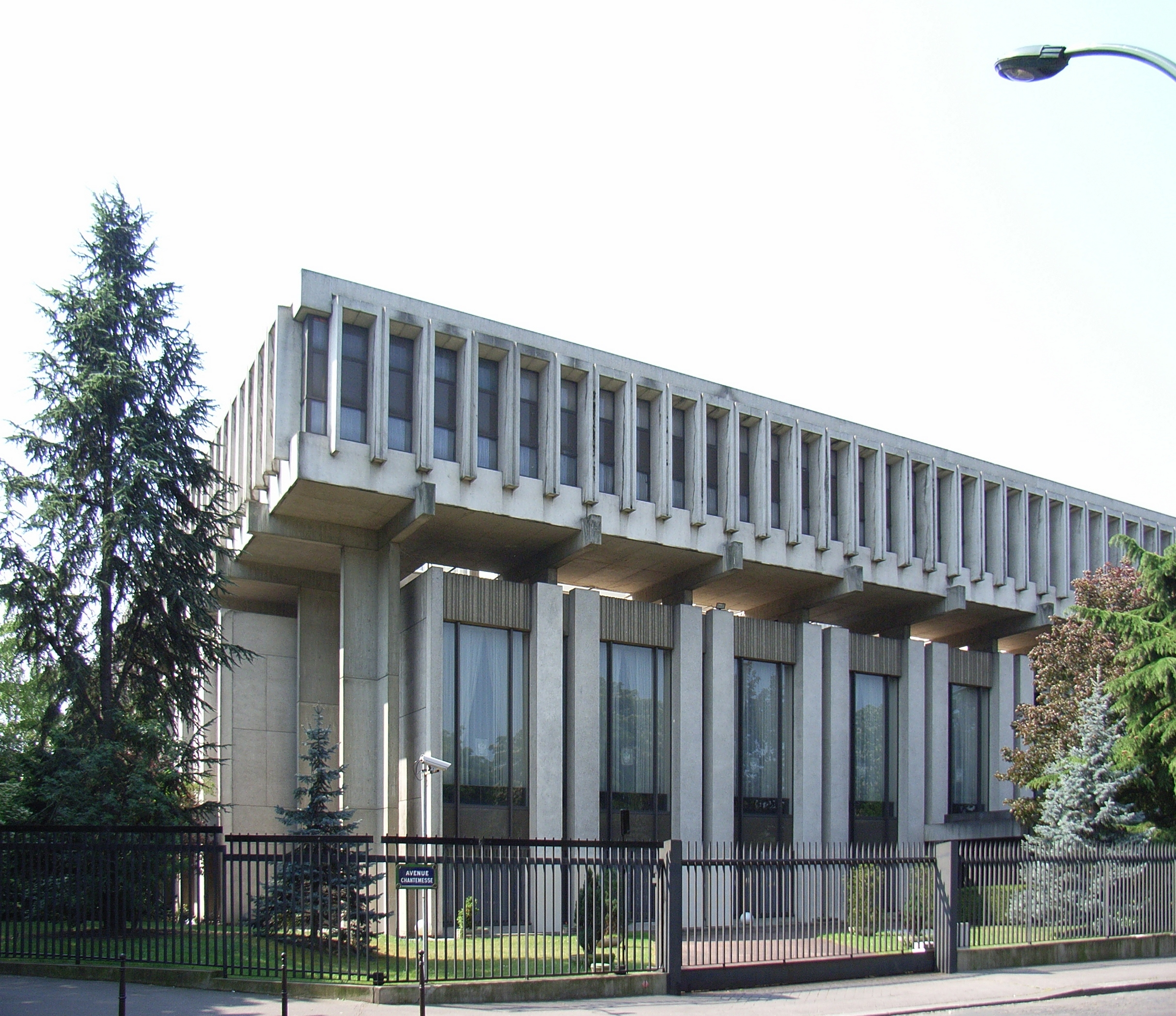
- The school is housed inside the Russian Embassy in Paris

Information
- Established: 1954; 72 years ago
- Grades: 1-11

Russian Embassy School in Paris (French: Établissement public d’enseignement général, l’école secondaire auprès de l’Ambassade de la Fédération de Russie en France; Russian: специализированное структурное подразделение — средняя общеобразовательная школа с углублённым изучением иностранного языка при Посольстве России во Франции) is a Russian international school in Paris, France, serving grades 1 through 11.

It is in the 16th arrondissement, on the grounds of the Russian Embassy in Paris.

It was established by the Soviet Union Ministry of Foreign Affairs, with classes starting in September 1954.

== See also ==
- France–Russia relations
- French schools in Russia:
  - Lycée français Alexandre Dumas de Moscou
  - École française André-Malraux in Saint Petersburg
  - École française - Mlf - PSA in Kaluga
