= Russian Orthodox Cathedral, Nice =

Cathedral located in Alpes-Maritimes, in France

Cathedral of Saint Nicholas Cathédrale Saint-Nicolas
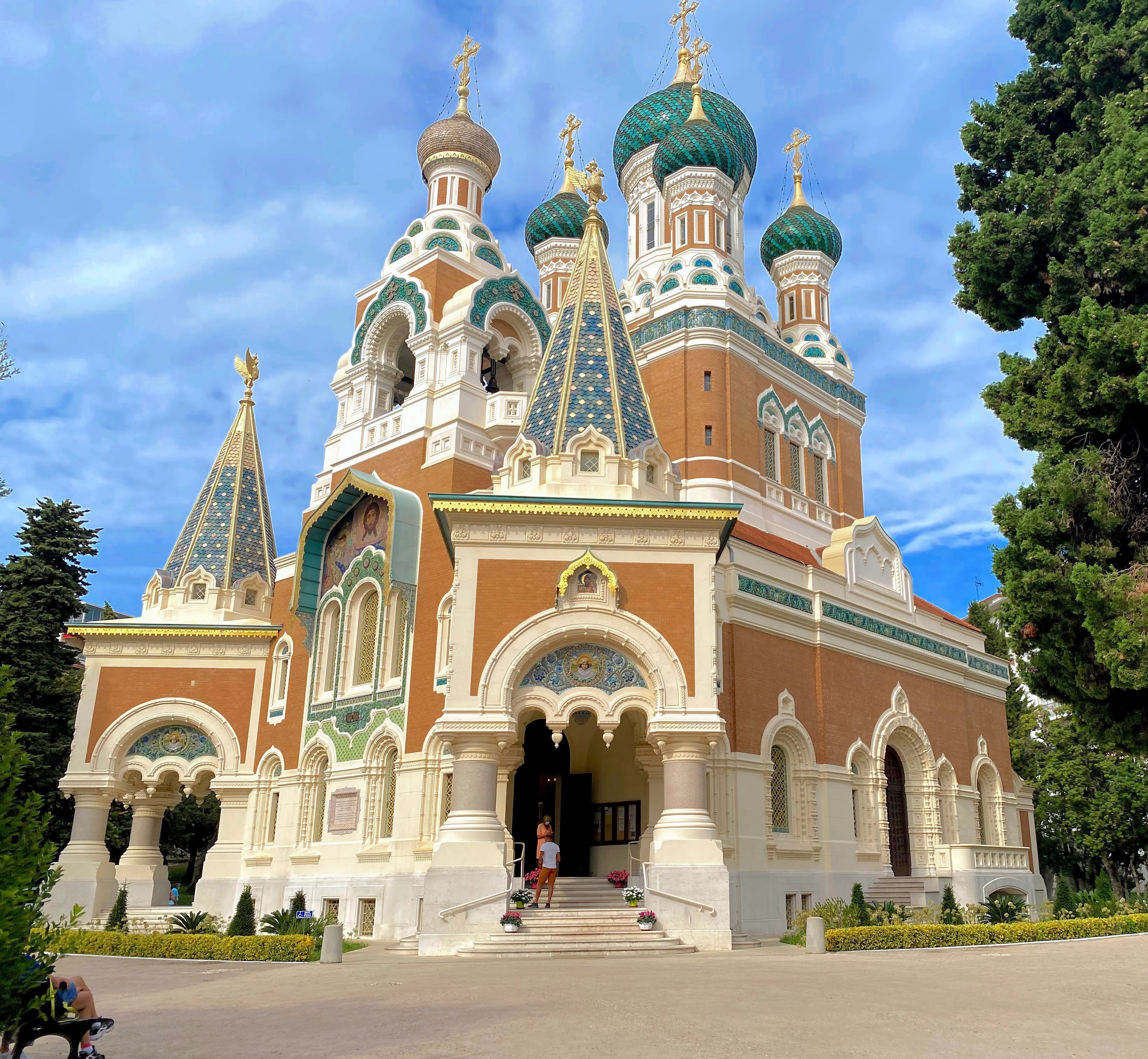
- St. Nicholas' Russian Orthodox Cathedral

Religion
- Affiliation: Russian Orthodox
- District: Russian Orthodox Church/Korsun diocese
- Ecclesiastical or organizational status: Cathedral

Location
- Location: Nice, France
- Interactive map of Cathedral of Saint Nicholas; Cathédrale Saint-Nicolas
- Coordinates: 43°42′14″N 7°15′14″E

Architecture
- Type: Church
- Groundbreaking: 1903
- Completed: 1912

The St Nicholas Orthodox Cathedral, Nice (French: Cathédrale Orthodoxe Saint-Nicolas de Nice, Russian: Николаевский собор, Ницца) is an Eastern Orthodox cathedral located in the French city of Nice. Property of the Russian Federation, it is recognized as a national monument of France, and it currently belongs to the jurisdiction of the Moscow Patriarchate. It is the largest Eastern Orthodox cathedral in Western Europe.

The cathedral was opened in 1912, with the assistance of Russia's Tsar Nicholas II. From 1931 until 15 December 2011 (after a longstanding legal dispute over ownership was resolved), the parish that occupied the cathedral was part of the Paris-based Patriarchal Exarchate for Orthodox Parishes of Russian Tradition in Western Europe under the jurisdiction of the Church of Constantinople. After 2011, following a final ruling by France's highest court, the Court of Cassation, the cathedral was declared to be property of the Russian state, and the congregation came under the jurisdiction of the Korsun diocese of the Russian Orthodox Church.

== History ==
Beginning in the mid-19th century, Russian nobility visited Nice and the French Riviera, following the fashion established decades earlier by the English upper class and nobility. In 1864, immediately after the railway reached Nice, Tsar Alexander II visited by train and was attracted by the pleasant climate. Thus began an association between Russians and the French Riviera that continues to this day.

The cathedral, consecrated in December 1912 in memory of Nicholas Alexandrovich, Tsarevich of Russia, who died in Nice, was meant to serve the large Russian community that had settled in Nice by the end of the 19th century, as well as devout visitors from the imperial court. Tsar Nicholas II funded the construction work.

After 1917, Communist persecution of religion in Russia led some Russian Orthodox dioceses abroad to form jurisdictions not affiliated with Moscow. One of these, the Paris-based exarchate, later assumed control of the Nice Cathedral.

On 20 January 2010, a French court (the Tribunal of First Instance at Nice) ruled that the title to the cathedral should be held by the Russian state.

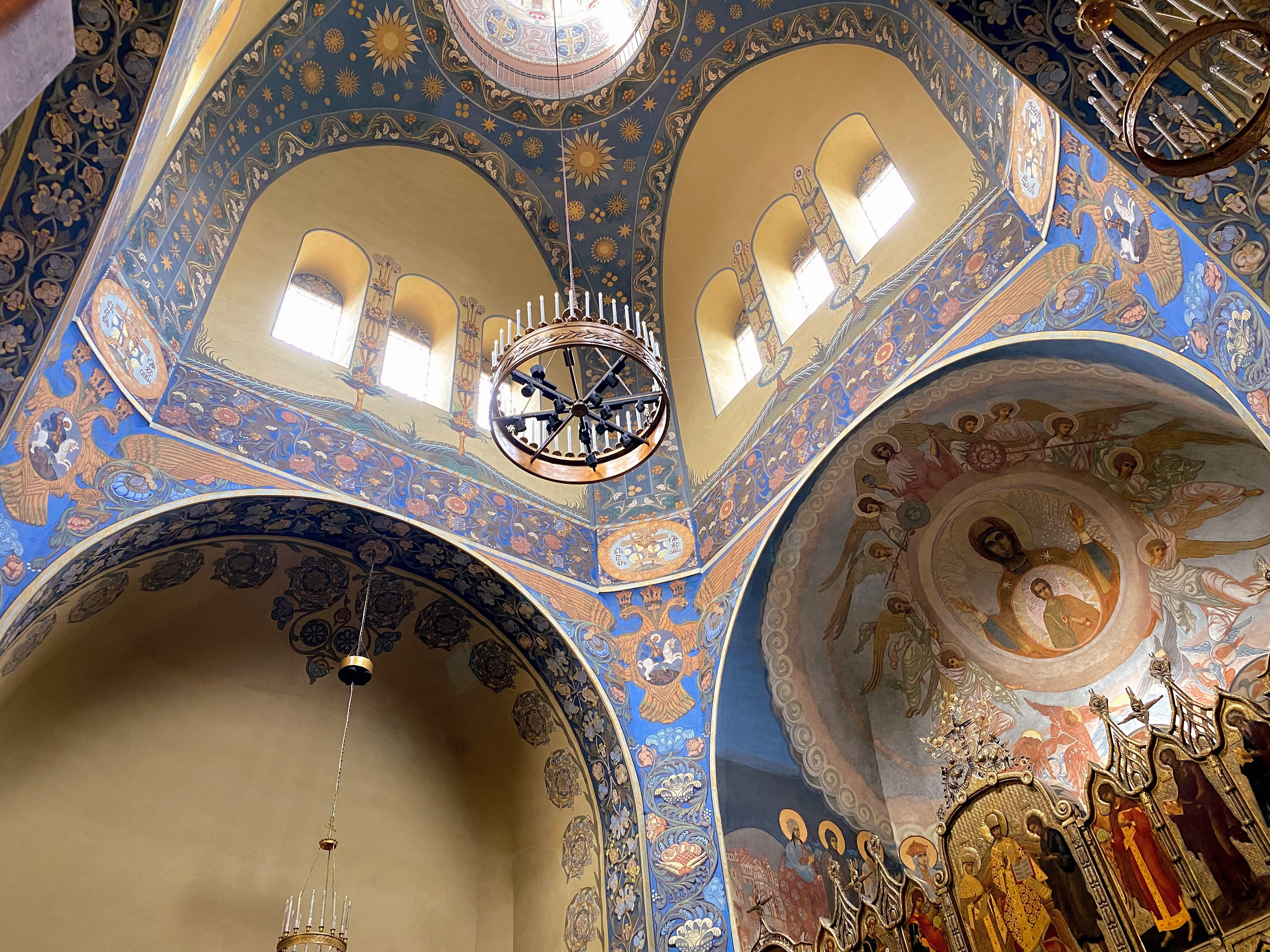
Inside the cathedral

== Legal dispute ==
From 2005 till December 2011, there was a protracted ownership and church jurisdictional dispute over the church building as well as control over the parish, between the existing administration of the Exarchate (for legal purposes represented by the "association culturelle") on the one hand and the RF government on the other. The dispute partly stemmed from a conflict between old Russian nobility who had long since settled in Nice and newly arrived post-Soviet Russians. The Russian state, which in 2010 was recognised by the French court as the legal owner, decided in 2011 to turn the church building over to the Moscow Patriarchate.

On 10 April 2013, the Cour de Cassation, the highest civil court in France, refused to quash the decision of the Court of Appeal, with the result that the building itself and the parcel of land on which it stands were confirmed as the property of the Russian Federation.
