= Russians in France =

Total population
- 53,000 to 500,000

Regions with significant populations
- Paris, Île-de-France, Nice, Marseille, Bordeaux, Lyon, Corsica

Languages
- French, Russian, Yiddish, Hebrew

Religion
- Predominantly † Eastern Orthodox Christianity (Russian Orthodox Church); Minorities of Old Believers, Russian Greek Catholic Church, and Jews

Russians are a small diaspora in France but one of the most important groups in the Russian diaspora.

== History ==
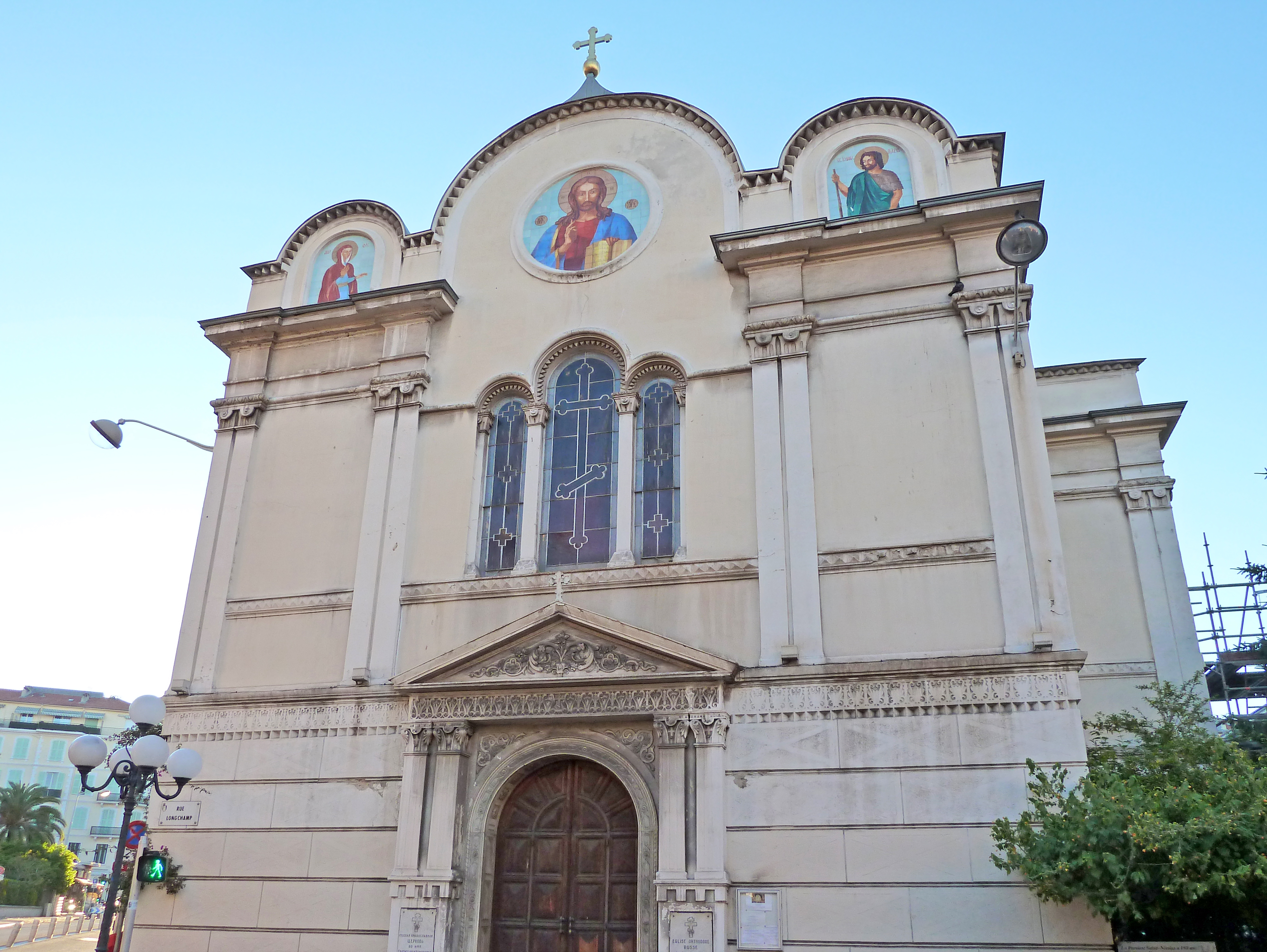
The Église Saint-Nicolas-et-Sainte-Alexandra

The French Riviera was a favorite spot, where the European aristocracy had launched the fashion of the rainy season. Some also came there to treat tuberculosis which was then rampant. The Empress Alexandra Feodorovna, wife of the late Nicolas I, visited annually after she became a widow, and raised money for an Orthodox church to be built on the Rue Longchamp.

The Église Saint-Nicolas-et-Sainte-Alexandra was consecrated on December 31, 1859 in the city of Nice, which at that time had more than 45 000 inhabitants and was part with its County of the Kingdom of Sardinia, belonging to the House of Savoy, before being annexed to the French Empire by plebiscite a few months later in April 1860. In December 1912, half a century later, the Russian Orthodox Cathedral would be consecrated in memory of Nicholas Alexandrovich, Tsarevich of Russia, who died in Nice. The building itself and the parcel of land on which it stands remain the property of the Russian state to this day.

=== Russian Civil War ===
Of approximately 1.5 million exiles during the Russian Civil War, about 400,000 took up residence in France. Political refugees, White émigrés gathered around charities like the Zemgor Committee and the company of the Russian Red Cross, the St. Sergius Orthodox Theological Institute (founded in 1924) and the Action chrétienne des étudiants russes (ACER ) (1926), which provided to their community an associative link, political and religious, as well as material aid.

As a symbol of this massive immigration, 10,000 Russians are buried at Sainte-Geneviève-des-Bois Russian Cemetery.

=== Exodus of White Russians in Corsica ===
The ship "Rion", carrying some 3,422 refugees (Russians, Ukrainians and Cossacks) from Constantinople to Brazil had stopped in Ajaccio, on May 15, 1921 at 2 am. Ajaccio, an island city of 20,000 inhabitants, saw in one day its population increase by 20%. On May 25, 10 days after the arrival of the ship, some 600 refugees were finally allowed to land and settle at the Livrelli barracks, located in the center of Ajaccio.

== Notable people ==
- Igor and Grichka Bogdanoff
- Olga Khokhlova
- Nicholas Alexandrovich
- Alexandre Alekhine
- Mary Marquet
- Arthur Adamov
- Élie Metchnikoff
- Lili Boulanger (half; mother was Russian)
- Nadia Boulanger (half; mother was Russian)
- Hélène Carrère d'Encausse

== See also ==
- Russian Expeditionary Force in France
- Russian diaspora
- France–Russia relations
