= Igumnov House =

Historic house in Moscow, Russia

Coordinates: 55°43′58″N 37°36′47″E

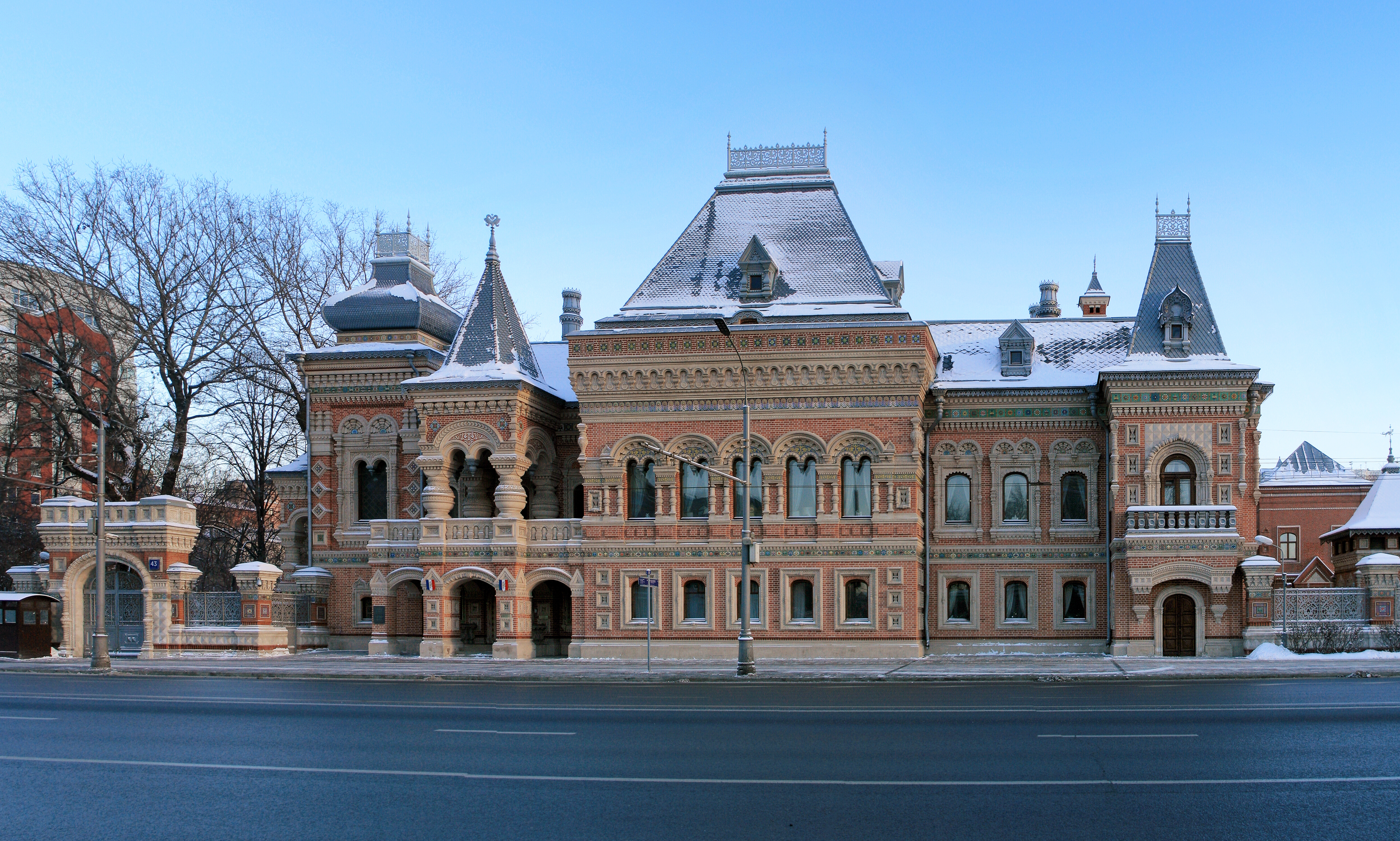
French Ambassador's official residence, Moscow, January 2017

Igumnov House (Russian: «Дом Игумнова») is a historic house in Moscow, used as the residence of the French Ambassador to Russia. The house is located at 43 Bolshaya Yakimanka Street (Russian: ул. Большая Якиманка, 43) in the Yakimanka District of Moscow.

== The building ==
It is the oldest building occupied by the French embassy, facing Yakimanka Street (No. 43) - Igumnov House - was built in 1883 – 1893 to the design by Nikolay Pozdeyev (1855–1893), and cost the architect his life. Igumnov family acquired the lot in 1851; in 1880 Nikolay Igumnov hired Nikolay Pozdeyev to rebuild the old two-story empire style mansion into a larger residence. Pozdeyev, a graduate of Imperial Academy of Arts, already had five years of practice as the town architect of Yaroslavl, where Igumnov had substantial investments in textile mills. Halfway through the project, in 1888, architect and the client agreed to discard the existing structure altogether and redesign the building from scratch; its dimensions, as built, increased to 45×33 meters. After 13 years of slow progress the building attracted public attention and became a target of numerous art critics, detesting its pseudo-Russian luxury; whether for this reason or due to sheer greed, Igumnov refused to compensate cost overruns to Pozdeyev; the ruined architect committed suicide in October 1893.

After the October Revolution the nationalised building was taken over by a communal club, then by medical institutions. These included the Institute of Blood Transfusion established by Alexander Bogdanov in 1926. He lived there with his wife, Natalia Bogdanovna. Following his death, Natalia had Bogdanov's son move into her flat, the two of them remaining there until 1937.

The Embassy of France has occupied it continuously since 1938. A larger, modernist Embassy structure (No. 45) was built on an adjacent block in 1979; since that year, Igumnov House became an official residence of the ambassador. In August 2007 the management of GlavUpDK, the state organization in charge of embassy buildings, announced a forthcoming restoration of the building, estimated to cost 10 million US dollars.

== See also ==
- France–Russia relations
- Diplomatic missions in Russia
