= Russian Consulate School in Strasbourg =

School in Strasbourg, France

- Russian: Специализированное структурное образовательное подразделение - начальная общеобразовательная школа при Генеральном консульстве России в Страсбурге, Франция

Information
- School type: International school
- Established: 1996; 30 years ago
- Language: Russian

Russian Consulate School in Strasbourg (Russian: Специализированное структурное образовательное подразделение - начальная общеобразовательная школа при Генеральном консульстве России в Страсбурге, Франция, romanized: Spetsializirovannoye strukturnoye obrazovatel'noye podrazdeleniye - nachal'naya obshcheobrazovatel'naya shkola pri General'nom konsul'stve Rossii v Strasburge, Frantsiya) is a Russian international school in Strasbourg, France, serving primary and secondary levels. It was established in 1996.

== See also ==
- France–Russia relations
- French schools in Russia:
  - Lycée français Alexandre Dumas de Moscou
