= Lycée français Alexandre Dumas de Moscou =

- Французский лицей в Москве
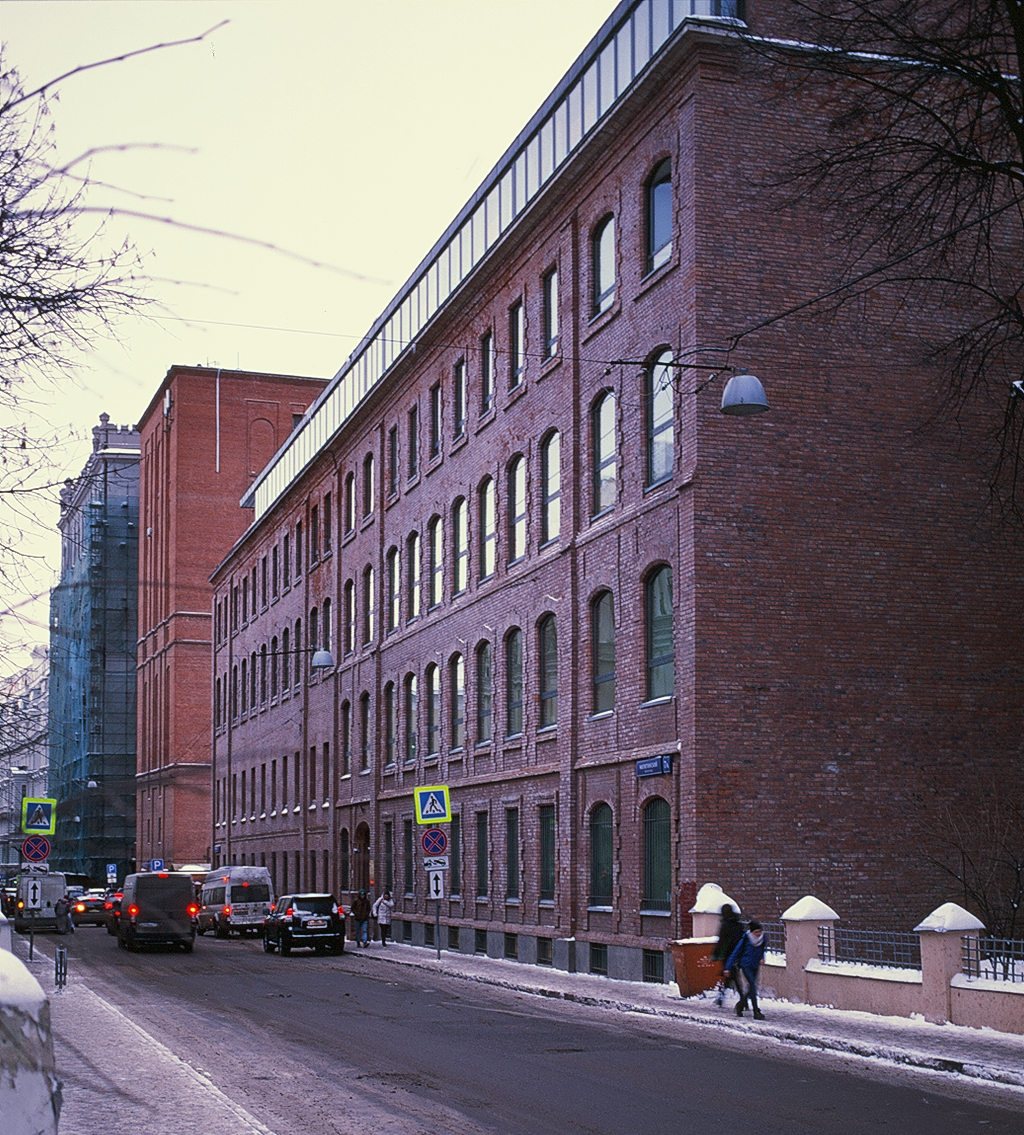

Location
- 7A Milioutinsky per., 101000 MOSCOU; 101000 МОСКВА, Милютинский пер. д. 7А; Russia; 55.763°N 37.632°E

Information
- Type: French international school
- Website: lfmoscou.com

The Lycée Français Alexandre Dumas de Moscou (Russian: Французский лицей в Москве) is the French international school in Krasnoselsky District, Central Administrative Okrug, Moscow, Russia.

It is directly operated by the Agency for French Education Abroad (AEFE), an agency of the French government. It serves years cm2 to Terminale.

== See also ==
- France–Russia relations
- Russian schools in France:
  - Russian Embassy School in Paris
  - Russian Consulate School in Strasbourg
