= France–Russia relations =

- France: Russia

Diplomatic mission
- Embassy of France, Moscow: Embassy of Russia, Paris

Envoy
- Ambassador Nicolas de Rivière: Ambassador Extraordinary and Plenipotentiary Aleksey Meshkov

France–Russia relations, also known as Franco-Russian relations or Russo-French relations, are the bilateral relations between the French Republic and the Russian Federation. France has an embassy in Moscow, whereas Russia has an embassy in Paris. Relations have historically been complicated, and have been more tense in recent years.

== History ==
In the 18th century, Russia imported French intellectuals, most of whom were negative about the little-known land. During the Napoleonic era (1799–1815), both nations wanted to dominate Central and Eastern Europe. Napoleon launched a massive invasion of Russia in 1812, but its failure led to his defeat and Russian dominance in Eastern Europe. Russia also wanted to dominate the Ottoman Empire, but France and Britain fought and won the Crimean War (1854–1856) to prevent that.

In the 1890s France was diplomatically isolated and built an alliance with Russia. Together with Britain, they went to war with Germany between 1914 and 1918. After gaining control in the Russian Revolution of 1917, the Bolsheviks signed the Treaty of Brest-Litovsk with the Central Powers in 1918. In the 1930s, France could not forge an alliance against a resurgent Nazi Germany. The Soviet Union and the United States were the remaining superpowers after 1945, but they faced off in a long Cold War (1947–1989). France supported the United States in the NATO alliance against Communist expansion. Since 1989 relations have been proper but not warm, with several issues marring relations such as the War in Donbas (which evolved into the 2022 Russian invasion of Ukraine) and Russia's increasing involvement in West Africa.

Due to the fact that the Russian centralised state, formed in the 15th-16th centuries, was almost constantly in a state of diplomatic and military confrontation with the Polish–Lithuanian Commonwealth, the Catholic rulers of France for a long time avoided establishing direct diplomatic contacts with Moscow. Real interest in Russia appeared in France only after the 1607 publication of the work of Huguenot mercenary Jacques Margeret, "The State of the Russian State and the Grand Duchy of Moscow", information from which was used in the "History of his time" (1620) by the famous historian Jacques Auguste de Thou (1553–1617).

In 1615, the embassy of Ivan Kondyrev arrived at the court of Louis XIII, which ended in failure, but laid the foundation for diplomatic relations between Russia and France.

In the summer of 1668, a Russian embassy travelled from Spain to Paris. Headed by the steward Pyotr Potemkin, who had an audience with Louis XIV and Jean-Baptiste Colbert, the embassy discussed the establishment of mutually beneficial trade relations between the two countries.

The first diplomatic representation of Russia in France appeared in 1702 by decree of Peter I, who was interested in an alliance with Louis XIV due to the rapprochement between England and Sweden. A visit to France by Peter I himself in 1717 served as the starting point for the establishment of permanent diplomatic relations between the two countries, interrupted only by the French Revolution.

Concerned about the dominance of the Germans at the court of Empress Anna Ioannovna (1730–1740), French diplomacy actively promoted the palace coup of 1741 and the enthronement of Elizabeth of Russia, who from her youth sympathised with France and King Louis XV, whom she had unsuccessfully tried to marry. An active role was played by the Marquis de la Chétardie, who served as diplomatic envoy to the Russian court from 1739 to 1744. However, after the efforts of Chancellor Alexey Bestuzhev-Ryumin, de la Chétardie fell into disgrace and in 1748, the influence of the pro-French party weakened noticeably.

=== 18th century ===
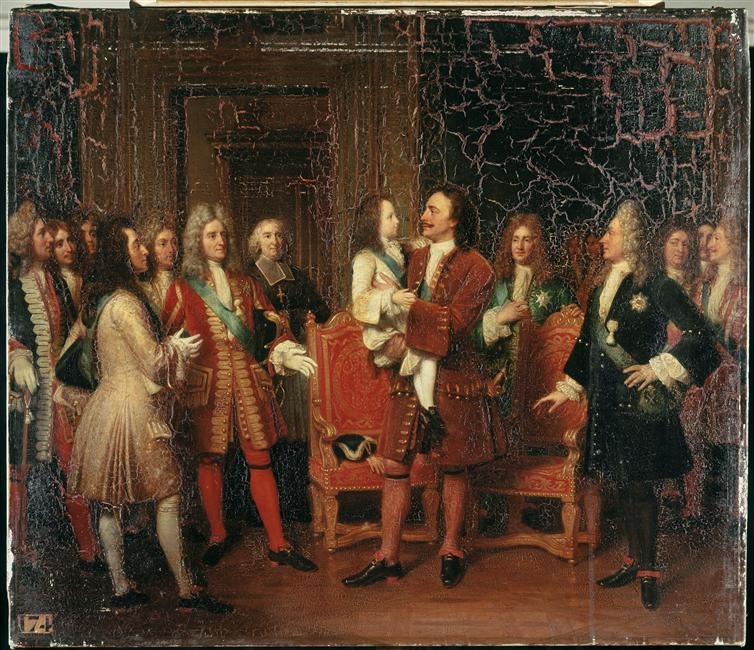
Russian Tsar Peter the Great visits the young King Louis XV in 1717

Franco-Russian diplomatic ties began in 1702, when France Jean Casimir Baluze as ambassador and the Tsar sent Peter Postnikov to Paris. France was the dominant nation in Western Europe and Russia in Eastern Europe, so their interests seldom overlapped. When involved in the same war, their troops rarely fought together as allies or directly against each other as enemies on the same battlefields. There was some tension when the Russians took an interest in Malta, in the center of French control of the Mediterranean, and Paris made sure the influence was limited. Increasingly as each power expanded each played a growing role in the European balance of power. France was generally allied with Sweden, Poland–Lithuania, and the Ottoman Empire, in explicit opposition to the Austrian Habsburgs but implicitly also against Russia. There was no direct war between the two. However they fought on opposite sides in the 1733–1738 War of the Polish Succession and in the 1740–1748 War of the Austrian Succession; they were allies against Prussia and Great Britain during the Seven Years' War of 1756 to 1763.

There was little economic trade but more in the way of intellectual exchange, starting with the visit of Peter the Great to Paris in 1717. He and Empresses Elizabeth and Catherine all sponsored French intellectuals to visit and teach in Russia. Thus French artists dominated the Russian Academy of Fine Arts after 1758. In the mid 18th century Voltaire gave French Enlightenment intellectuals a positive image, portraying Russia as an opportunity society, in which an all-powerful leaders such as Peter the Great could create a rational and enlightened society by decree. On the other hand, equally influential French Enlightenment writers, especially Denis Diderot, portrayed Russia in dark colours, emphasising the lack of an Enlightenment tradition or a middle class, and a propensity toward harsh dictatorship.

=== 19th century ===
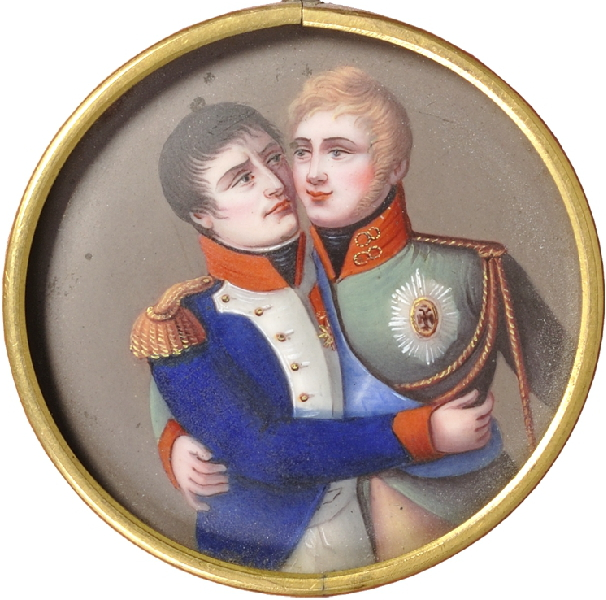
A French medallion shows Napoleon and Alexander embracing at Tilsit in 1807; Alexander was much taller and the mutual affection was minimal.

==== Napoleonic Wars ====
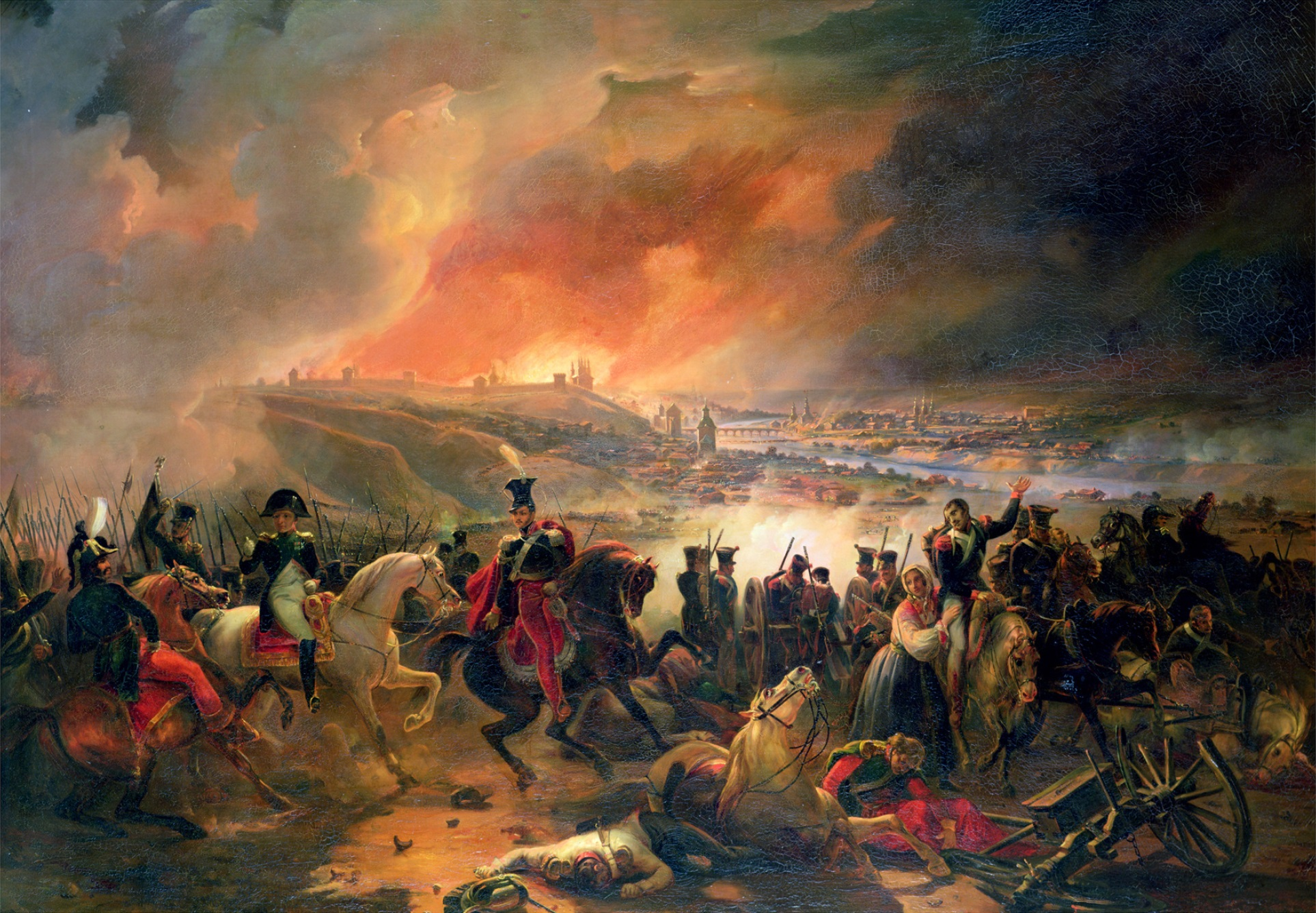
The Battle of Smolensk by Jean-Charles Langlois, 1839. Napoleon and Prince Poniatowski before the burning city of Smolensk during the French invasion of Russia, 1812

Russia and France were mostly enemies in the Napoleonic Wars. Russia fought against France in the War of the Second Coalition. Once Napoleon Bonaparte came to power in 1799, Russia remained hostile and fought in the Wars of the Third and Fourth Coalitions, which were victories for France and saw French power extend into Central Europe. After the defeat of the Imperial Russian Army in the Battle of Friedland, Napoleon and Tsar Alexander I met aboard a barge in the Nieman River to negotiate a separate peace in a ceremony modeled after negotiations of Roman Emperors. Although Napoleon and Alexander had cordial personal relations, the Treaties of Tilsit in 1807 led to an uneasy alliance. Both Napoleon and Alexander wanted to control eastern Europe. However Napoleon established a puppet Polish state — the Duchy of Warsaw — which annoyed Russia. Napoleon was bothered that Russia was trading with the United Kingdom. The goal was not to conquer or absorb Russia but to punish the Tsar and force him back into line. Napoleon amassed a huge army of 600,000 soldiers from France and its allies to invade Russia in 1812. Only a tenth survived the fighting and the extreme cold. It was a spectacular defeat for France and a turning point in the Napoleonic Wars, leading to a massive Sixth coalition alliance in which Russia played the leading role. Paris fell. Bonaparte abdicated and the Bourbon kings returned to power in 1814. Napoleon made a brief 100-day return in 1815 but was forced to surrender again.

==== Russia supports conservatism after 1814 ====
At the Vienna Congress of 1814–15, Russia played a major diplomatic role as a leader of the conservative, anti-revolutionary forces. This suited the Bourbon kings who again ruled France after the Restoration. Russia was a leader of the conservative Concert of Europe which sought to stifle revolution.

Russia and France both supported the successful Greek revolt against Ottoman rule, 1821–1831. In terms of minorities living under Ottoman rule, Russia saw itself as the protector of Orthodox Christianity while France saw itself as the protector of Catholicism. Russia gave financial support of the Eastern Orthodox Church in Syria and Palestine, while France aided Catholic mission work. Russia's impact was limited by distrust of Greek bishops who distrusted the Patriarch in Moscow.

Charles X and his ministers in the late 1820s sought to strengthen France's position in Europe by pursuing an alliance with Tasrist Russia, particularly under the influence of the Ultras government led by Prince de Polignac. The alliance stance was intended to counterbalance Great Britain (Hanover) and liberal forces in Europe, ensuring that France remained aligned with other reactionary powers. However, Russia was heavily preoccupied with the Polish insurrection, which prevented Russian aid any possibility of external military intervention to maintain Charles X's regime during the July Revolution.

Russia led the forces of conservatism that helped crush the Revolutions of 1848 across Eastern Europe. In France, however, the Revolution succeeded in bringing the liberal Louis-Napoleon Bonaparte to power. Soon thereafter Napoleon's ambitious nephew arranged to have himself crowned Emperor Napoleon III of the Second Empire. The intellectual mood in France feared Russian expansionism, military strength, and a premodern Asiatic (or "Tatar") perspective that hated the Enlightenment roots of Western European culture. The mood fostered public support for the Crimean War as Britain and France defeated Russia, 1854–1856.

==== France joins Crimean War against Russia, 1854–1856 ====
Napoleon III favoured a "policy of nationalities" (principe des nationalités) or support to national revolutions in multinational countries like Austria-Hungary and the Ottoman Empire, something fervently opposed by the Tsarist regime. France's challenges to Russia's influence led France to participate in the Crimean War, which saw British and French troops invade the Crimean peninsula and defeat Russia.

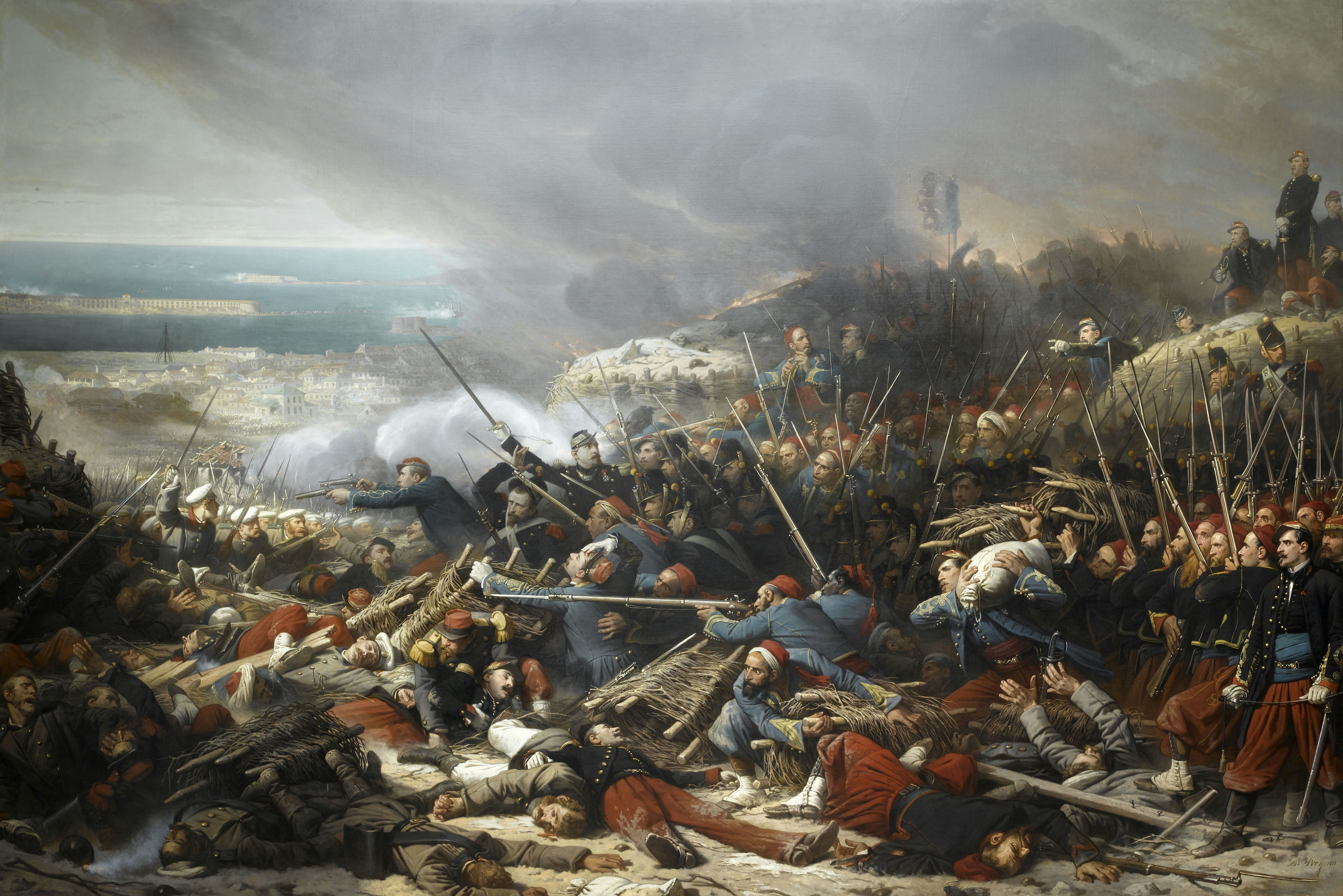
The Malakoff Gorge by Adolphe Yvon. The Battle of Malakoff during the Crimean War, 1855

==== Temporary entente 1859–1863 ====
Following the Crimean War, Napoleon III tried hard to reach a friendly entente with Russia, and succeeded in so doing with a secret treaty signed in March 1859. The treaty stated in article 1: "in case of war of Piedmont and France against Austria, the Emperor Alexander will, from the moment of the declaration of war, adopt a political and military position most clearly demonstrating his benevolent neutrality towards France." A. J. P. Taylor says the 1859 treaty "was a triumph for Napoleon; and indeed it alone made possible the liberation of Italy". However, when the January Uprising broke out in Congress Poland in 1863, France sent a series of notes to Russia demanding reforms and ended the 1859 entente. In Prussia, Otto von Bismarck took a friendly position toward Russia on Poland and other issues, and made sure that when war broke out between France and the German states in 1870, Russia was neutral, as was every other power.

==== Growth of ties 1871–1900 ====
Imperial Russia's foreign policy was hostile to republican France in the 19th century and very pro-German. The First and Second Three Emperor's Leagues of the 1870s and 1880s-which brought together Germany, Austria and Russia-had as its stated purpose the preservation of the monarchical order in Europe against the France of the Third Republic. After the defeat in the Franco-German war of 1870–71, French elites concluded that France could never hope to defeat Germany on its own, and the way to defeat the Reich would be with the help of another great power. Germany's Otto von Bismarck drew the same conclusion and worked hard to keep France diplomatically isolated.

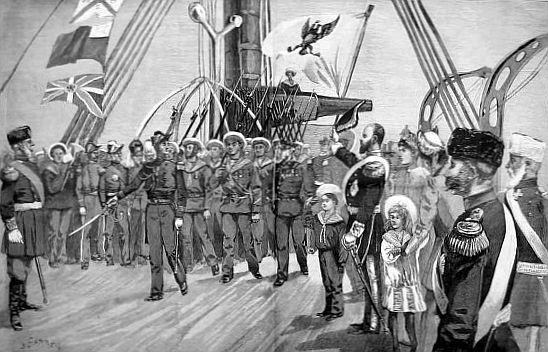
French Fleet in Kronstadt in 1892

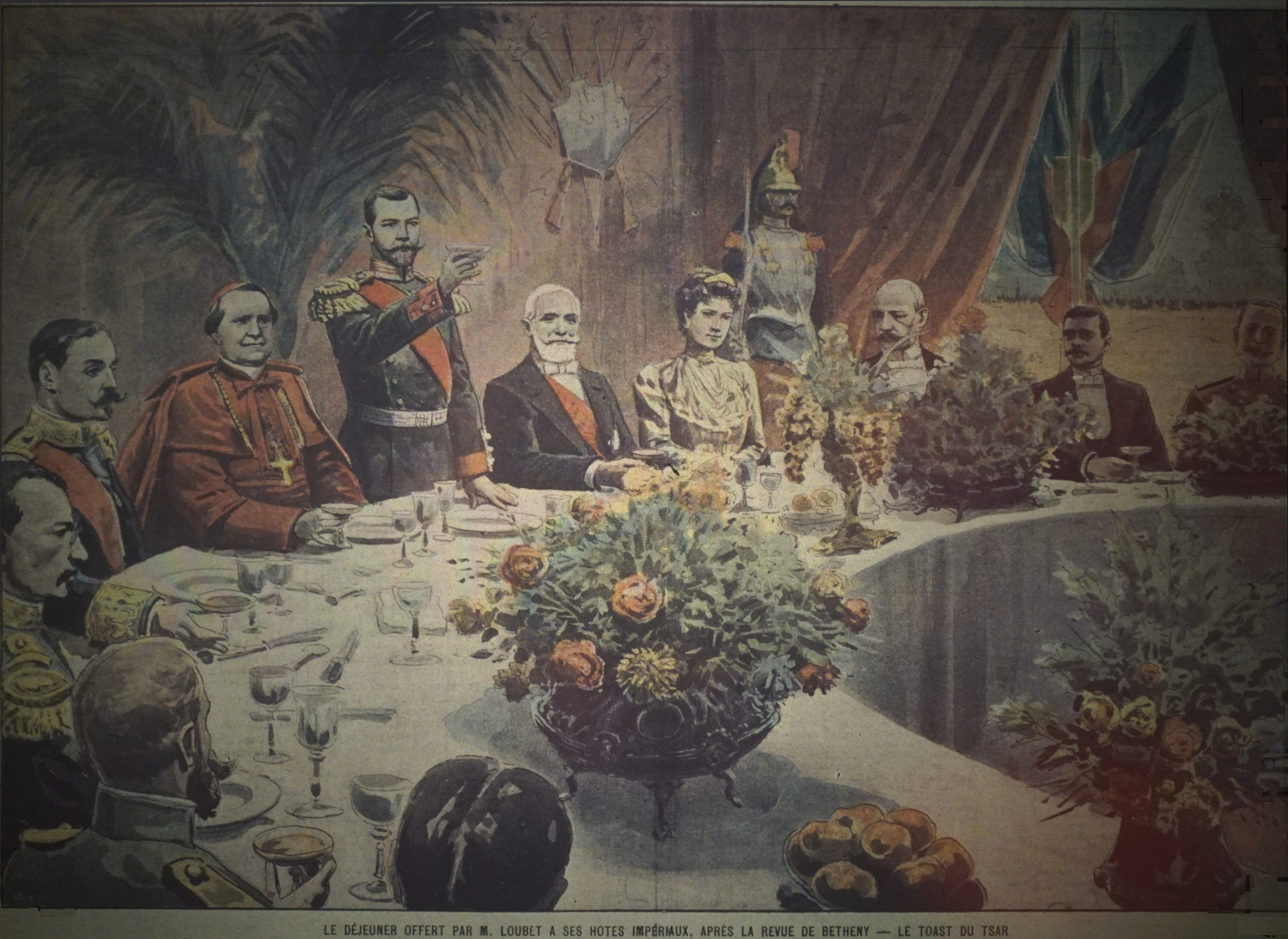
French President Émile Loubet and Nicholas II of Russia in France in 1901

Politically, France was deeply polarised between monarchists on one side and republicans on the other. Initially, the republicans opposed any Russian alliance, as the two had different positions on almost all international affairs at that time. At a time when French Republicans were rallying in the Dreyfus affair against anti-Semitism, Russia was the most notorious center of anti-Semitic outrages. On the other hand, France was increasingly frustrated by Bismarck's success in isolating it diplomatically. France had issues with Italy, which was allied with Germany and Austria-Hungary in the Triple Alliance. Paris made a few overtures to Berlin, but they were rebuffed, and after 1900 there was a threat of war between France and Germany over Germany's attempt to deny French expansion into Morocco. The United Kingdom was still pursuing its "splendid isolation" foreign policy and after a major agreement in 1890 with Germany, it seemed favourable toward Berlin. By 1892, Russia was the only opportunity for France to break out of its diplomatic isolation. Russia had been allied with Germany when Kaiser Wilhelm II dismissed Bismarck in 1890 and ended the Reinsurance Treaty with Russia in 1892. Russia was alone diplomatically and like France, it needed a military alliance to contain the threat of Germany's strong army and military aggressiveness. Pope Leo XIII, angered by German anti-Catholicism, worked diplomatically to bring Paris and St. Petersburg together. Russia desperately needed money for the completion of railways and ports. The Reich government refused to allow German banks to lend money to Russia, but French banks did so eagerly. For example, it funded the essential Trans-Siberian Railway. Rejected by Germany, Russia cautiously began a policy of rapprochement with France starting in 1891. The French for their part were very interested in the Russian offers of an alliance.

In August 1891, France and Russia signed a "consultative pact" where both nations agreed to consult each other if another power were to threaten the peace of Europe. Negotiations were increasingly successful, and in early 1894 France and Russia agreed to the Franco-Russian Alliance, a military pledge to join in war if Germany attacked either of them. The alliance was intended to deter Germany from going to war by presenting it with the threat of a two-front war; neither France or Russia could hope to defeat Germany on its own, but their combined power might do so. France had finally escaped its diplomatic isolation. The alliance was secret until 1897, when the French government realised that secrecy was defeating its deterrent value. After France was humiliated by Britain in the Fashoda Incident of 1898, the French wanted the alliance to become an anti-British alliance.

During the Transvaal War, The foreigner ministry Count N. V. Muraviev attempted to persuade Germany to join a coordinated propose Franco-Russian "Continental System" alliance. Although France and Russia hoped to pull Germany into a cohesive anti-British front, Germany was unwilling to fully commit. It preferred maintaining independent diplomatic autonomy and avoiding direct confrontation with Britain during the South African conflict.

=== 20th century ===
European military alliances prior to World War I Triple Entente Triple Alliance

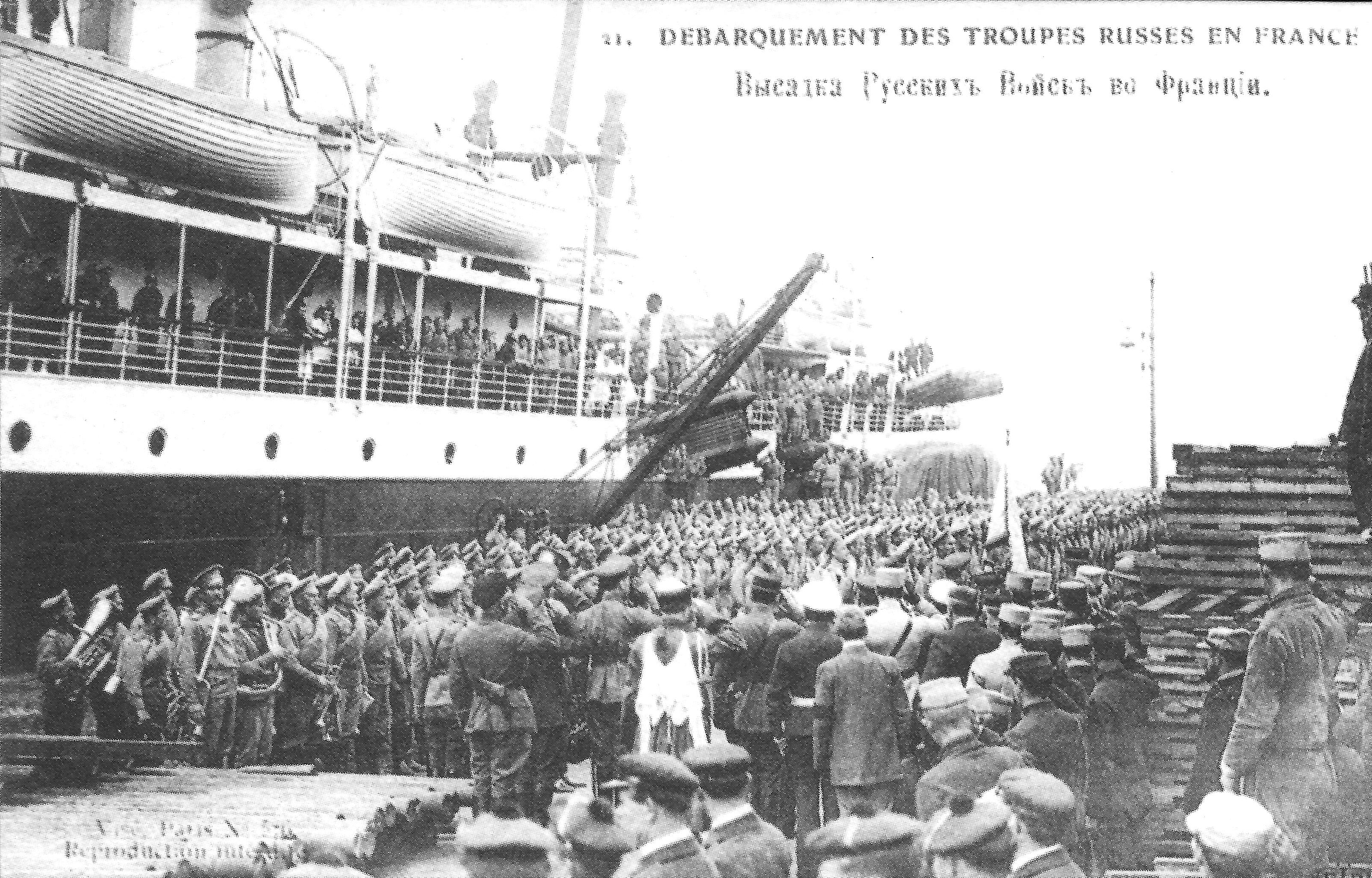
Russian troops arriving in Marseille on the steamship Himalaya, 1916

In 1902, Japan formed a military alliance with Britain. In response, Russia worked with France in order to renege on agreements to reduce troop strength in Manchuria. On 16 March 1902, a mutual pact was signed between France and Russia. During the Russo-Japanese War of 1904–1905, France remained neutral.

During the Bosnian crisis of 1908–1909, France declined to support Russia against Austria-Hungary and Germany. The lack of French support was the low point of Franco-Russian relations, and Nicholas II made no effort to hide his disgust at the lack of assistance from his closest ally. He seriously considered abrogating the alliance with France, and was only stopped by the lack of an alternative. Further linking the two nations were their common economic interests: Russia wished to industrialise, but lacked the necessary capital, while the French were more than prepared to lend the necessary money to finance Russia's industrialisation. By 1913, French investors had invested 12 billion francs into Russian assets, making the French the largest investors in the Russian Empire. The industrialisation of the Russian Empire was partially the result of a massive influx of French capital into the country.

When World War I began in 1914, the Central Powers were opposed by the Triple Entente, composed of Russia, France and Britain. In 1916, Russia's Brusilov offensive achieved its original goal of forcing Germany to halt its attack on Verdun and transfer considerable forces to the East.

==== Soviet Union ====
After the 1917 Bolshevik Revolution, Russia left the Entente and agreed to a separate peace with the Central Powers. In December 1917 France broke relations with Bolshevik Russia and supported the White Guard in the Russian Civil War. It also recognised Pyotr Wrangel, the military dictator of South Russia and the leader of the White Caucasus Army, as the legitimate head of state of Russia.

The rapid growth of power in Nazi Germany encouraged both Paris and Moscow to form a military alliance, and the Franco-Soviet Treaty of Mutual Assistance was signed in May 1935, though this was largely symbolic and emboldened Hitler to pursue more aggressive foreign policy in Europe. A firm believer in collective security, Stalin's foreign minister Maxim Litvinov worked very hard to form a closer relationship with France and Britain.

When Germany invaded the USSR in 1941, Charles de Gaulle emphasised that Free France supported the Soviet Union. In December 1944, de Gaulle went to Moscow, where the two nations signed a treaty of alliance and mutual assistance. The treaty was renounced in 1955 due to Cold War tensions.

Soviet General Secretary Mikhail Gorbachev made a visit to France in October 1985 in order to address strains in Franco-Soviet relations.

=== 1991–2015 ===
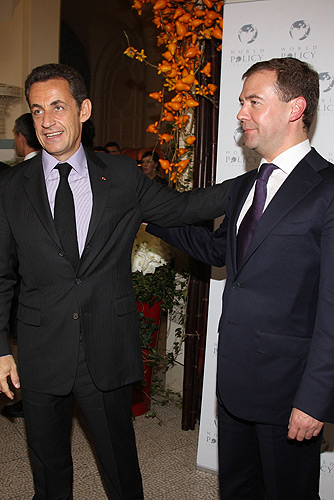
Russian President Dmitry Medvedev (right) and French President Nicolas Sarkozy in 2008

The USSR disintegrated in 1991 and Communism collapsed in France and across Europe. Bilateral relations between France and Russia never became warm. On 7 February 1992, France signed a bilateral treaty, recognizing Russia as a successor of the USSR.

During the Russo-Georgian War, Nicolas Sarkozy did not insist on the territorial integrity of Georgia. Moreover, there were no French protests when Russia failed to obey Sarkozy's deal to withdraw from Georgia and recognizing governments in Georgia's territories.

A piece of major news was the sale of Mistral-class amphibious assault ships to Russia. The deal which was signed in 2010, was the first major arms deal between Russia and the Western world since World War II. The deal was criticised for neglecting the security interests of Poland, the Baltic states, Ukraine, and Georgia. In 2015, France stopped the planned sale after the outbreak of the conflict in eastern Ukraine. In that same year, France instead sold the two Mistral warships to Egypt.

=== 2015–2022 ===
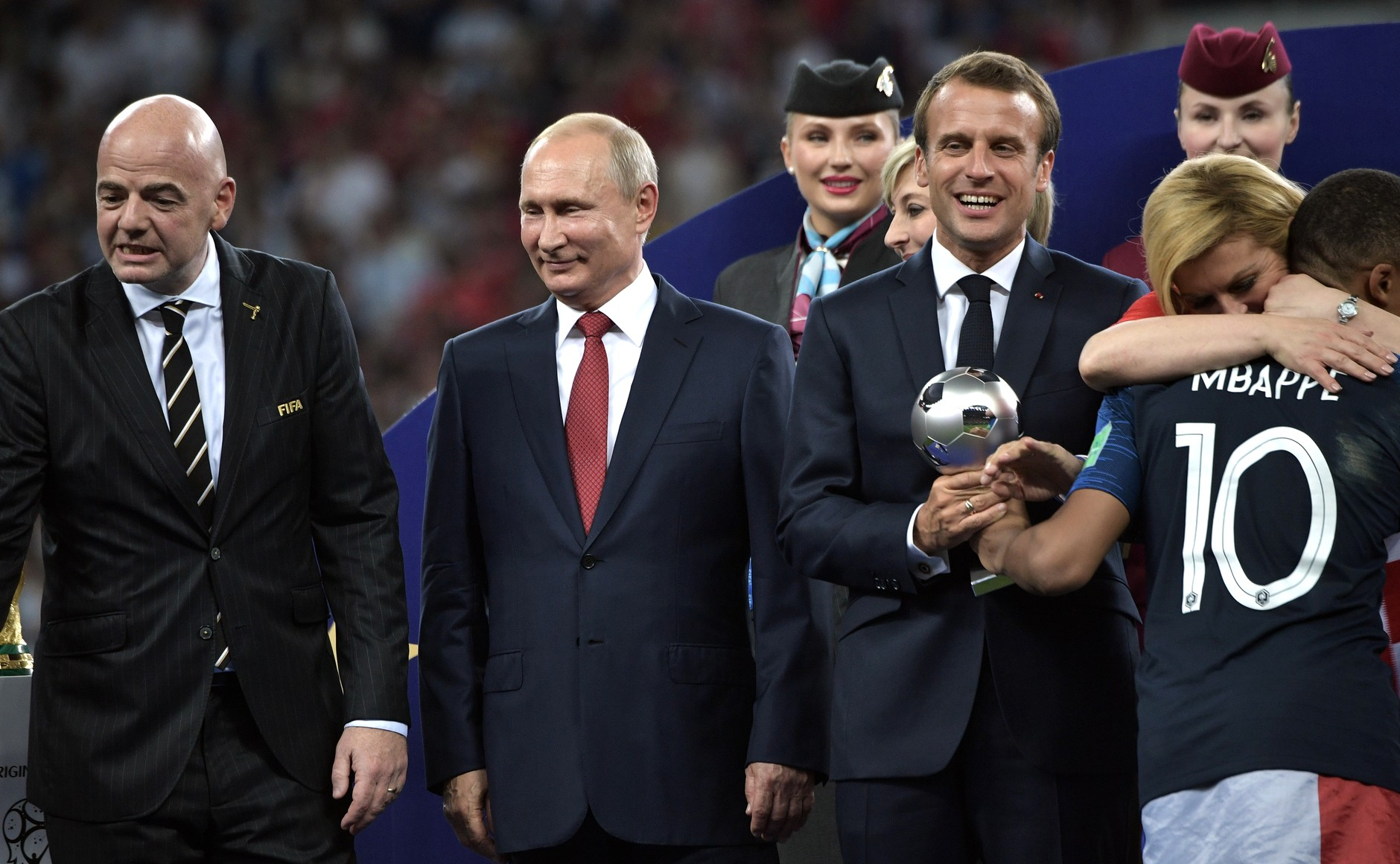
Russian President Vladimir Putin and French President Emmanuel Macron at the 2018 FIFA World Cup Final in Russia

France and Russia were both attacked by the group ISIS. As a response, François Hollande and Vladimir Putin agreed on ordering cooperation between their respective armed forces against the terrorist organisation. The French President called upon the international community to bring "together of all those who can realistically fight against this terrorist army in a large and unique coalition." The French-Russian bombing cooperation was considered to be an "unprecedented" move, given that France is a member of NATO.

The French press highlighted that ISIS was the two countries' first common enemy since World War II. A Russian newspaper recalled that "WWII had forced the Western World and the Soviet Union to overcome their ideological differences", wondering whether ISIS would be the "new Hitler".

According to a 2017 Pew Global Attitudes Project survey, 36% of French people had a favourable view of Russia and 62% an unfavourable view. A 2018 opinion poll published by the Russian Public Opinion Research Center showed that 81% of Russians had a favourable view of France and 19% an unfavourable view.

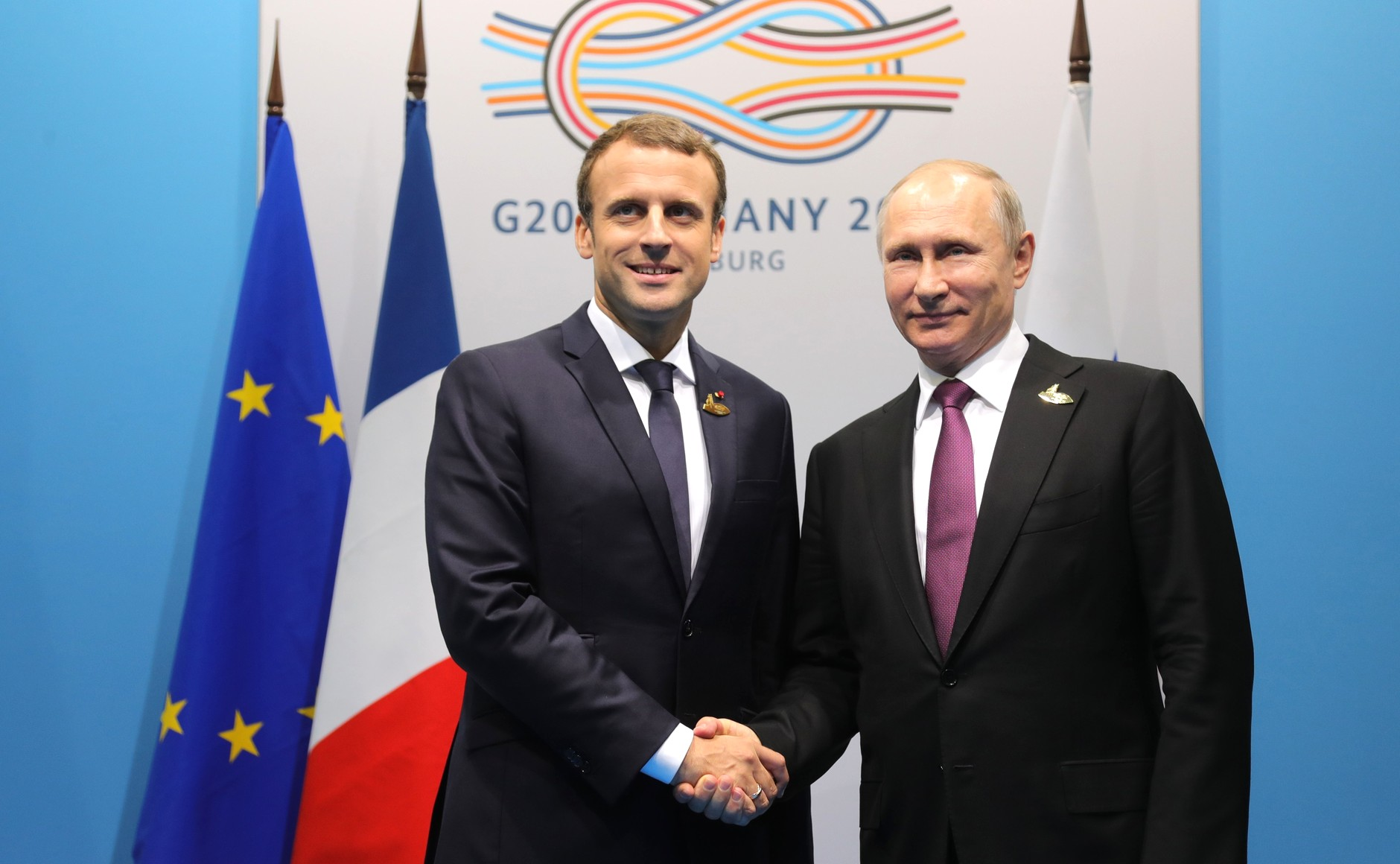
Russian President Vladimir Putin and French President Emmanuel Macron meet in Hamburg, Germany at the G20 summit, in July 2017

A poll conducted by YouGov in 2015 found that only 15% of French people believed that the Soviet Union contributed most to the defeat of Nazi Germany in World War II, a decline from 57% in the same survey in May 1945.

On 29 August 2020, the French Defense Minister Florence Parly informed that a senior military officer came under investigation for sharing the ultra-sensitive information to the Russian intelligence. The lieutenant-colonel was accused of "serious security breaches", for which he was facing legal proceedings.

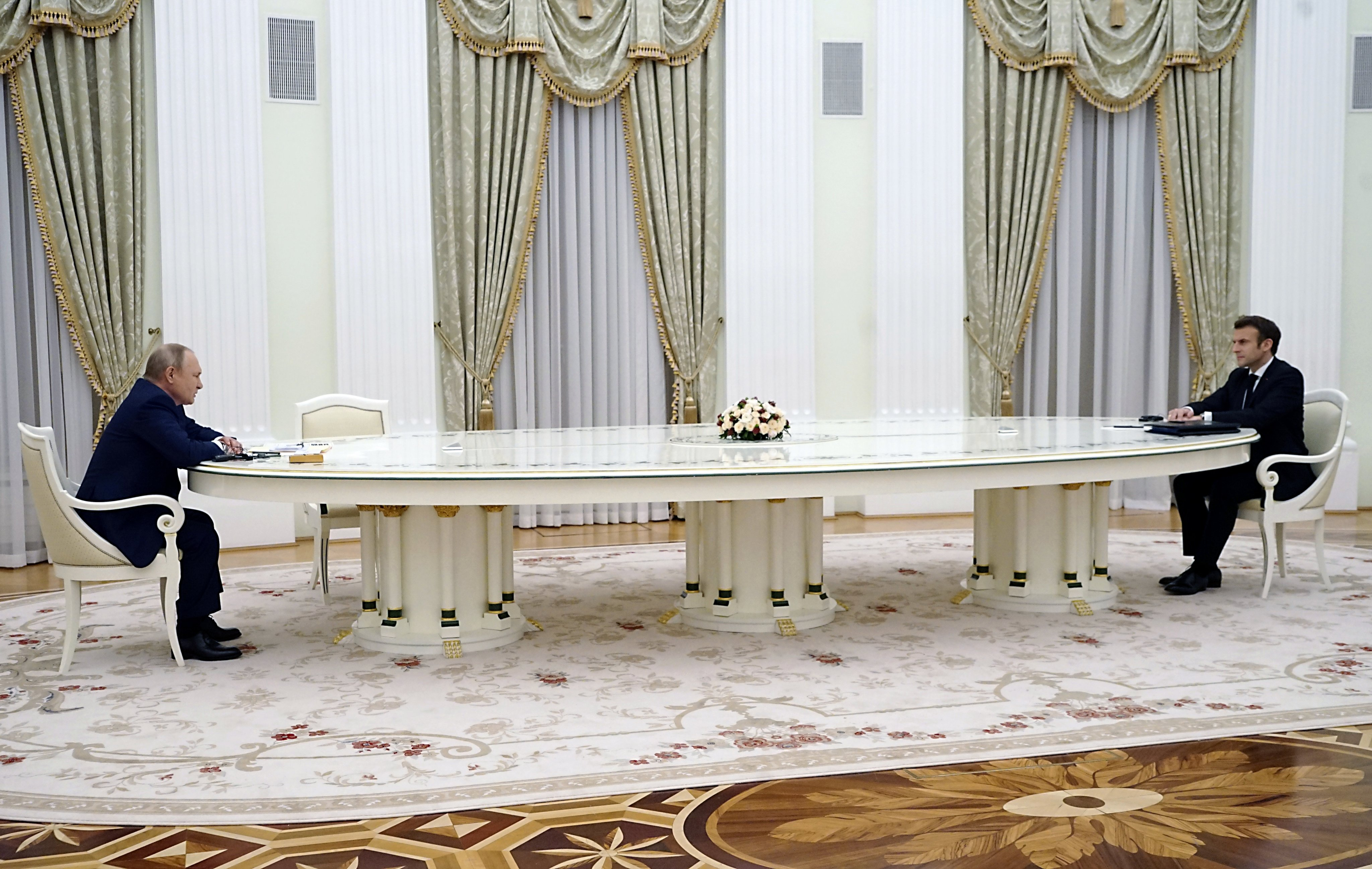
Russian President Vladimir Putin with French President Emmanuel Macron in the Kremlin, 7 February 2022

On 20 February 2022, French President Emmanuel Macron and Russian President Vladimir Putin agreed to work toward a ceasefire in eastern Ukraine. The two leaders also agreed on "the importance of favouring a diplomatic solution to the present crisis and doing all possible to achieve one," according to the Élysée, with French Foreign Minister Jean-Yves Le Drian and his Russian counterpart Sergey Lavrov meeting "in the coming days."

=== After the Russian invasion of Ukraine ===
France has been on Russia's "Unfriendly Countries List" since 2022. Countries and territories on the list (red) have imposed or joined sanctions against Russia.

After the 2022 Russian invasion of Ukraine started, France, as one of the EU countries, imposed sanctions on Russia, and Russia added all EU countries to the list of "unfriendly nations". On 5 June 2022, French finance minister Bruno Le Maire stated that France is currently in talks with the United Arab Emirates, intending to replace Russian oil imports due to the imposition of the European Union ban.

Since Macron took power in France, Russian-French relations have remained at a standstill. According to Macron, "the war will continue" and he urged the French people "to prepare for the scenario where we all have to go without Russian gas." Macron's government has urged a "sobriety plan" to conserve energy rather than seek better diplomatic relations with the Russian Federation. France's anti-disinformation watchdog, Viginum, has been principally focused on countering Russian disinformation since the start of the war.

In January 2024, Russia summoned the French ambassador to the Foreign Ministry over allegations that French mercenaries have been fighting on Ukraine's side against Russia's invasion.

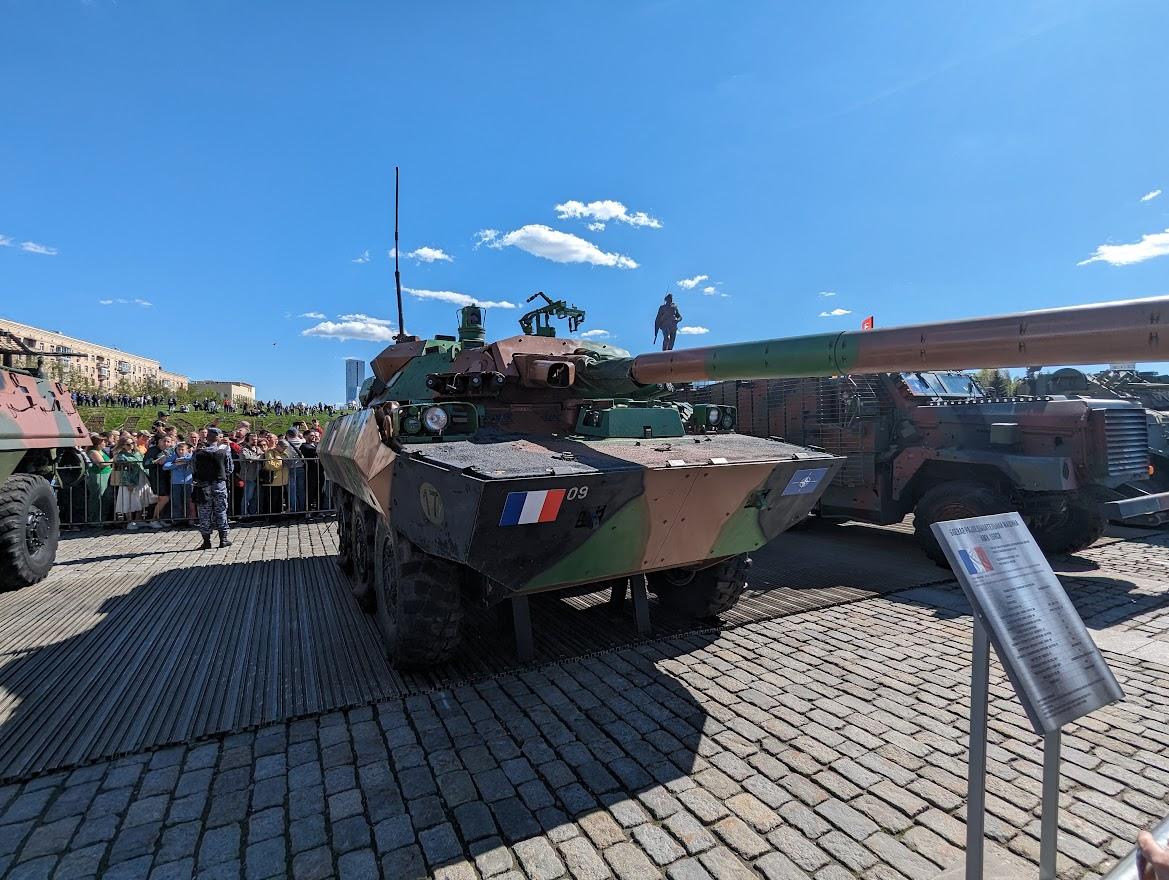
Captured AMX-10 RC in Ukrainian service on public display in Moscow, 7 May 2024

On 28 May 2024, French President Emmanuel Macron gave Ukraine permission to use SCALP EG missiles against targets on Russian soil. Such usage was instructed to be limited "to neutralize military sites from which missiles are being fired, military sites from which Ukraine is being attacked".

== French intelligence services in Russia ==
In 1980, France's domestic intelligence service, the DST recruited KGB officer Vladimir Vetrov as a double agent. The French DST later worked with the U.S. CIA and the Canadian CSIS to an operation to funnel faulty computer technology to the Soviet Union after leaks revealed that the KGB was trying to acquire Western computer technology through theft and legitimate purchases by front companies.

== Russian intelligence services in France ==
During the Cold War, Russian active measures targeted French public opinion. Some indication of the success is given by polls that showed more French support to the Soviet Union than the United States.

According to French counterintelligence sources in 2010, Russian espionage operations against France have reached levels not seen since the 1980s.

=== Examples of operations ===
Examples of suspected or verified Soviet and Russian operations:

- Agence France-Presse - The Mitrokhin archive identified six agents and two confidential contacts.
- Le Monde - The newspaper (codename VESTNIK, "messenger") was notable for spreading anti-American, pro-Soviet propaganda to the French population. The Mitrokhin archive contains two senior Le Monde journalists and several contributors. Le Monde, through its supplement Le Monde Diplomatique, has been among the Western news outlets most sharply critical of the Mueller investigation.
- La Tribune des Nations - Effectively KGB-run.
- Various bogus biographies.
- Infiltration of Gaullist movement: "More than any other political movement, Gaullism was swarming with agents of influence of the obliging KGB, whom we never succeeded in keeping away from de Gaulle"
- Almost 15 million francs to De Gaulle's campaign, delivered by a businessman recruited by the KGB.
- KGB hired people close to François Mitterrand.
- Agents close to President Georges Pompidou were ordered to manipulate him with disinformation so he would become suspicious of the United States.
- Pierre Charles Pathé - KGB codename PECHERIN (later MASON) ran one of Moscow's disinformation networks for 20 years until French counterintelligence decided to arrest him during a financial transaction.

== Resident diplomatic missions ==
- France has an embassy in Moscow and consulates-general in Saint Petersburg and in Yekaterinburg.
- Russia has an embassy in Paris and consulates-general in Marseille and in Strasbourg and a consular agency in Villefranche-sur-Mer.
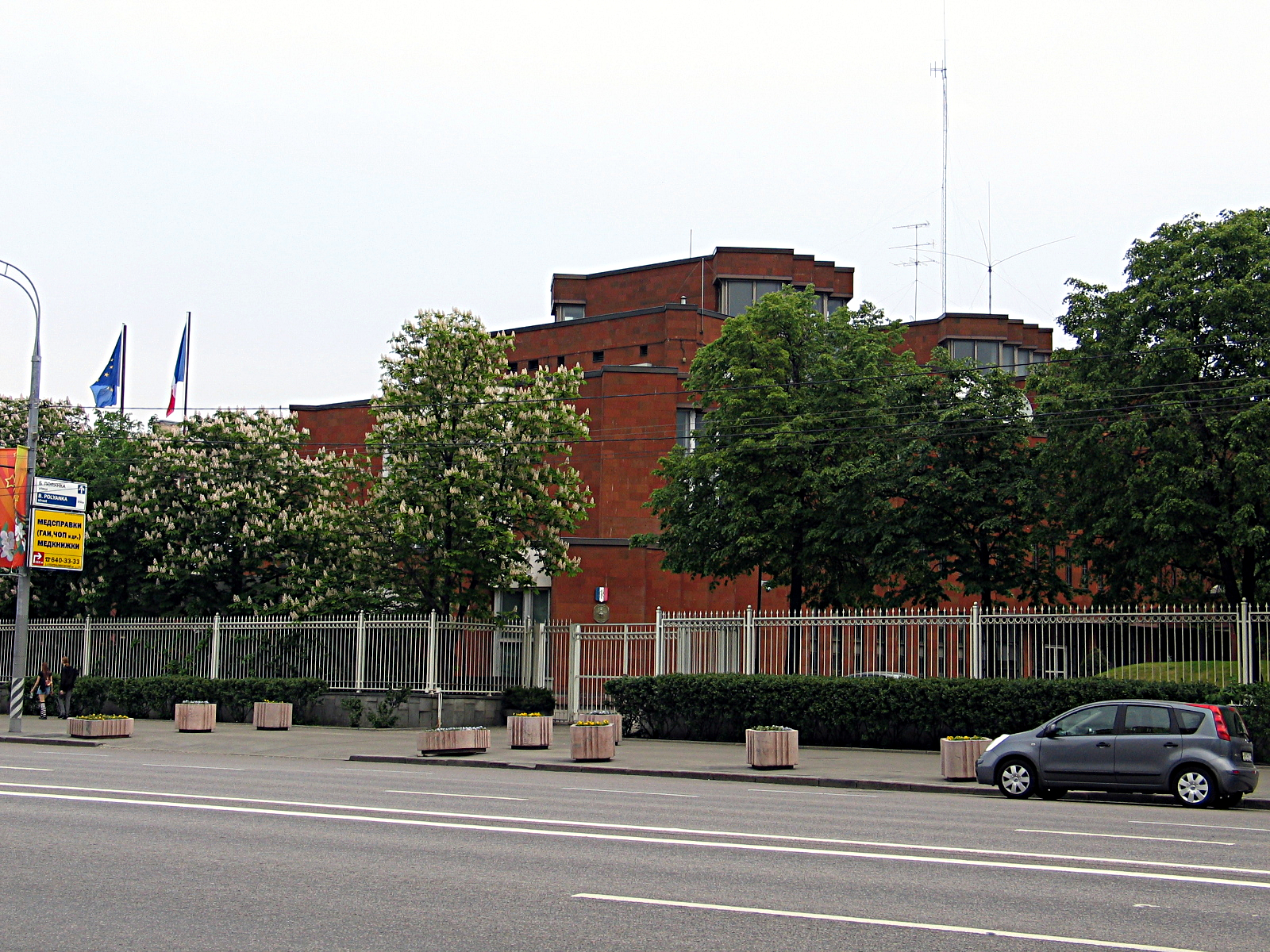
Embassy of France in Moscow

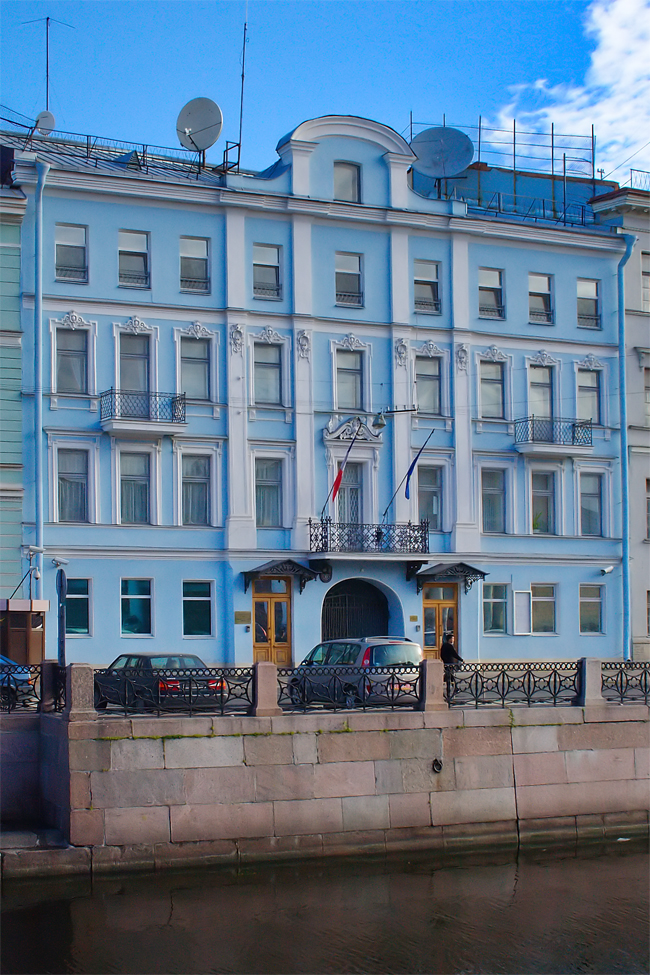
Consulate-General of France in Saint Petersburg
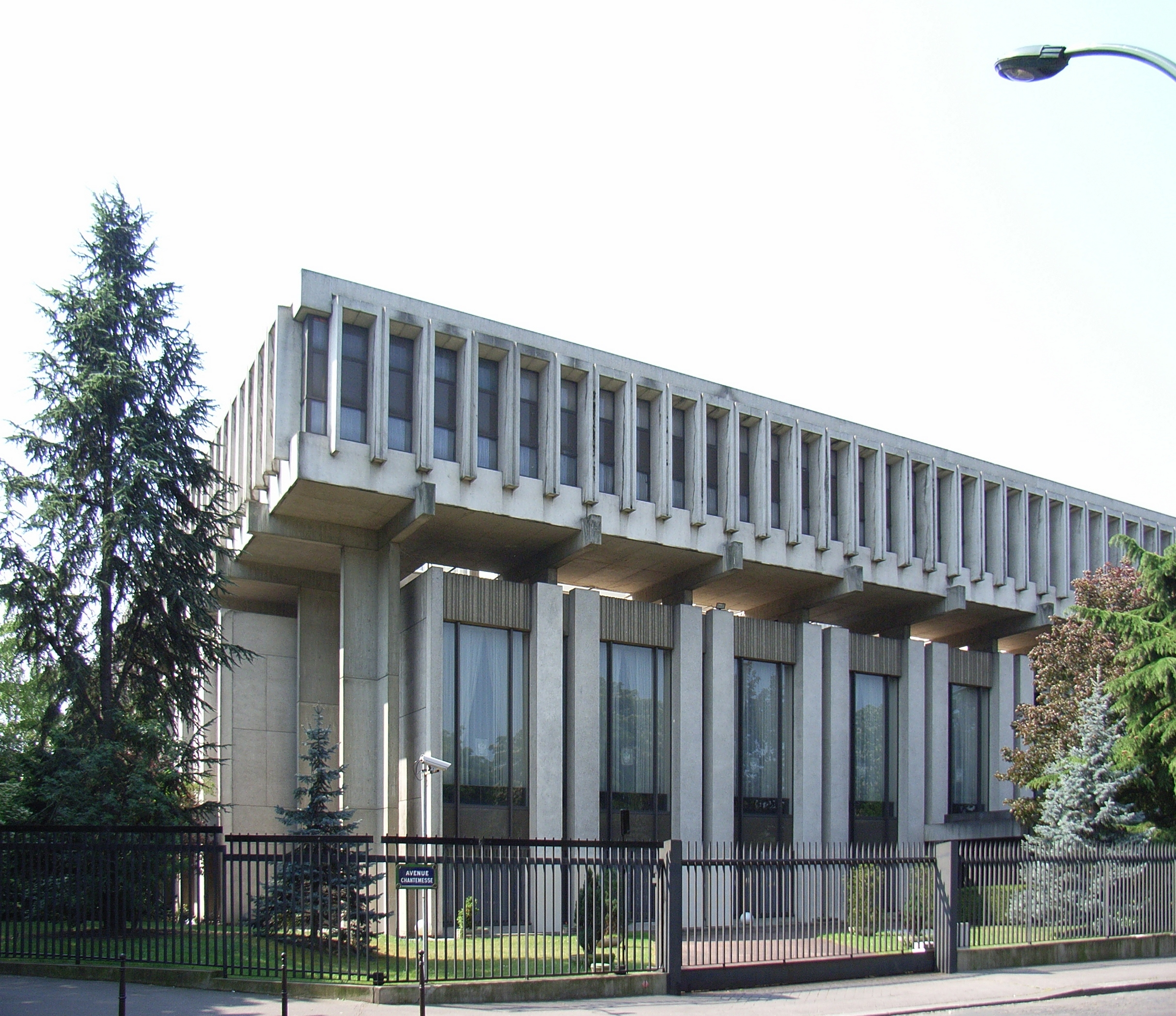
Embassy of Russia in Paris

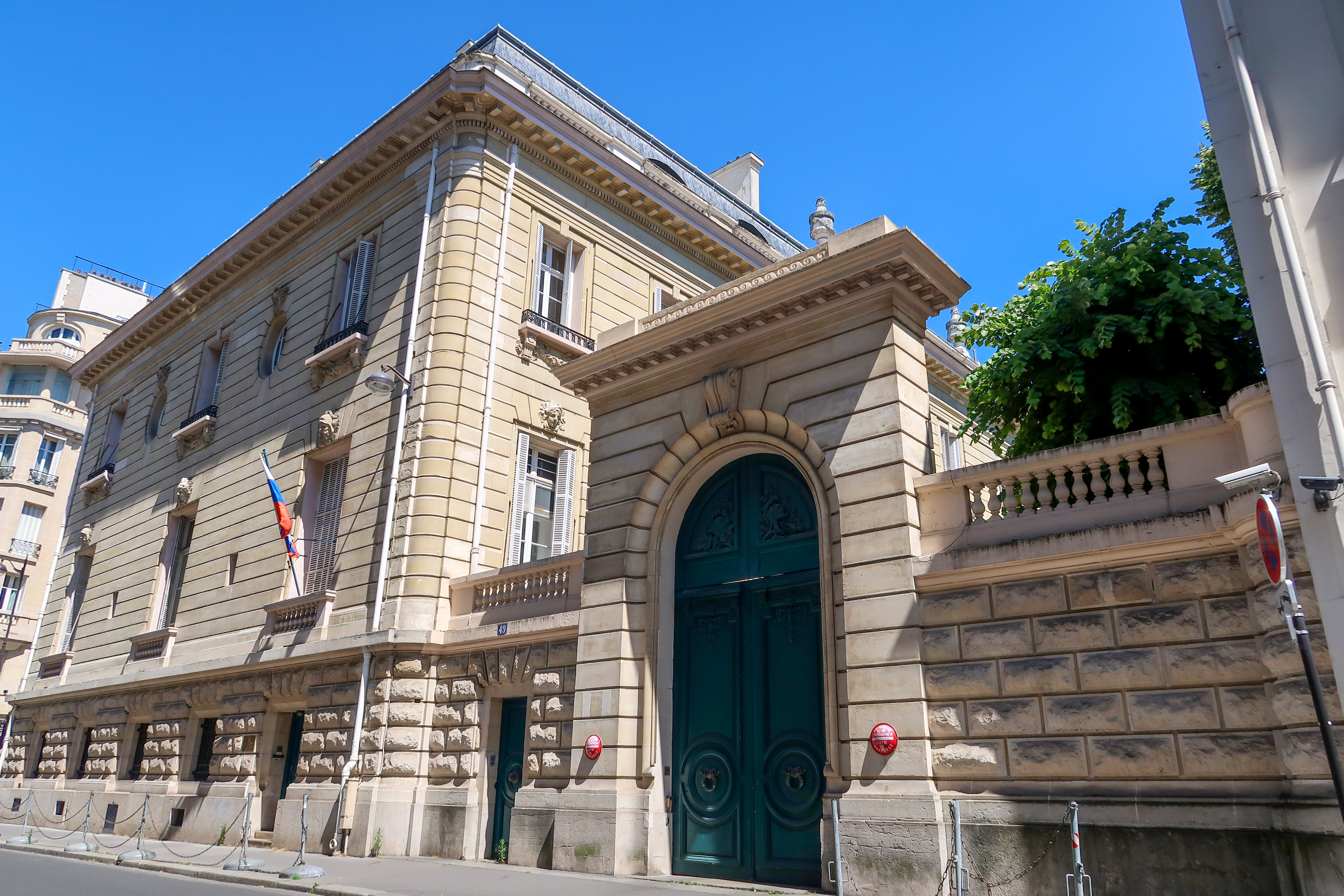
Trade Office of Russia in Paris

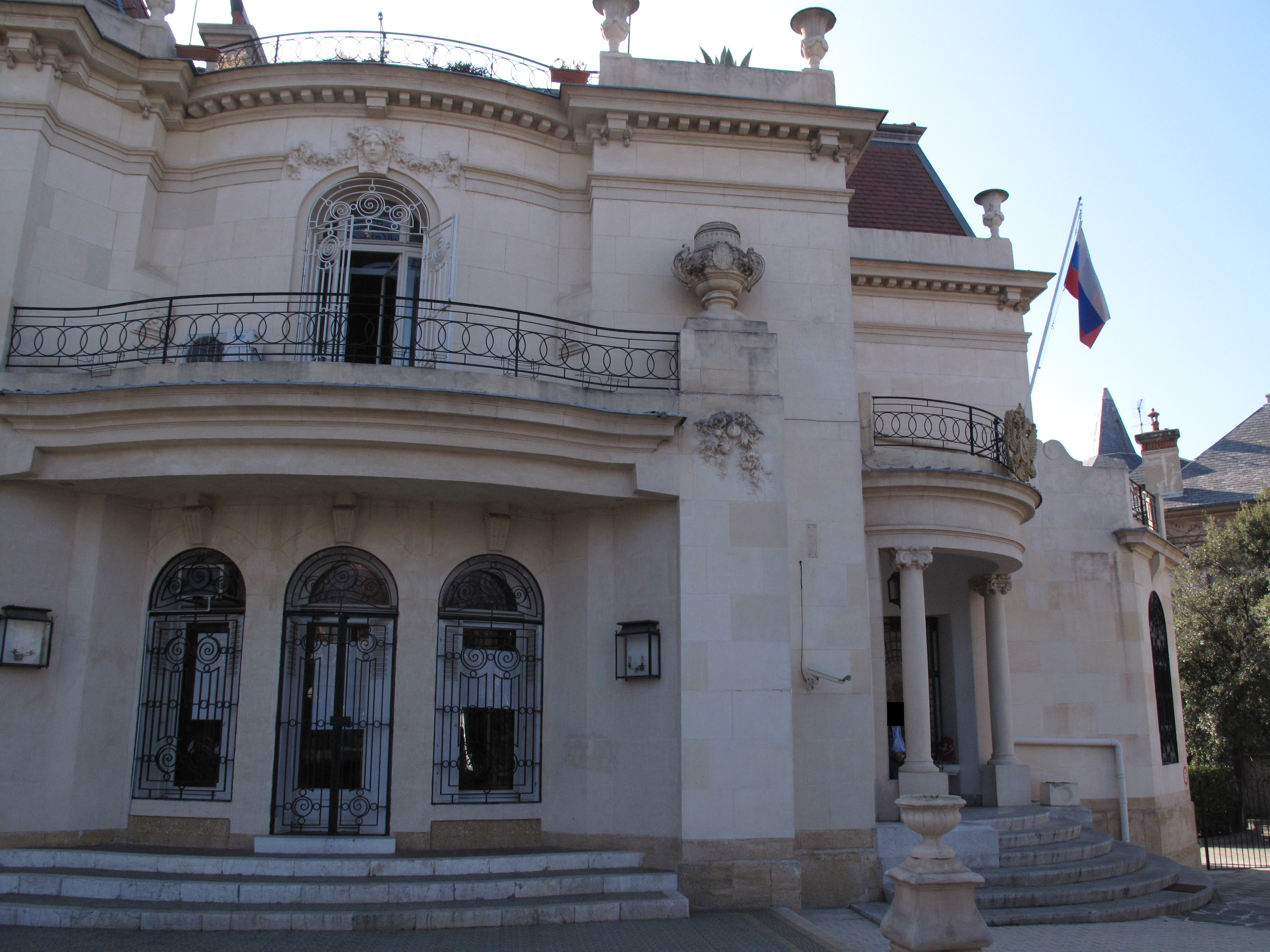
Consulate-General of Russia in Marseille

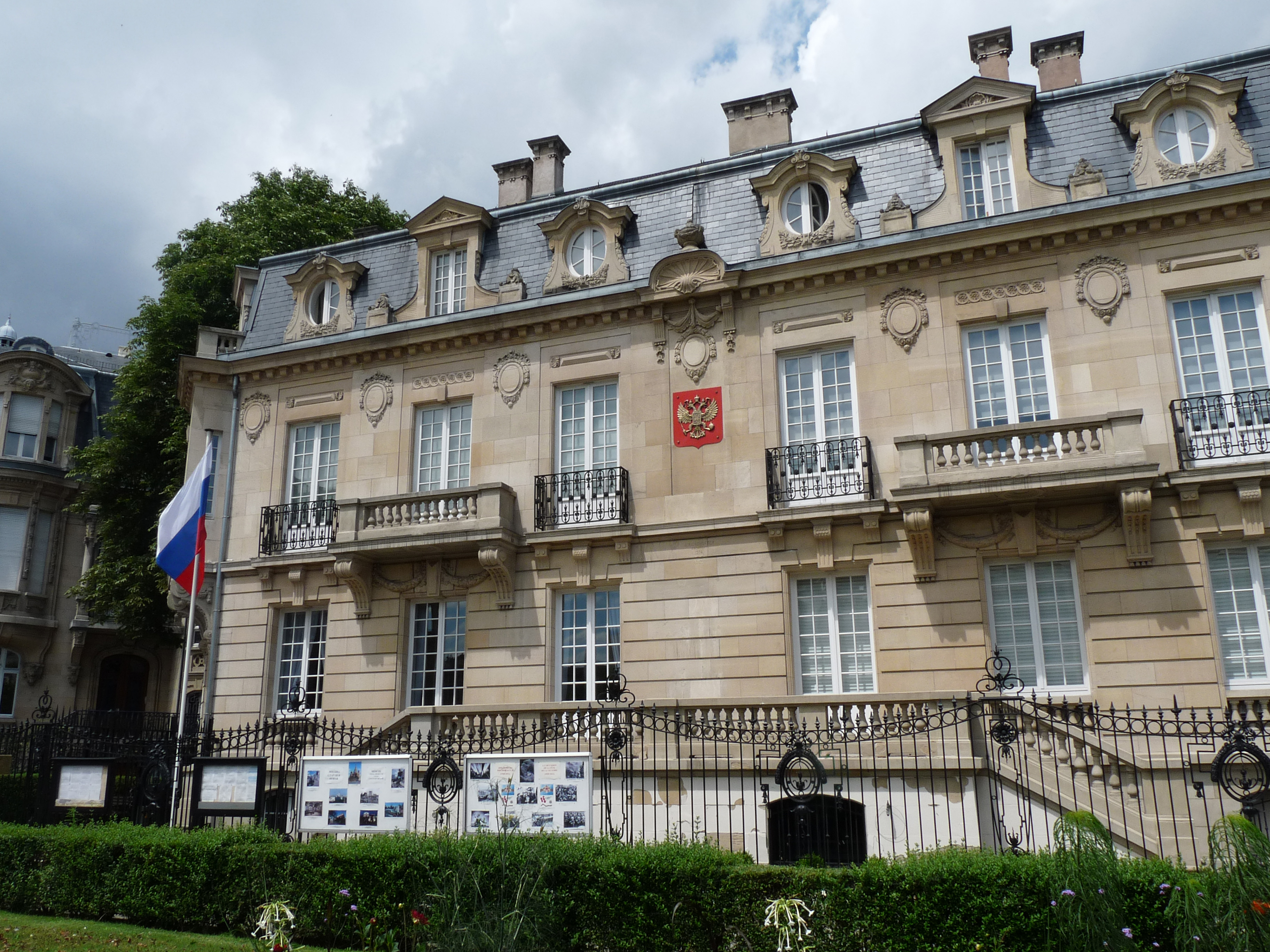
Consulate-General of Russia in Strasbourg

== See also ==
- History of French foreign relations
- Franco-Russian Alliance
- French invasion of Russia
- International relations of the Great Powers (1814–1919)
- Igumnov House
- Lycée Français Alexandre Dumas de Moscou
- Russians in France
- French people in Russia

== Sources ==
- Andrew, Christopher; Mitrokhin, Vasili (2000). The Sword and the Shield: The Mitrokhin Archive and the Secret History of the KGB. New York: Basic Books. ISBN 0-465-00312-5. OL 7593017M.
- Taylor, A. J. P. (1954), The Struggle for Mastery in Europe 1848–1918, Oxford: Oxford University Press, Wikidata Q141715908
