= Établissement La Rochefoucauld =

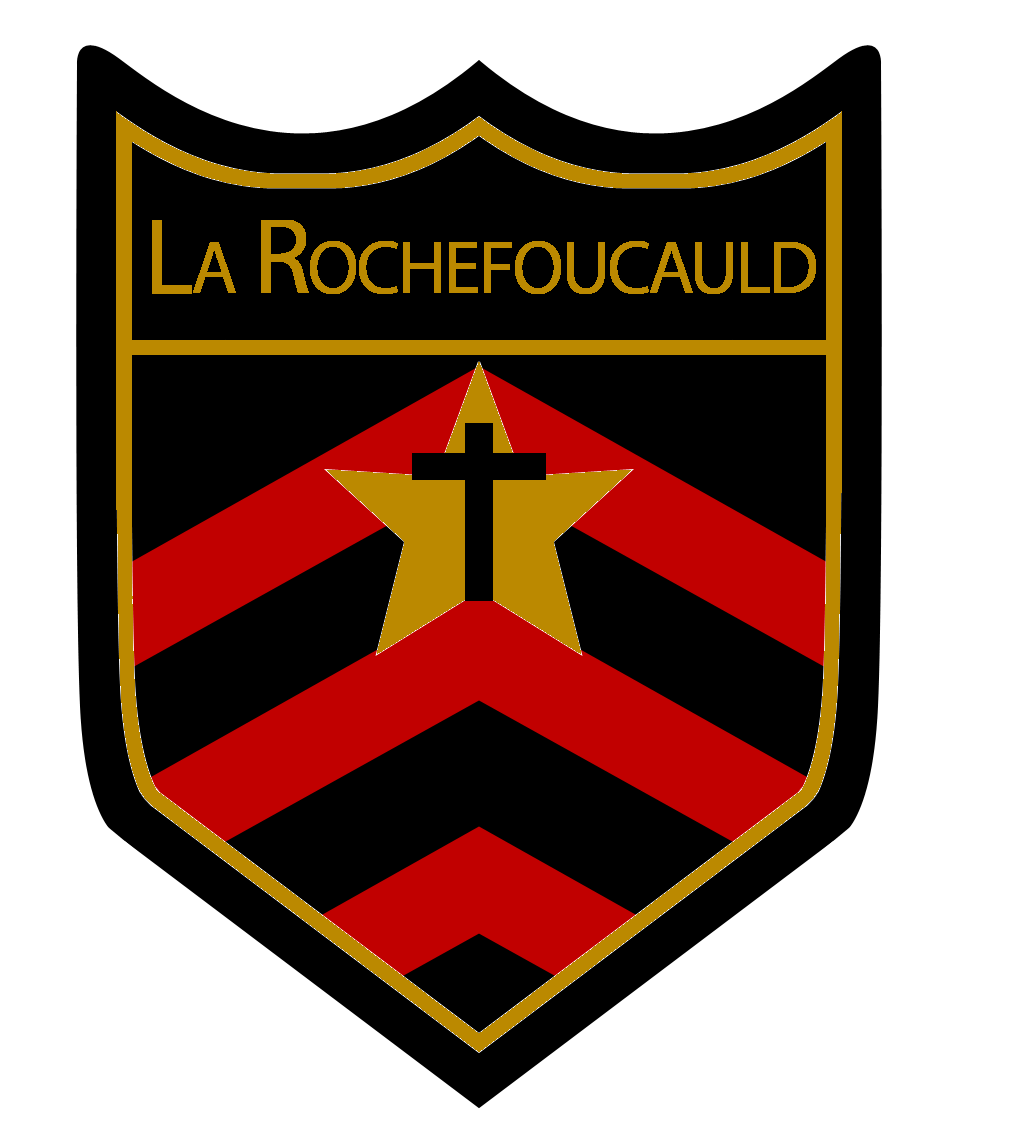

Location
- 90 bis, rue Saint-Dominique; 22 rue Malar, Paris; France
- Coordinates: 48.859958°N 2.305889°E

Information
- Website: laroche.org

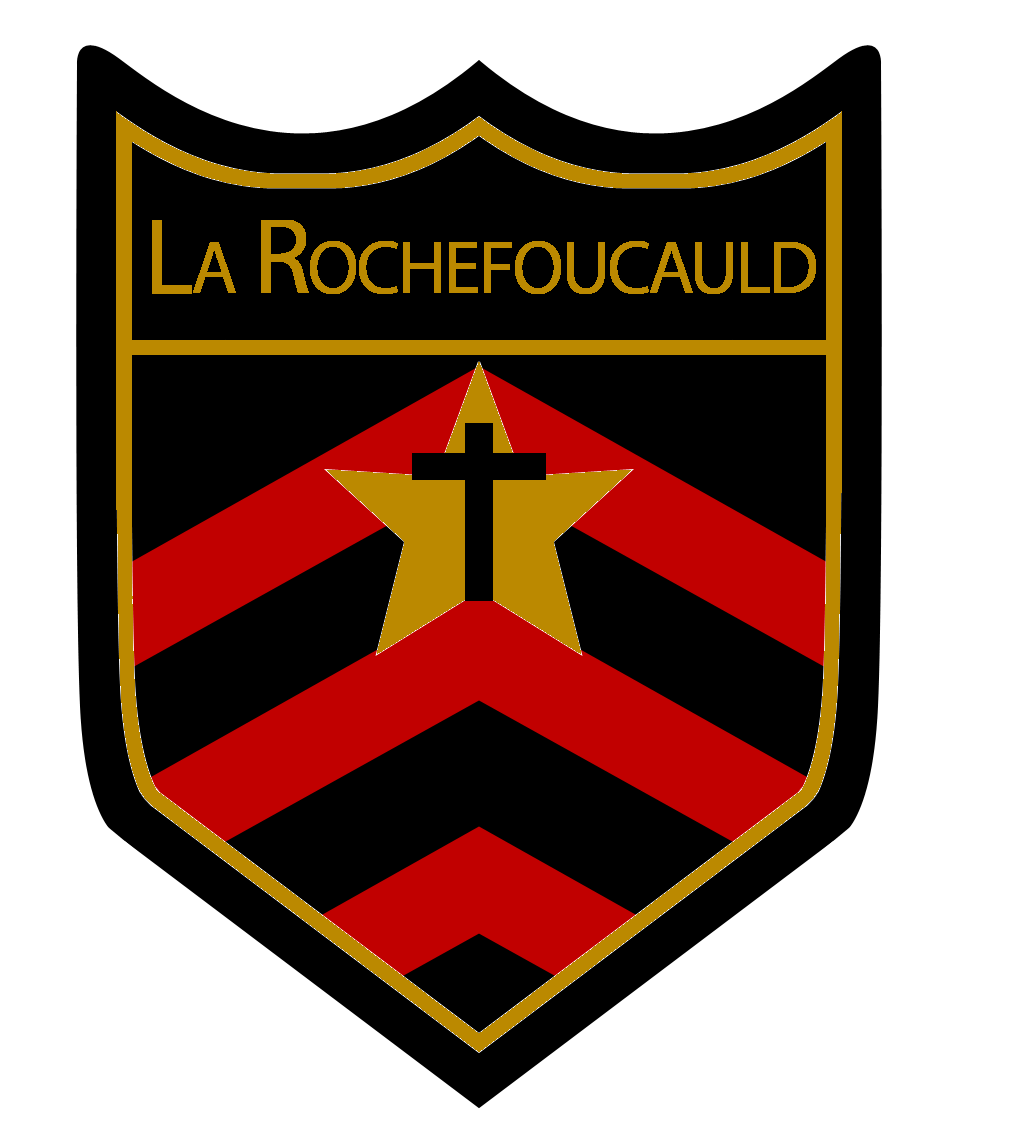
Coat of arms.

The établissement La Rochefoucauld is a private Catholic lycée college under contract to the state and run by the Association LaSalle. It is located in the heart of the 7th arrondissement of Paris in the neighbourhood of Gros-Caillou, not far from the Eiffel Tower.

It consists of a kindergarten with 244 students, a school with 417 students, a college with 474 students, and a lycée with 405 students, giving a total of 1540 students.

The lycée runs courses in bac S (specialising in maths, physics/chemistry and life sciences) and the bac ES (specialising in maths, economics and social sciences and politics), but not the bac L.

In 2017, the establishment celebrated its tricentenary.

== History ==
=== From foundation to the 20th century ===
La Rochefoucauld is an establishment which has always maintained close links with the life of the community around it.

In the 17th century, Les Invalides was created, bringing a number of families of artisans and workers of all kinds to the area. The neighbourhood was attached to the parish of the Church of Saint-Sulpice, Paris, but there was no church or school in the area.

At this time, Jean-Baptiste de La Salle began to organise a community of volunteers known as brothers, devoted to the poor and humble. The number of children they taught continued to grow, and a brother arrived from Rouen with two other brothers from Saint-Yon, to create a school in the area of Gros Caillou.

At the time, numbers were important due to the need for artisans at the École Militaire and mansions.

After the revolution, this ended, and the school in Gros Caillou was closed.

Quite soon after the Revolution, a benefactor, the Marquise de Trans reinstated the school, helped by the brothers. Two hundred children won scholarships to the school, making the first free school in Paris. However, the funds of the Marquise de Trans were not inexhaustible. When she died, the Viscount Sosthènes de La Rochefoucauld, Duke of Doudeauville, helped by the inheritance he received from her, and from his important personal fortune, continued the tradition of education of the brothers and their founder.

=== Since the Second World War ===
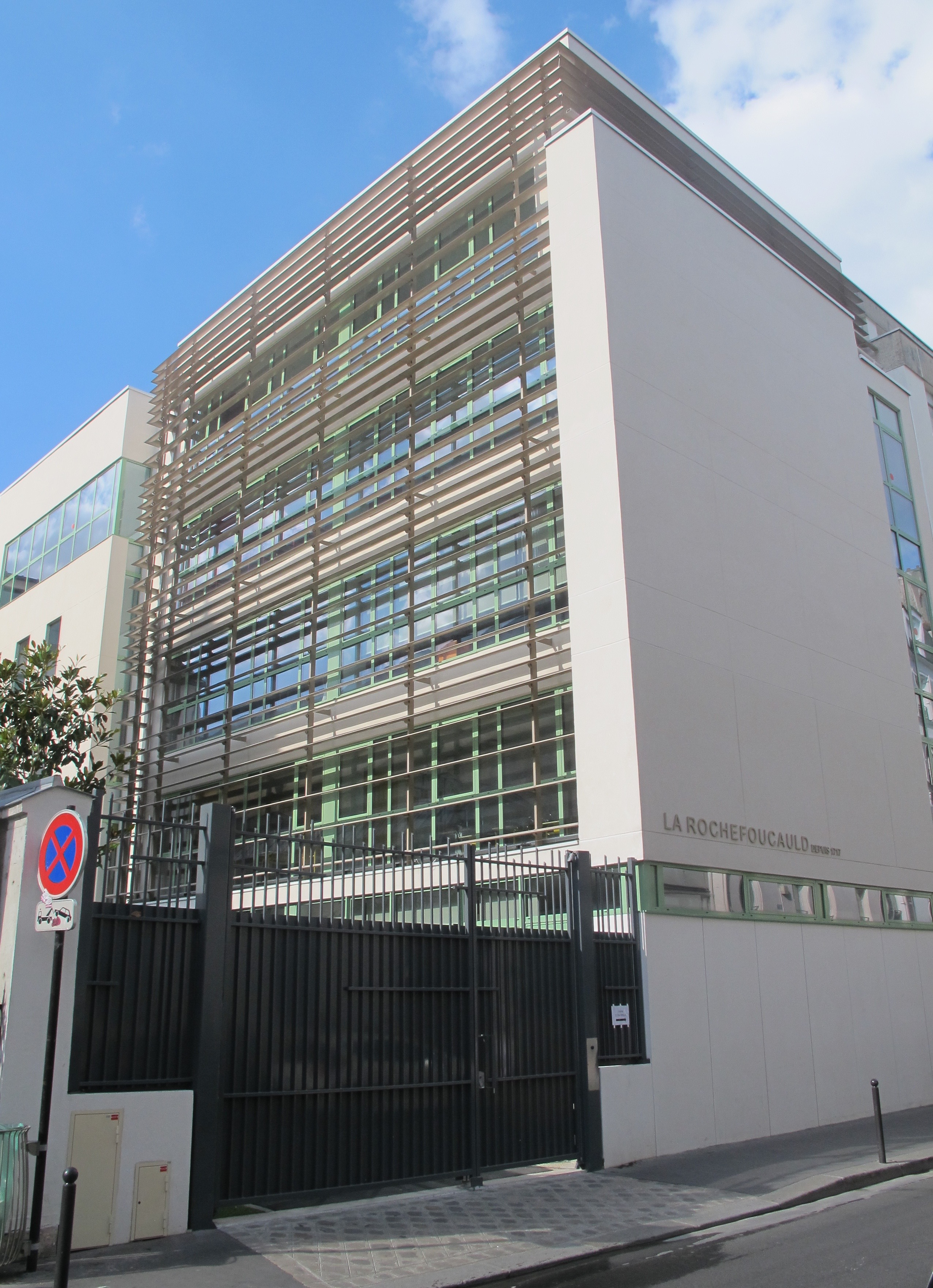
Façade on rue Saint-Dominique.

In the 1950s-1960s, private establishment began to sign contracts with the State, and La Rochefoucauld became one of the first to do so, thanks to the number of licensed teachers and the results obtained in the baccalauréats.

Since then, the establishment has prospered, although the brothers have left. Primary school classes take place on rue Cler, near the location of the Sisters of Saint Vincent de Paul. In 2006, the history of Catholic education in Paris led the La Salle association to include kindergarten education in Saint-Pierre, which began in September 2008.

In 2008, the headteacher of the school was Didier Retourné, who succeeded Étienne Roulleaux-Dugage. In 2010, the title moved to Guillaume Champagne. Then, in 2018, the title is owned by Bruno Lagniez.

In 2011, Jérome Dieuset and Christine Jeancolas succeeded Jocelyne Graux in the respective roles of head of sixth form and fifth year. However, in 2014, Christine Jeancolas succeeded Jérôme Dieuset in the post of head of the sixth form. English began at the CP.

The head of fourth and third year is currently held by Sophie Paix, and the responsibility for student life at the college by Marion Lesage.

There are three classes at primary level, four at college, and two per series at lycée.

== Lycée ranking ==
In 2015, the lycée was ranked 13th of 108 at departmental level in terms of teaching quality, and 28th nationally. The ranking is based on three criteria: the level of bac results, the proportion of students who obtain their baccalauréat having studied at the school for the last two years, and the added value (calculated based on social origin of the students, age, and their diploma results).

== Alumni ==
- Nicolas Dupont-Aignan, politician
- Jules Rimet, founder of FIFA
- Geoffroy Didier, politician
- Pierre-André de Chalendar, PDG de Saint-Gobain
- Karl Zéro, TV presenter
- Quentin Postel, member of Fauve (group)
