= Lycée Saint-Thomas-d'Aquin =

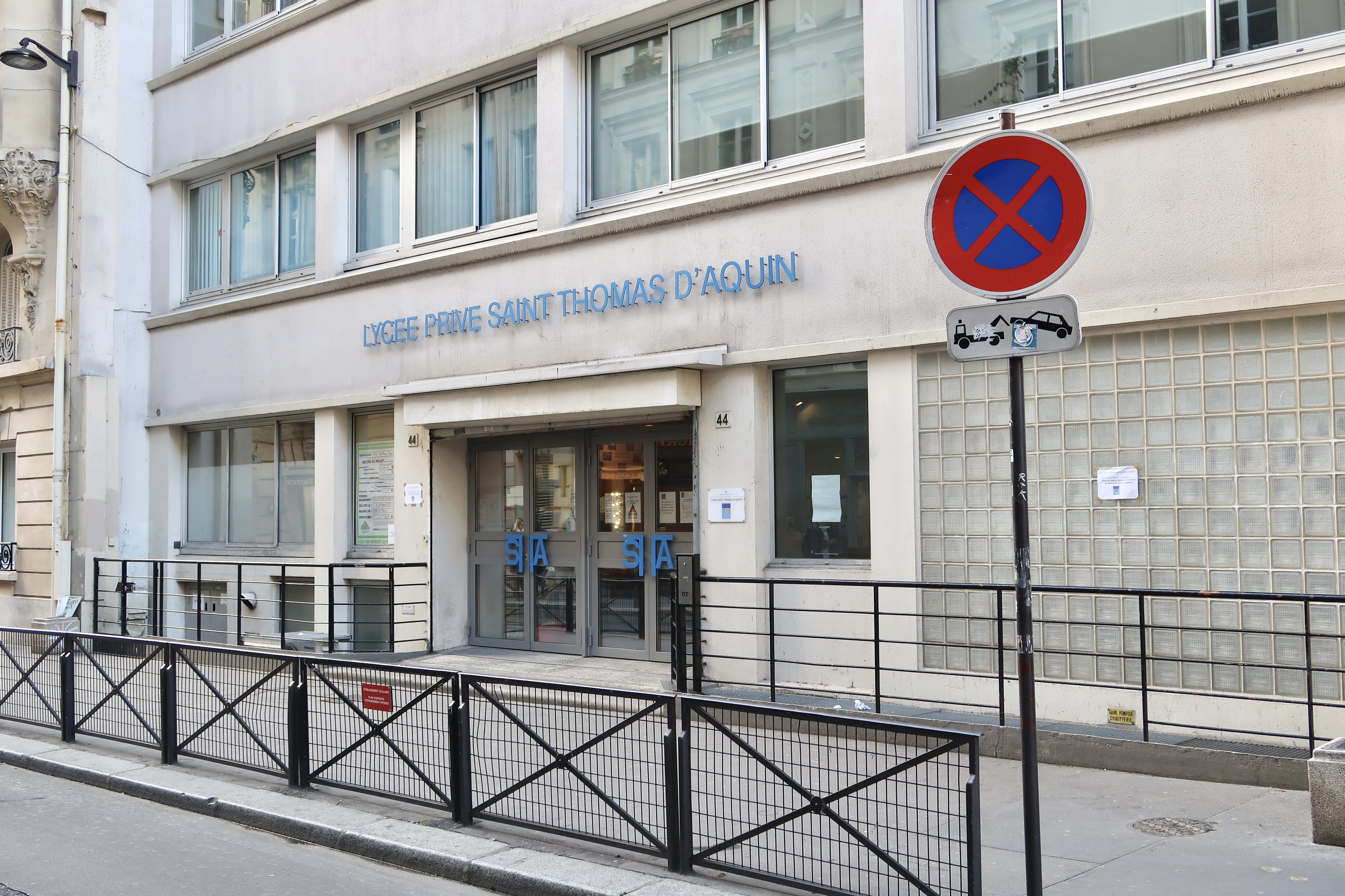

Location
- 44 Rue de Grenelle; Paris, 75007; France; 48.854187°N 2.326838°E

Information
- Other names: École des Frères des écoles chrétiennes de la paroisse Saint-Thomas-d’Aquin
- School type: Private under contract with the State
- School district: Académie de Paris
- Dean: Antoine Thénault
- Grades: Seconde, Première, Terminale
- Enrollment: 500
- Campus size: Small
- Campus type: Urban
- Website: lyceesta.fr//

The Lycée Saint-Thomas-d’Aquin (formerly known as the École des Frères des écoles chrétiennes de la paroisse Saint-Thomas-d’Aquin) is a Catholic (private under contract) upper-secondary educational institution located in the heart of the 7th arrondissement of Paris, France. It is notably famous for having once been the establishment where widely celebrated French statesman Général Charles de Gaulle, figurehead of the French Résistance effort during WWII and later elected President of France, undertook his primary studies.

Since then, the original building was destroyed to leave place for a new educational complex outfitted with the equipment necessary to adapt to pupils' ever-growing learning needs. After completion of the construction endeavor, the school underwent a strategic reorganization that led to the termination of primary education services altogether and shifted focus toward older pupils in the upper-secondary stage of their educational curriculum (i.e. lycée)

Father Raymond-Jacques Tournay, a renowned Biblical scholar, member of the École Biblique, and fierce participant in the French Résistance during the WWII Nazi Occupation of France, also attended the school to complete his primary education .

More recently, notable alumni include actresses Élodie Bouchez and Ana Girardot, amongst others.

== Name and history ==
Thomas Aquinas was one of the major Doctors of the Church of the Middle Ages. The name of Saint Thomas Aquinas was also given to the nearby Église Saint-Thomas-d'Aquin (Paris), built in the 17th century, and to the neighboring parish. It is also given to the neighborhood.

== Current establishment ==
Today, the lycée Saint-Thomas-d’Aquin is a lycée of general French Catholic private education, under contract in association with the state, located at 44, rue de Grenelle in Paris (7th arrondissement of Paris) with mathematics instructor, Antoine Thénault (CAER-CAPES), serving as headmaster since August 2021.

=== Classes ===
Today, the establishment consists of around 12 classes from the second year to finish, and includes Baccalauréat. There are also options in languages, economics, maths, and sciences, with specialities including theatre, plastic arts, and sport. Languages include English, German, Spanish, and Italian. The lycée also offer a special option: a second year immersion in the USA. The results for the Baccalauréat in 2010 were at 96% compared to an expected result of 94%. In 2017, the level of results was at 100%.

=== Ranking of the Lycée ===
In 2015, the lycée ranked 32nd of 109 at departmental level in terms of teaching quality, and 288th at national level. The ranking was based on three criteria: the level of bac results, the proportion of students who achieved their baccalauréat and spent their last two years at the establishment, and the added value (calculated based on social origin of the students, their age, and their diploma results).

== Headmasters ==
- 2002-2014 : Bernard Veillé
- 2014-2021 : Olivier Duchenoy
- 2021–Present : Antoine Thénault

== Other schools of the same name ==
- Lycée Saint-Thomas-d’Aquin in Flers, Orne (61).
- Collège lycée privés Saint-Thomas-d’Aquin in Saint-Jean-de-Luz (64)
- Lycée Saint-Thomas-d'Aquin in Lyon (69)
- École-collège-lycée Saint-Thomas-d’Aquin in Marseille (13)
