= Musée de l'Ordre de la Libération =

Military museum in Paris, France

Coordinates: 48°51′23″N 2°18′41″E

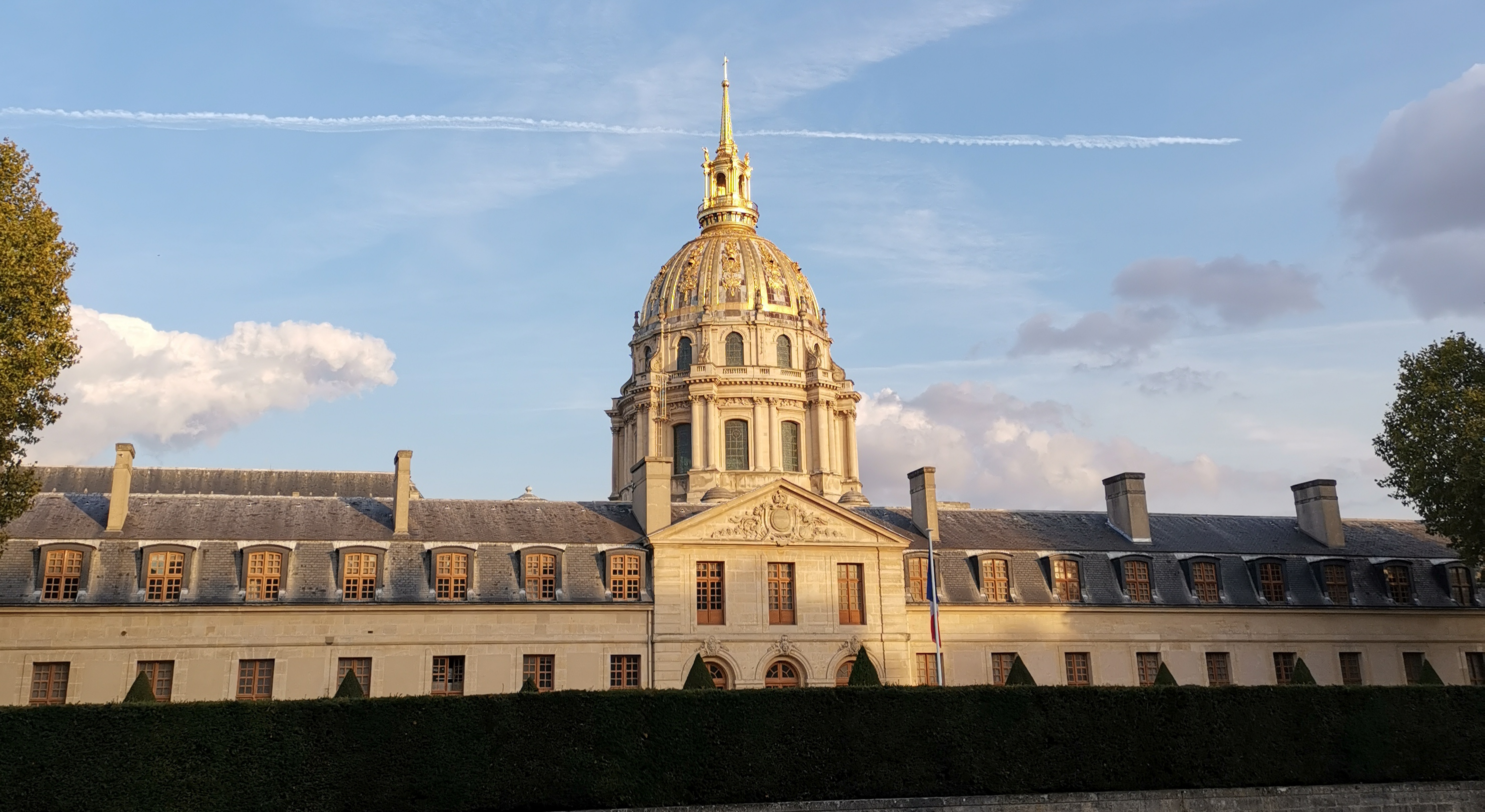
The Hôtel des Invalides hosts the museum

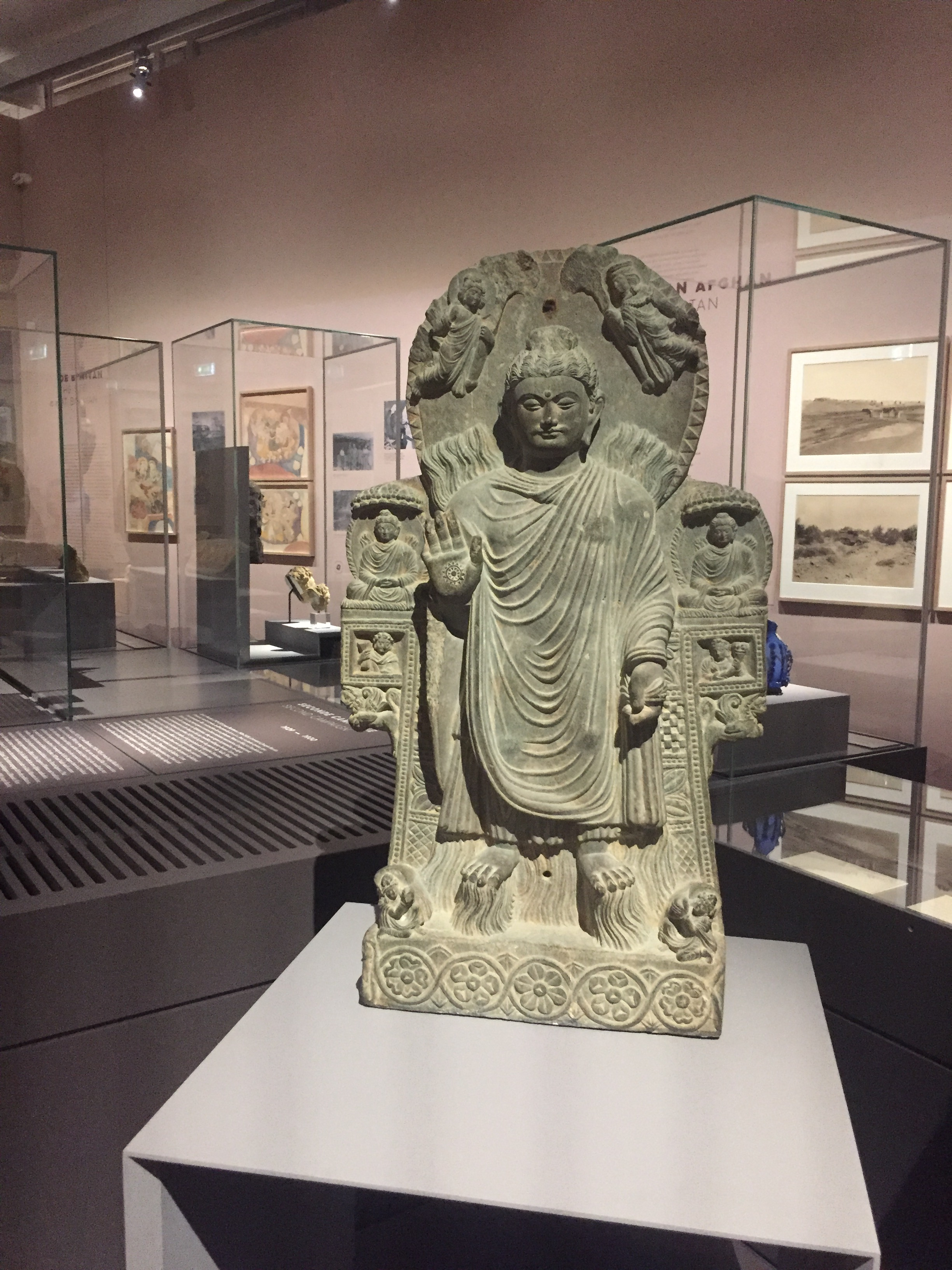
Interior of the museum

The Musée de l'Ordre de la Libération (French pronunciation: [myze d(ə) lɔʁdʁ(ə) də la libeʁɑsjɔ̃]) is a military museum located in the 7th arrondissement of Paris, France. The museum is dedicated to the Ordre de la Libération, France's second national order after the Légion d'honneur, which was created in 1940 by General Charles de Gaulle, leader of the Free French Forces. In 1967 de Gaulle moved the Order of the Liberation into Les Invalides.

The museum contains three galleries and six rooms, with a total area of 1,000 square metres (11,000 sq ft), and documents the history of the Free French Forces, de Gaulle's manuscripts, resistance activities, and the concentration camps. Display cases contain more than 4,000 objects including uniforms, weapons, clandestine press and leaflets, transmitters, flags taken to the enemy on the battlefields of Africa and Europe, the first naval flags of Free France, and relics from the camps. The hall of honor is dedicated to General de Gaulle.

== See also ==
- List of museums in Paris
