= Quartier du Gros-Caillou =

Coordinates: 48.8555924°N 2.3029614°E

Gros-Caillou
- Quartier du Gros-Caillou
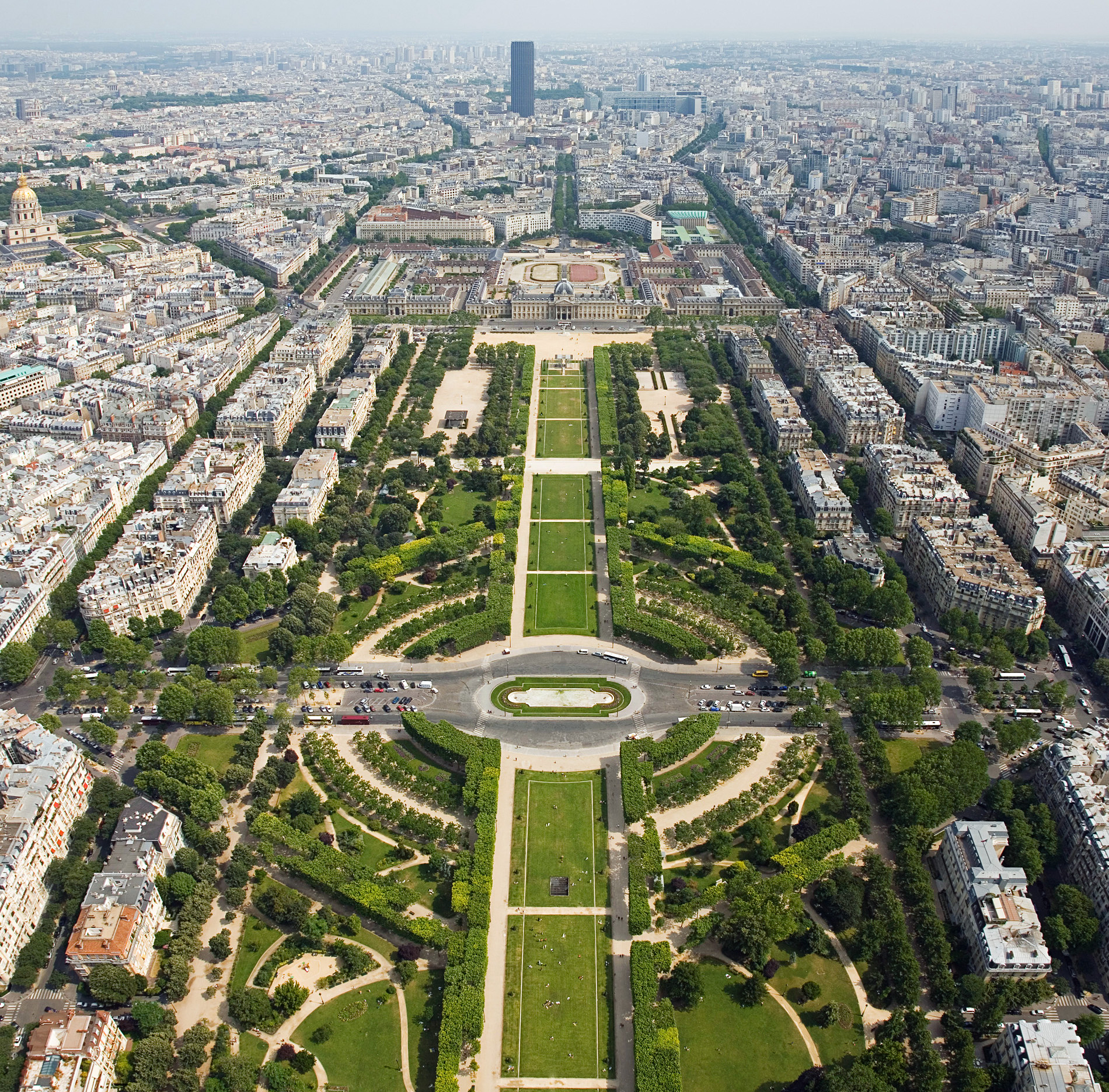
- Champ de Mars
- Interactive map of Gros-Caillou
- Country: France
- Region: Île-de-France
- Ville: Paris
- Arrondissement: 7th

Area
  - Total: 1.383 km^{2} (0.534 sq mi)

Population (2016)
  - Total: 24,161
  - Density: 17,470/km^{2} (45,200/sq mi)

The Quartier du Gros-Caillou is the 28th administrative district of Paris, located in the 7th arrondissement.

== Origin of the name ==
The name likely originates from a natural landmark—perhaps a block of stone dating back to prehistoric times—that served to mark the boundary between the lordships of Saint-Germain and Sainte-Geneviève. This site, first recorded in documents from 1510 and 1523, was also known as "Vert-Buisson."

Quarters of the 7th arrondissement.

== History ==
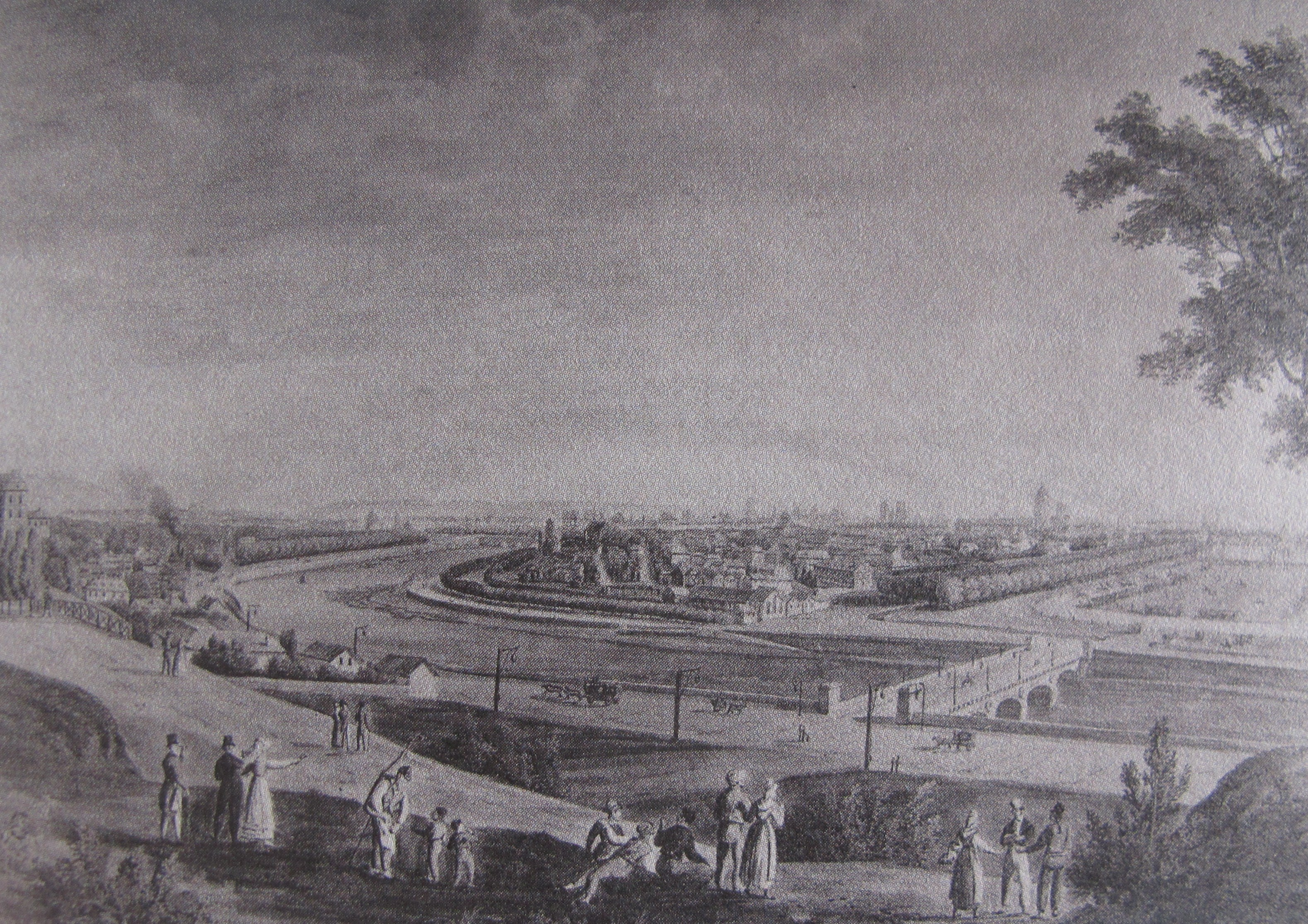
The parish of Le Gros-Caillou in the early 19th century (1820s or 1830s), as seen from Chaillot.

In the 19th century, a tobacco factory was located here on the Quai d'Orsay. Nearby, there was also a facility for processing animal offal, as well as a steam-powered pumping station—a combination that led the site to be regarded as "one of the largest industrial complexes in Paris, employing thousands of workers" and "one of the worst sites for industrial pollution." In 1828, the chemist Jean Pierre Joseph d'Arcet installed a fourneau à réverbère fumivore (a furnace equipped with a smoke-capturing hood) in an effort to reduce exhaust emissions. However, subsequent attempts to address air pollution—part of broader public health initiatives—proved unsuccessful; the Conseil d'hygiène publique et de salubrité (Council for Public Health and Hygiene) noted a "negligence" in the "use of smoke-abatement measures," thereby validating the "well-founded" complaints of local residents. Conversely, in 1868, Maxime Du Camp was able to report the following in the Revue des Deux Mondes:

"Two immense brick chimneys, topped with lightning rods, appear useless, as no plume of smoke ever crowns them. Yet, one can hear the steady clatter of steam engines and the roar of furnaces devouring coal."

The factory was permanently closed in 1905 and demolished in 1909. In its place, a new tobacco factory was constructed in Issy-les-Moulineaux between 1900 and 1904.
