= Cathedral of Saint-Louis-des-Invalides, Paris =

Roman Catholic cathedral in Paris, France

The Cathedral of Saint-Louis-des-Invalides (French: Cathédrale Saint-Louis-des-Invalides) is a Roman Catholic cathedral in the 7th arrondissement of Paris which serves as the seat of the bishop to the members of the French armed forces. It is located within the park of Les Invalides, the home for French army veterans. It was commissioned by King Louis XIV and was built beginning in 1676 by architect Jules Hardouin-Mansart. It is located directly behind and adjoining the Dome Church of Les Invalides.

The nave of the church displays flags captured by the French army in various wars and conflicts over its history.

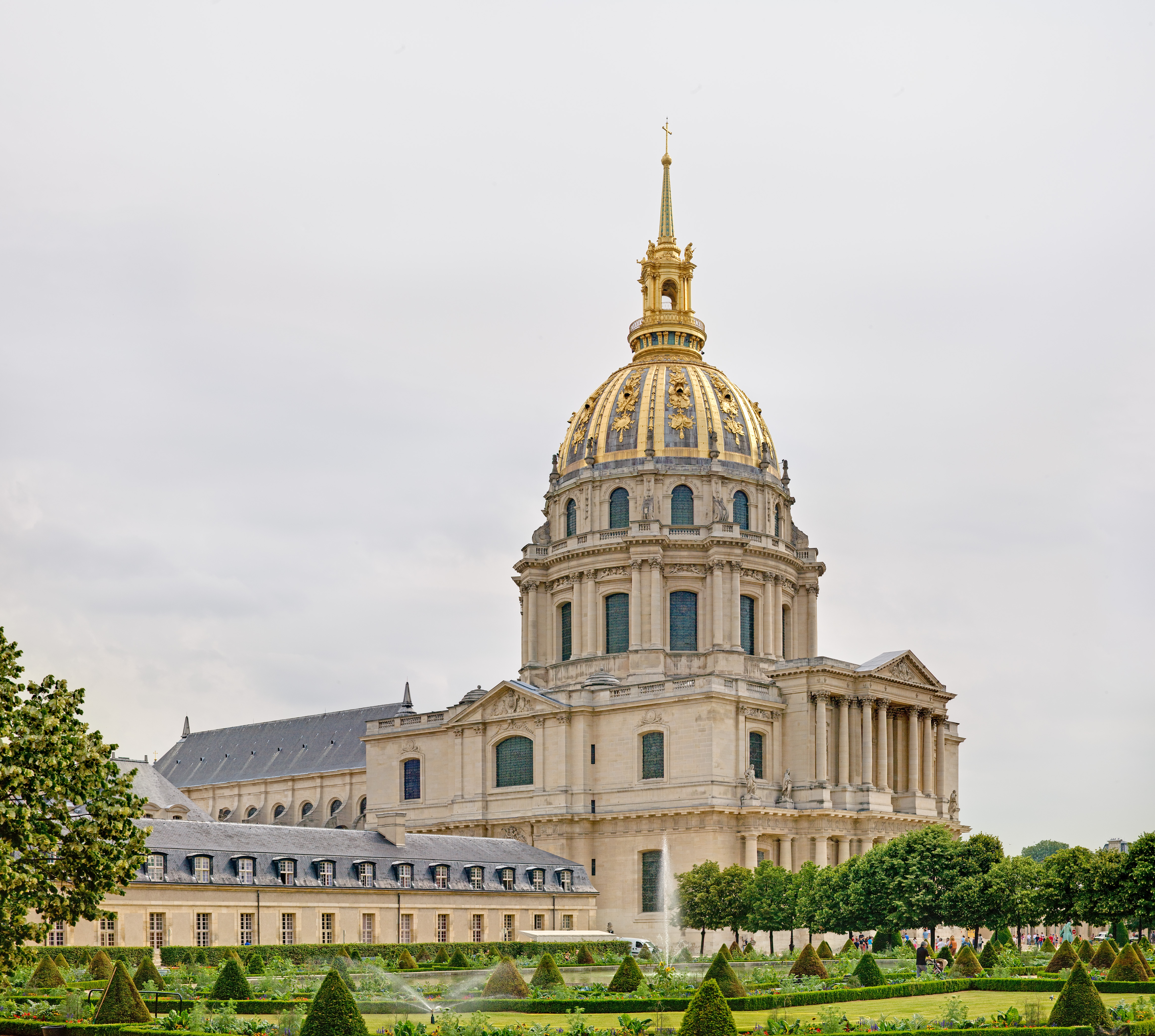
The cathedral is to the left, behind the dome church

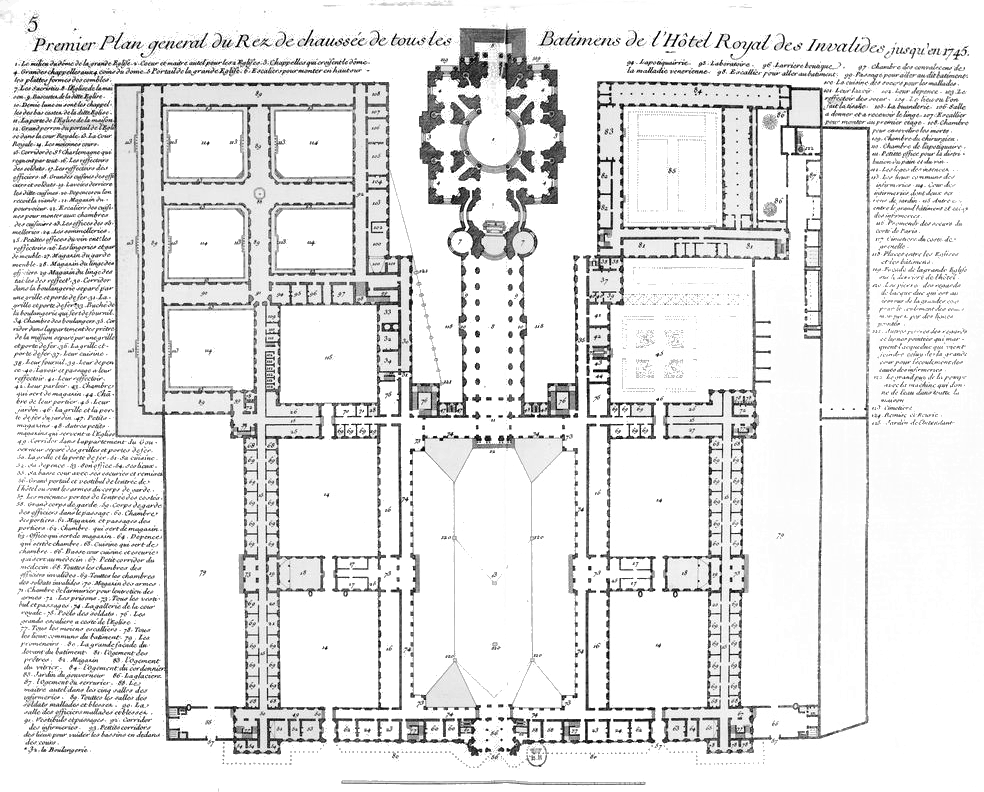
plan of the Les Invalides, with dome and church at top center

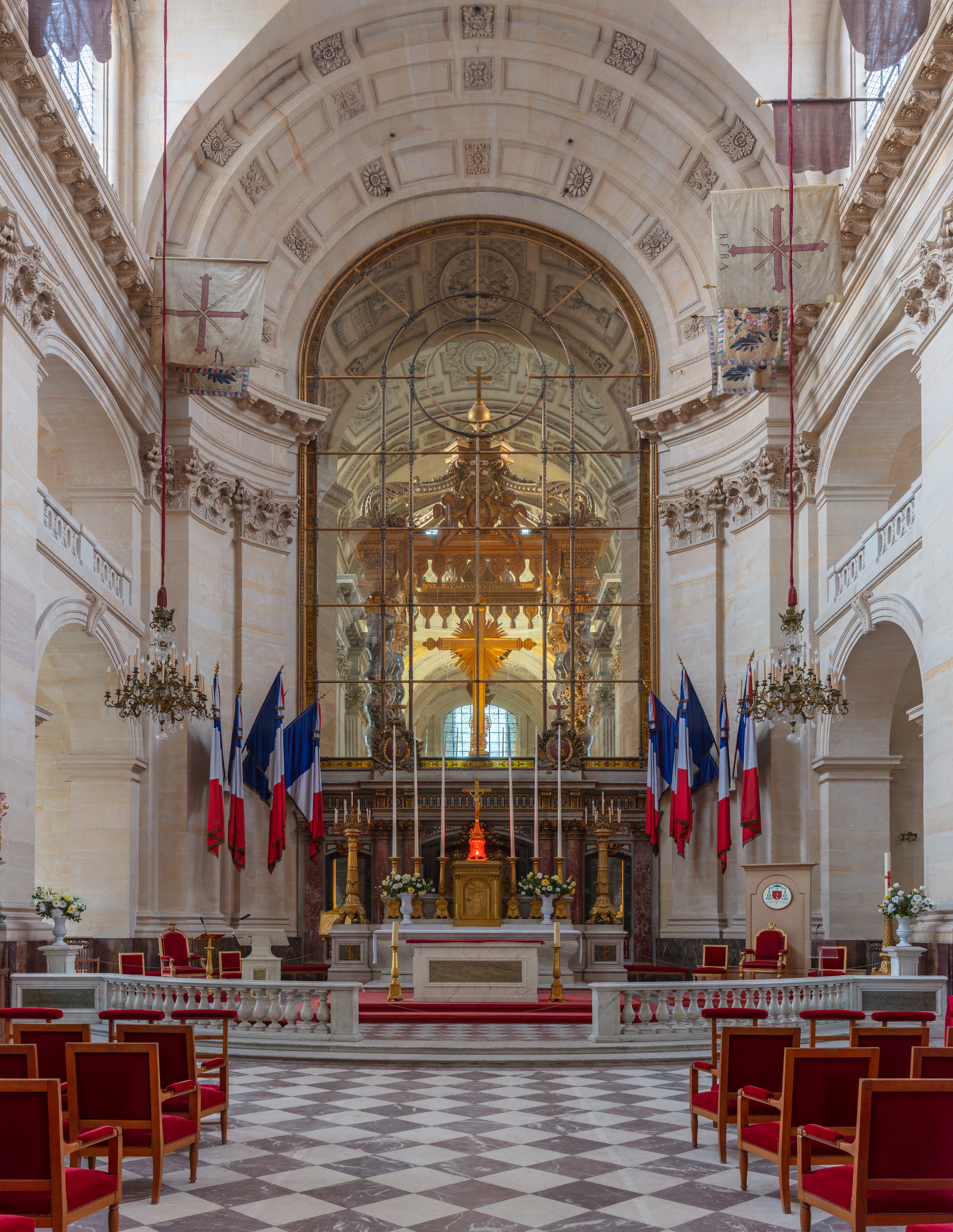
The window behind the altar looks into chapel of the dome

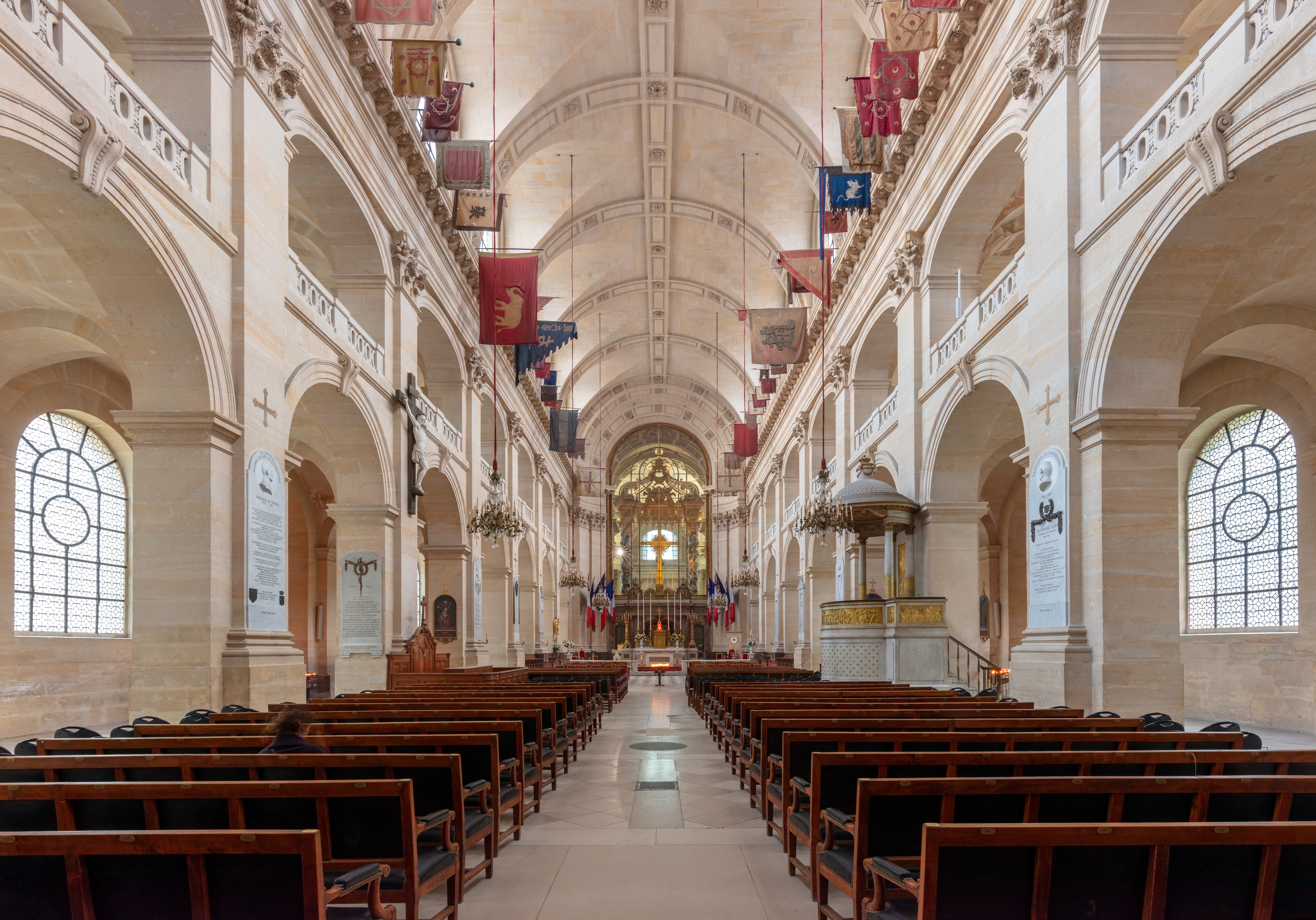
Nave of the cathedral, with captured flags

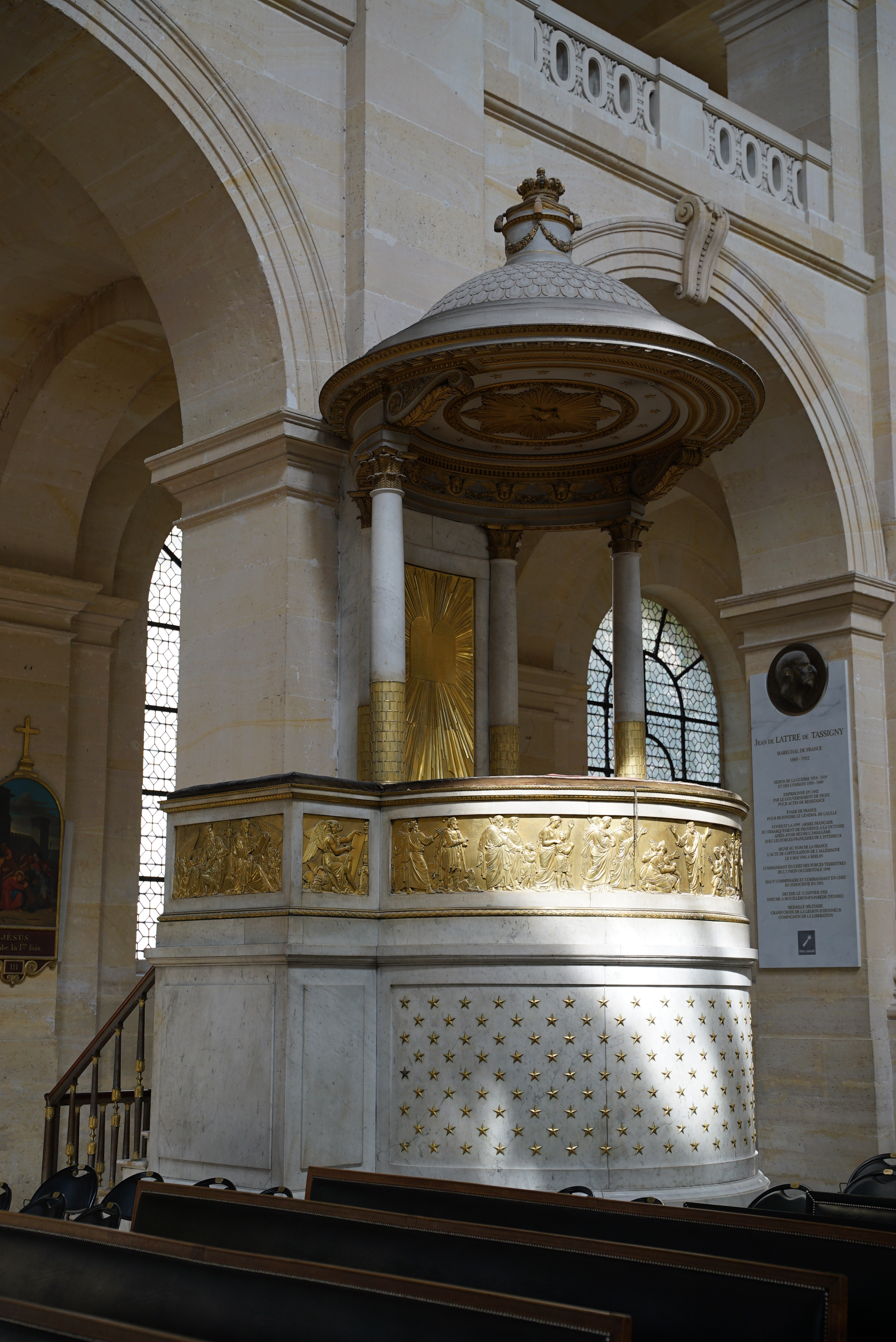
Pulpit of the cathedral

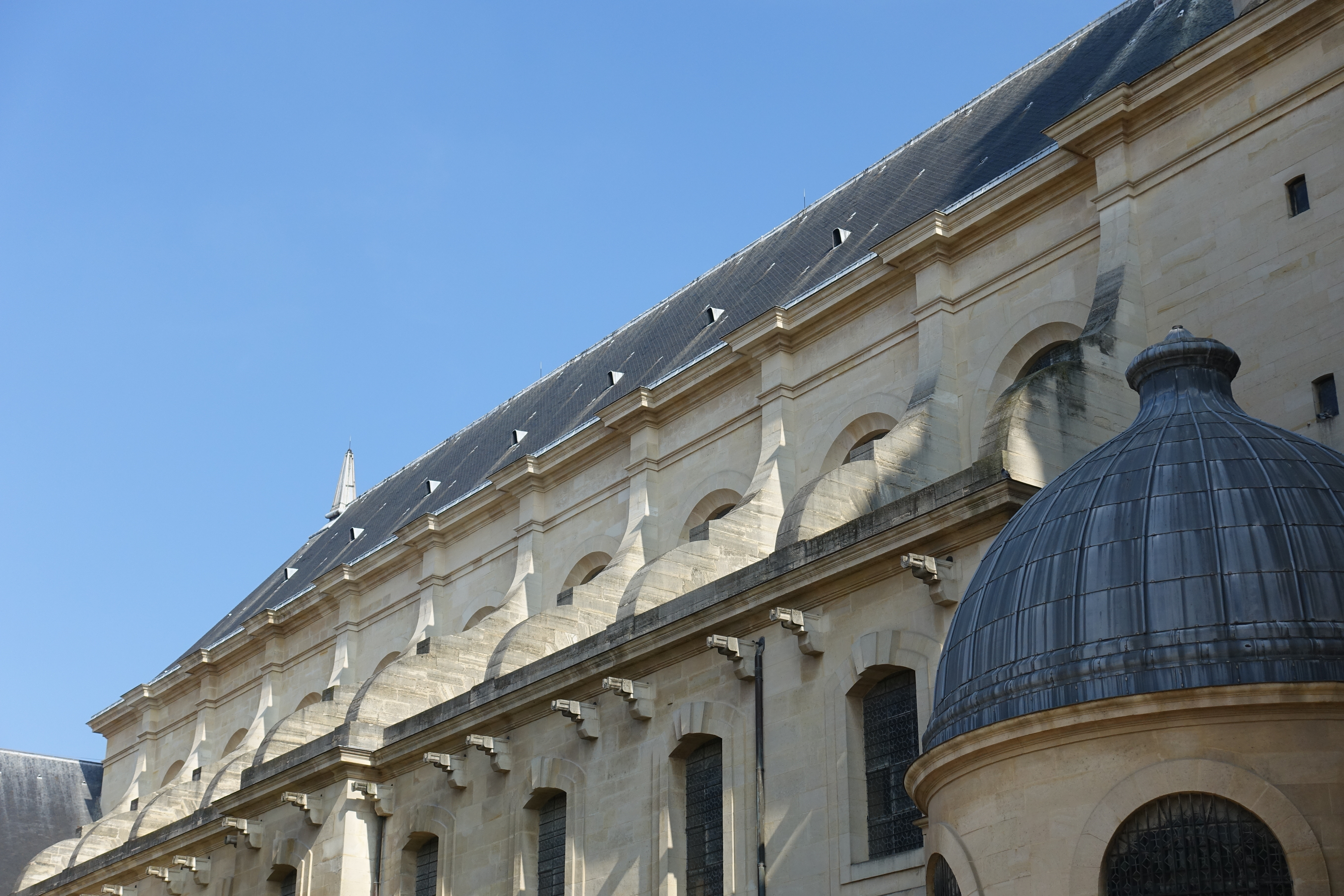
Exterior of cathedral

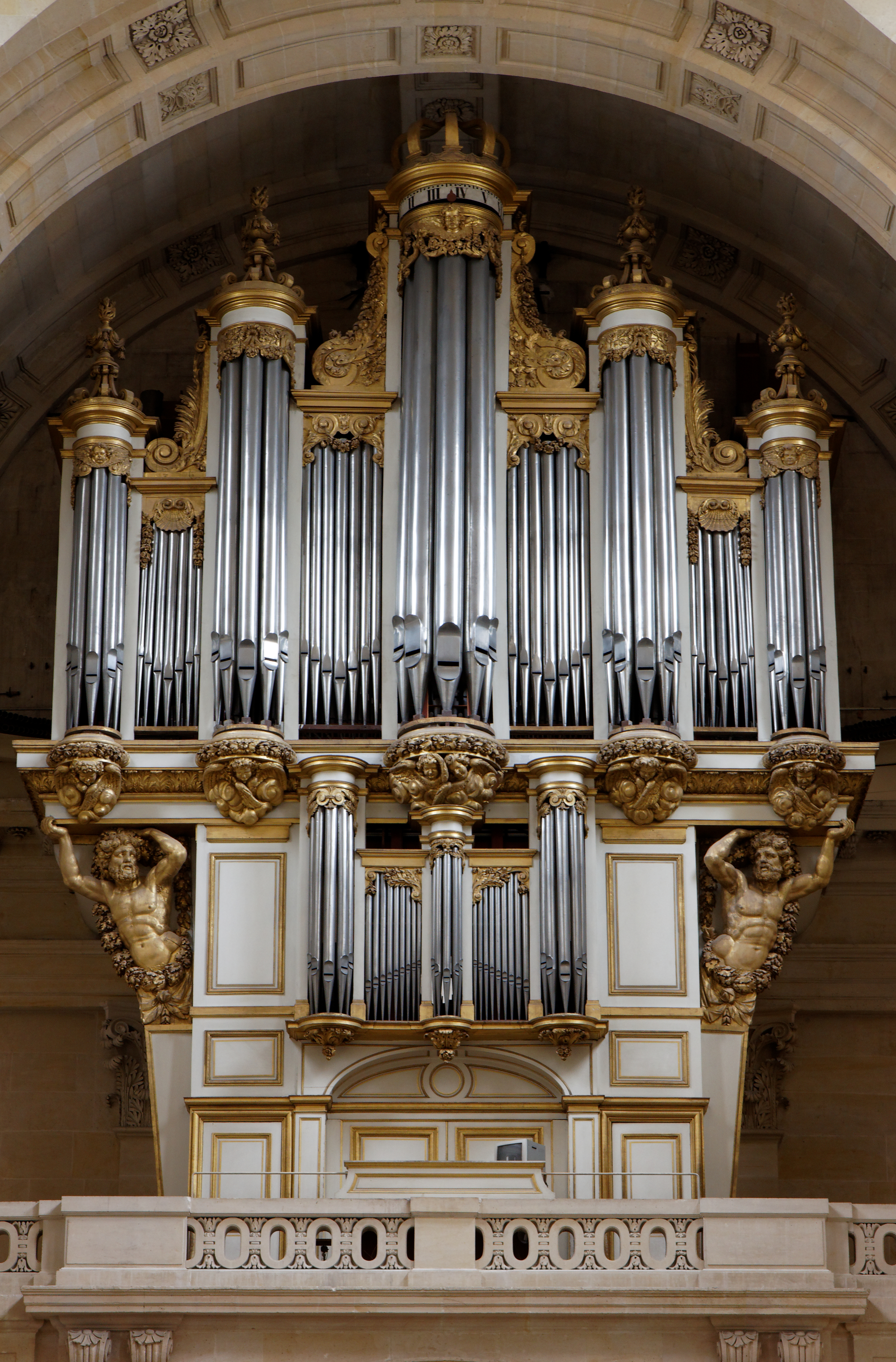
The cathedral organ, built 1679-1687

The church was built beginning in 1676 by Jules Hardouin-Mansart, following a concept of Liberal Bruant, the architect of the larger Invalides project. It was opened to soldiers beginning in 1679. The clock tower adjoining the church was intended to call the soldiers to their obligatory morning and evening prayer, and the obligatory attendance at mass and at vespers on Sunday and on important holidays.

In 1957, the position of vicar was created to oversee the spiritual care of the armed forces. In 1986 the position of the Bishop of the Armed Forces was established, the church being made the cathedral.
