= 7th arrondissement of Paris =

Municipal arrondissement in Paris

- Municipal arrondissement
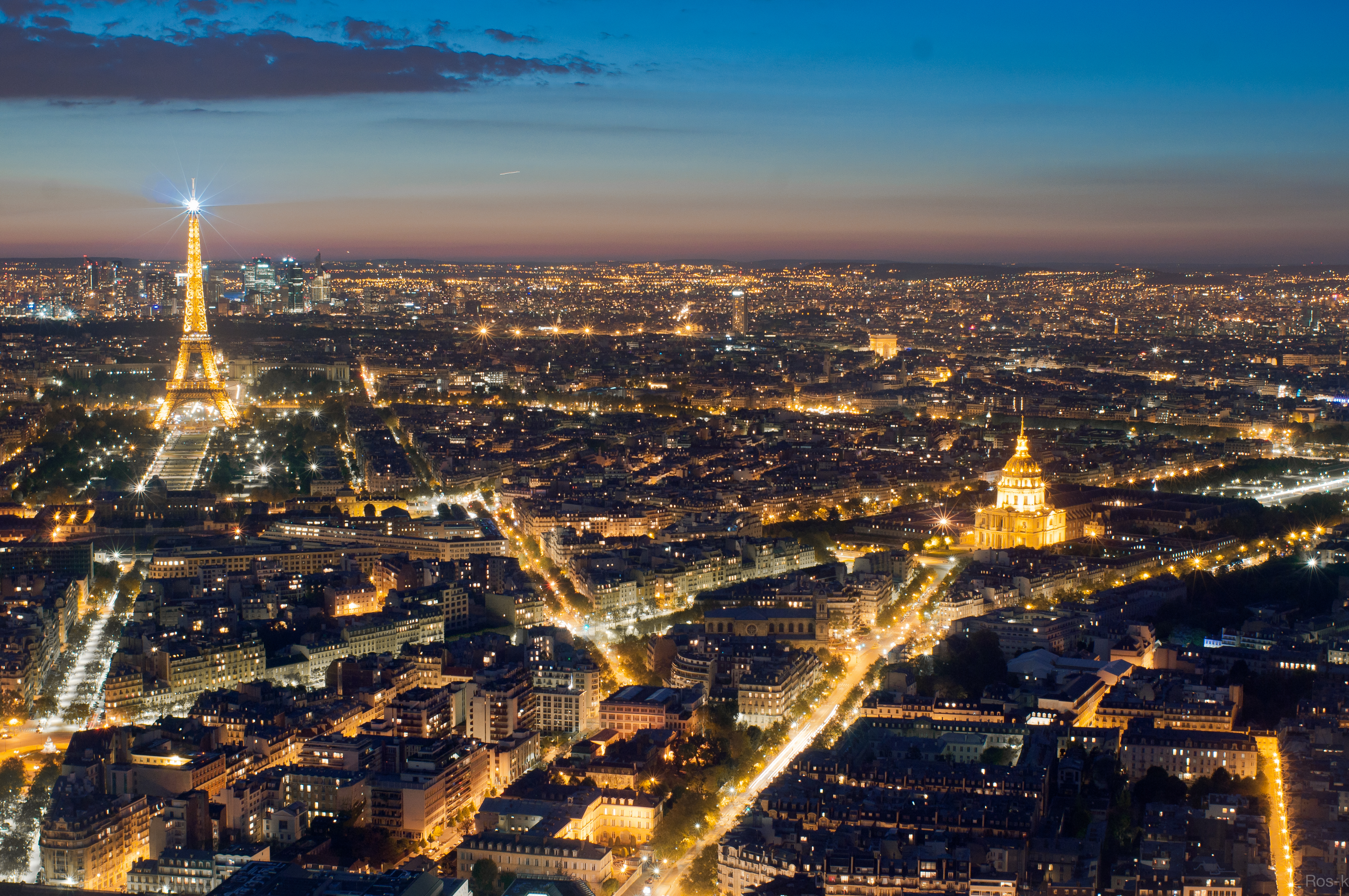
- View of the Eiffel Tower and Les Invalides, two landmarks of the 7th arrondissement

- Coat of arms

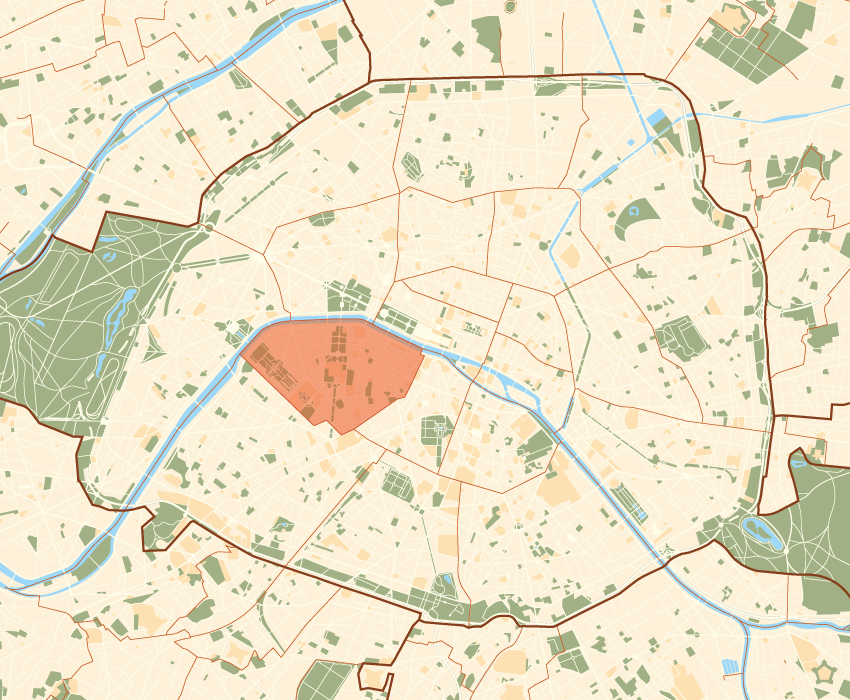
- Location within Paris
- Coordinates: 48°51′33″N 2°18′46″E
- Country: France
- Region: Île-de-France
- Department: Paris
- Commune: Paris

Government
  - Mayor (2020–2026): Rachida Dati (LR)
- Area: 4.09 km^{2} (1.58 sq mi)
- Population (2023): 48,015
  - Density: 11,700/km^{2} (30,400/sq mi)
- INSEE code: 75107

The 7th arrondissement of Paris (VII^{e} arrondissement) is one of the 20 arrondissements of the capital city of France. It is known for being, along with the 16th arrondissement and the suburban commune of Neuilly-sur-Seine, among the wealthiest places in France. In spoken French, the arrondissement is referred to as le septième ("the seventh"). In 2023, it had a population of 48,015.

The arrondissement, called Palais-Bourbon in a reference to the seat of the National Assembly, includes some of the major and well-known tourist attractions of Paris, such as the Eiffel Tower, the Hôtel des Invalides (Napoleon's resting place), the Chapel of Our Lady of the Miraculous Medal, as well as a concentration of museums such as the Musée d'Orsay, Musée Rodin and the Musée du Quai Branly – Jacques Chirac.

Situated on the Rive Gauche—the "Left" bank of the River Seine—this central arrondissement, which includes the historical aristocratic neighbourhood of Faubourg Saint-Germain, contains a number of French national institutions, among them the National Assembly and numerous government ministries. It is also home to many foreign diplomatic embassies, some of them occupying outstanding hôtels particuliers.

The arrondissement has been home to the French upper class since the 17th century, when it became the new residence of France's highest nobility. The district has been so fashionable within the French aristocracy that the phrase le Faubourg—referring to the ancient name of the current 7th arrondissement—has been used to describe French nobility ever since. The 7th arrondissement of Paris and Neuilly-sur-Seine form the most affluent and prestigious residential area in France.

== History ==
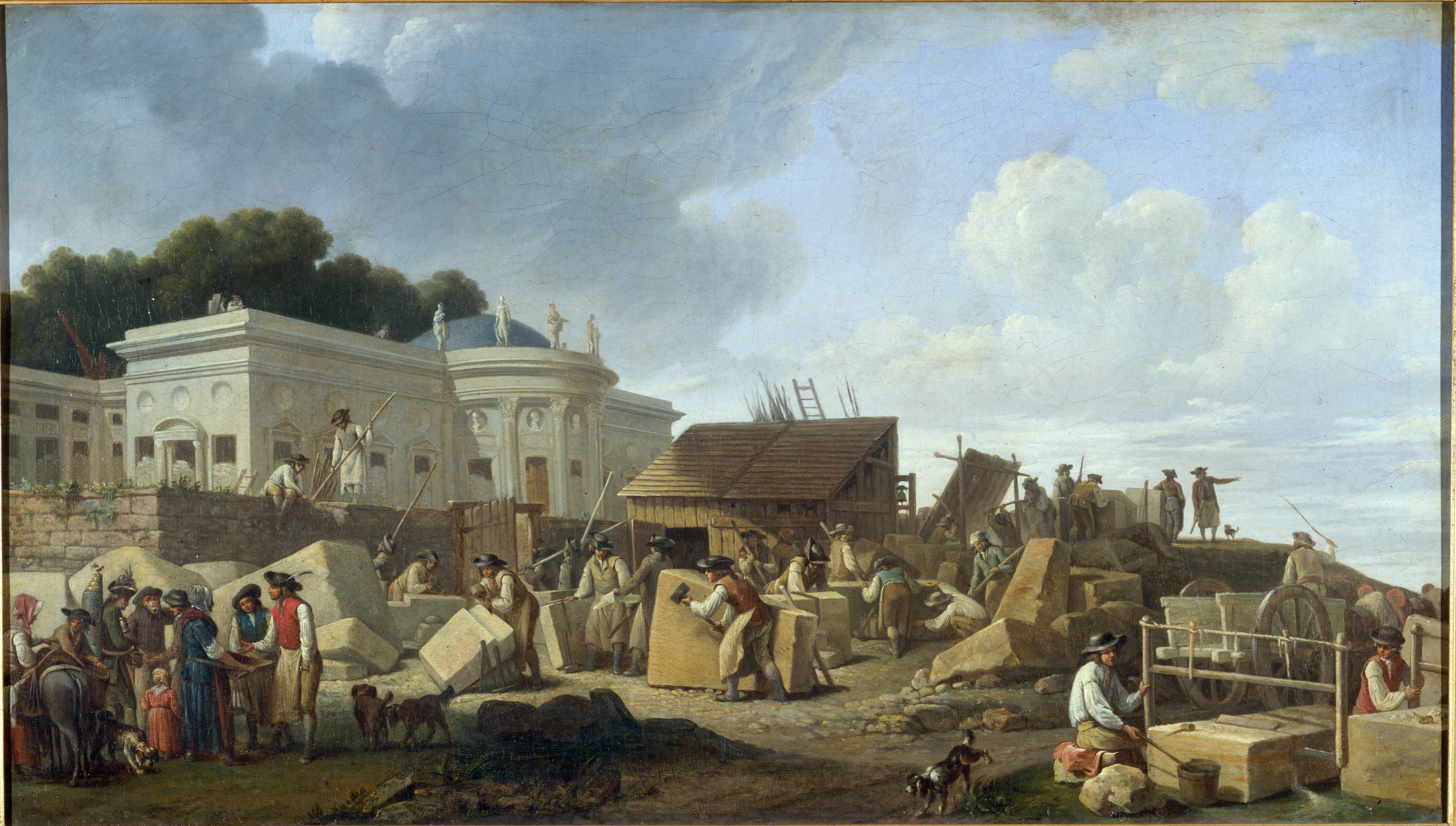
Construction of Hôtel de Salm, 1787. Paris, Musée Carnavalet.

Exposition Universelle in 1889, the entrance arch is known as the Eiffel Tower

During the 17th century, French high nobility started to move from the central Marais, the then-aristocratic district of Paris where nobles used to build their urban mansions (see Hotel de Soubise), to the clearer, less populated and less polluted Faubourg Saint-Germain.

The district became so fashionable within the French aristocracy that the phrase le Faubourg has been used to describe French nobility ever since. The oldest and most prestigious families of the French nobility built outstanding residences in the area, such as the Hôtel Matignon, the Hôtel de Salm, and the Hôtel Biron.

After the Revolution many of these mansions, offering magnificent inner spaces, many reception rooms and exquisite decoration, were confiscated and turned into national institutions. The French expression "les ors de la Republique" (literally "the golds of the Republic"), refers to the luxurious environment of the national palaces (outstanding official residences and priceless works of art), comes from that time.

During the Restauration, the Faubourg recovered its past glory as the most exclusive high nobility district of Paris and was the political heart of the country, home to the Ultra Party. After the Fall of Charles X, the district lost most of its political influence but remained the centre of the French upper class' social life.

During the 19th century, the arrondissement hosted no fewer than five Universal Exhibitions (1855, 1867, 1878, 1889, 1900) that have immensely impacted its cityscape. The Eiffel Tower and the Orsay building were built for these Exhibitions (respectively in 1889 and 1900).

== Geography ==
The arrondissement has a total land area of 4.088 km^{2} (1.578 sq mi; 1,010 acres). It has an average elevation of 47 m, with a minimum of 25 m and a maximum of 71 m. The 7th arrondissement borders the left bank of the Seine to the north, Rue des Saints-Pères to the east, and Rue de Sèvres to the south-east.

== Demography ==
The 7th arrondissement attained its peak population in 1926 when it had 110,684 inhabitants. Because it is the location of so many French government bodies, this arrondissement has never been as densely populated as some of the others. In 1999, the arrondissement provided 76,212 jobs.

=== Historical population ===
Historical population

| Year | Pop. | ±% p.a. |
|---|---|---|
| 1861 | 72,965 | — |
| 1872 | 78,553 | +0.67% |
| 1881 | 85,406 | +0.93% |
| 1891 | 97,950 | +1.38% |
| 1901 | 102,497 | +0.45% |
| 1911 | 106,279 | +0.36% |
| 1921 | 110,345 | +0.38% |
| 1931 | 107,567 | −0.25% |
| 1936 | 104,154 | −0.64% |
| 1946 | 102,559 | −0.15% |
| 1954 | 104,412 | +0.22% |

| Year | Pop. | ±% p.a. |
|---|---|---|
| 1962 | 99,584 | −0.59% |
| 1968 | 87,811 | −2.08% |
| 1975 | 74,250 | −2.37% |
| 1982 | 67,461 | −1.36% |
| 1990 | 62,939 | −0.86% |
| 1999 | 56,985 | −1.10% |
| 2007 | 57,410 | +0.09% |
| 2012 | 57,092 | −0.11% |
| 2017 | 51,367 | −2.09% |
| 2023 | 48,015 | −1.12% |

Source: Demographia (1861-1999) and INSEE (1876-2023)

=== Immigration ===
Place of birth of residents of the 7th arrondissement in 1999
| Born in metropolitan France | Born outside metropolitan France | | | |
|---|---|---|---|---|
| 78.3% | 21.7% | | | |
| 78.3% | Born in overseas France | Born in foreign countries with French citizenship at birth^{1} | EU-15 immigrants^{2} | Non-EU-15 immigrants |
| 78.3% | 0.5% | 4.9% | 7.4% | 8.9% |
^{1} This group is made up largely of former French settlers, such as pieds-noirs in Northwest Africa, followed by former colonial citizens who had French citizenship at birth (such as was often the case for the native elite in French colonies), as well as to a lesser extent foreign-born children of French expatriates. A foreign country is understood as a country not part of France in 1999, so a person born for example in 1950 in Algeria, when Algeria was an integral part of France, is nonetheless listed as a person born in a foreign country in French statistics.^{2} An immigrant is a person born in a foreign country not having French citizenship at birth. An immigrant may have acquired French citizenship since moving to France, but is still considered an immigrant in French statistics. On the other hand, persons born in France with foreign citizenship (the children of immigrants) are not listed as immigrants.

=== Notable residents ===
- Simone Veil (1927–2017)
- Pierre Victor, Baron de Besenval de Brunstatt

== Cityscape ==
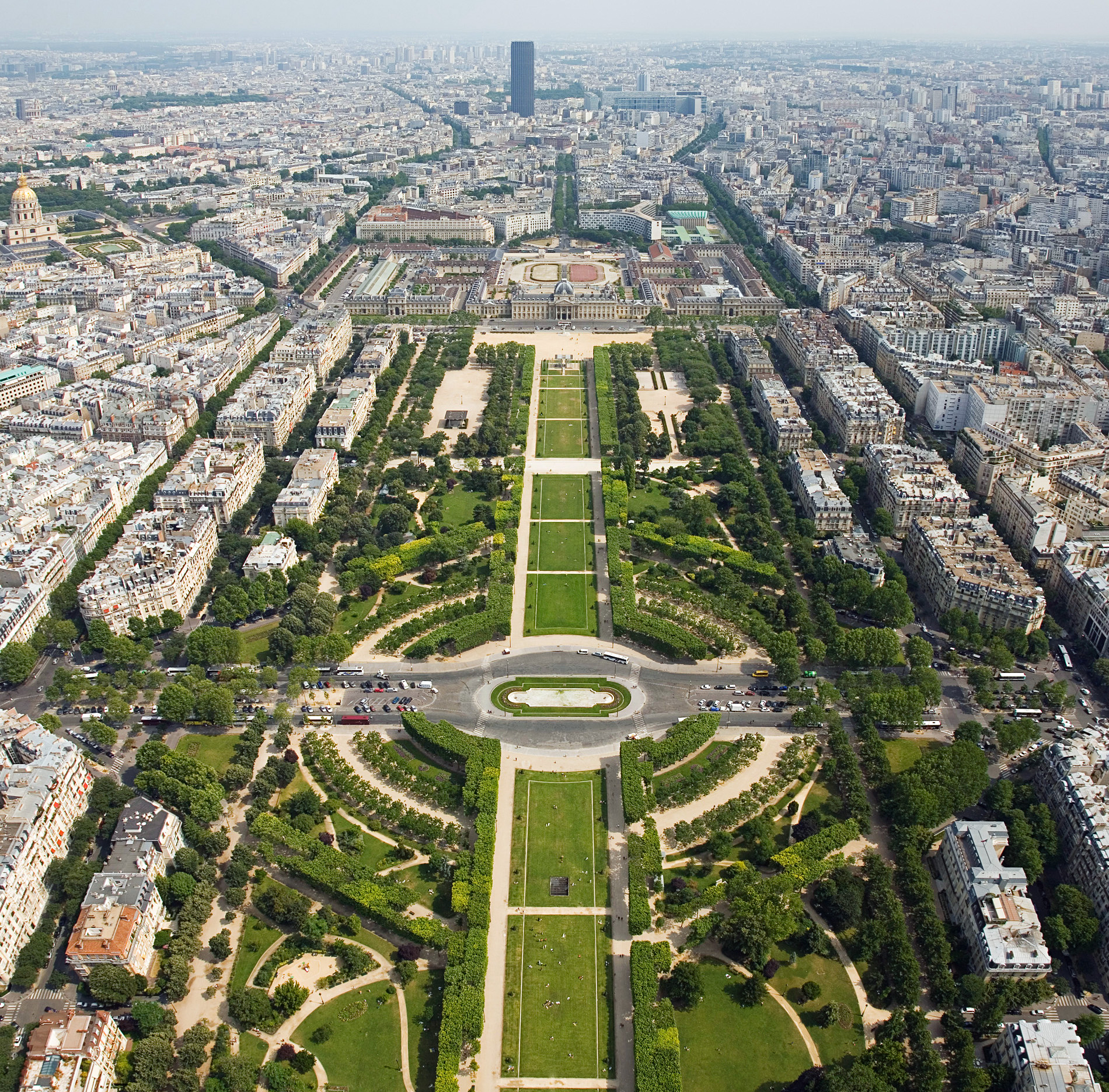
Champ-de-Mars view from the top of the Eiffel Tower

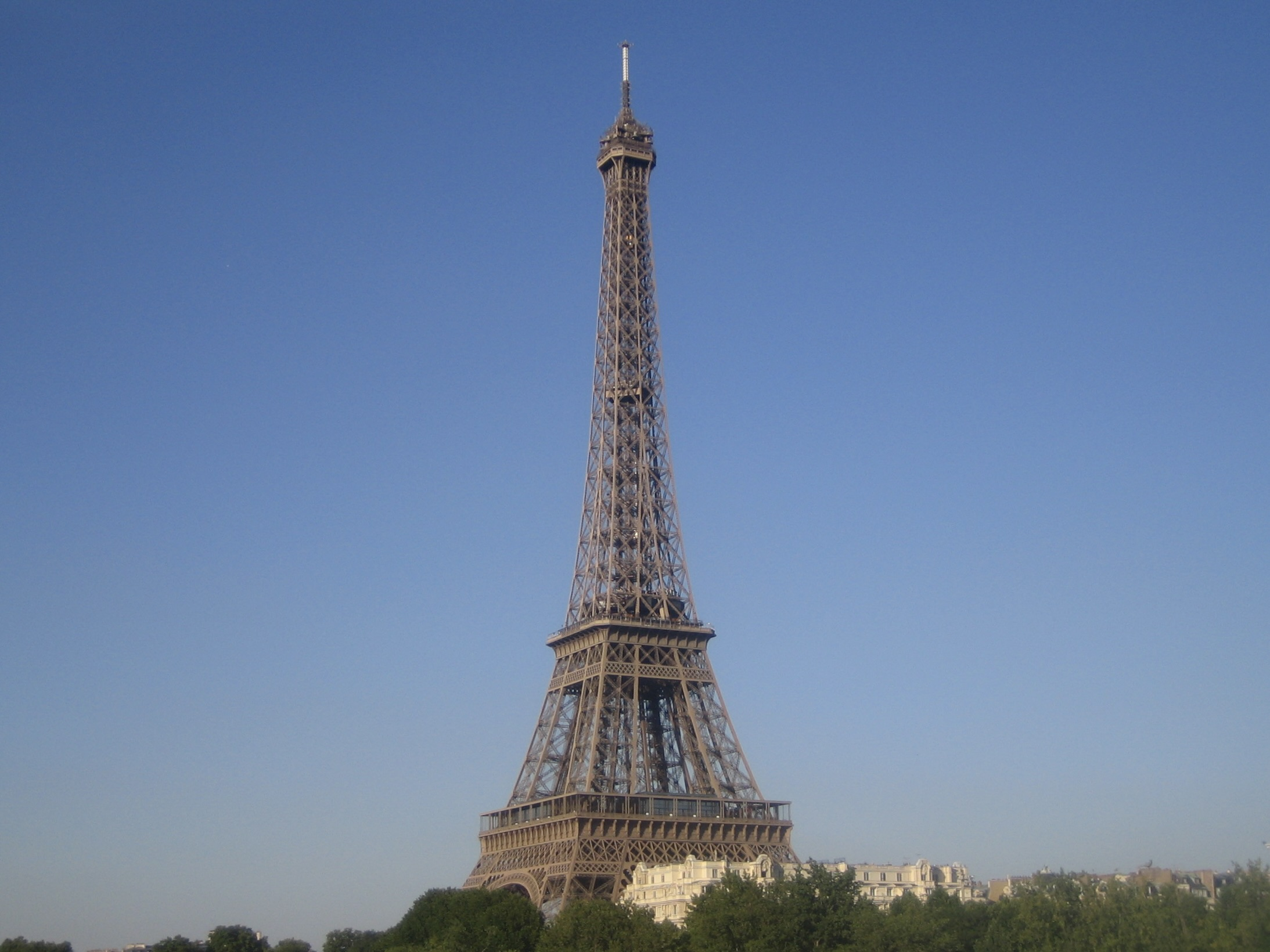
The Eiffel Tower

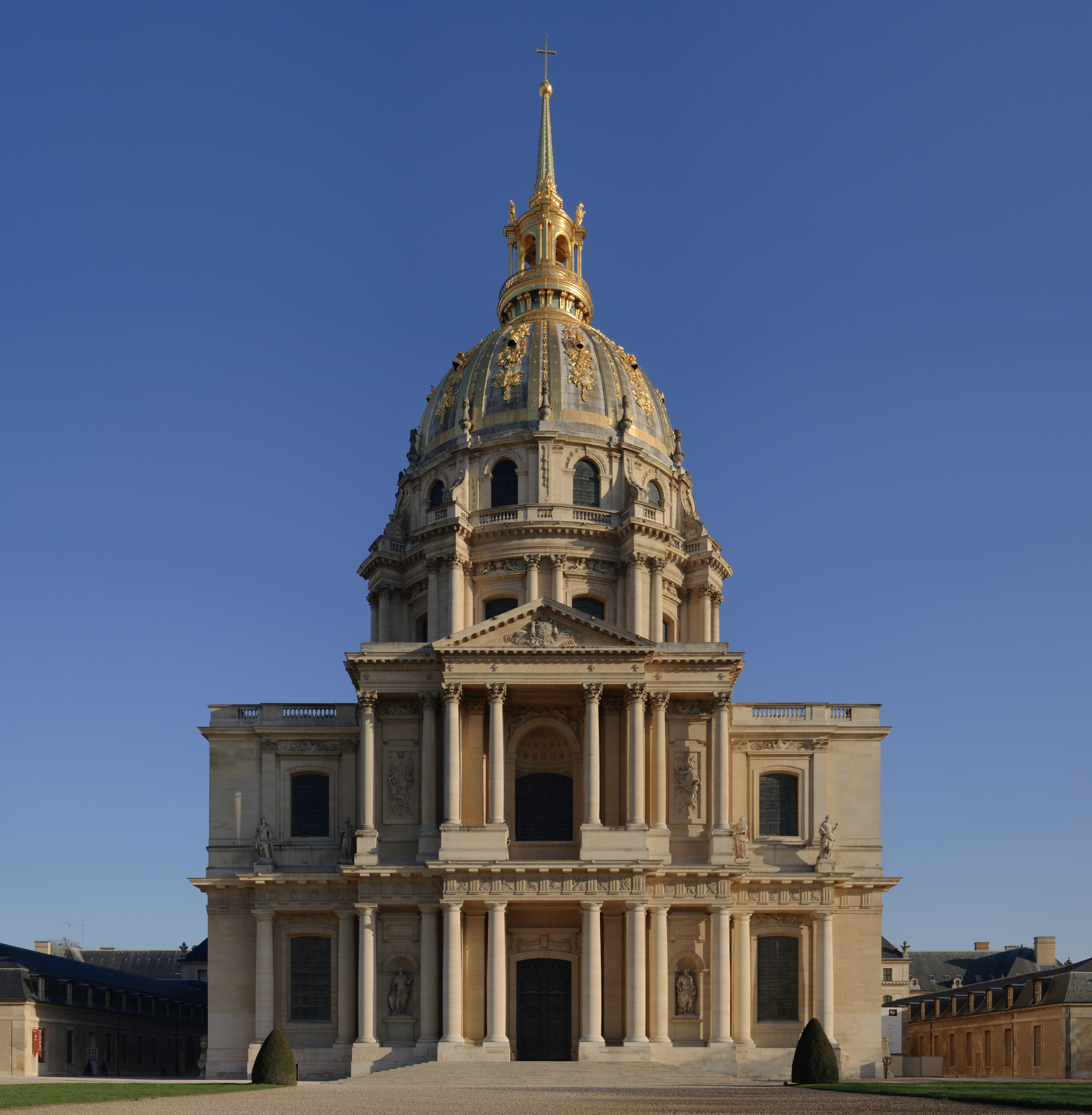
St. Louis Chapel of the Hôtel des Invalides view from avenue de Breteuil

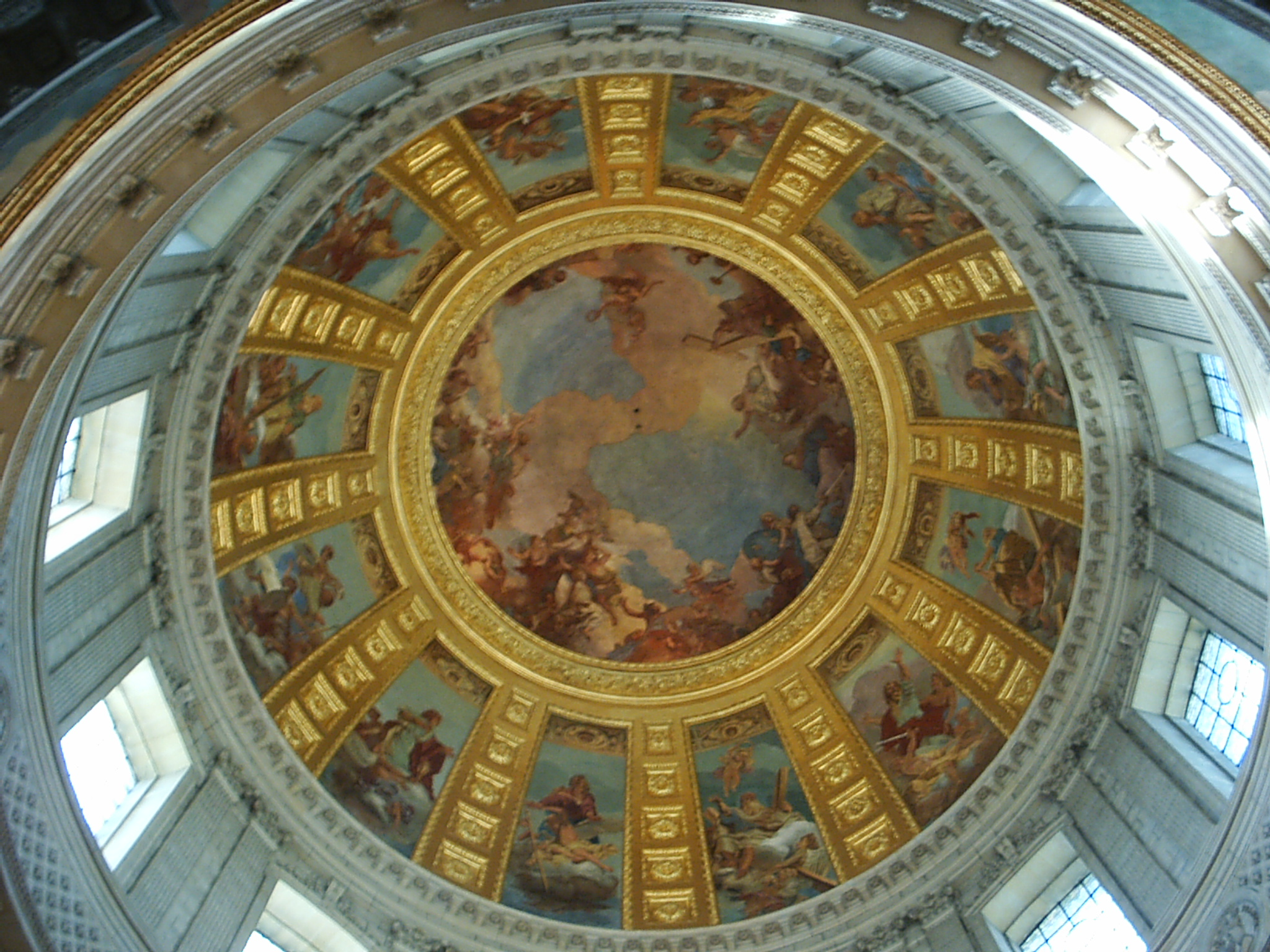
Inside Hôtel des Invalides's Chapel

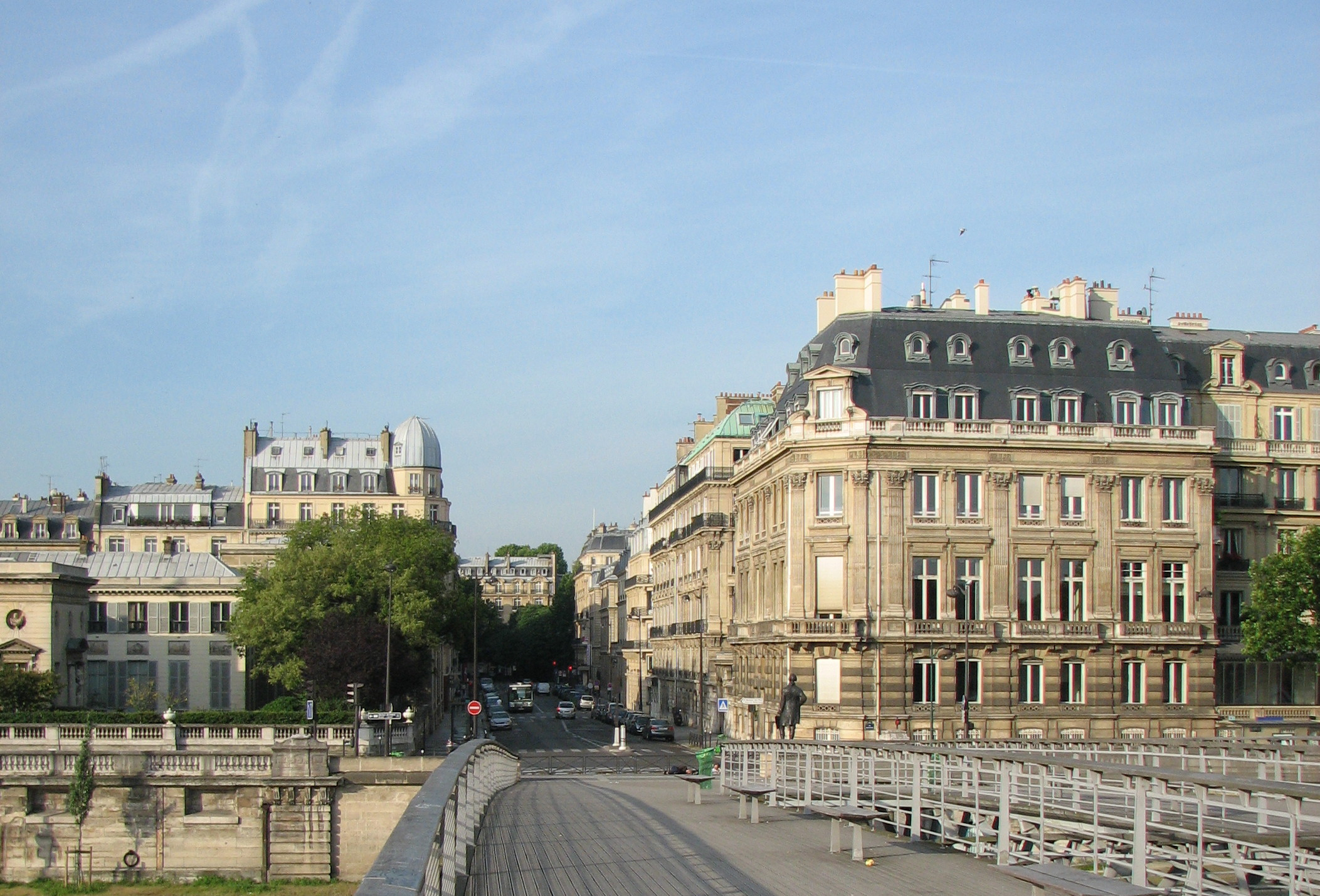
View of rue de Solférino from the Léopold-Sédar-Senghor bridge

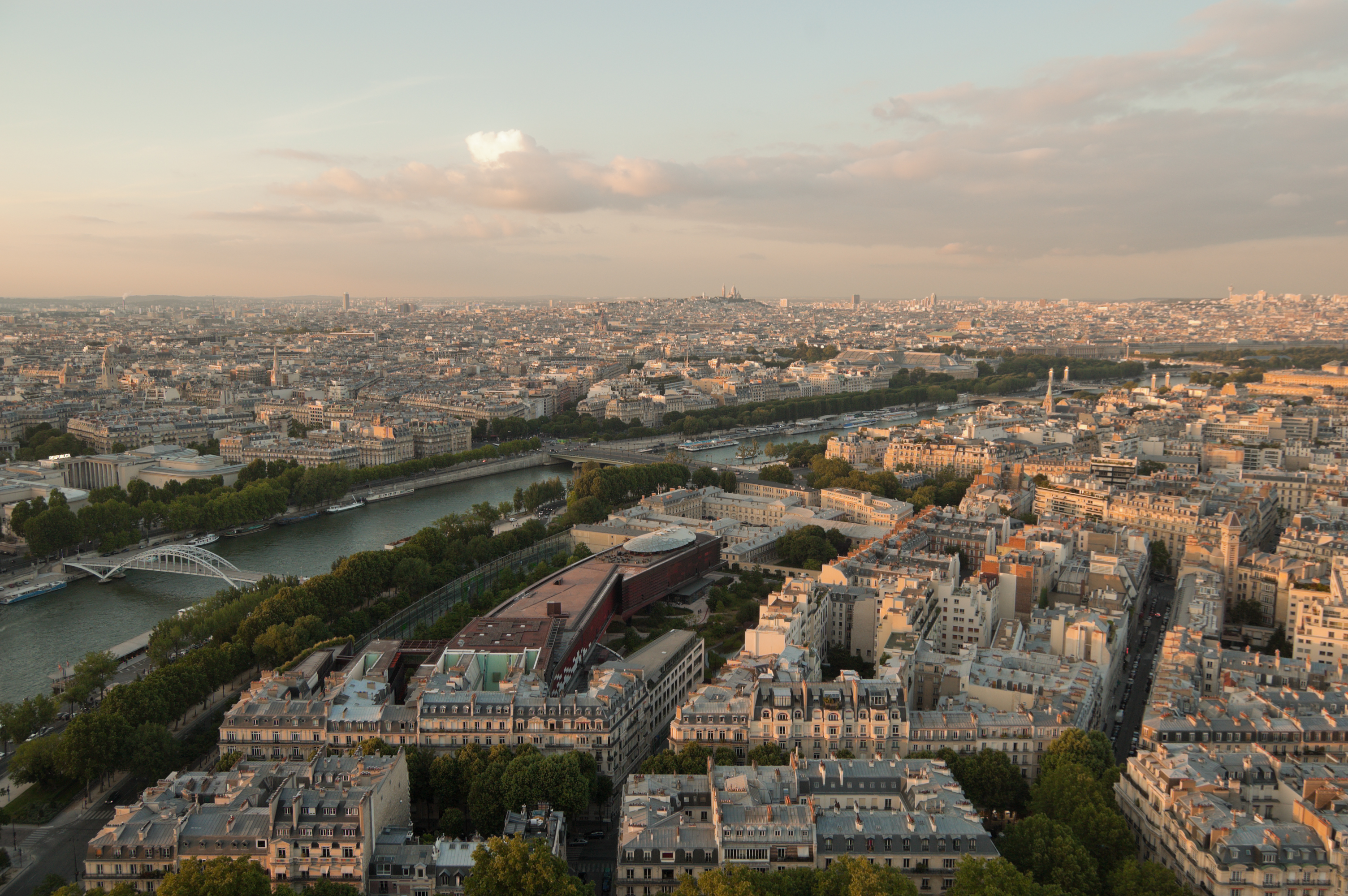
The Seine and the 7th arrondissement as seen from the Eiffel Tower

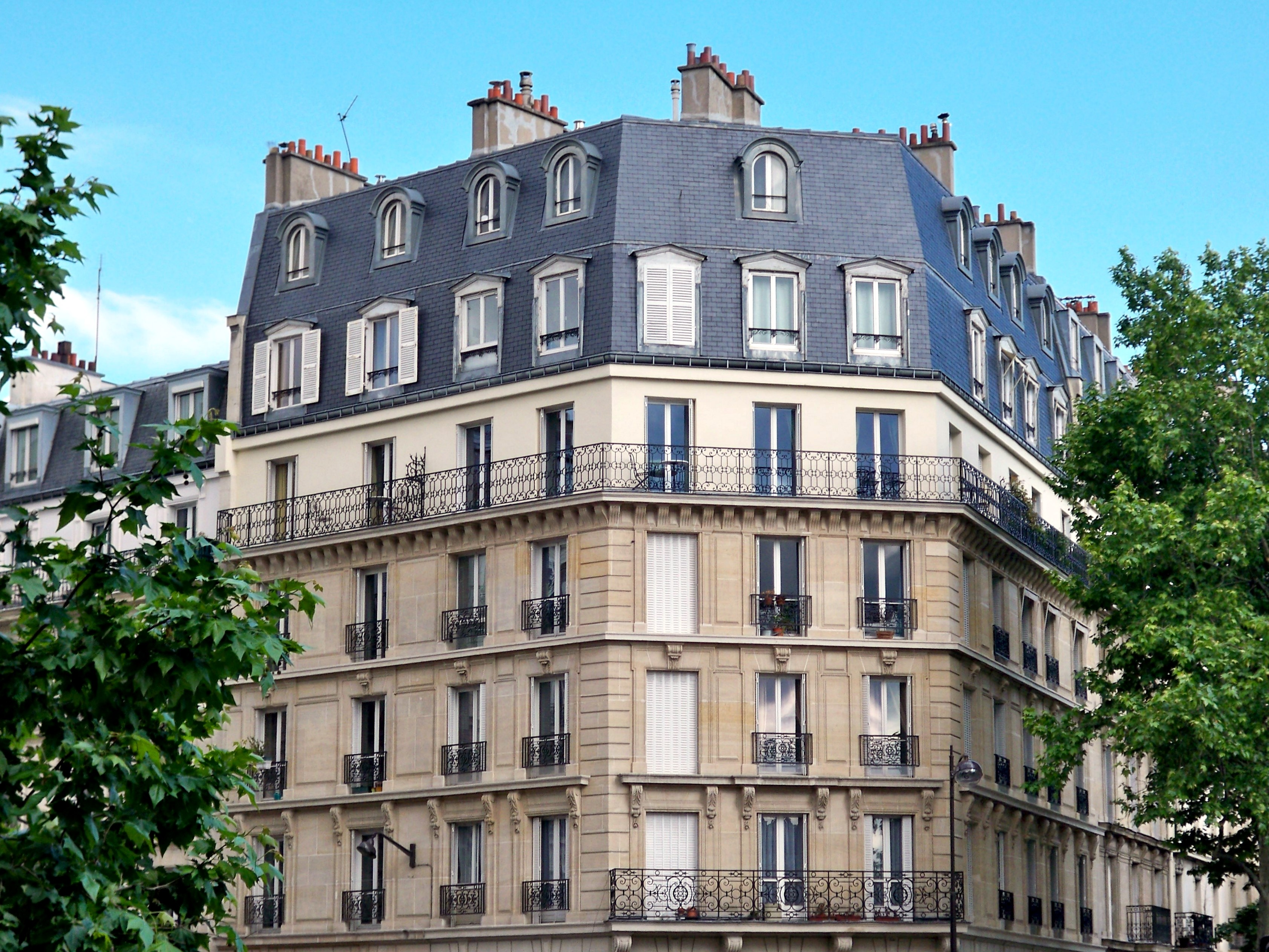
Typical Parisian architecture in the 7th arrondissement

== Quarters ==
The quarters of the 7th arrondissement

- Quartier Saint-Thomas-d'Aquin (25)
- Quartier Invalides (26)
- Quartier École-Militaire (27)
- Quartier Gros-Caillou (28)

== Places of interest ==
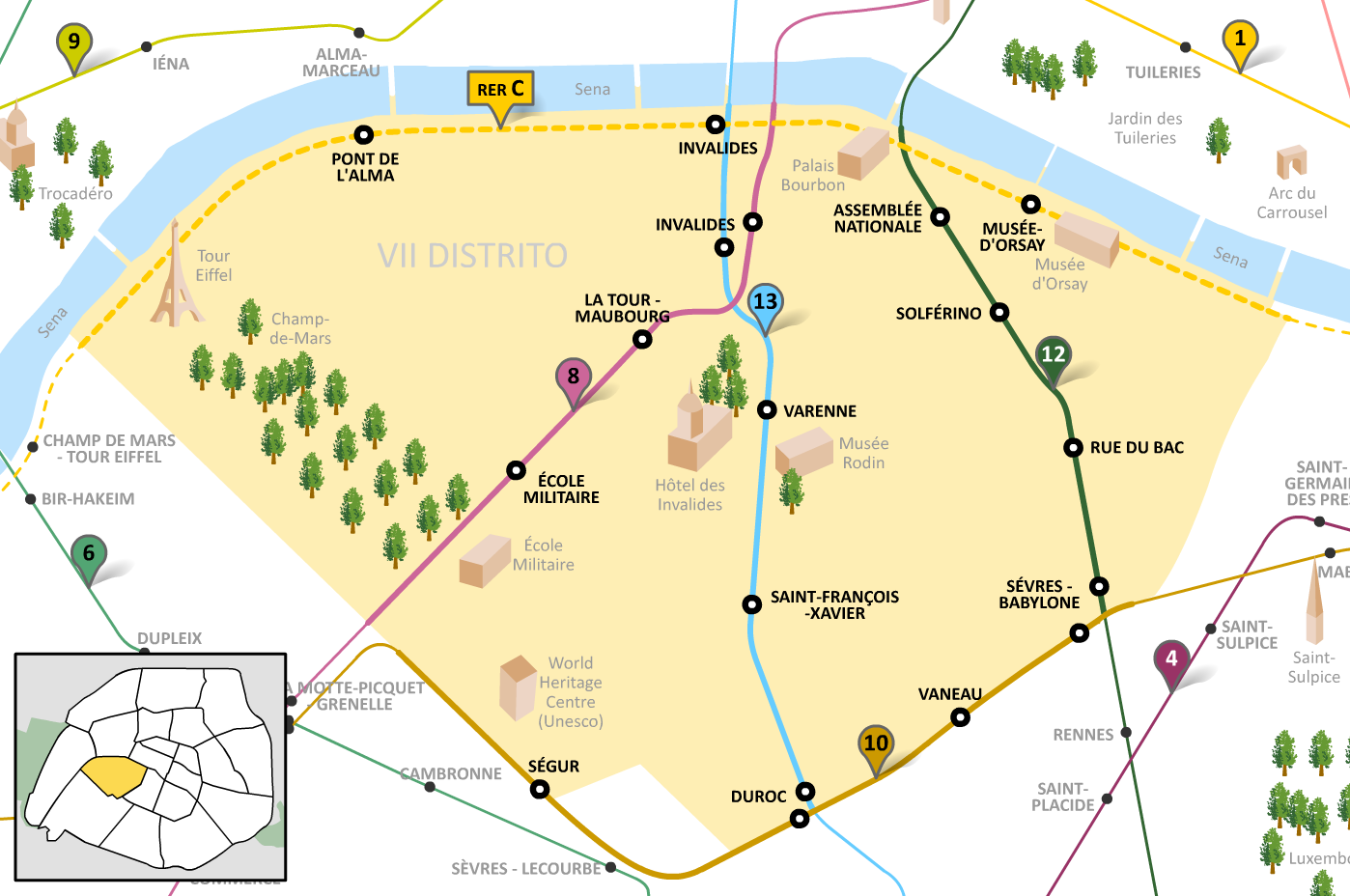

Important places include:

- Palais Bourbon, meeting place of the National Assembly
- Eiffel Tower
- Cathedral of Saint-Louis-des-Invalides, Paris
- Hôtel Matignon
- Hôtel de Boisgelin (Rue de Varenne), historic building, home to the Italian embassy in Paris.
- Hôtel de Besenval
- Champ de Mars
- Musée d'Orsay
- École Militaire
- Hôtel des Invalides
- Maison Gainsbourg
- Maison de Verre
- Musée du quai Branly
- Musée national de la Légion d'Honneur et des Ordres de Chevalerie
- Musée Maillol
- Musée de l'Ordre de la Libération
- Musée Rodin
- Musée Valentin Haüy
- Institut d'Études Politiques de Paris (Sciences Po)
- Cathedral of Saint-Louis-des-Invalides, Paris
- Saint-Pierre-du-Gros-Caillou

== Art and industry ==
- Musée du quai Branly
- Musée national de la Légion d'Honneur et des Ordres de Chevalerie
- Musée Maillol
- Musée de l'Ordre de la Libération
- Musée Rodin
- Musée Valentin Haüy
- National Horticultural Society of France

== Economy ==
Air Liquide, Alcatel-Lucent, and Valode & Pistre have their head offices in this arrondissement.

== Education ==
Public and private high schools:

- Lycée Victor-Duruy
- Établissement La Rochefoucauld
- Institut de l'Alma
- Lycée-collège Paul-Claudel
- Lycée d'Hulst
- Lycée Sainte-Jeanne Elisabeth
- Lycée Saint-Thomas-d'Aquin
- Lycée Thérèse-Chappuis

Istituto Statale Italiano Leonardo Da Vinci, an Italian international school, maintains two campuses in the arrondissement. The American University of Paris, a private liberal arts university, maintains several buildings near the Quai d'Orsay.

== Government ==
The Ministry of Agriculture, the Ministry of Foreign Affairs and the Ministry of National Education have their head offices in the arrondissement.

Politically, the arrondissement is situated firmly on the right. The mayor of the 7th, Rachida Dati, was Minister of Justice under Nicolas Sarkozy's presidency and a member of the European Parliament for the centre-right UMP from 2009 to 2019.

In the 2017 French presidential election, the 7th gave right-wing candidate François Fillon 52.7% of its votes in the first round, compared to his poor national showing of only 20%. It then went on to vote for Emmanuel Macron in the runoff by a landslide.

| Election | Winning candidate | Party | % |
|---|---|---|---|
| 2017 | Emmanuel Macron | EM | 88.07 |
| 2012 | Nicolas Sarkozy | UMP | 71.76 |
| 2007 | Nicolas Sarkozy | UMP | 74.75 |
| 2002 | Jacques Chirac | RPR | 89.17 |
| 1981 | Valéry Giscard d'Estaing | UDF | 71.44 |

== Sport ==
The arrondissement hosted the equestrian events for the 1900 Summer Olympics.
